= Economy of Japan =

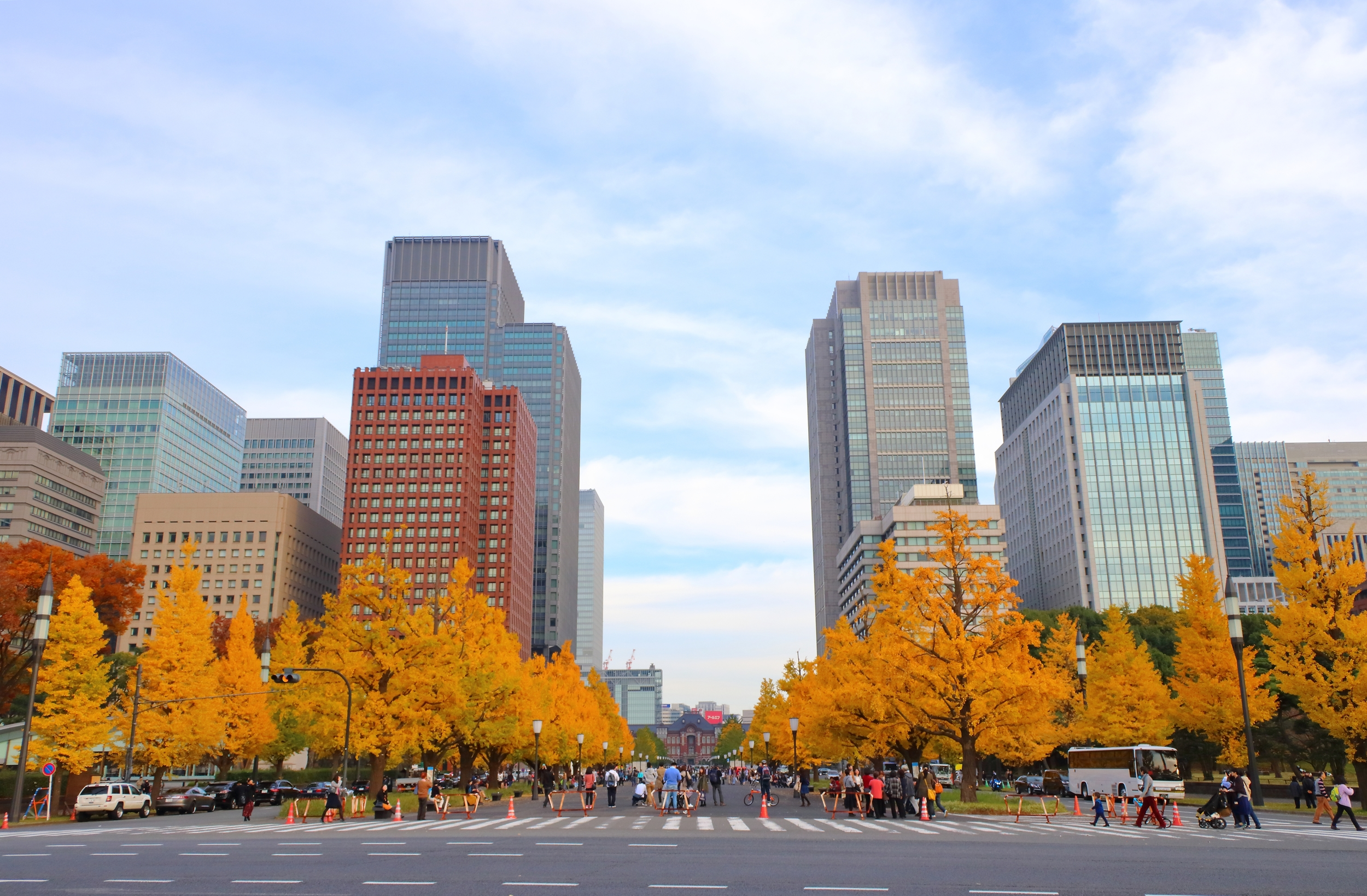
- Marunouchi in Tokyo, the financial centre of Japan
- Currency: Japanese yen (JPY, ¥)
- Fiscal year: 1 April – 31 March
- Trade organisations: APEC, WTO, CPTPP, RCEP, OECD, G-20, G7 and others
- Country group: Advanced economy; High-income economy; Welfare state

Statistics
- Population: ▼123,262,483 (2025)
- GDP: ▼$4.341 trillion (nominal; 2026f); ▲$7.262 trillion (PPP; 2026f)
- GDP rank: 4th (nominal; 2026); 5th (PPP; 2026)
- GDP growth: 0.6% (2026f)
- GDP per capita: ▼$35,399 (nominal; 2026f); ▲$59,207 (PPP; 2026f)
- GDP per capita rank: 40th (nominal; 2026); 39th (PPP; 2026)
- GDP per capita growth: 1.7% (real; 2025)
- GDP by sector: Agriculture: 1.0%; Industry: 26.9%; Services: 71.4%; (2022 est.)
- GDP by component: Household consumption: 55.6%; Government consumption: 21.6%; Investment in fixed capital: 26.0%; Investment in inventories: 0.6%; Exports of goods and services: 21.5%; Imports of goods and services: −25.3%; (2022 est.)
- Inflation (CPI): ▲2.8% (2026)
- Gini coefficient: 33.8 medium (2021)
- Human Development Index: ▲0.925 very high (2023) (23rd); ▲0.845 very high IHDI (20th) (2023)
- Corruption Perceptions Index: 71 out of 100 points (2025) (rank 18th)
- Labour force: ▼69.349 million (2023 est.); ▲61.2% employment rate (May 2023)
- Labour force by occupation: Agriculture: 3%; Industry: 24%; Services: 73%; (2023)
- Unemployment: ▼2.3% (July 2025); ▼3.7% youth unemployment (15 to 24 year-olds; May 2023); ▼1.69 million unemployed (July 2025)
- Average gross salary: ¥452,247 / US$3,106 monthly (2024)
- Average net salary: ¥352,541 / US$2,421 monthly (2024)
- Main industries: High technology; Motor vehicles; Electronics; Machine tools; Steel; Nonferrous metals; Ships; Chemicals; Textiles; Processed foods

External
- Exports: ▲$738 billion (2025)
- Export goods: Transport equipment 21.0%; Machinery 19.9%; Electrical machinery 18.7%; Chemicals 12.4%; Manufactured goods 10.4%; Raw materials 1.7%; Foodstuff 1.3%; Mineral fuels 0.8%; Others: 13.8%
- Main export partners: China 22.8%; Hong Kong 5.8%; United States 18.5%; ASEAN 14.5%; European Union 9.1%; Taiwan 7.2%; South Korea 6.3%; (2025)
- Imports: ▲$755.7 billion USD (2025)
- Import goods: Electrical machinery 17.6%; Mineral fuels 16.6%; Machinery 10.5%; Foodstuff 9.9%; Chemicals 9.9%; Manufactured goods 9.3%; Raw materials 6.9%; Transport equipment 5.0%; Others: 14.4%
- Main import partners: China 23.8%; Hong Kong 0.2%; ASEAN 15.8%; United States 11.4%; European Union 11.3%; Australia 6.0%; Taiwan 4.4%; (2025)
- FDI stock: ▼ Inward: $25 billion (2021); ▲ Outward: $147 billion (2021)
- Current account: ▲$166.937 billion (2025)
- Gross external debt: ▲$4.54 trillion (March 2023) (103.2% of GDP)

Public finance
- Government debt: ▲¥1.451 quadrillion; ▲229.6% of GDP (2025)
- Foreign reserves: ▼US$1.255 trillion (September 2024)
- Budget balance: -1.37% of GDP (2025 est.)
- Revenue: ¥236,284 billion 37.2% of GDP (2025)
- Spending: ¥244,294 billion 38.6% of GDP (2025)
- Economic aid: donor: ODA, $10.37 billion (2016)
- Credit rating: Standard & Poor's: A+ (Domestic); A+ (Foreign); AA+ (T&C Assessment); Outlook: Stable; Moody's: A1; Outlook: Stable; Fitch: A; Outlook: Stable
- All values, unless otherwise stated, are in US dollars.

The economy of Japan is a highly developed mixed market economy with dirigiste characteristics with Keynesian economics, It is known as an East Asian model for its public investment into strategic sectors. Japan is the fourth-largest economy in the world by nominal GDP and the fifth-largest by purchasing power parity (PPP). It constituted 3.7% of the world's economy on a nominal basis in 2024. A founding member of the G7 and an early member of the OECD, Japan was the first country in Asia to achieve developed country status. In 2024, Japan was the sixth-largest in the world as an importer and eight-largest as an exporter. The country also has the world's fourth-largest consumer market, and consumption accounts for around 53% of GDP.

Long having been an agricultural country, it has been estimated that Japan’s economy was among the top ten in the world by size before the industrial revolution started. Industrialisation in Japan began in the 19th century with the Meiji Restoration, initially focusing on the textile industry and later on heavy industries. The country rapidly built its colonial empire. After the defeat in the Second World War, Japan’s economy recovered, primarily propelled by its lucrative manufacturing exporting industries. Japan was the Third largest economy in the world from the 1990s to 2000s, and on a nominal per capita basis, the most high-income among the G7 countries in the 1980s and 1990s. Since the collapse of the Japanese asset price bubble in the early 1990s, the country has experienced a prolonged period of economic stagnation referred to as the Lost Decades.

The country has the world's second-largest foreign-exchange reserves, worth $1.4 trillion. Japan has the third-largest financial assets in the world, valued at $12 trillion, or 8.6% of the global GDP total as of 2020. Japan has a highly efficient social security system, which comprises roughly 23.5% of GDP. The Tokyo Stock Exchange is the world's fourth-largest stock exchange by market capitalisation as of 2025. Japan has a highly service-dominated economy, making up 70% of GDP. The country's automobile industry is the third largest in the world. In 2022, Japan spent around 3.7% of GDP on research and development. As of 2025, 38 of the Fortune Global 500 companies are based in Japan.

== History ==
The economic history of Japan is one of the most studied. Major milestones in modern Japan's economic progress include:

- The foundation of the Tokugawa shogunate based in Edo (in 1603), initiating a period of internal economic development.
- The Meiji Restoration (in 1868) leading to Japan becoming the first non-European modern world power.
- Japan's defeat in World War II (in 1945), after which the island nation rose to become the world's second-largest economy.
- The Lost Decades (the 1990s, 2000s and 2010s), during which the country struggled to get out of deflation and extremely low or negative growth.

=== Edo period (1603–1868) ===
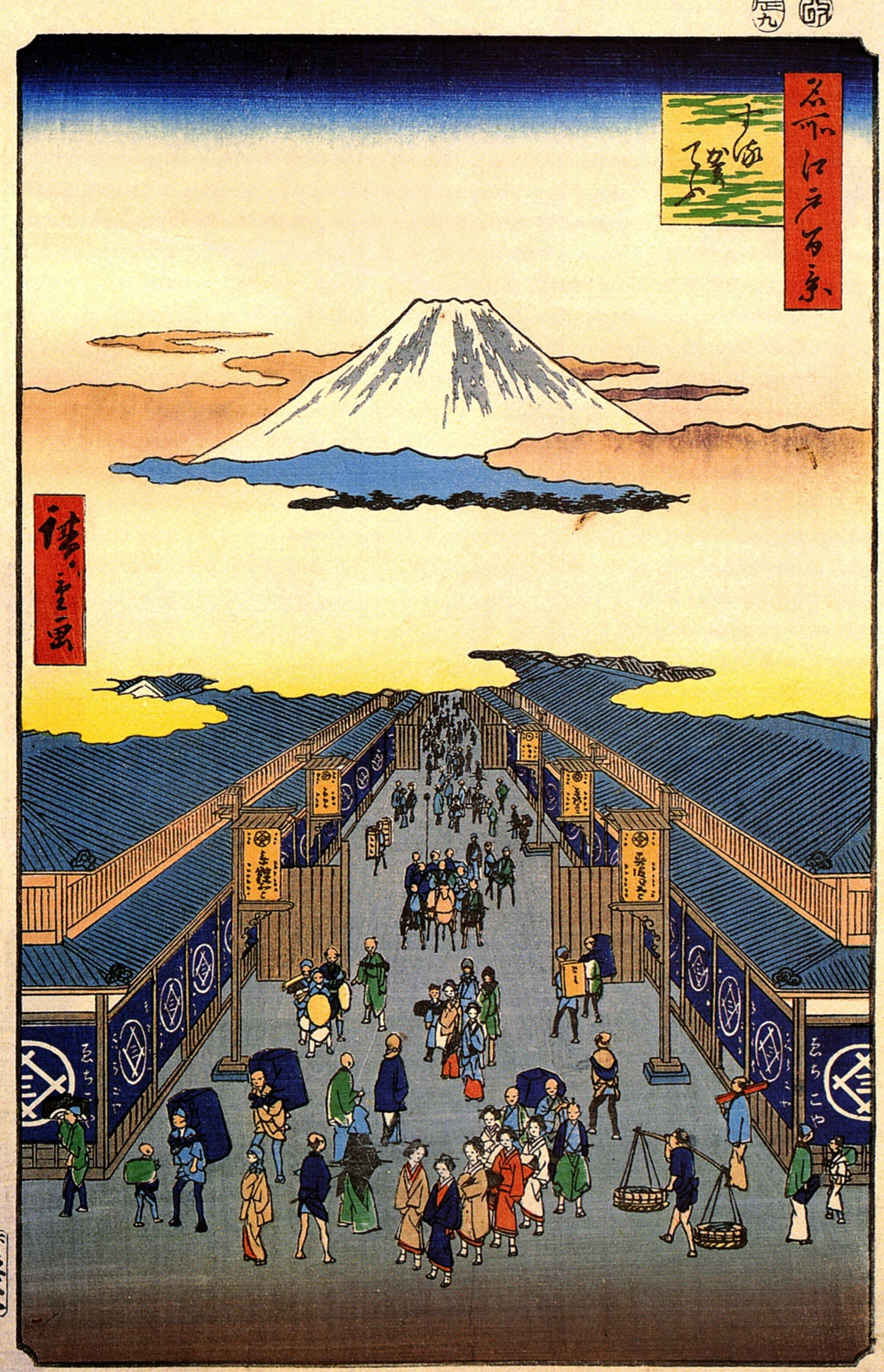
An 1856 ukiyo-e depicting Echigoya, the current Mitsukoshi

The beginning of the Edo period coincides with the last decades of the Nanban trade period, marked by intense interaction with European powers. Japan built its first Western-style warships, such as the San Juan Bautista, and commissioned around 350 Red Seal Ships for intra-Asian commerce. Japanese adventurers, such as Yamada Nagamasa, were active throughout Asia.

To eradicate Christian influence, Japan entered a period of isolation called sakoku in the 1630s, which led to economic stability and mild progress. In the 1650s, Japanese export porcelain production increased significantly due to a civil war in China, mainly in Kyushu. This trade dwindled by the 1740s under renewed Chinese competition but resumed after Japan’s mid-19th century opening.

Economic development during the Edo period included urbanisation, increased commodity shipping, and expanded domestic and foreign commerce. The construction trades, banking facilities, and merchant associations flourished. Daimyō-led authorities (han) oversaw rising agricultural production and rural handicrafts. By the mid-18th century, Edo had a population of over 1 million, while Osaka and Kyoto each had more than 400,000 inhabitants, becoming centres for trade and handicraft production. Rice, the economy’s base, was taxed at about 40% of the harvest and sold at the fudasashi market in Edo. Daimyō used forward contracts similar to modern futures trading to sell rice before harvest.

During the sakoku period, Japan studied Western sciences and techniques (rangaku) through Dutch traders in Dejima, including geography, medicine, natural sciences, astronomy, and mechanical sciences. Japan reopened its economy to the West after being pressured by the United States twice in 1853 and 1854.

=== Meiji and Imperial Period (1868–1945) ===
Since the mid-19th century, after the Meiji Restoration, the country was opened up to Western commerce and influence and went through a period of economic development that extended through to the First World War. Economic developments of the prewar period began with the "Rich State and Strong Army Policy" by the Meiji government. During "the Meiji period (1868–1912), leaders inaugurated a new Western-based education system for all young people, sent thousands of students to" Europe and the United States, "and hired more than 3,000 Westerners to teach modern science, mathematics, technology, and foreign languages in Japan" (Oyatoi gaikokujin). The government also built an extensive railway network, "improved roads, and inaugurated a land reform program to prepare the country for further development."

To promote industrialisation, "the government decided that, while it should help private business to allocate resources and to plan, the private sector was best equipped to stimulate economic growth. The greatest role of government was to help provide" good economic conditions for business. "In short, government was to be the guide and business the producer. In the early Meiji period, the government built factories and shipyards that were sold to entrepreneurs at a fraction of their value. Many of these businesses grew rapidly into the larger conglomerates" such as Mitsubishi. "Government emerged as chief promoter of private enterprise, enacting a series of" pro-business policies.

=== Post-war period (1945–1991) ===
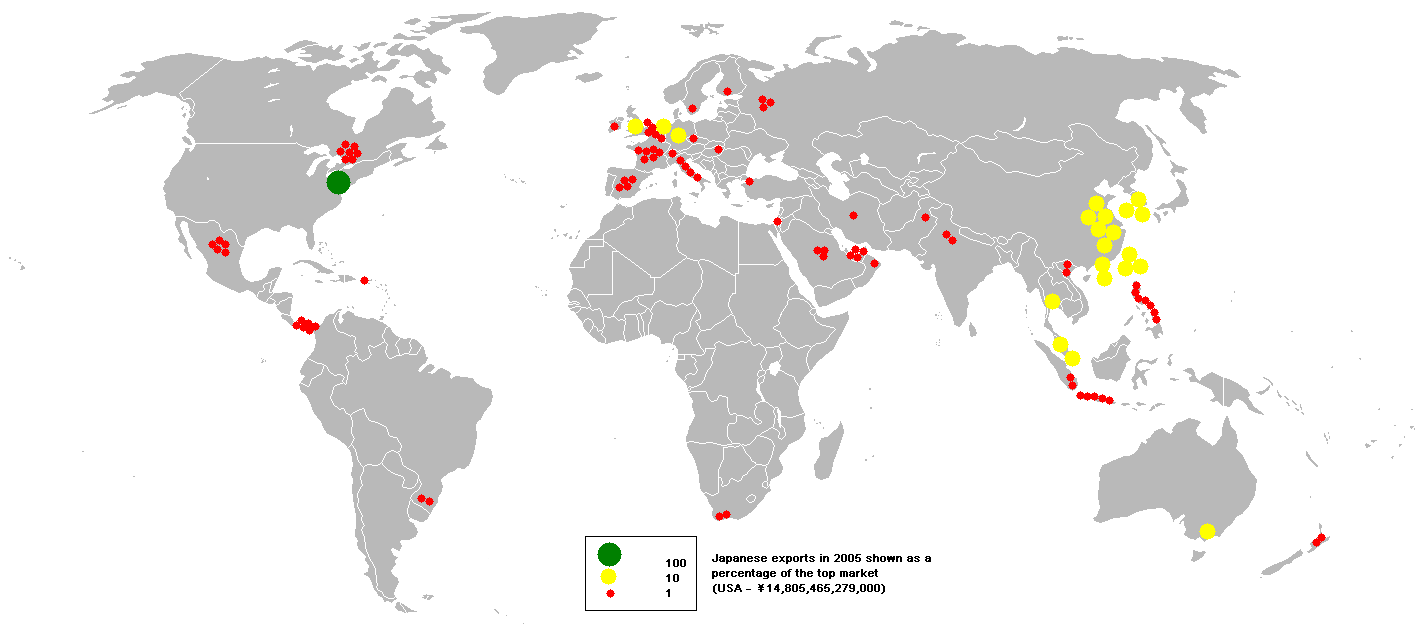
Japanese exports partners in 2005

Japan underwent significant economic transformation and rapid recovery and growth, emerging from the devastation of the Second World War to become a global economic powerhouse. The immediate post-war period saw Japan slowly recovering as a democratic nation under the Allied Occupation. The Korean War (1950–1953), which happened in its now divided former colony, boosted the economy, as Japan served as a major supply hub for U.S. forces. By the 1950s and 1960s, Japan’s economy had entered a period of high growth, often referred to as the 'Japanese Economic Miracle'. Key factors in this growth included government-industry cooperation, a strong work ethic, advanced technology, and a focus on export-oriented manufacturing. Japan’s economy diversified from textiles to steel, shipbuilding, and eventually electronics and automobiles, with companies such as Toyota, Sony, Hitachi and Honda becoming household names worldwide.

In 1968, Japan became the world’s third-largest economy and then the second largest in the 1980s, surpassing the Soviet Union, a position it held until it was surpassed by China in 2010. The government played a crucial role through policies that promoted industrial expansion and technological advancement. Japan’s emphasis on quality control and continuous improvement (kaizen) further boosted its international competitiveness. By the 1980s, Japan was leading in a wide range of industries, including automotive and consumer electronics, and was known for its formidable trade surplus and wealth. However, the late 1980s also saw the infamous Plaza Accord and the formation of an asset price bubble, with inflated real estate and stock market prices, setting the stage for the economic stagnation of the 'Lost Decades' that followed.

=== Lost Decades and Abenomics (1991–2019) ===
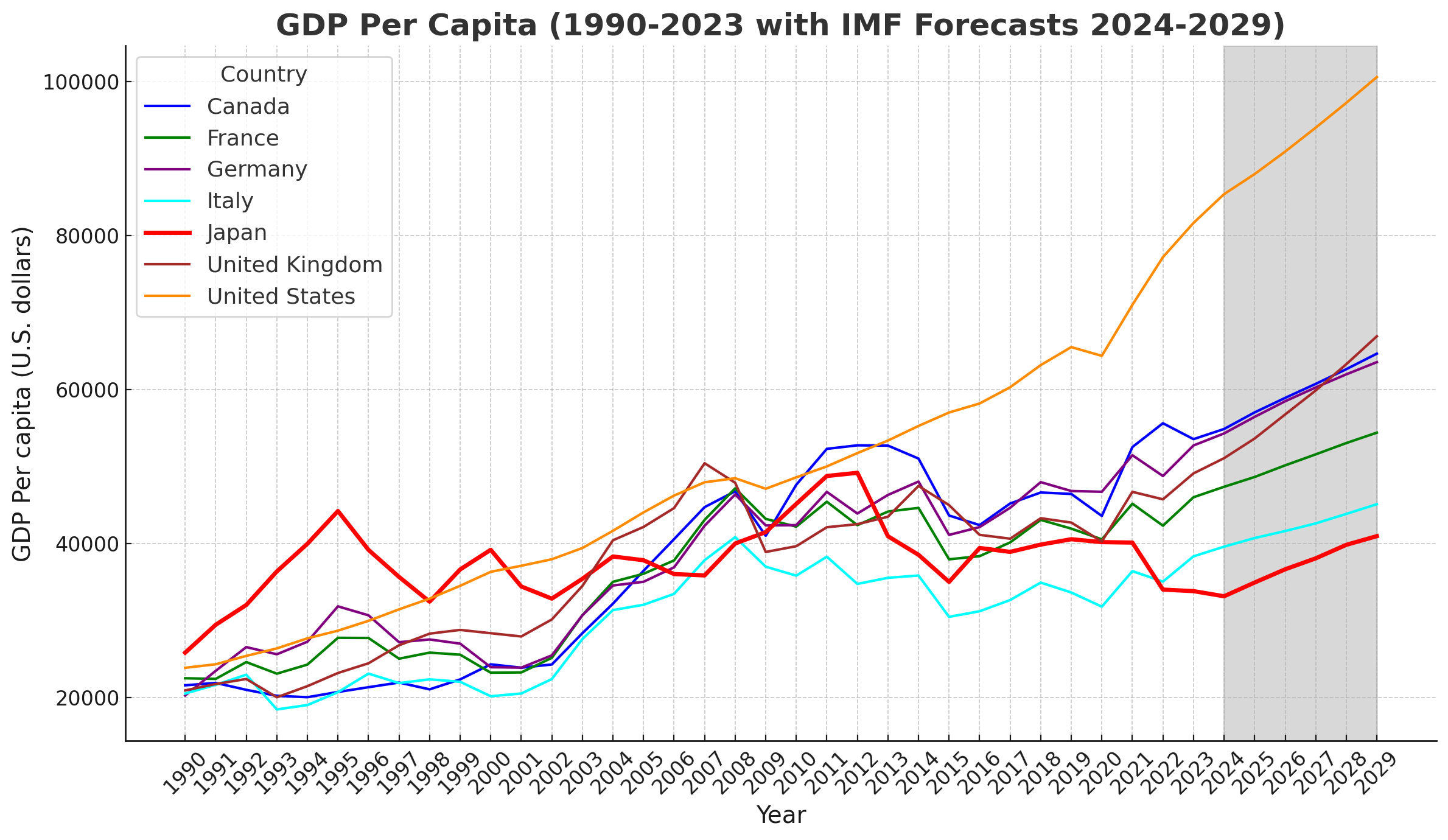
Japan's nominal GDP per capita stagnated around $40,000 for the entire period.

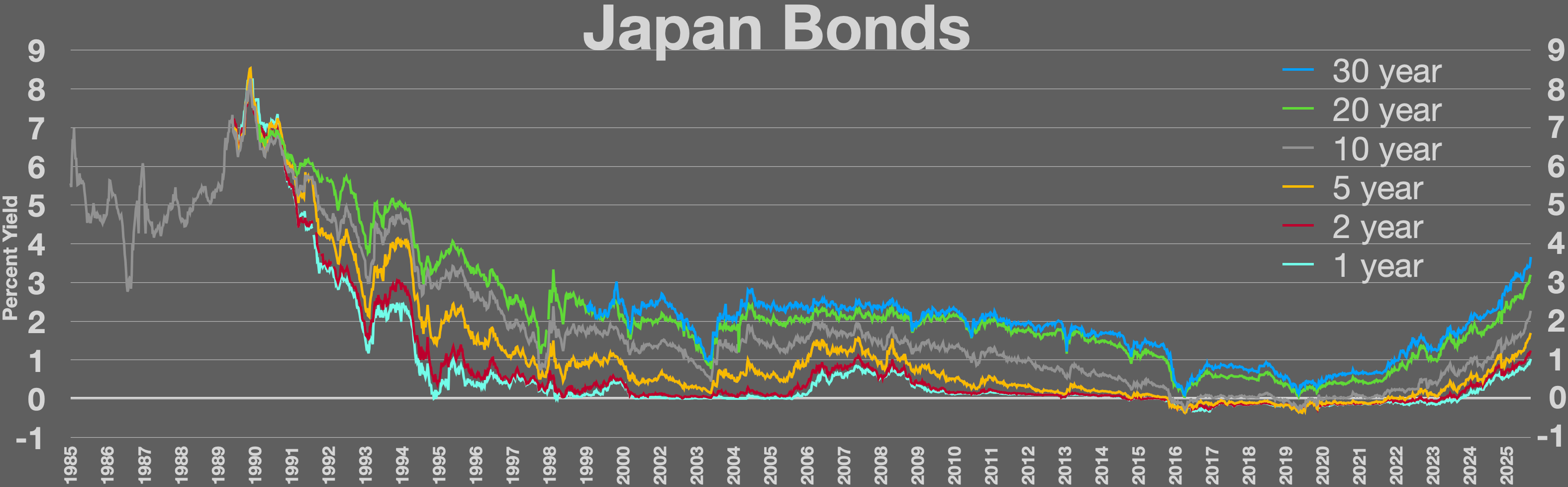
Japan bonds Inverted yield curve in 1990 Zero interest-rate policy started in 1999 Negative interest policy started in 2016 30 year 20 year 10 year 5 year 2 year 1 year

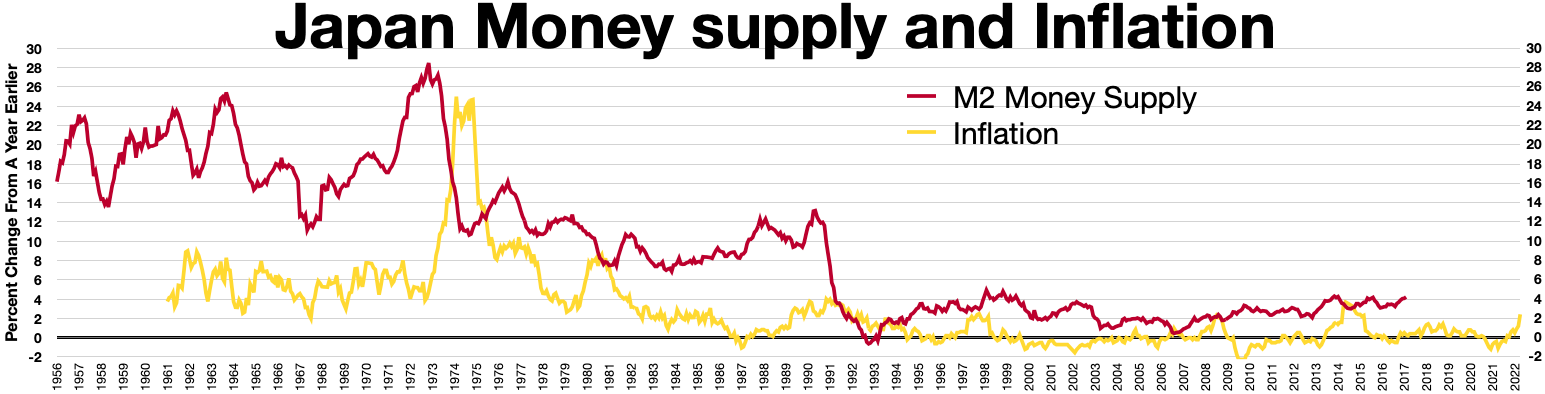
Japan money supply and inflation (year over year) M2 money supply Inflation

Growth slowed markedly in the late 1990s, also termed the Lost Decade, after the collapse of the Japanese asset price bubble. As a consequence Japan ran massive budget deficits (added trillions in yen to the Japanese financial system) to finance large public works programs.

By 1998, Japan's public works projects still could not stimulate demand enough to end the economy's stagnation. In desperation, the Japanese government undertook "structural reform" policies intended to wring speculative excesses from the stock and real estate markets. Unfortunately, these policies led Japan into deflation on numerous occasions between 1999 and 2004. The Bank of Japan used quantitative easing to expand the country's money supply in order to raise expectations of inflation and spur economic growth. Initially, the policy failed to induce any growth, but it eventually began to affect inflationary expectations. By late 2005, the economy finally began what seems to be a sustained recovery. GDP growth for that year was 2.8%, with an annualised fourth quarter expansion of 5.5%, surpassing the growth rates of the US and European Union during the same period. Unlike previous recovery trends, domestic consumption has been the dominant factor of growth.

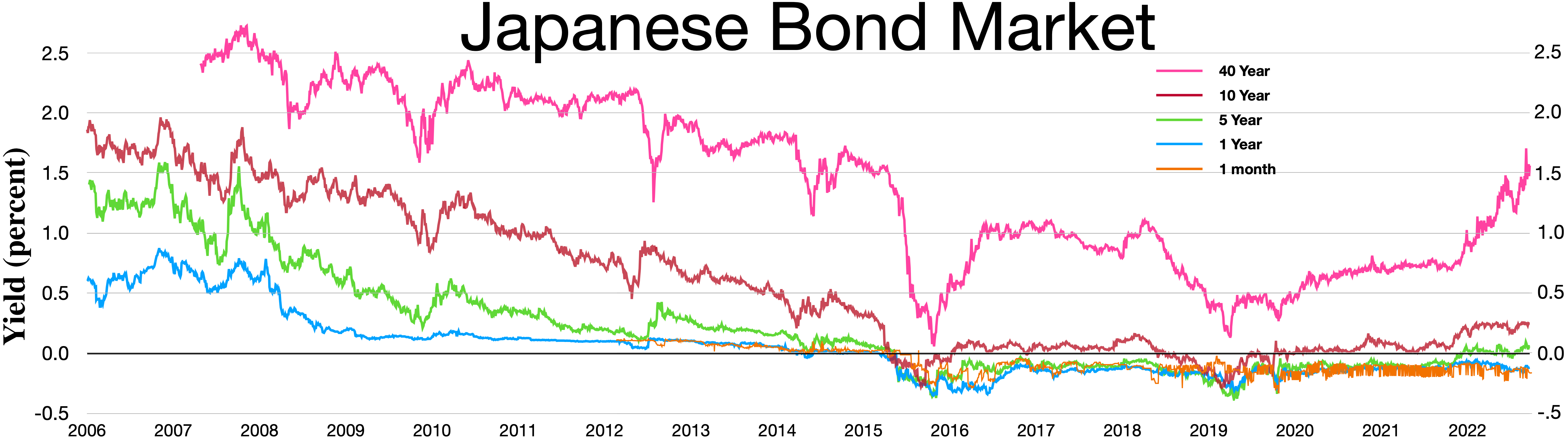
Japanese bond market Negative interest rates started in 2014. 40 year bond 10 year bond 5 year bond 1 year bond 1 month bond

Despite having interest rates down near zero for a long period of time, the quantitative easing strategy did not succeed in stopping price deflation. This led some economists, such as Paul Krugman, and some Japanese politicians, to advocate the generation of higher inflation expectations. In July 2006, the zero-rate policy was ended. In 2008, the Japanese Central Bank still had the lowest interest rates in the developed world, but deflation had still not been eliminated and the Nikkei 225 has fallen over approximately 50% (between June 2007 and December 2008). However, on 5 April 2013, the Bank of Japan announced that it would be purchasing 60–70 trillion yen in bonds and securities in an attempt to eliminate deflation by doubling the money supply in Japan over the course of two years. Markets around the world have responded positively to the government's current proactive policies, with the Nikkei 225 adding more than 42% since November 2012. The Economist has suggested that improvements to bankruptcy law, land transfer law, and tax laws will aid Japan's economy. In recent years, Japan has been the top export market for almost 15 trading nations worldwide.

In December 2018, a free trade agreement between Japan and the European Union was cleared to commence in February 2019. It creates the world's largest free trade zone valued at 1/3rd of global gross domestic product. This reduces tariffs on Japanese cars by 10%, duties by 30% on cheese and 10% on wines and opens service markets.

=== 2020–21 recession ===
In early January 2020, Japanese economy began to suffer from the COVID-19 pandemic. In early April, Japanese Prime Minister Shinzo Abe announced a state of emergency. Less than a quarter of Japanese people expected living conditions to improve in the coming decades. In October 2020 during the pandemic, Japan and the United Kingdom formally signed the first free-trade agreement post-Brexit, which will boost trade by approximately £15.2 billion. It enables tariff-free trade on 99% of exports to Japan. On 15 February 2021, the Nikkei average breached the 30k benchmark, the highest since November 1991. It was due to strong corporate earnings, GDP data and optimism over the COVID-19 vaccination program in the country.

=== Post-recession (2021–present) ===
As of 2021, Japan has significantly higher public debt than other developed nations, at approximately 260% of GDP. 45% of this debt is held by the Bank of Japan, and most of the remainder is also held domestically. The Japanese economy faces considerable challenges posed by an ageing and declining population, which peaked at 128.5 million people in 2010 and has fallen to 122.6 million people in 2024. In 2024, the country's working age population consisted of approximately 59.6% of the total population, which was the lowest rate among all the OECD countries. According to 2023 government projections, the country's population will fall to 87 million by 2070, with only 45 million of working age.

At the end of March 2022, the Ministry of Finance announced that the national debt reached precisely 1.017 million billion yen. The total public debt of the country, which includes debts contracted by local governments, represents 1.210 million billion yen (9,200 billion dollars) which is nearly 250% of Japan's GDP. Economist Kohei Iwahara said such an exceptional debt to GDP level is only possible because Japanese hold most of the debt: "“Japanese households hold most of their savings in bank accounts (48%) and these sums are used by commercial banks to buy Japanese government bonds. Thus, 85.7% of these bonds are held by Japanese investors.”

The Bank of Japan's main policy aim since the Lost Decades started had been to end deflation and eventually achieve 2% inflation. The increased international economic tension brought about by events such as the 2022 Russian invasion of Ukraine finally helped the country achieve the much-anticipated inflation target of 2%, and the negative interest policy was ended in March 2024. However, while other major economies focus on suppressing inflation by raising interest rates, Japan aims to firmly establish inflation by maintaining low rates. As a side effect, the Japanese yen has become extremely weak, hitting a 37.5-year low of 161 yen/USD in July 2024. Furthermore, the real effective exchange rate in May 2024, when the 2020 average is set at 100, is 68.65, the lowest level since the start of the Bank of Japan statistics in January 1970, due to a combination of low inflation in Japan and a relatively low trade share. This devaluation of the currency caused Japan to lose its status as the world’s third largest economy to Germany in nominal terms, which was approximately half the size of the country's economy a decade earlier.

Factors such as an apparent end to the 30-year struggle against deflation, improvements in corporate governance, and high corporate profits boosted the stock market. Consequently, both the Nikkei 225 and TOPIX indices surpassed the record highs they reached more than 30 years ago in 2024. The market capitalisation of the Tokyo Stock Exchange’s prime section exceeded a quadrillion yen for the first time in July 2024. In June 2026, the Bank of Japan raised its short-term policy rate by 0.25 to "around 1 per cent", the highest policy rate since 1995. Analysts described the move as a milestone in monetary normalisation.

== Macroeconomic trend ==
Driven by speculative investments and excessive lending, the Japanese asset price bubble of the early 1990s burst, triggering a prolonged period of economic stagnation marked by deflation and persistently low or negative growth, now known as the Lost Decades. From 1995 to 2023, the country’s GDP fell from $5.5 trillion to $4.2 trillion in nominal terms. At the turn of the 21st century, the Bank of Japan set out to encourage growth through a policy of quantitative easing, with the central bank purchasing government bonds at an unprecedented scale to address the persisting deflationary pressure. In 2016, the Bank of Japan introduced a negative interest policy to stimulate economic growth and combat persistent deflationary pressure. A combination of domestic policies and global economic conditions helped the country achieve its 2% inflation target, leading to the conclusion of the policy in 2024.

Japan used to run a considerable trade surplus, but the decline of the manufacturing sector since the 1980s and increased fossil fuel imports after the Fukushima nuclear accident in 2011 have changed this trend in recent years.

=== GDP composition ===
Industries by GDP value-added 2012. Values are converted using the exchange rate on 13 April 2013.

Industry	GDP value-added billions 2018	% of total GDP
Other service activities	1,238	23.5%
Manufacturing	947	18.0%
Real estate	697	13.2%
Wholesale and retail trade	660	12.5%
Transport and communication	358	6.8%
Public administration	329	6.2%
Construction	327	6.2%
Finance and insurance	306	5.8%
Electricity, gas and water supply	179	3.4%
Government service activities	41	0.7%
Mining	3	0.1%
Total	5,268	100%

=== Development of main indicators ===
Real GDP growth rate

The following table shows the main economic indicators in 1980–2025 (with IMF staff estimates in 2026–2031). Inflation under 5% is in green.

Year	GDP (in bn. US$PPP)	GDP per capita (in US$ PPP)	GDP (in bn. US$nominal)	GDP per capita (in US$ nominal)	GDP growth (real)	Inflation rate (in Per cent)	Unemployment (in Per cent)	Government debt (in % of GDP)
1980	1,046.3	8,960.1	1,155.2	9,892.9	▲3.2%	▲7.8%	2.0%	41.4%
1981	▲1,194.0	▲10,151.4	▲1,273.7	▲10,828.4	▲4.3%	▲4.9%	▲2.2%	▲45.8%
1982	▲1,309.4	▲11,054.4	▼1,185.2	▼10,005.9	▲3.3%	▲2.7%	▲2.4%	▲50.1%
1983	▲1,410.1	▲11,822.5	▲1,299.9	▲10,898.7	▲3.6%	▲1.9%	▲2.7%	▲55.1%
1984	▲1,525.4	▲12,706.5	▲1,376.6	▲11,466.7	▲4.4%	▲2.3%	2.7%	▲56.9%
1985	▲1,654.9	▲13,699.0	▲1,459.6	▲12,082.9	▲5.2%	▲2.1%	▼2.6%	▲59.2%
1986	▲1,743.8	▲14,358.5	▲2,168.5	▲17,855.9	▲3.3%	▲0.6%	▲2.8%	▲64.2%
1987	▲1,870.1	▲15,324.5	▲2,639.7	▲21,631.6	▲4.6%	▲0.1%	▲2.9%	▲65.8%
1988	▲2,065.0	▲16,850.4	▲3,197.1	▲26,088.9	▲6.7%	▲0.7%	▼2.5%	▼62.4%
1989	▲2,251.7	▲18,302.0	▼3,180.5	▼25,851.8	▲4.9%	▲2.3%	▼2.3%	▼56.9%
1990	▲2,449.0	▲19,840.0	▲3,258.7	▲26,399.4	▲4.8%	▲3.1%	▼2.1%	▼54.8%
1991	▲2,621.1	▲21,149.7	▲3,731.4	▲30,109.5	▲3.5%	▲3.3%	2.1%	▼54.1%
1992	▲2,704.9	▲21,749.6	▲4,071.7	▲32,739.0	▲0.9%	▲1.7%	▲2.2%	▲57.9%
1993	▲2,756.3	▲22,091.3	▲4,640.6	▲37,193.3	▼-0.5%	▲1.3%	▲2.5%	▲63.2%
1994	▲2,841.1	▲22,707.6	▲5,104.1	▲40,794.5	▲0.9%	▲0.7%	▲2.9%	▲73.3%
1995	▲2,968.6	▲23,666.1	▲5,639.7	▲44,960.3	▲2.3%	▼-0.1%	▲3.2%	▲80.7%
1996	▲3,115.9	▲24,786.3	▼5,021.4	▼39,944.3	▲3.1%	▲0.1%	▲3.4%	▲85.3%
1997	▲3,212.8	▲25,496.6	▼4,579.8	▼36,344.3	▲1.4%	▲1.7%	3.4%	▲91.3%
1998	▼3,191.4	▼25,258.4	▼4,150.4	▼32,848.5	▼-1.8%	▲0.7%	▲4.1%	▲101.6%
1999	▲3,225.3	▲25,478.7	▲4,689.0	▲37,041.6	▼-0.3%	▼-0.3%	▲4.7%	▲113.5%
2000	▲3,396.6	▲26,780.2	▲5,042.4	▲39,756.6	▲3.0%	▼-0.7%	4.7%	▲118.5%
2001	▲3,482.9	▲27,396.1	▼4,438.8	▼34,914.7	▲0.3%	▼-0.7%	▲5.0%	▲126.8%
2002	▲3,540.1	▲27,786.9	▼4,245.9	▼33,327.6	▲0.1%	▼-0.9%	▲5.4%	▲134.6%
2003	▲3,659.8	▲28,673.9	▲4,573.4	▲35,832.1	▲1.4%	▼-0.3%	▼5.2%	▲140.2%
2004	▲3,837.6	▲30,043.5	▲4,941.5	▲38,685.8	▲2.1%	▼-0.0%	▼4.7%	▲148.8%
2005	▲4,031.1	▲31,554.0	▼4,875.6	▼38,165.0	▲1.8%	▼-0.2%	▼4.4%	▲153.4%
2006	▲4,219.7	▲33,031.5	▼4,648.1	▼36,385.1	▲1.5%	▲0.2%	▼4.1%	▼152.1%
2007	▲4,408.9	▲34,509.8	▼4,624.7	▼36,198.8	▲1.7%	▲0.1%	▼3.8%	▼150.4%
2008	▲4,441.4	▲34,781.9	▲5,160.2	▲40,411.2	▼-1.2%	▲1.4%	▲4.0%	▲153.6%
2009	▼4,203.5	▼32,955.7	▲5,336.8	▲41,840.4	▼-5.9%	▼-1.3%	▲5.1%	▲172.9%
2010	▲4,430.6	▲34,724.1	▲5,811.6	▲45,547.3	▲4.1%	▼-0.7%	5.1%	▲178.6%
2011	▲4,512.9	▲35,304.1	▲6,279.4	▲49,122.9	▼-0.2%	▼-0.3%	▼4.6%	▲190.6%
2012	▲4,672.8	▲36,634.3	▲6,333.8	▲49,656.7	▲1.6%	▼-0.1%	▼4.3%	▲197.1%
2013	▲4,847.2	▲38,067.4	▼5,272.3	▼41,405.7	▲2.0%	▲0.3%	▼4.0%	▲201.2%
2014	▲4,976.3	▲39,146.8	▼4,985.8	▼39,221.1	▲0.9%	▲2.8%	▼3.6%	▲203.6%
2015	▲5,112.9	▲40,266.3	▼4,534.4	▼35,710.6	▲1.8%	▲0.8%	▼3.4%	▼200.1%
2016	▲5,197.9	▲40,941.1	▲5,110.4	▲40,251.7	▲0.7%	▼-0.1%	▼3.1%	▲202.1%
2017	▲5,376.9	▲42,422.4	▼5,038.2	▼39,750.6	▲1.6%	▲0.5%	▼2.8%	▲203.1%
2018	▲5,464.3	▲43,197.6	▲5,154.3	▲40,746.9	▲0.8%	▲1.0%	▼2.4%	▲203.7%
2019	▲5,539.4	▲43,886.4	▲5,245.8	▲41,560.2	▼-0.3%	▲0.5%	2.4%	▲206.3%
2020	▼5,499.9	▼43,702.7	▼5,189.2	▼41,233.6	▼-4.3%	▼-0.0%	▲2.8%	▲228.8%
2021	▲5,813.0	▲46,321.7	▲5,227.0	▲41,652.2	▲3.6%	▼-0.2%	2.8%	▼222.6%
2022	▲6,305.4	▲50,418.1	▼4,444.9	▼35,541.7	▲1.2%	▲2.5%	▼2.6%	▲228.0%
2023	▲6,600.4	▲53,023.0	▼4,389.3	▼35,260.5	▲0.9%	▲3.3%	2.6%	▼220.1%
2024	▲6,774.0	▲54,677.0	▼4,207.6	▼33,962.5	▲0.1%	▲2.7%	▼2.5%	▼213.6%
2025	▲7,032.9	▲57,043.1	▲4,453.1	▲36,118.6	▲1.2%	▲3.2%	2.5%	▼204.8%
2026e	▲7,324.1	▲59,712.0	▼4,342.0	▼35,399.6	▲0.7%	▲2.0%	2.5%	▼199.4%
2027e	▲7,605.1	▲62,338.0	▲4,467.6	▲36,620.2	▲0.7%	▲2.6%	2.5%	▼196.4%
2028e	▲7,809.0	▲64,367.7	▲4,647.2	▲38,305.4	▲0.6%	▲2.0%	2.5%	▼193.8%
2029e	▲8,004.1	▲66,358.7	▲4,771.8	▲39,561.3	▲0.6%	▲2.0%	2.5%	▼191.5%
2030e	▲8,200.6	▲68,396.1	▲4,879.0	▲40,693.0	▲0.6%	▲2.0%	2.5%	▼190.1%
2031e	▲8,392.0	▲70,427.2	▲4,999.1	▲41,953.2	▲0.6%	▲2.0%	2.5%	▼188.9%

The average real income per household declined by 0.9% in 2025.

== Sectors of the economy ==
=== Agriculture, livestock and forestry ===
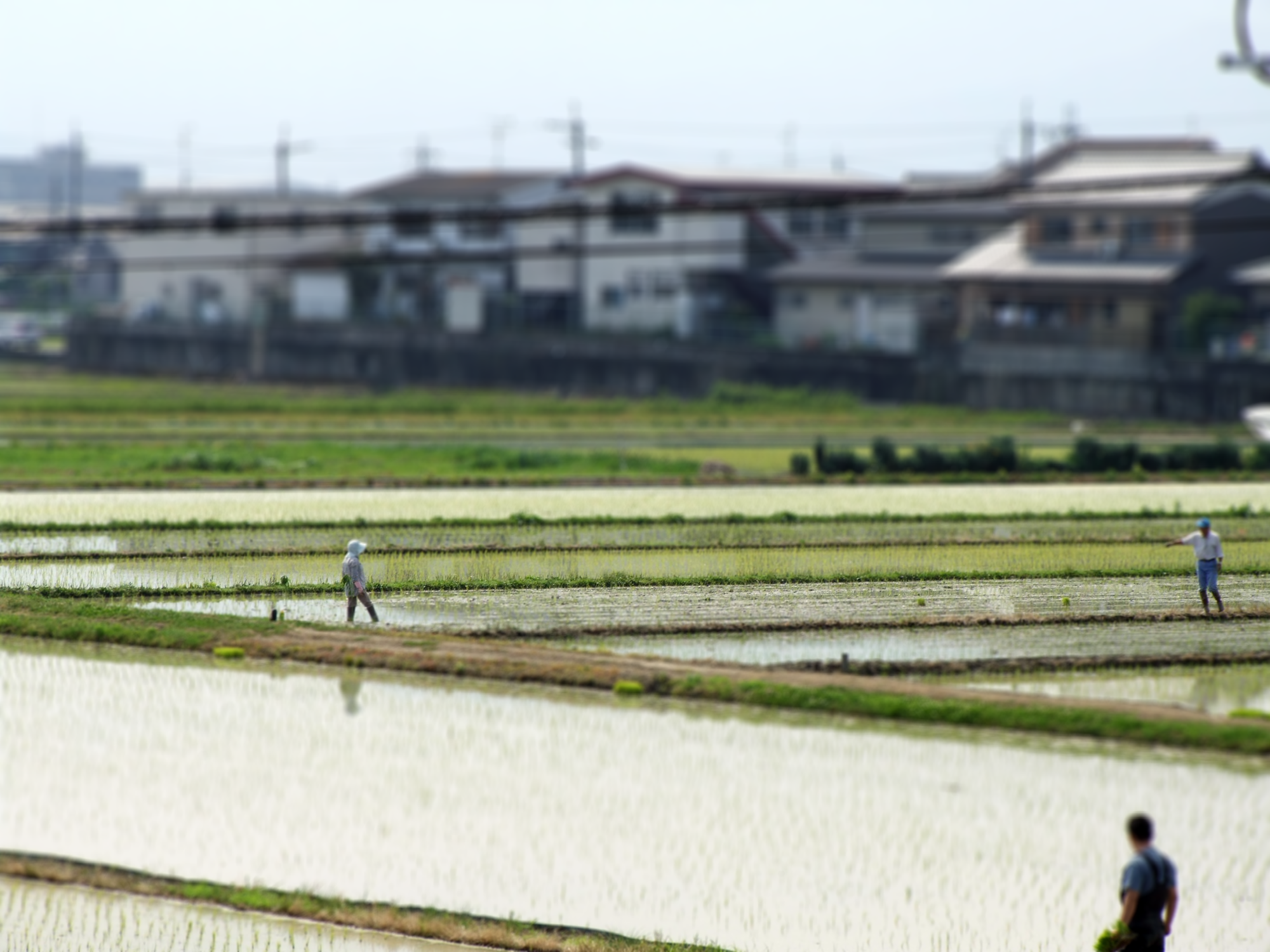
Rice is a very important crop in Japan as shown here in a rice paddy in Tawaramoto, Nara.

The Japanese agricultural sector accounts for about 1.1% (2017) of the total country's GDP. Only 12% of Japan's land is suitable for cultivation. Due to this lack of arable land, a system of terraces is used to farm in small areas. This results in one of the world's highest levels of crop yields per unit area, with an overall agricultural self-sufficiency rate of about 50% on fewer than 56,000 km^{2} (14 million acres) cultivated.

Japan's small agricultural sector, however, is also highly subsidised and protected, with government regulations that favour small-scale cultivation instead of large-scale agriculture as practiced in North America. There has been a growing concern about farming as the current farmers are aging with a difficult time finding successors.

Rice accounts for almost all of Japan's cereal production. Japan is the second-largest agricultural product importer in the world. Rice, the most protected crop, is subject to tariffs of 777.7%.

Although Japan is usually self-sufficient in rice (except for its use in making rice crackers and processed foods) and wheat, the country must import about 50% of its requirements of other grain and fodder crops and relies on imports for half of its supply of meat. Japan imports large quantities of wheat and soybeans. Japan is the 5th largest market for the European Union's agricultural exports. Over 90% of mandarin oranges in Japan are grown domestically. Apples are also grown due to restrictions on apple imports.

==== Fishery and whaling ====
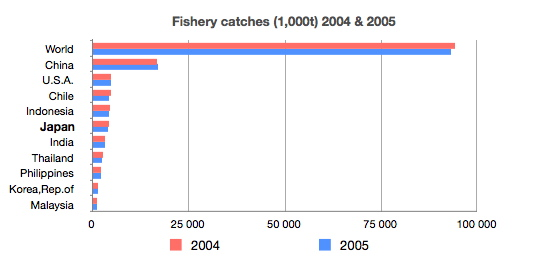
Global fish catch in Japan

Japan ranked fourth in the world in 1996 in tonnage of fish caught. Japan captured 4,074,580 metric tons of fish in 2005, down from 4,987,703 tons in 2000, 9,558,615 tons in 1990, 9,864,422 tons in 1980, 8,520,397 tons in 1970, 5,583,796 tons in 1960 and 2,881,855 tons in 1950. In 2003, the total aquaculture production was predicted at 1,301,437 tonnes. In 2010, Japan's total fisheries production was 4,762,469 fish. Offshore fisheries accounted for an average of 50% of the nation's total fish catches in the late 1980s although they experienced repeated ups and downs during that period.

Coastal fishing by small boats, set nets, or breeding techniques accounts for about one third of the industry's total production, while offshore fishing by medium-sized boats makes up for more than half the total production. Deep-sea fishing from larger vessels makes up the rest. Among the many species of seafood caught are sardines, skipjack tuna, crab, shrimp, salmon, pollock, squid, clams, mackerel, sea bream, sauries, tuna and Japanese amberjack. Freshwater fishing, including salmon, trout and eel hatcheries and fish farms, takes up about 30% of Japan's fishing industry. Among the nearly 300 fish species in the rivers of Japan are native varieties of catfish, chub, herring and goby, as well as such freshwater crustaceans as crabs and crayfish. Marine and freshwater aquaculture is conducted in all 47 prefectures in Japan.

Japan maintains one of the world's largest fishing fleets and accounts for nearly 15% of the global catch, prompting some claims that Japan's fishing is leading to depletion in fish stocks such as tuna. Japan has also sparked controversy by supporting quasi-commercial whaling.

=== Industry ===
Japanese manufacturing and industry is very diversified, with a variety of advanced industries that are highly successful. Industry accounts for 30.1% (2017) of the nation's GDP. The country's manufacturing output is the third highest in the world.

Industry is concentrated in several regions, with the Kantō region surrounding Tokyo, (the Keihin industrial region) as well as the Kansai region surrounding Osaka (the Hanshin industrial region) and the Tōkai region surrounding Nagoya (the Chūkyō–Tōkai industrial region) the main industrial centers. Other industrial centers include the southwestern part of Honshū and northern Shikoku around the Seto Inland Sea (the Setouchi industrial region); and the northern part of Kyūshū (Kitakyūshū). In addition, a long narrow belt of industrial centers called the Taiheiyō Belt is found between Tokyo and Fukuoka, established by particular industries, that have developed as mill towns.

Japan enjoys high technological development in many fields, including consumer electronics, automobile manufacturing, semiconductor manufacturing, optical fibers, optoelectronics, optical media, facsimile and copy machines, and fermentation processes in food and biochemistry. However, many Japanese companies are facing emerging rivals from the United States, South Korea, and Taiwan.

==== Automobile manufacturing ====
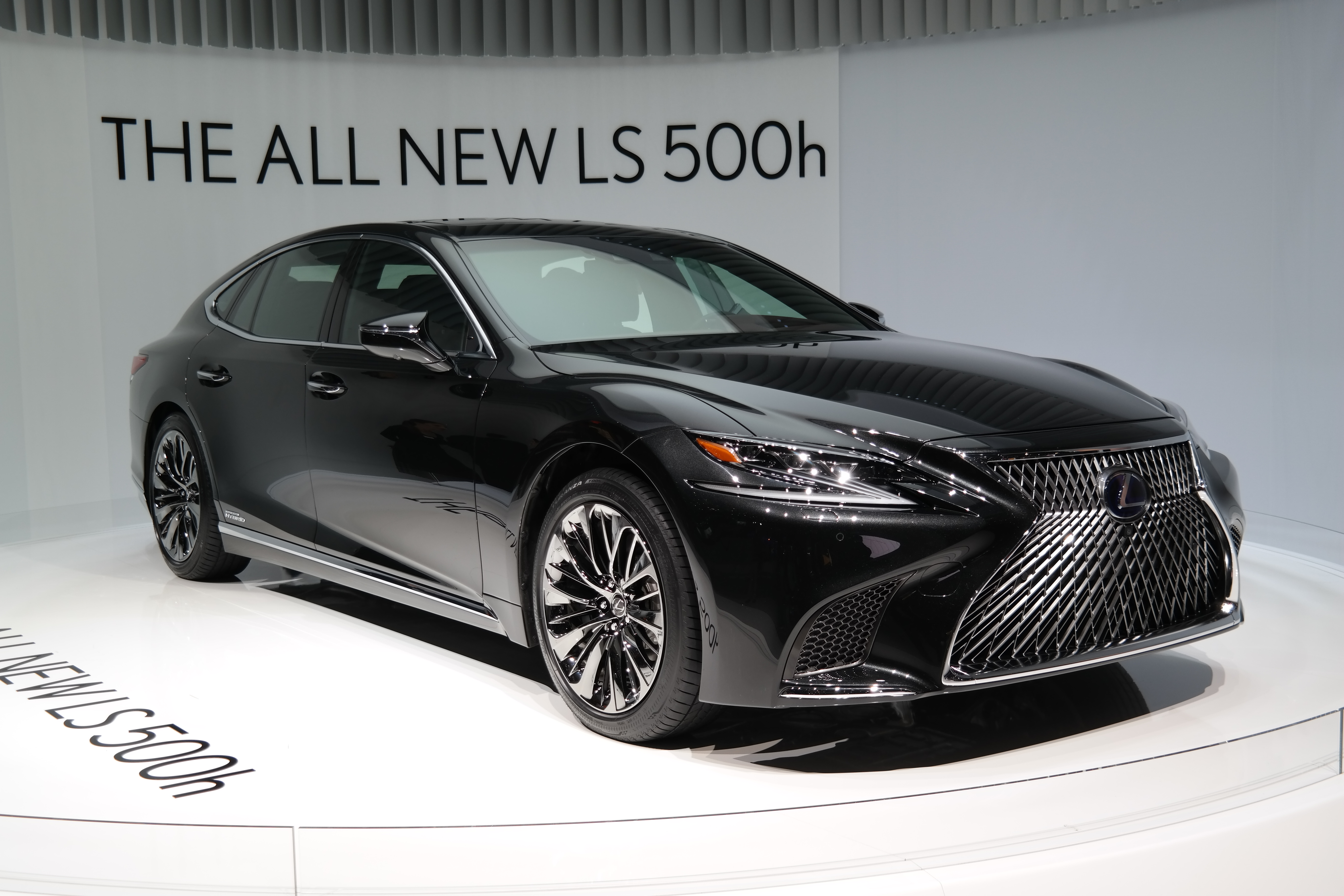
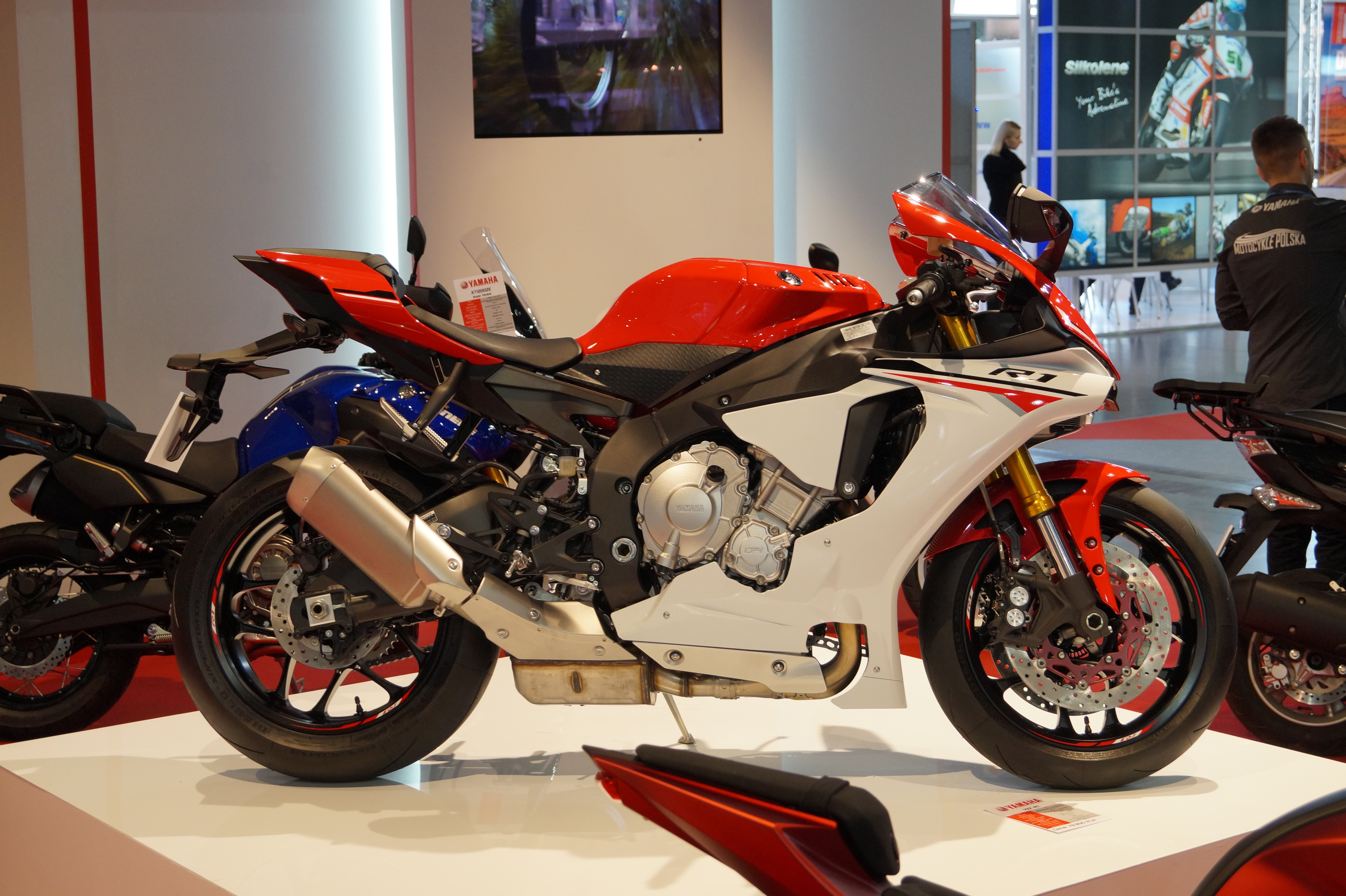
Lexus LS and Yamaha YZF-R1. The rapid growth and success of Toyota's Lexus and other Japanese car and motorcycle manufacturers reflects Japan's strength and global dominance in the automobile industry.

Japan is the third biggest producer of automobiles in the world. Toyota is currently the world's largest car maker, and the Japanese car makers Nissan, Honda, Suzuki, and Mazda also count for some of the largest car makers in the world. By number, Japan is the world's second-largest exporter of cars after China as of 2024.

The Japanese electric vehicle (EV) industry is transitioning from a hybrid-focused market to accelerating battery electric vehicle (BEV) adoption, particularly within the specialized kei car segment. Key players such as Nissan and Mitsubishi lead with models such as the Sakura and eK X EV, while other major manufacturers are increasingly investing in EV technology.

==== Chemical ====
The Japanese chemical industry is the world’s fourth-largest and the second largest manufacturing industry in Japan, focusing heavily on specialty chemicals, electronics materials, and advanced materials. Key corporations include Shin-Etsu Chemical, Mitsubishi Chemical Group, Sumitomo Chemical, and Asahi Kasei, with many firms pivoting toward carbon neutrality and high-tech sectors.

==== Construction ====
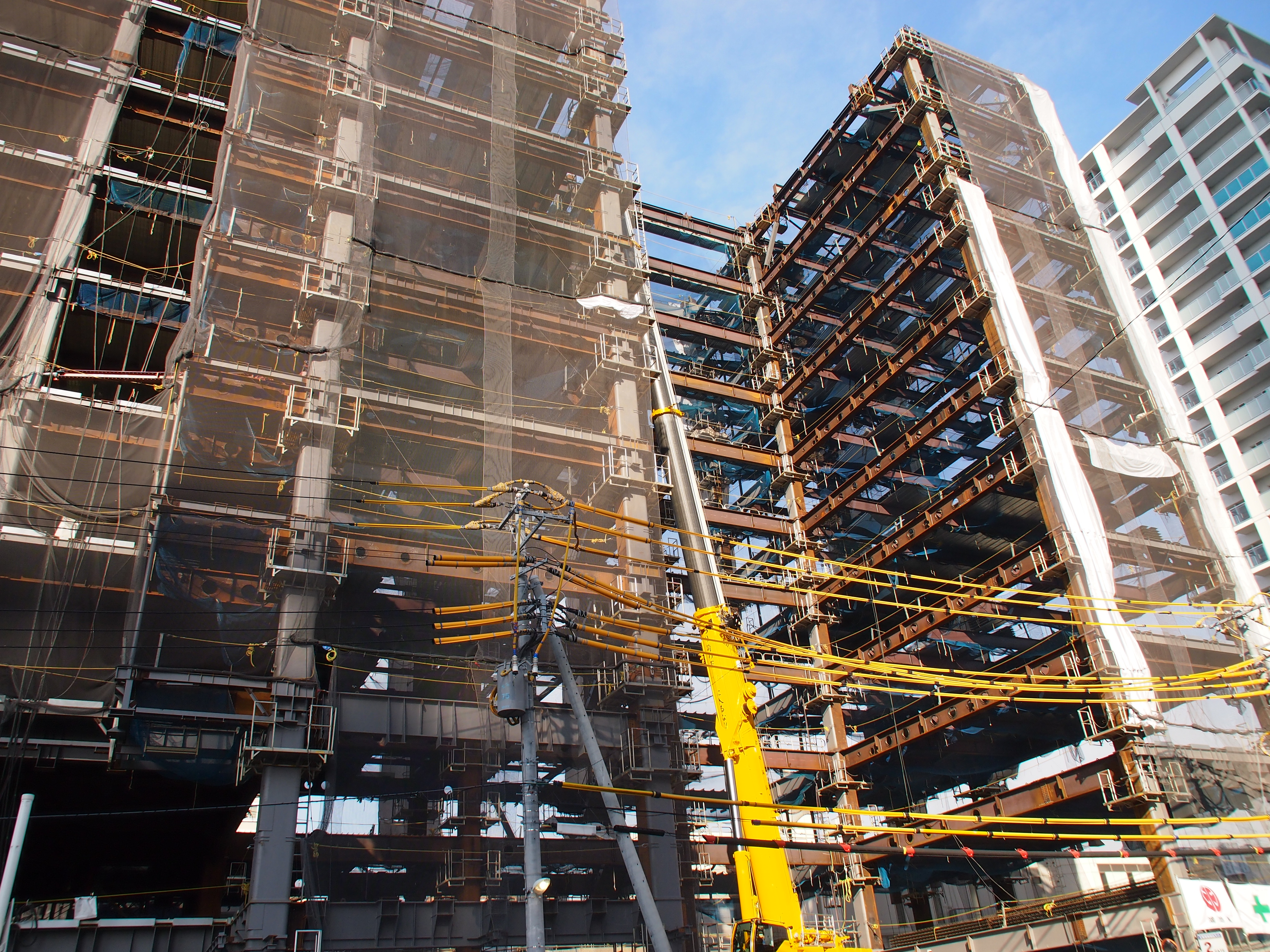
A construction site in Kawasaki, Kanagawa

The construction industry in Japan is a large component of the Japanese economy in terms of economic output and employment. Its history is one that mirrors closely the overall economic path of the country, from establishment of the capital during the feudal era, through economic modernization and imperial rule, and until today with the recovery and great economic expansion of Japan's post-war years. More recently, the industry has been influenced by preparations for major events, most notably the 2020 Summer Olympics, and a push towards sustainability. Contemporary challenges include maintaining access to labor and combating political corruption.

==== Defense ====
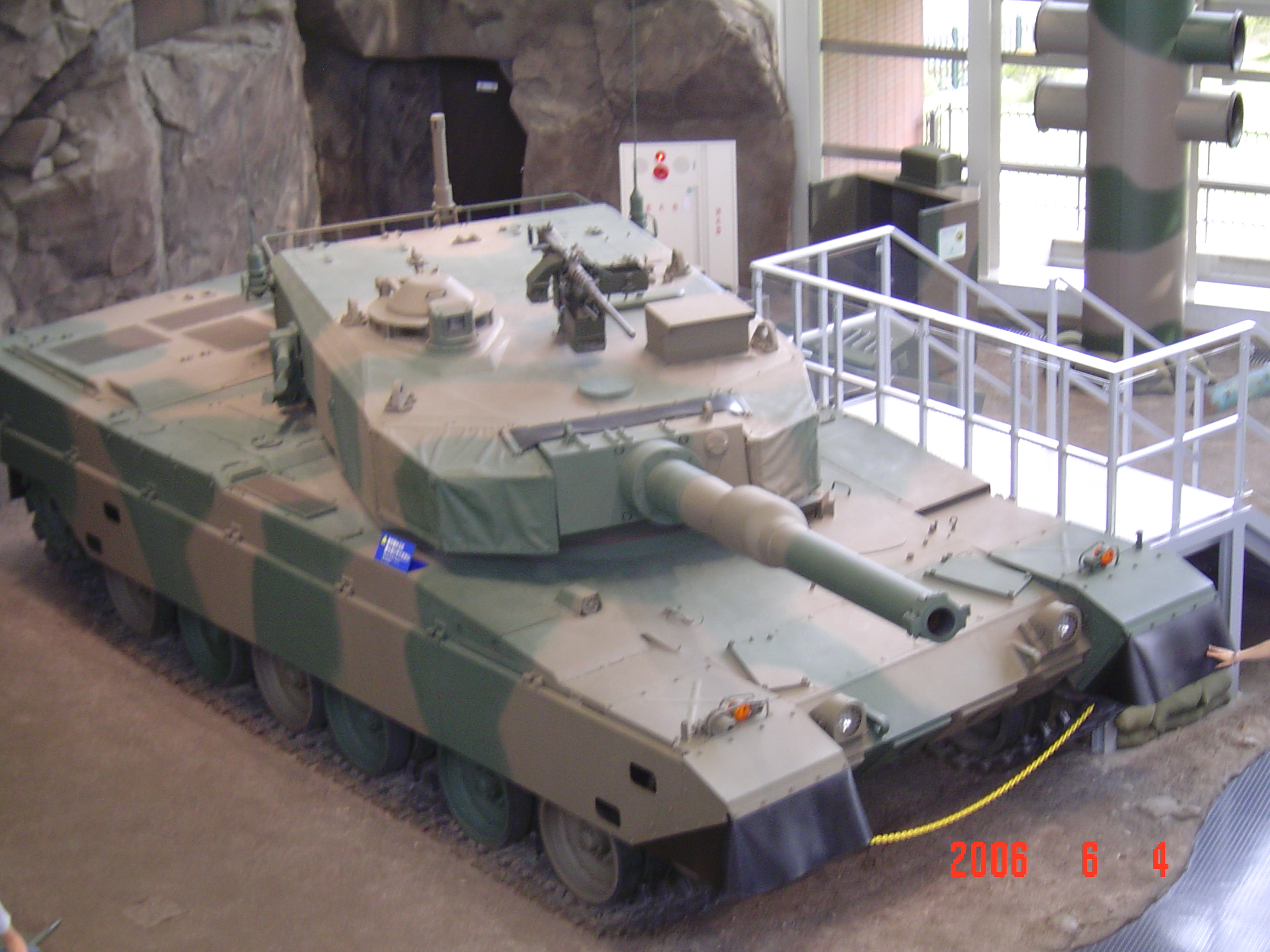
Type 90 Tank

The Japanese defense industry is the part of the Japanese economy responsible for the procurement of military technology, primarily for the nation's own Self-Defense Forces, largely due to a strict policy on national exports.

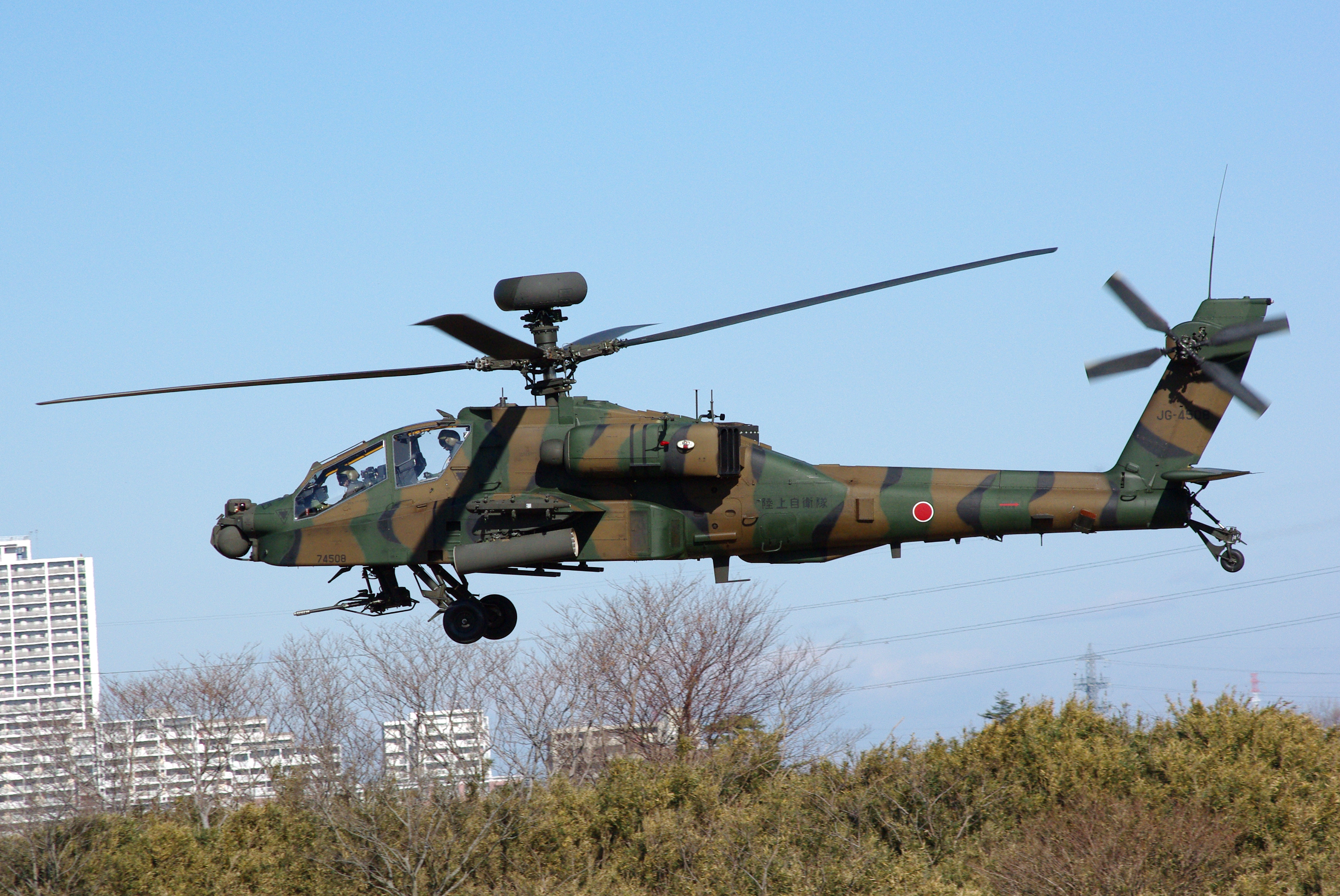
JGSDF AH-64D (DJP) attached to the 1st Airborne Brigade January 2012

==== Electronics manufacturing ====
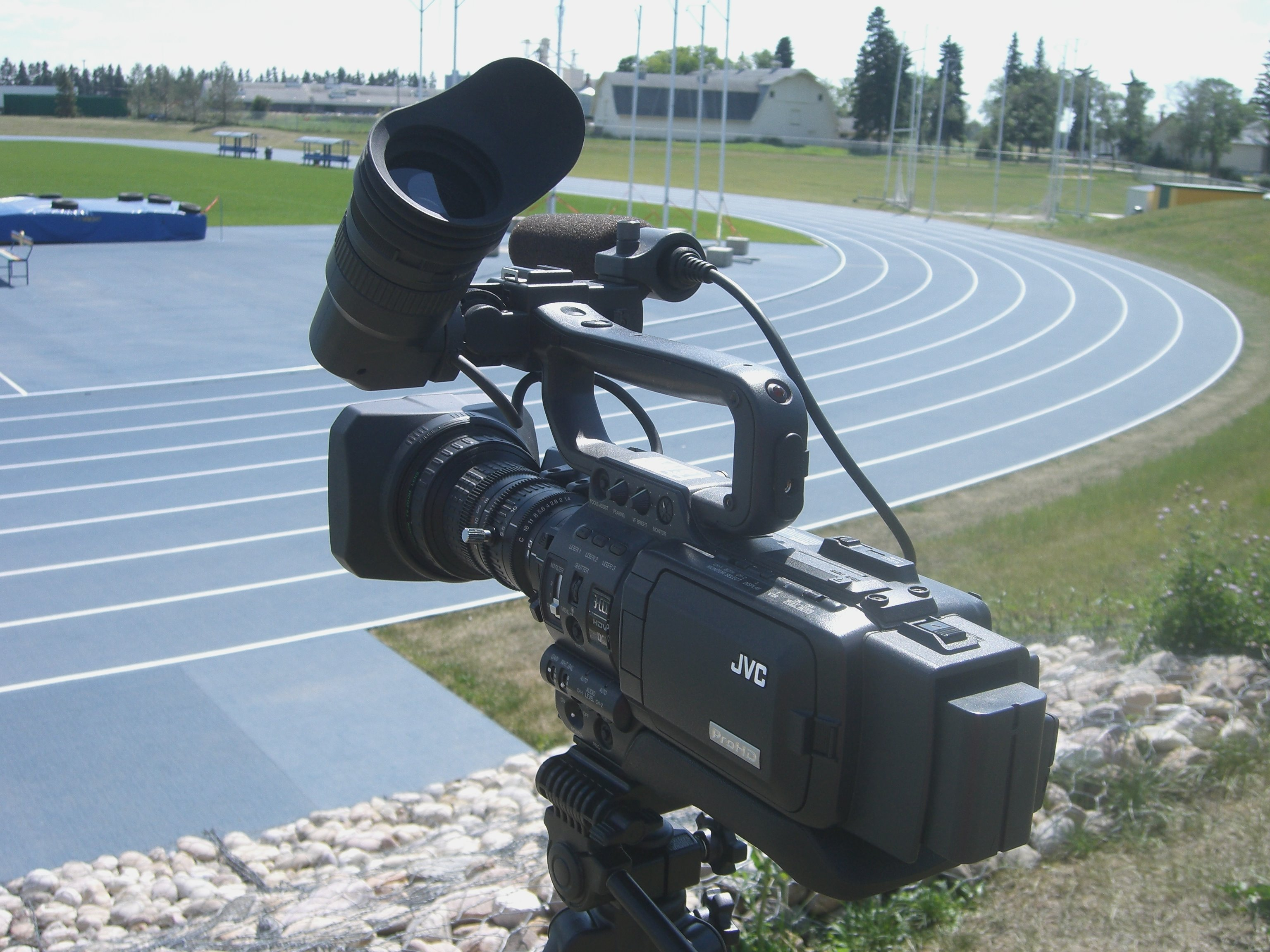
Professional video camera from JVC

In Japan, the electronics industry is one of the largest in the world, though the share of Japanese electronics companies has significantly declined from its peak due to competition from South Korea, Taiwan, China, and the United States.

Japanese companies have been responsible for a number of important innovations, including having pioneered the transistor radio and the Walkman (Sony), the first mass-produced laptops (Toshiba), the VHS recorder (JVC), and solar cells and LCD screens (Sharp).

==== Steel ====
Japan's steel industry is currently the world's fourth largest, focusing on high-quality steel production and primarily driven by major manufacturers such as Nippon Steel, JFE Steel, and Kobe Steel. Concentrated in regions such as Tokyo, Osaka-Kobe, and Kyushu, the sector is foundational to Japan's economy. Japan is a major exporter, with increasing competition from low-cost Chinese steel imports.

==== Shipbuilding ====
Japan's shipbuilding industry is currently the world's third-largest, holding roughly 10% of the market, that focus on bulk carriers, LNG carriers, and tankers. Major players such as Imabari Shipbuilding and Japan Marine United (JMU) dominate the market, with a strong push toward modernization and potential government-backed consolidation to regain market share from China and South Korea.

==== Pharmaceutical ====
Japan’s pharmaceutical market is the world's third-largest, valued at over 11.5 trillion yen in 2024, driven by an aging population, high demand for oncology and diabetes treatments, and a strong push toward generic drug usage. The industry is shifting from traditional medicine to biologics and specialized therapies, with major players such as Takeda Pharmaceutical Company and Daiichi Sankyo that are focusing on R&D for international expansion.

==== Mining ====
Japan's mining production has been minimal, and Japan has very little mining deposits. However, massive deposits of rare earths have been found off the coast of Japan. In the 2011 fiscal year, the domestic yield of crude oil was 820 thousand kiloliters, which was 0.4% of Japan's total crude processing volume.

In 2019, Japan was the 2nd largest world producer of iodine, 4th largest worldwide producer of bismuth, the world's 9th largest producer of sulfur and the 10th largest producer of gypsum.

=== Services ===
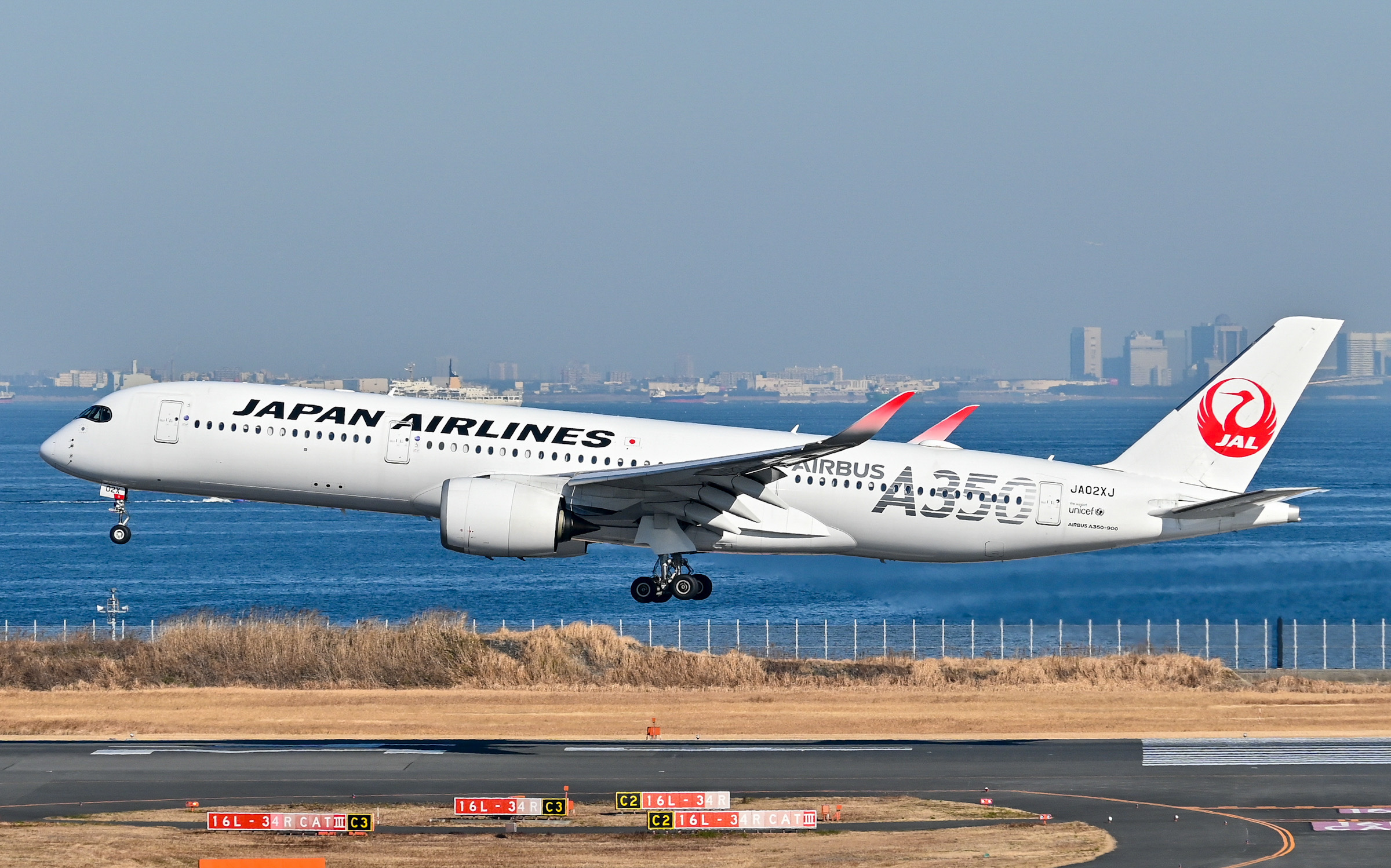
Japan Airlines is considered one of the largest airlines in the world.

Japan's service sector accounts for 68.7% (2017) of its total economic output. Banking, insurance, real estate, retailing, transportation, and telecommunications are all major industries such as MUFG, Mizuho, NTT, TEPCO, Nomura, Mitsubishi Estate, Aeon, Mitsui Sumitomo, Softbank, JR East, Seven & i Holdings, KDDI and Japan Airlines counting as some of the largest companies in the world. two of the five most circulated newspapers in the world are Japanese newspapers. The Koizumi government set Japan Post, one of the country's largest providers of savings and insurance services for privatisation by 2015. The six major keiretsus are the Mitsubishi, Sumitomo, Fuyo, Mitsui, Dai-Ichi Kangyo and Sanwa. Japan is home to 180 companies from the Forbes Global 2000 or 9% (as of 2013).

==== Finance and banking ====
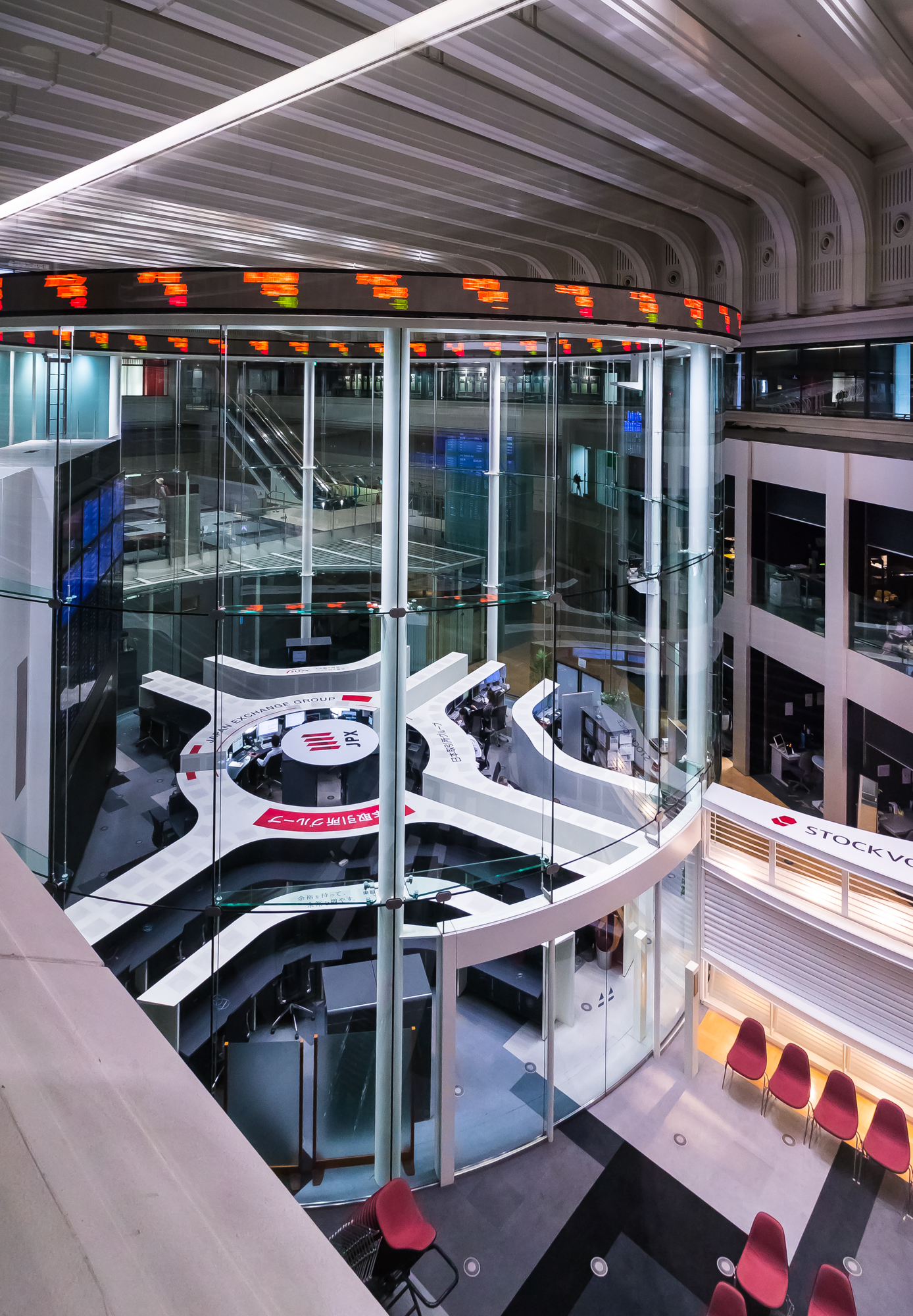
The main trading room of the Tokyo Stock Exchange, one of the largest stock exchanges in the world

The Tokyo Stock Exchange is the third largest stock exchange in the world by market capitalisation, as well as the 2nd largest stock market in Asia, with 2,292 listed companies. The Nikkei 225 and the TOPIX are the two important stock market indexes of the Tokyo Stock Exchange. The Tokyo Stock Exchange and the Osaka Stock Exchange, another major stock exchange in Japan, merged on 1 January 2013, creating one of the world's largest stock exchanges. Other stock exchanges in Japan include the Nagoya Stock Exchange, Fukuoka Stock Exchange and Sapporo Securities Exchange.

==== Housing and real estate ====
Various types of modern housing in Japan

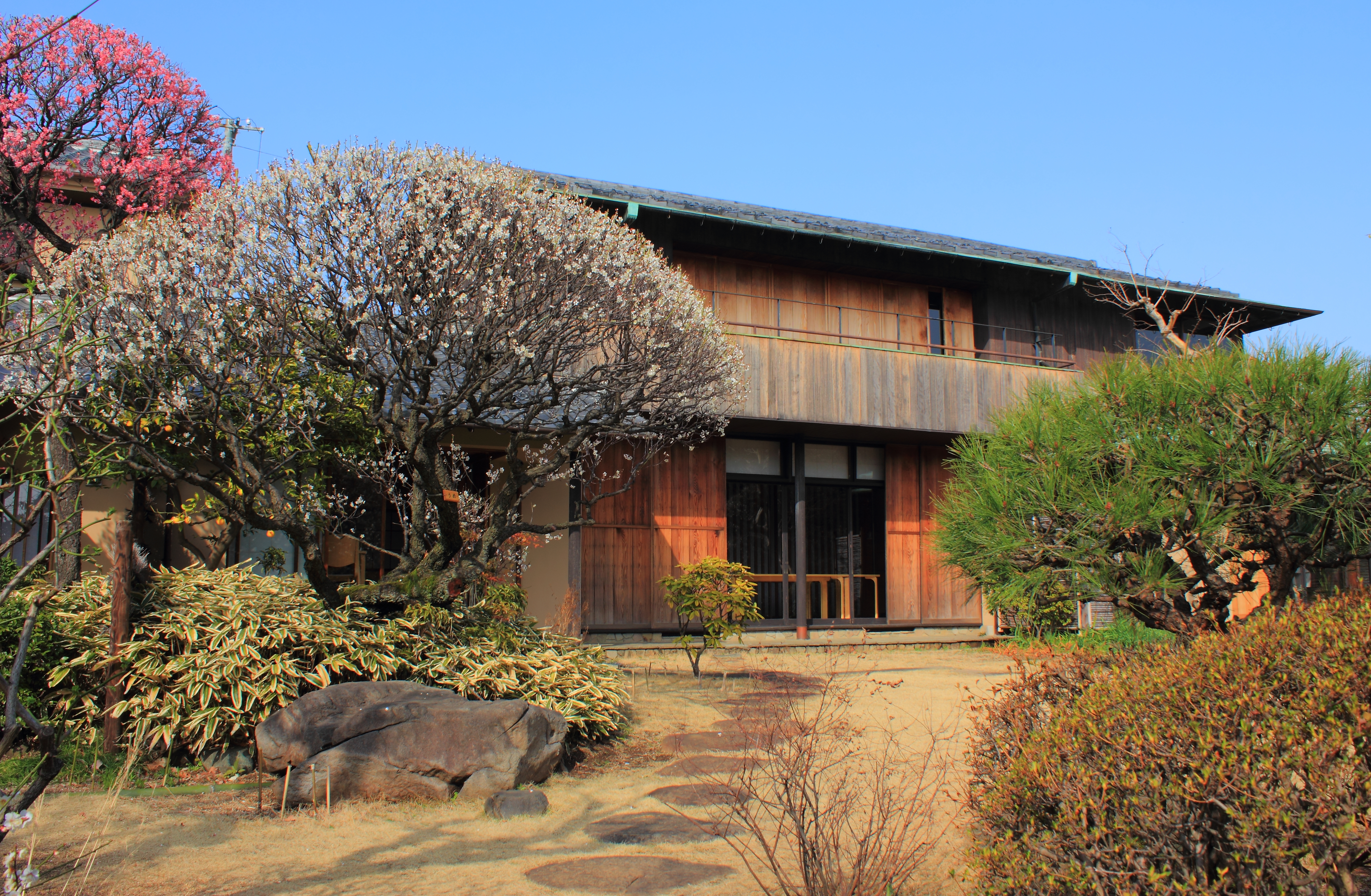
Traditional-style Sukiya-zukuri

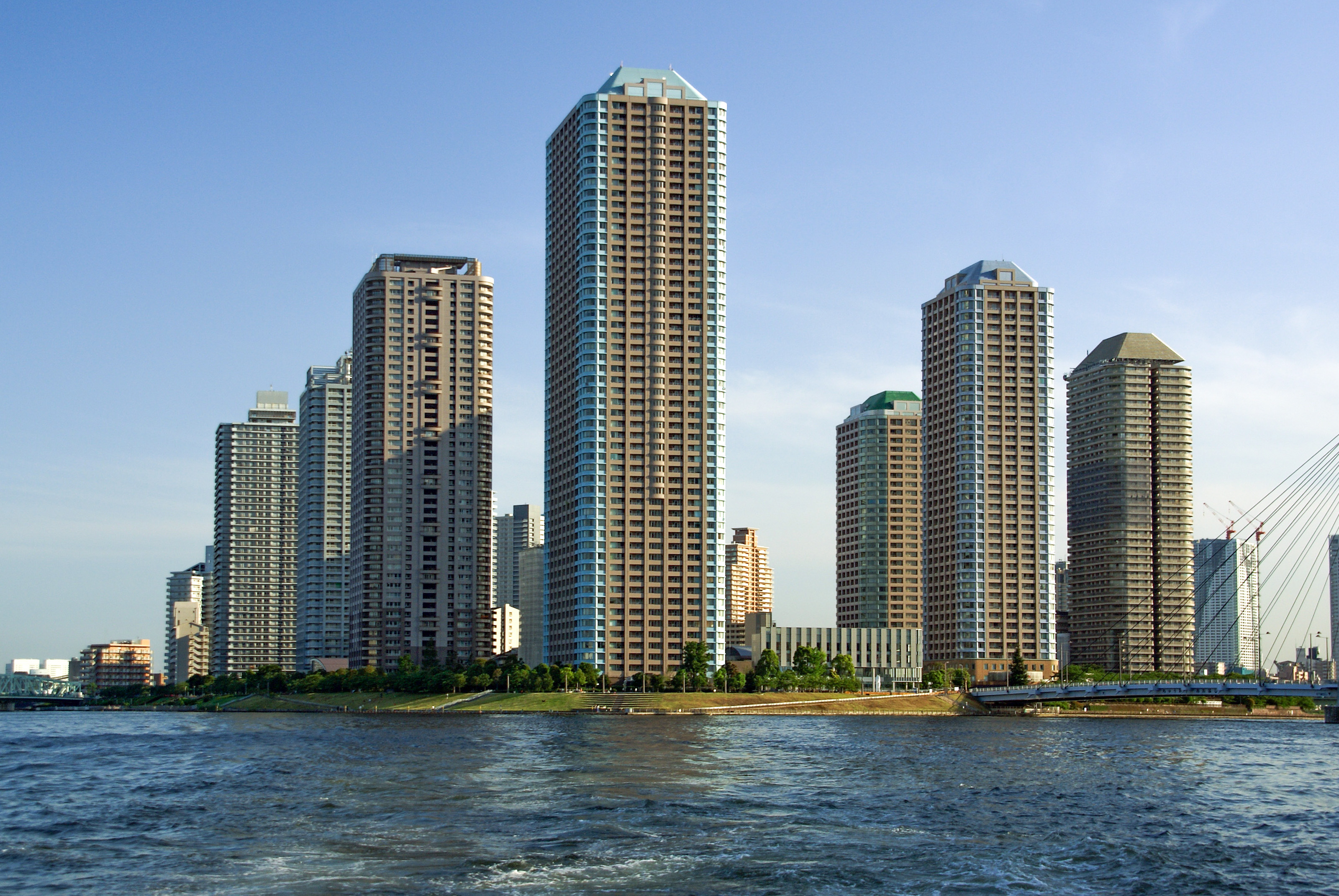
'Tower mansion' upper-middle-class condominiums in Tokyo

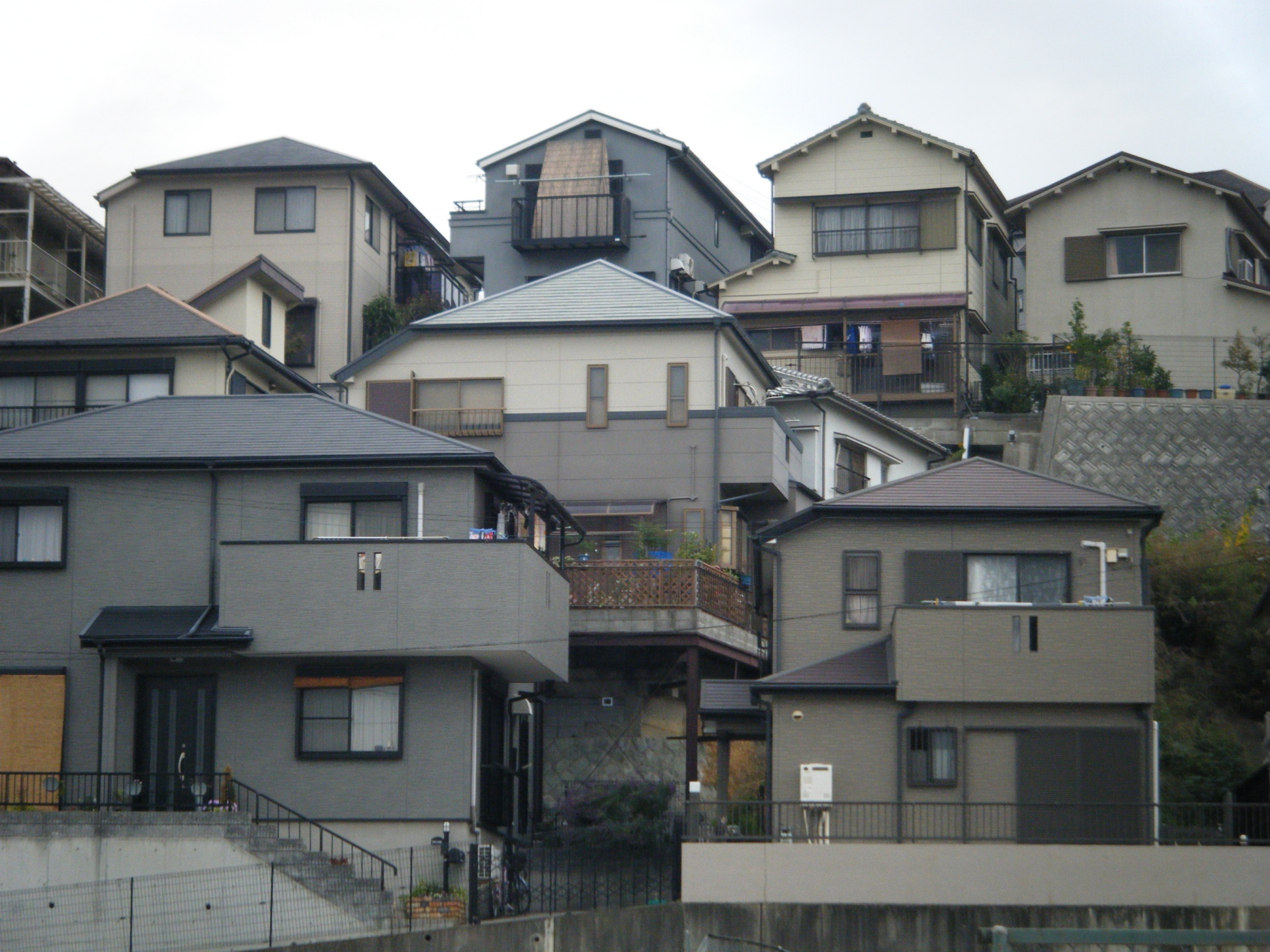
Densely built modern houses in suburban Kobe

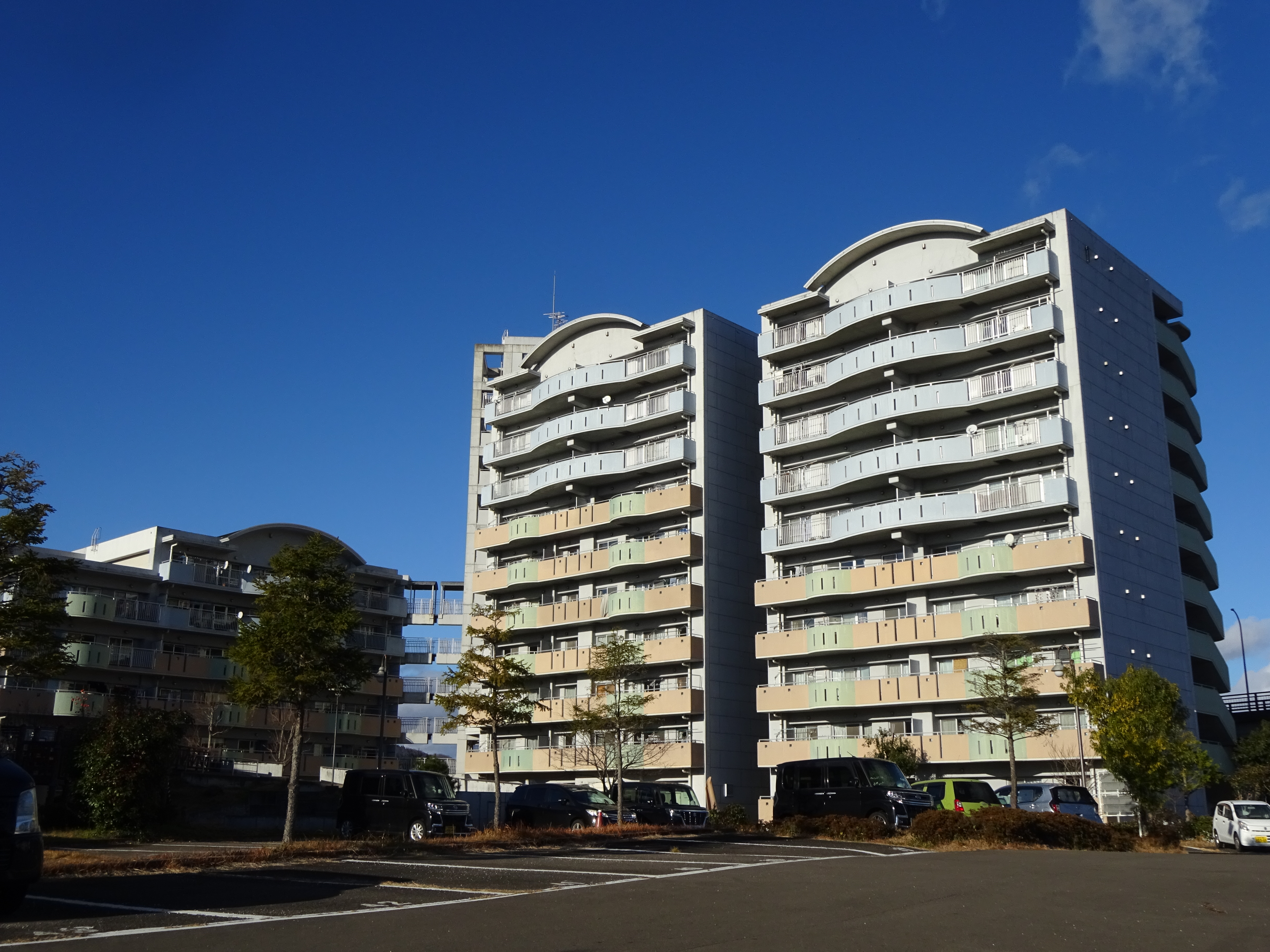
Public housing in Shibata, Miyagi

Housing in Japan includes modern and traditional styles. Two patterns of residences are predominant in contemporary Japan: the single-family detached house and the multiple-unit building, either owned by an individual or corporation and rented as apartments to tenants, or owned by occupants. Additional kinds of housing, especially for unmarried people, include boarding houses (which are popular among college students), dormitories (common in companies), and barracks (for members of the Japan Self-Defense Forces, police and some other public employees).

An unusual feature of Japanese housing is that houses are presumed to have a limited lifespan, and are often torn down and rebuilt after a few decades, generally twenty years for wooden buildings and thirty years for concrete buildings – see regulations for details. Renovating houses, rather than rebuilding them, is a relatively uncommon practice in Japan, though its prevalence is increasing, indicating that attitudes towards the use of older houses may be changing.

Japan is located in a seismically active region, and earthquake resistance is a major consideration in housing. The Building Standards Act sets minimum standards for building safety, and seismic design requirements have been strengthened over time, including a major revision in 1981. Post-disaster surveys after the 1995 Great Hanshin–Awaji Earthquake found that buildings constructed to older seismic standards generally suffered greater damage than those built to the 1981 standards. Many detached houses are wood-frame construction, in which seismic performance depends on factors such as the amount and layout of shear walls and bracing.

==== Education ====
Education in Japan is managed by the Ministry of Education, Culture, Sports, Science and Technology (MEXT) of Japan. Education is compulsory at the elementary and lower secondary levels, for a total of nine years.

The contemporary Japanese education system is a product of historical reforms dating back to the Meiji period, which established modern educational institutions and systems. This early start of modernisation enabled Japan to provide education at all levels in the native language (Japanese), rather than using the languages of powerful countries that could have had a strong influence in the region. Current educational policies focus on promoting lifelong learning, advanced professional education, and internationalising higher education through initiatives such as accepting more international students, as the nation has a rapidly ageing and shrinking population.

Japanese students consistently achieve high rankings compared to other countries in reading, mathematics, and sciences according to OECD evaluations. In the 2018 Programme for International Student Assessment (PISA), Japan ranked eighth globally, with an average score of 520 compared to the OECD average of 488. Despite this relatively high performance, Japan’s spending on education as a percentage of GDP is 4.1%, below the OECD average of 5%. However, the expenditure per student is relatively high. As of 2023, around 65% of Japanese aged 25 to 34 have attained some form of tertiary education, with a significant number holding degrees in science and engineering, fields crucial to Japan’s technology-driven economy. Japanese women surpass men in higher education attainment, with 59% holding university degrees compared to 52% of men. MEXT reports that 80.6% of 18-year-olds pursue higher education, with a majority attending universities.

==== Healthcare ====
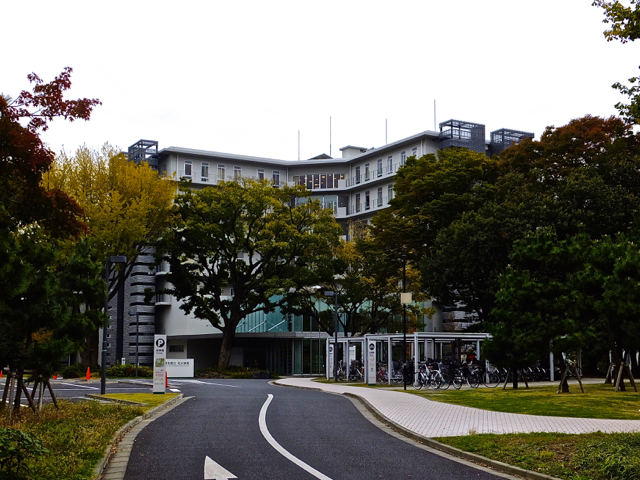
Tokyo Metropolitan Matsuzawa Hospital

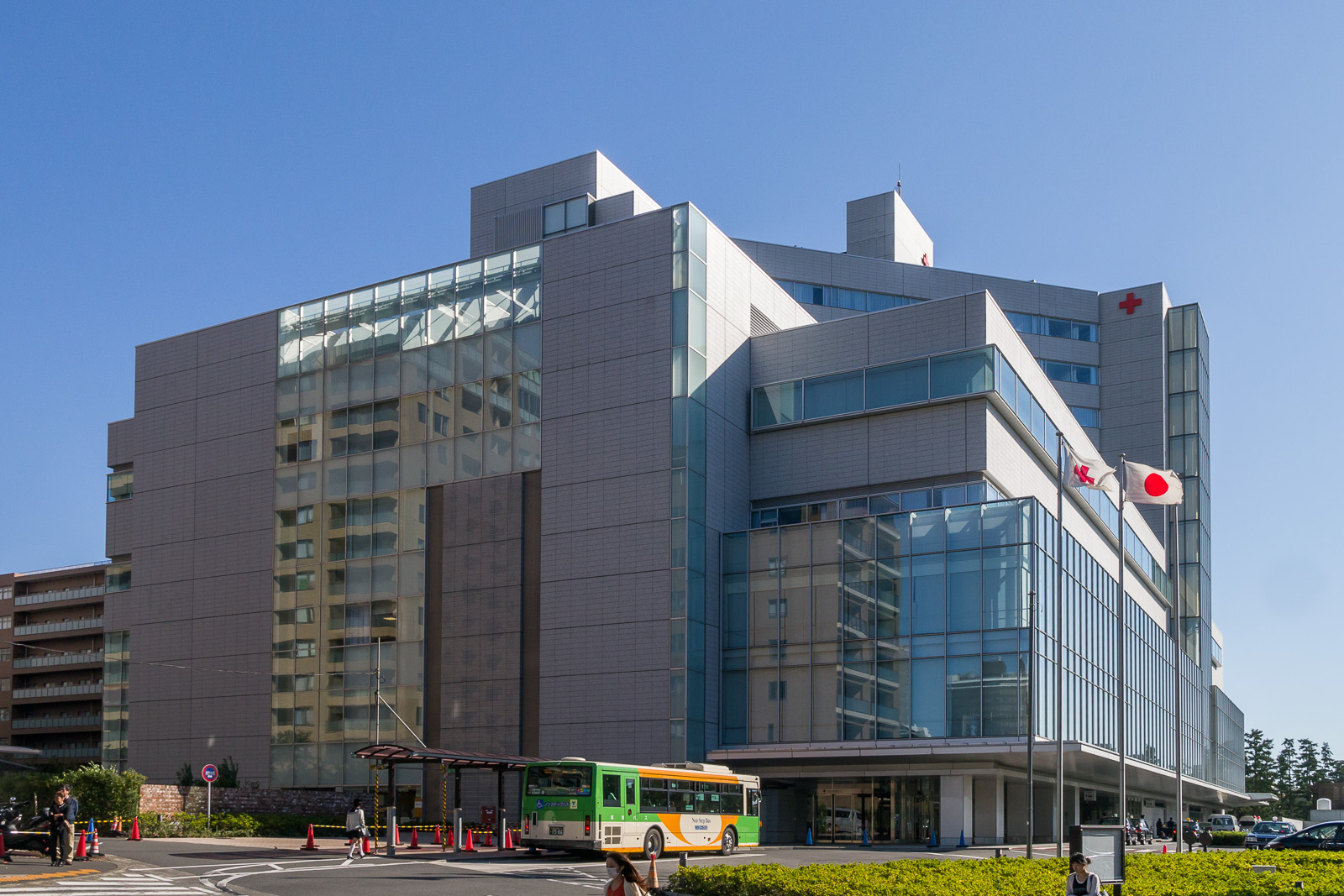
Japanese Red Cross Medical Center in Hiroo, Shibuya

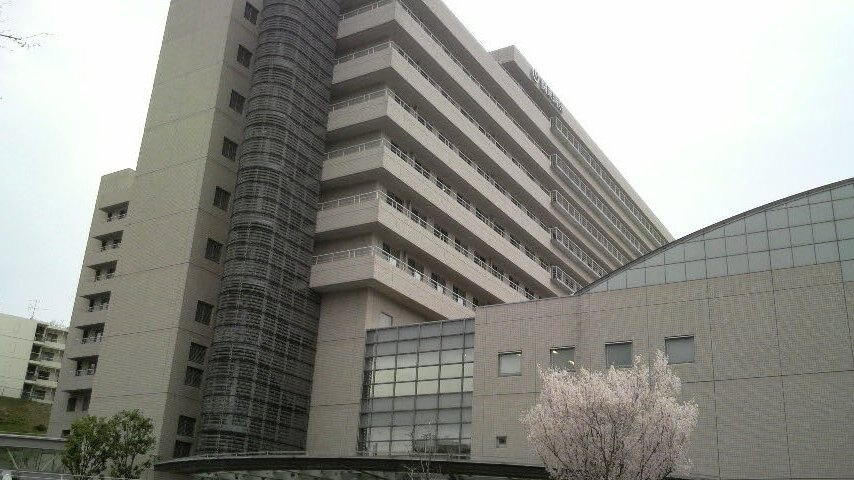
NTT Medical Center in Tokyo

The health care system in Japan provides different types of services, including screening examinations, prenatal care and infectious disease control, with the patient accepting responsibility for 30% of these costs while the government pays the remaining 70%. Payment for personal medical services is offered by a universal health care insurance system that provides relative equality of access, with fees set by a government committee. All residents of Japan are required by the law to have health insurance coverage. People without employer insurance; insurance provided by the employer, where premiums are split between the employer and employee, can participate in a national health insurance program, administered by local governments. Patients are free to select physicians or facilities of their choice and cannot be denied coverage.

Medical fees are strictly regulated by the government to keep them affordable. Depending on the family's income and the age of the insured, patients are responsible for paying 10%, 20%, or 30% of medical fees, with the government paying the remaining fee. Also, monthly thresholds are set for each household, again depending on income and age, and medical fees exceeding the threshold are waived or reimbursed by the government.

Uninsured patients are responsible for paying 100% of their medical fees, but fees are waived for low-income households receiving a government subsidy.

==== Telecommunications and media ====
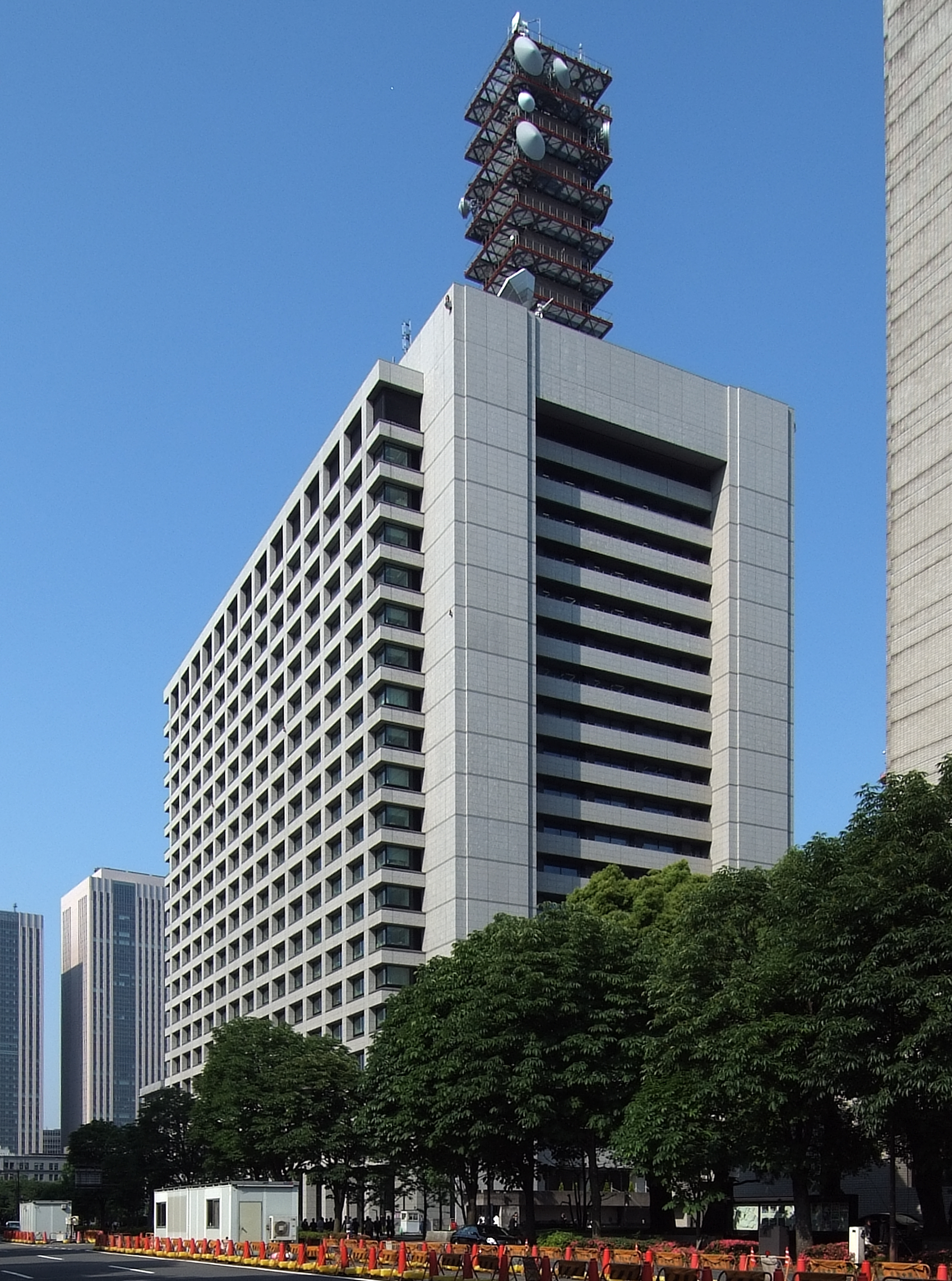
This Tokyo complex houses the Ministry of Internal Affairs and Communications, which administers Japanese cellphone networks while also providing many other services.

Japan has one of the world's most modern communication networks, with strong mobile and internet growth. In 2008, 75 million Japanese consumers (82% of all internet users) used mobile phones to access the Internet. The country's communication infrastructure includes significant telephone and IP services, broadband internet uptake, and major mobile networks run by NTT Docomo, KDDI, SoftBank, and Rakuten Mobile. Founded on early postal innovations and impacted by worldwide technical advances, Japan's communication landscape is constantly modernizing and vital to its social and economic progress.

==== Tourism ====
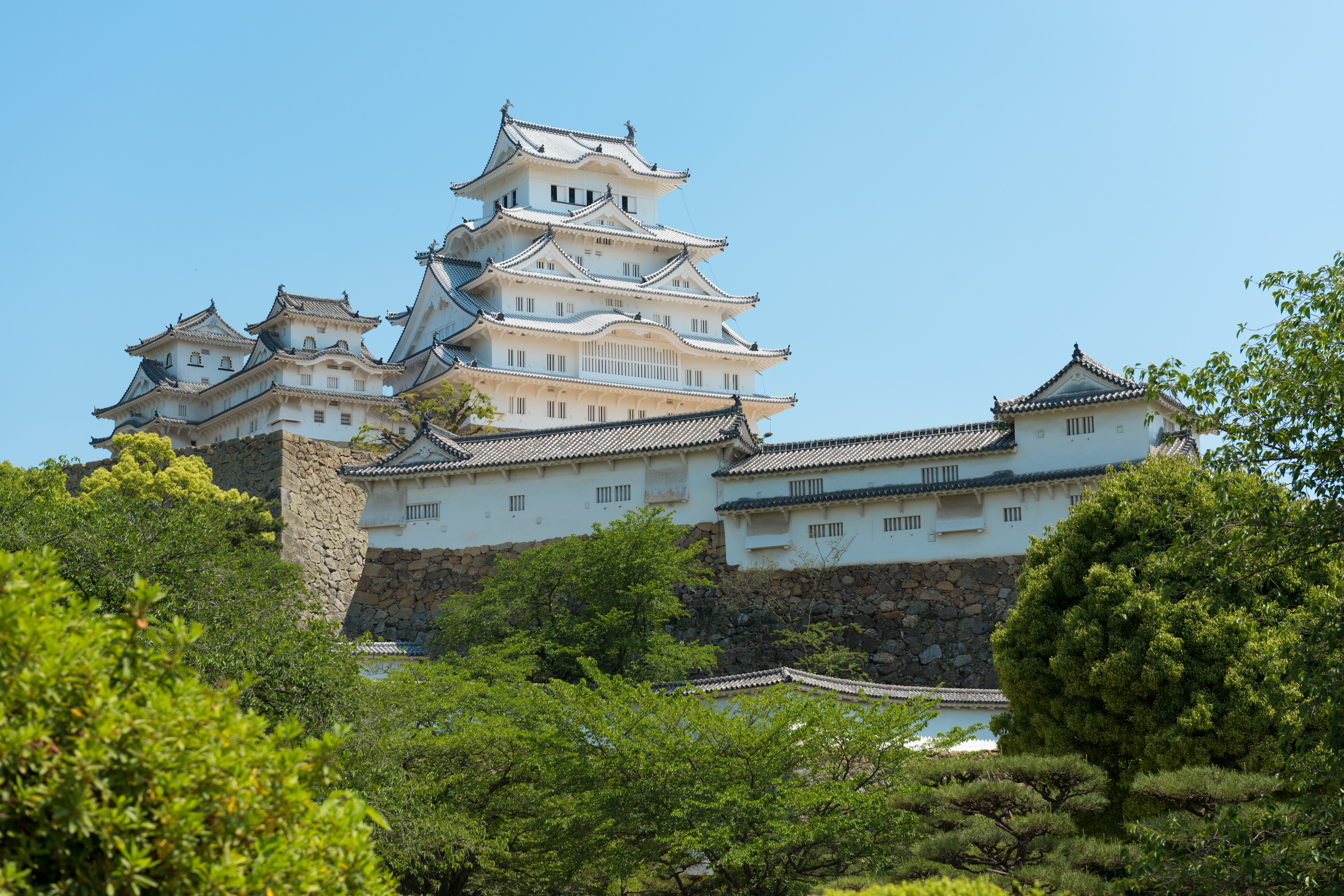
Himeji Castle, in Himeji, Hyōgo Prefecture, is one of the most visited sights in Japan.

In 2012, Japan was the fifth most visited country in Asia and the Pacific, with over 8.3 million tourists. In 2013, due to the weaker yen and easier visa requirements for southwest Asian countries, Japan received a record 11.25 million visitors, which was higher than the government's projected goal of 10 million visitors. The government hopes to attract 40 million visitors a year by the 2020 Summer Olympics in Tokyo. Some of the most popular visited places include the Shinjuku, Ginza, Shibuya and Asakusa areas in Tokyo, and the cities of Osaka, Kobe and Kyoto, as well as Himeji Castle. Hokkaido is also a popular winter destination for visitors with several ski resorts and luxury hotels being built there.

Japan's economy is less dependent on international tourism than those of other G7 countries and OECD countries in general; from 1995 to 2014, it was by far the least visited country in the G7 despite being the second largest country in the group, and as of 2013 was one of the least visited countries in the OECD on a per capita basis. In 2013, international tourist receipts was 0.3% of Japan's GDP, while the corresponding figure was 1.3% for the United States and 2.3% for France.

=== Infrastructure ===
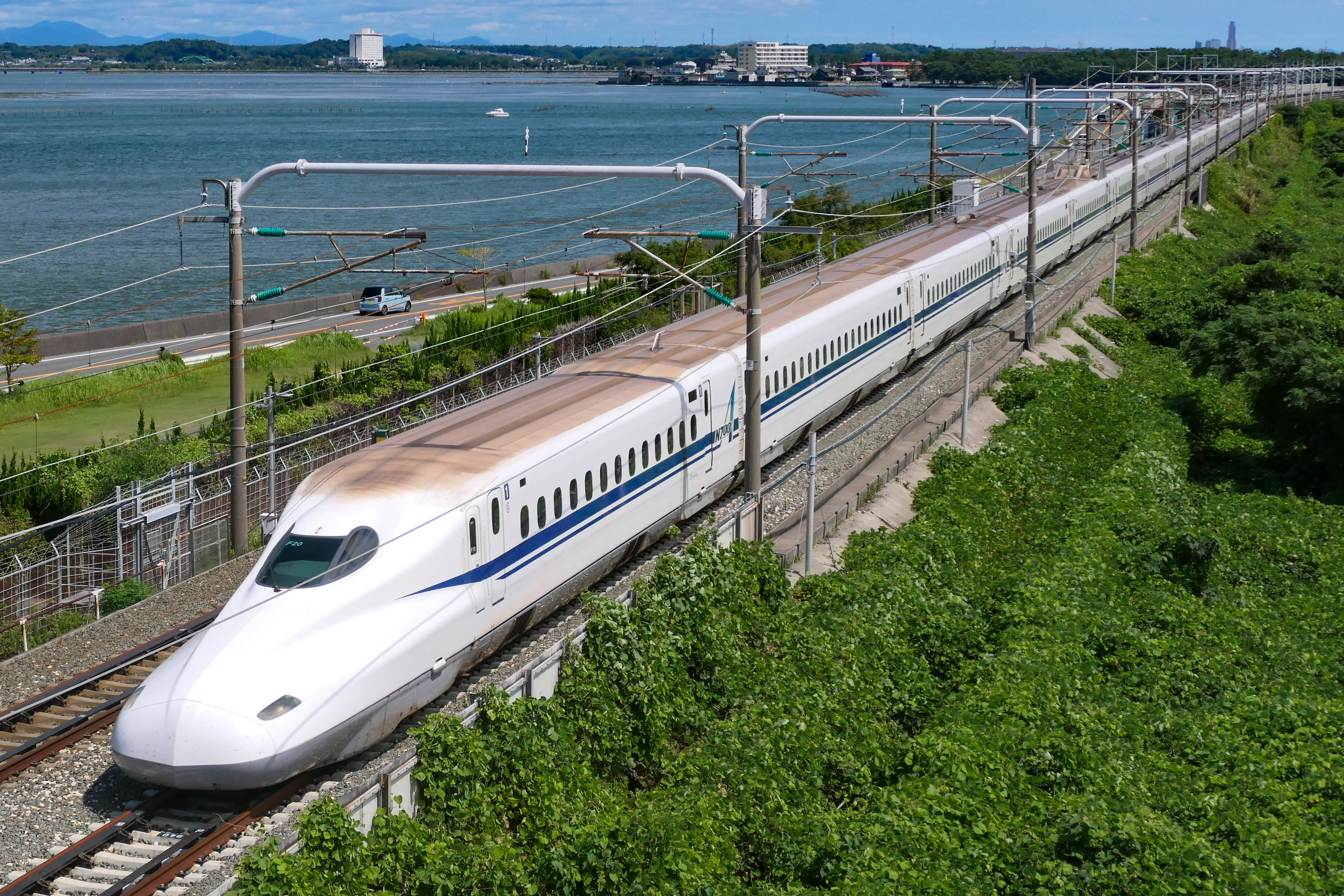
Shinkansen N700 Series

In 2018, Japan ranked 5th overall in the World Bank's Logistics Performance Index, and 2nd in the infrastructure category.

==== Energy ====
In 2005, one half of Japan's energy was produced from petroleum, a fifth from coal, and 14% from natural gas. Nuclear power in Japan made a quarter of electricity production but due to the Fukushima Daiichi nuclear disaster there has been a large desire to end Japan's nuclear power program. In September 2013, Japan closed its last 50 nuclear power plants nationwide, causing the nation to be nuclear free. The country has since then opted to restart a few of its nuclear reactors.

About 84% of Japan's energy is imported from other countries. Japan is the world's largest liquefied natural gas importer, second largest coal importer, and third largest net oil importer. Given its heavy dependence on imported energy, Japan has aimed to diversify its sources. Since the oil shocks of the 1970s, Japan has reduced dependence on petroleum as a source of energy from 77.4% in 1973 to about 43.7% in 2010 and increased dependence on natural gas and nuclear power. In September 2019, Japan will invest 10 billion on liquefied natural gas projects worldwide, in a strategy to boost the global LNG market and reinforce the security of energy supply.

Other important energy source includes coal, and hydroelectricity is Japan's biggest renewable energy source. Japan's solar market is also currently booming. Kerosene is also used extensively for home heating in portable heaters, especially farther north. Many taxi companies run their fleets on liquefied natural gas. A recent success towards greater fuel economy was the introduction of mass-produced hybrid vehicles. Prime Minister Shinzō Abe, who was working on Japan's economic revival, signed a treaty with Saudi Arabia and UAE about the rising prices of oil, ensuring Japan's stable deliveries from that region.

===== Electrical =====
Electricity production in Japan by source.

The electric power industry in Japan covers the generation, transmission, distribution, and sale of electric energy in Japan. Japan's electricity demand was approximately 805.9 terawatt-hours (TWh) in 2024. Before the 2011 Fukushima Daiichi nuclear disaster, about a quarter of electricity in the country was generated by nuclear power. In the following years, most nuclear power plants have been on hold, being replaced mostly by coal and natural gas. Solar power is a growing source of electricity, and Japan has the third largest solar installed capacity with about 50 GW as of 2017. Japan's electricity production is characterized by a diverse energy mix, including nuclear, fossil fuels, renewable energy, and hydroelectric power. Japan has the second largest pumped-hydro storage installed capacity in the world after China.

The electrical grid in Japan is isolated, with no international connections, and consists of four wide area synchronous grids. Unusually, the Eastern and Western grids run at different frequencies (50 and 60 Hz respectively) and are connected by HVDC connections. This considerably limits the amount of electricity that can be transmitted between the north and south of the country.

==== Transport ====
Japan's spendings on roads has been considered large. The 1.2 million kilometers of paved road are one of the major means of transportation. Japan has left-hand traffic. A single network of speed, divided, limited-access toll roads connects major cities and are operated by toll-collecting enterprises. New and used cars are inexpensive, and the Japanese government has encouraged people to buy hybrid vehicles. Car ownership fees and fuel levies are used to promote energy-efficiency.

Rail transport is a major means of transport in Japan. Dozens of Japanese railway companies compete in regional and local passenger transportation markets; for instance, 6 passenger JR enterprises, Kintetsu Railway, Seibu Railway, and Keio Corporation. Often, strategies of these enterprises contain real estate or department stores next to stations, and many major stations have major department stores near them. The Japanese cities of Fukuoka, Kobe, Kyoto, Nagoya, Osaka, Sapporo, Sendai, Tokyo and Yokohama all have subway systems. Some 250 high-speed Shinkansen trains connect major cities. All trains are known for punctuality, and a delay of 90 seconds can be considered late for some train services.

There are 98 passenger and 175 total airports in Japan, and flying is a popular way to travel. The largest domestic airport, Tokyo International Airport, is Asia's second busiest airport. The largest international gateways are Narita International Airport (Tokyo area), Kansai International Airport (Osaka/Kobe/Kyoto area), and Chūbu Centrair International Airport (Nagoya area).

The largest ports in Japan include Nagoya Port, the Port of Yokohama, the Port of Tokyo and the Port of Kobe.

==== Water supply and sanitation ====
Water supply and sanitation in Japan is characterized by numerous achievements and some challenges. The country has achieved universal access to water supply and sanitation, has one of the lowest levels of water distribution losses in the world, regularly exceeds its own strict standards for the quality of drinking water and treated waste water, uses an effective national system of performance benchmarking for water and sanitation utilities, makes extensive use of both advanced and appropriate technologies such as the jōkasō on-site sanitation system, and has pioneered the payment for ecosystem services before the term was even coined internationally. Some of the challenges are a decreasing population, declining investment, fiscal constraints, ageing facilities, an ageing workforce, a fragmentation of service provision among thousands of municipal utilities, and the vulnerability of parts of the country to droughts that are expected to become more frequent due to climate change.

== Science and technology ==
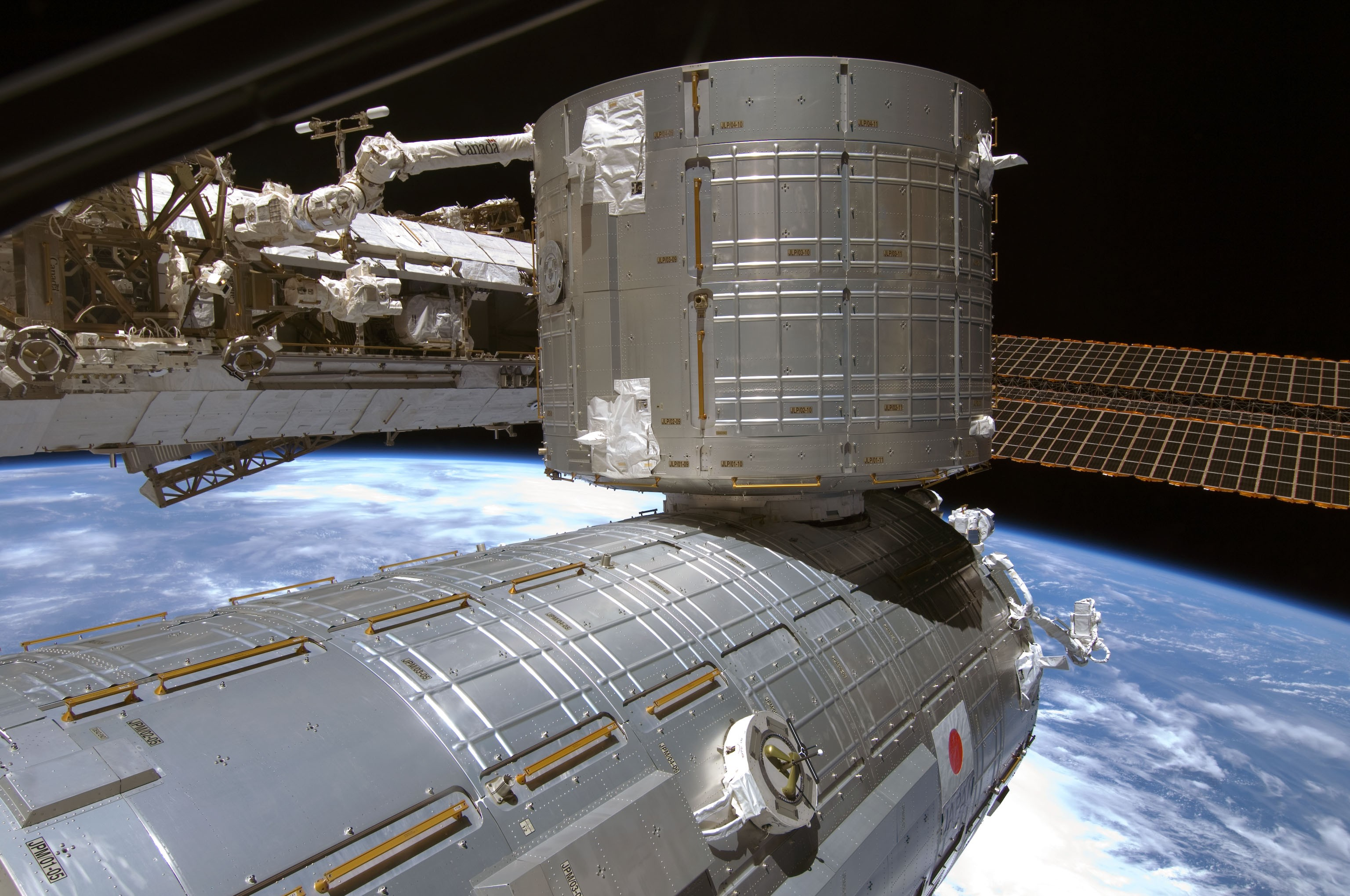
Japanese Experiment Module

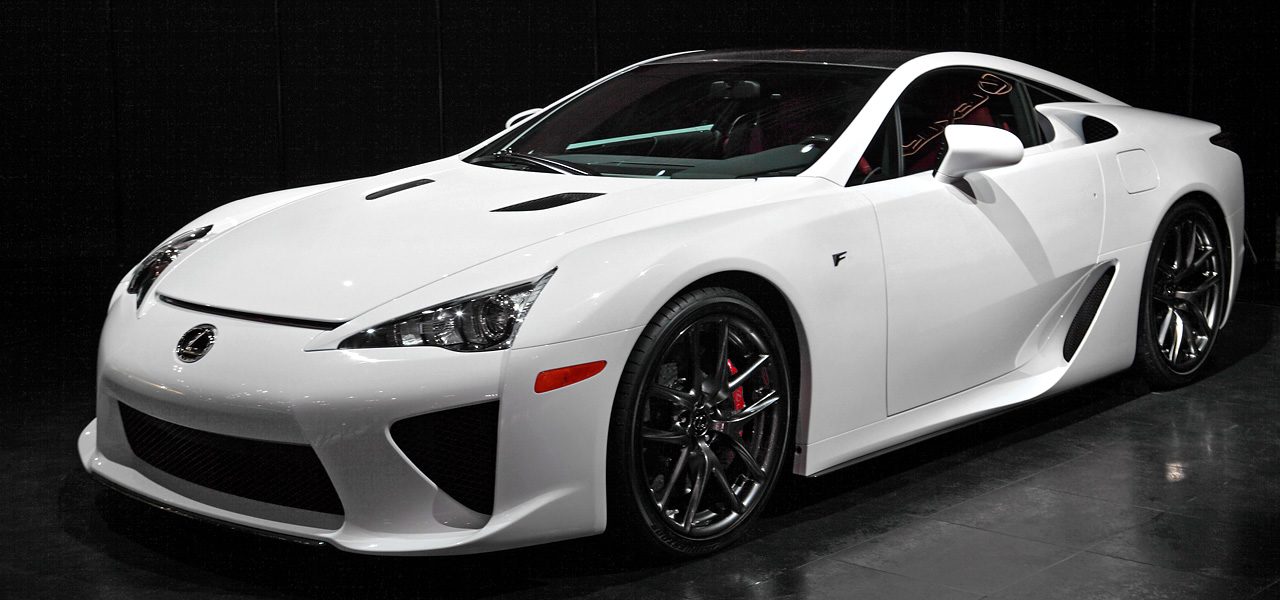
Lexus LFA

Science and technology in Japan has helped fuel the rapid industrial and economic development of the country. Japan has a long history and tradition for research and development, stretching as far back as the Meiji period.

However, science and technology developed rapidly after the Second World War, which has affected the advancement of vehicle technology, consumer electronics, robotics, medical devices, space exploration, and film industry. Japan's educational system as well as its higher education institutions help contribute to the country's acceptance for technological innovation and aid engineering talent development.

High levels of support for research and development have enabled Japan to produce advances in automotive engines, television display technology, video games, optical clocks, and many other fields. Japan is also advanced and a global leader in the robotics, natural sciences, aerospace exploration and biomedical research areas. In 2025, Japan was ranked 12th in the Global Innovation Index by the World Intellectual Property Organization, and remained in the same position in the index of 2026. Scientific research in Japan is supported and promoted by the Japanese Government through various institutes and agencies including the Japan Science and Technology Agency (科学技術振興機構), Science Council of Japan (日本学術会議) and the Japan Academy (日本学士院).

== Trade and investments ==
In its economic relations, Japan is both a major trading nation and one of the largest international investors in the world. In many respects, international trade is the lifeblood of Japan's economy. Imports and exports totaling the equivalent of nearly US$1.309.2 Trillion in 2017, which meant that Japan was the world's fourth largest trading nation after China, the United States and Germany. Trade was once the primary form of Japan's international economic relationships, but in the 1980s its rapidly rising foreign investments added a new and increasingly important dimension, broadening the horizons of Japanese businesses and giving Japan new world prominence.

The following is a list of the 15 largest trading partners of Japan.

These figures do not include services or foreign direct investment, but only trade in goods. The fifteen largest Japanese trading partners with their total trade (sum of imports and exports) in billions of US dollars for calendar year 2021 are as follows:

Rank	Country/District	Exports	Imports	Total trade	Trade balance
–	World	719.1	787.5	1,506.6	−68.4
1	China	126.5	174.2	300.7	−47.8
2	United States	144.2	82.5	226.6	61.7
–	ASEAN	105.1	120.9	226.0	−15.8
–	European Union	74.0	80.7	154.7	−6.7
–	Gulf Cooperation Council	22.0	93.5	115.5	−71.5
3	Australia	16.8	65.3	82.1	−48.5
4	Taiwan	43.0	35.7	78.7	7.3
5	South Korea	47.0	31.1	78.1	16.0
6	Thailand	29.4	25.8	55.2	3.6
7	United Arab Emirates	10.4	37.0	47.4	−26.6
8	Vietnam	17.2	25.9	43.0	−8.7
9	Germany	19.4	22.5	41.9	−3.1
10	Saudi Arabia	6.4	34.8	41.1	−28.4
11	Indonesia	14.5	24.5	38.9	−10.0
12	Malaysia	14.0	20.2	34.2	−6.2
13	Hong Kong	32.6	1.5	34.1	31.0
14	Singapore	18.9	8.6	27.5	10.2
15	Canada	10.9	14.5	25.5	−3.6

Japan is also the dominant export partner of the following:

Exports
Region	Percentage
Palau	77.2%
Kiribati	31.8%
Brunei	25.6%

Exports of Japan by product category (2019) Chemical products Transportation Machines Mineral products Plastics and rubbers Metals Foodstuffs Precious metals Textiles Instruments Animal products Vegetable products Paper goods Footwear and headwear Miscellaneous Stone and glass Wood products Animal and vegetable bi-products Animal hides Arts and antiques Weapons

The following is a list of the exports of Japan. Data is for 2016–2020, in millions of United States dollars, as reported by The Observatory of Economic Complexity. Currently the exports contributing at least 0.67% to total export in any year are listed.

Product	Value (2012)	Value (2020)
Metal	104,286	105,000
Vehicle Parts	42,212	37,600
Integrated circuits	19,192	33,000
Industrial printers	17,465	13,400
Machinery Having Individual Functions	13,577	12,900
Large Construction Vehicles	13,249	9,770
Trucks	12,243	11,100
Refined Petroleum	11,451	7,920
Video Recording Equipment	11,207	4,600
Low-voltage Protection Equipment	10,141	10,500
Hot-Rolled Iron	10,094	6,840
Engine Parts	9,293	6,970
Rubber tyres	8,828	5,650
LCDs	8,241	6,720
Semiconductor devices	8,146	12,400
Photo Lab Equipment	8,021	5,630
Raw Plastic Sheeting	7,608	5,480
Cyclic Hydrocarbons	7,320	3,930
Air pumps	6,602	5,860
Transmissions	6,540	6,870
Optical fibers	6,534	4,000
Computers	6,230	5,110
Broadcasting accessories	6,170	4,740
Gold	6,140	10,050
Medical instruments	5,980	7,040
Metalworking transfer machines	5,900	3,040
Spark-ignition engines	5,850	6,090
Ball bearings	5,810	4,550
Combustion engines	5,800	4,090
Electrical capacitors	5,610	6,630
Valves	5,520	5,160
Telephones	5,390	8,130
Thermostats	4,440	5,530
Chemical analysis instruments	4,390	6,430
Aircraft parts	4,290	5,400
Electric batteries	3,410	5,380
Passenger and cargo ships	949	13,300
not specified	0	37,200

== Labour force ==
Unemployment rate of Japan. Red line is G7 average. 15-24 age (thin line) is youth unemployment.

The unemployment rate in December 2013 was 3.7%, down 1.5 percentage points from the claimed unemployment rate of 5.2% in June 2009 due to the strong economic recovery. As of 2019 Japan's unemployment rate was the lowest in the G7. Its employment rate for the working-age population (15–64) was the highest in the G7.

In 2008 Japan's labour force consisted of some 66 million workers—40% of whom were women—and was rapidly shrinking. One major long-term concern for the Japanese labour force is its low birthrate. In 2005, the number of deaths in Japan exceeded the number of births, indicating that the decline in population had already started. While one countermeasure for a declining birthrate would be to increase immigration, Japan has struggled to attract potential migrants despite immigration laws being relatively lenient (especially for high-skilled workers) compared to other developed countries. This is also apparent when looking at Japan's work visa programme for "specified skilled worker", which had less than 3,000 applicants, despite an annual goal of attracting 40,000 overseas workers, suggesting Japan faces major challenges in attracting migrants compared to other developed countries regardless of its immigration policies. A Gallup poll found that few potential migrants wished to migrate to Japan compared to other G7 countries, consistent with the country's low migrant inflow.

In 1989, the predominantly public sector union confederation, SOHYO (General Council of Trade Unions of Japan), merged with RENGO (Japanese Private Sector Trade Union Confederation) to form the Japanese Trade Union Confederation. Labour union membership is about 12 million.

== Law and government ==
Japan ranks 27th of 185 countries in the ease of doing business index 2013.

Japan has one of the smallest tax rates in the developed world. After deductions, the majority of workers are free from personal income taxes. Consumption tax rate is 10%, while corporate tax rates are high, second highest corporate tax rate in the world, at 36.8%. However, the House of Representatives has passed a bill which increased the consumption tax to 10% in October 2015. The government has also decided to reduce corporate tax and to phase out automobile tax.

In 2016, the International Monetary Fund encouraged Japan to adopt an income policy that pushes firms to raise employee wages in combination with reforms to tackle the labor market dual tiered employment system to drive higher wages, on top of monetary and fiscal stimulus. Shinzo Abe has encouraged firms to raise wages by at least three per cent annually (the inflation target plus average productivity growth).

Shareholder activism is rare despite the fact that the corporate law gives shareholders strong powers over managers. Under Prime Minister Shinzō Abe, corporate governance reform has been a key initiative to encourage economic growth. In 2012, only around 40% of leading Japanese companies had any independent directors; by 2016, the majority had begun to appoint independent directors.

The government's liabilities include the second largest public debt of any nation with debt of over one quadrillion yen, or 8,535,340,000,000 in USD. Former Prime Minister Naoto Kan has called the situation 'urgent'.

Japan's central bank has the second largest foreign-exchange reserves after China, with over one trillion US Dollars in foreign reserves.

=== Welfare ===
Social welfare, assistance for the ill or otherwise disabled and the old, has long been provided in Japan by both the government and private companies. Beginning in the 1920s, the Japanese government enacted a series of welfare programs, based mainly on European models, to provide medical care and financial support. During the post-war period, a comprehensive system of social security was gradually established. Universal health insurance and a pension system were established in 1960.

The futures of health and welfare systems in Japan are being shaped by the rapid aging of the population. The mixture of public and private funding has created complex pension and insurance systems, meshing with Japanese traditional calls for support within the family and by the local community for welfare recipients.

== Culture ==
Our expansion could be much bigger and quicker, but we are held back. Nowhere in the world do the [regulatory approvals] take so long. (The process is) old fashioned. — Tony Fernandes, AirAsia chief.

=== Overview ===
Nemawashi (根回し), 'consensus building', in Japanese culture is an informal process of quietly betting the foundation for some proposed change or project, by talking to the people concerned, gathering support and feedback, and so forth. It is considered an important element in any major change, before any formal steps are taken, and successful nemawashi enables changes to be carried out with the consent of all sides.

Japanese companies are known for management methods such as "The Toyota Way". Kaizen (改善, Japanese for 'improvement') is a Japanese philosophy that focuses on continuous improvement throughout all aspects of life. When applied to the workplace, kaizen activities continually improve all functions of a business, from manufacturing to management and from the CEO to the assembly line workers. By improving standardised activities and processes, Kaizen aims to eliminate waste (see Lean manufacturing). Kaizen was first implemented in several Japanese businesses during the country's recovery after World War II, including Toyota, and has since spread to businesses throughout the world. The corporate application of the kaizen system has been criticised for neglecting or harming the quality of life of workers, particularly via the implementation of long working hours. However, according to the OECD, Japan's average for annual hours worked per employee is lower than the OECD average and middling among G7 countries.

Some companies have powerful enterprise unions and shuntō. The nenko system or nenko joretsu as it is called in Japan, is the Japanese system of preferring to promote employees close to retirement. This is done to prioritise experience in executive positions and to allow older employees to achieve a higher salary level before retirement. The nenko system has been criticised for leaving younger employees at a disadvantage against older employees who may be less capable.

Relationships between government bureaucrats and companies are often close. Amakudari (天下り, amakudari; 'descent from heaven') is the institutionalised practice where Japanese senior bureaucrats retire to high-profile positions in the private and public sectors. The practice is increasingly viewed as corrupt and a limitation on efforts to reduce ties between the private sector and the state that prevent economic and political reforms. Lifetime employment (shūshin koyō) and seniority-based career advancement have been common in the Japanese work environment. These practices have become less common in recent years.

Salaryman (サラリーマン, Sararīman; salaried man) refers to someone whose income is salary-based; particularly those working for corporations. Coined in Japan, the word's frequent use by Japanese corporations and its prevalence in Japanese manga and anime has led to its adoption into and common usage within the English language to refer to Japanese white-collar workers, and it can be found in many English-language books and articles pertaining to Japanese culture. Immediately following World War II, becoming a salaryman was viewed as a gateway to a stable, middle-class lifestyle. In modern use, the term carries associations of long working hours, low prestige in the corporate hierarchy, absence of significant sources of income other than salary, wage slavery, and karōshi. The term salaryman refers almost exclusively to males.

An office lady, often abbreviated OL (Japanese: オーエル Ōeru), is a female office worker in Japan who performs generally pink collar tasks such as serving tea and doing secretarial or clerical work. Like many unmarried Japanese, OLs often live with their parents well into early adulthood. Office ladies are usually full-time permanent staff, with little opportunity for promotion, and there is often a tacit expectation that they leave their jobs if they get married.

Freeter (フリーター, furītā) is a Japanese expression for people between the age of 15 and 34 who lack full-time employment or are unemployed, excluding homemakers and students. They may also be described as underemployed or freelance workers. These people do not start a career after high school or university but instead usually live as parasite singles with their parents and earn some money with low skilled and low paid jobs. Low income makes it difficult for freeters to start a family, and lacking qualifications in the form of skilled labor experience makes it difficult for them to start a career at a later point in life.

Karōshi (過労死, karōshi), which can be translated quite literally from Japanese as "death from overwork", is occupational sudden death. The major medical causes of karōshi deaths are heart attack and stroke due to stress.

Sōkaiya (総会屋, sōkaiya), (sometimes also translated as 'corporate bouncers', 'meeting-men', or 'corporate blackmailers') are a form of specialised racketeer unique to Japan, and often associated with the yakuza, who extort money from or blackmail companies by threatening to publicly humiliate companies and their management, usually in their annual meeting (総会, sōkai). Sarakin (サラ金) is a Japanese term for 'moneylender' or 'loan shark'. It is a contraction of the Japanese words for 'salaryman' and 'cash'. Around 14 million people, or 10% of the Japanese population, have borrowed from a sarakin. In total, there are about 10,000 firms (down from 30,000 a decade ago); however, the top seven firms make up 70% of the market. The value of outstanding loans totals 100 billion. The biggest sarakin are publicly traded and often allied with big banks.

The first "Western-style" department store in Japan (called デパート, depāto) was Mitsukoshi, founded in 1904, which has its root as a kimono store called Echigoya from 1673. When the roots are considered, however, Matsuzakaya has an even longer history, dating back to 1611 and becoming a department store in 1910. In 1924, Matsuzakaya store in Ginza allowed street shoes to be worn indoors, something innovative at the time. These former kimono shop department stores dominated the market in its earlier history. They sold luxurious products which contributed to them having sophisticated atmospheres. From the 1920s, private railway operators started to build department stores directly linked to their lines' terminuses. Seibu and Hankyu are examples of this practice. From the 1980s onwards, Japanese department stores have faced fierce competition from supermarkets and convenience stores, and they have gradually declined in prominence. Still, depāto are seen as bastions of cultural conservatism in the country. Gift certificates for department stores are frequently given as presents in Japan. Department stores in Japan generally offer a wide range of services which can include foreign exchange, travel reservations, and ticket sales for local concerts and other events.

== Keiretsu and Zaibatsu ==
A keiretsu (系列; 'system' or 'series') is a set of companies with interlocking business relationships and shareholdings. It is a type of business group. The prototypical keiretsu appeared in Japan during the "economic miracle" following World War II. Before Japan's surrender, Japanese industry was controlled by large family-controlled vertical monopolies called zaibatsu. The Allies dismantled the zaibatsu in the late 1940s, but the companies formed from the dismantling of the zaibatsu were reintegrated. The dispersed corporations were re-interlinked through share purchases to form horizontally integrated alliances across many industries. Where possible, keiretsu companies would also supply one another, making the alliances vertically integrated as well. In this period, official government policy promoted the creation of robust trade corporations that could withstand pressures from intensified world trade competition.

The major keiretsu were each centered on one bank, which lent money to the keiretsu's member companies and held equity positions in the companies. Each central bank had great control over the companies in the keiretsu and acted as a monitoring entity and as an emergency bail-out entity. One effect of this structure was to minimise the presence of hostile takeovers in Japan, because no entities could challenge the power of the banks.

There are two types of keiretsu: vertical and horizontal. Vertical keiretsu illustrates the organisation and relationships within a company (for example all factors of production of a certain product are connected), while a horizontal keiretsu shows relationships between entities and industries, normally centered on a bank and trading company. Both are complexly woven together and sustain each other.

The Japanese recession in the 1990s had profound effects on the keiretsu. Many of the largest banks were hit hard by bad loan portfolios and forced to merge or go out of business. This had the effect of blurring the lines between the keiretsu: Sumitomo Bank and Mitsui Bank, for instance, became Sumitomo Mitsui Banking Corporation in 2001, while Sanwa Bank (the banker for the Hankyu-Toho Group) became part of Bank of Tokyo-Mitsubishi UFJ, now known as MUFG Bank. Additionally, many companies from outside the keiretsu system, such as Sony, began outperforming their counterparts within the system.

Generally, these causes gave rise to a strong notion in the business community that the old keiretsu system was not an effective business model, and led to an overall loosening of keiretsu alliances. While the keiretsu still exist, they are not as centralised or integrated as they were before the 1990s. This, in turn, has led to a growing corporate acquisition industry in Japan, as companies are no longer able to be easily "bailed out" by their banks, as well as rising derivative litigation by more independent shareholders.

== Other economic indicators ==
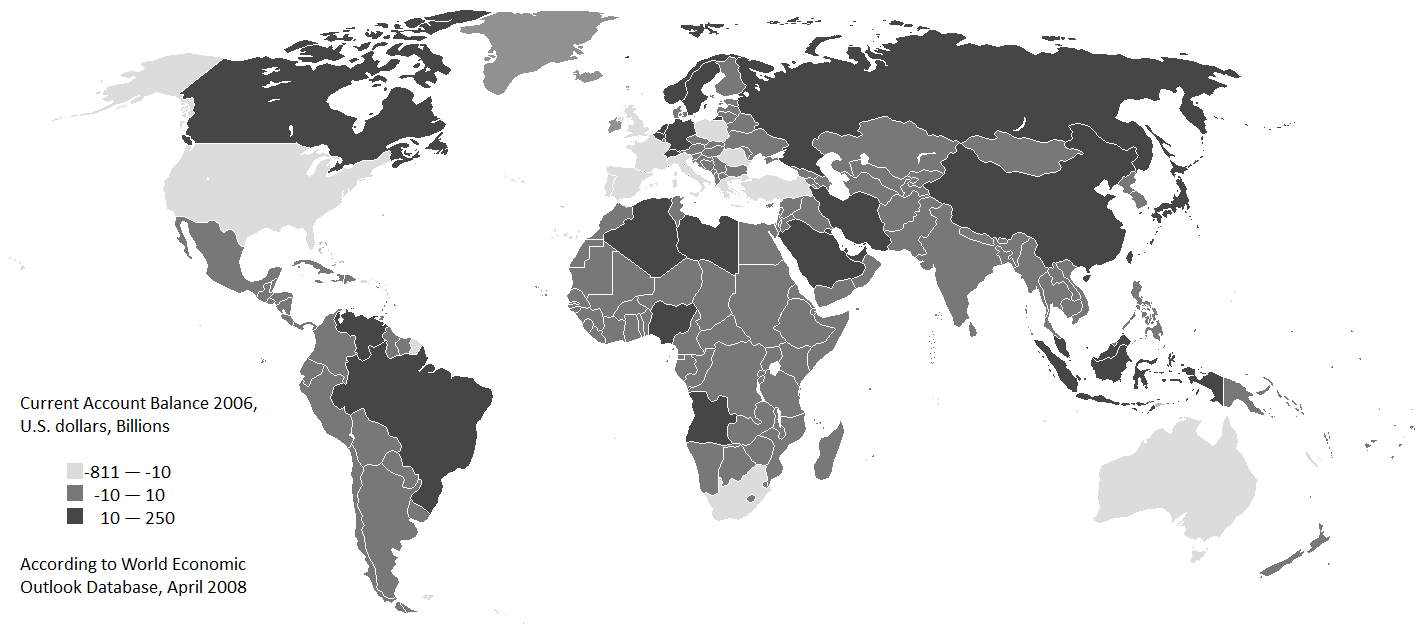
Current account balance (2006)

Net international investment position: 266,223 / billion (1st)

Industrial production growth rate: 3.4% (August 2026)

Investment (gross fixed): 20.3% of GDP (2010 est.)

Household income or consumption by percentage share:

- Lowest 10%: 4.8%
- Highest 10%: 21.7% (1993)

Agriculture products: rice, sugar beets, vegetables, fruit, pork, poultry, dairy products, eggs, fish

Export commodities: machinery and equipment, motor vehicles, semiconductors, chemicals

Import commodities: machinery and equipment, fuels, foodstuffs, chemicals, textiles, raw materials (2001)

Exchange rates:
Japanese Yen per US$1 – 88.67 (2010), 93.57 (2009), 103.58 (2008), 117.99 (2007), 116.18 (2006), 109.69 (2005), 115.93 (2003), 125.39 (2002), 121.53 (2001), 105.16 (January 2000), 113.91 (1999), 130.91 (1998), 120.99 (1997), 108.78 (1996), 94.06 (1995)

Electricity:

- Electricity – consumption: 925.5 billion kWh (2008)
- Electricity – production: 957.9 billion kWh (2008 est.)
- Electricity – exports: 0 kWh (2008)
- Electricity – imports: 0 kWh (2008)

Electricity production by source:

- Fossil Fuel: 69.7%
- Hydro: 7.3%
- Nuclear: 22.5%
- Other: 0.5% (2008)

Electricity standards:

- 100 volts at 50 Hz from the Ōi River (in Shizuoka) Northward;
- 100 volts at 60 Hz Southward

Oil:

- production: 132,700 bbl/d (21,100 m^{3}/d) (2009) (46th)
- consumption: 4,363,000 bbl/d (693,700 m^{3}/d) (2009) (3rd)
- exports: 380,900 barrels per day (60,560 m^{3}/d) (2008) (64th)
- imports: 5,033,000 barrels per day (800,200 m^{3}/d) (2008) (2nd)
- net imports: 4,620,000 barrels per day (735,000 m^{3}/d) (2008 est.)
- proved reserves: 44,120,000 bbl (7,015,000 m^{3}) (1 January 2010 est.)

== See also ==
- Economy of Tokyo
- List of Japanese companies
- List of largest Japanese companies
- List of Japanese people by net worth
- List of Japanese prefectures by GDP
- List of Japanese prefectures by GDP per capita
- Bank of Japan
- Corruption in Japan
- Japan Bank for International Cooperation
- Japan External Trade Organization
- Japanese domestic market
- Japan and the International Monetary Fund
- Japan and the World Bank
- Japanese post-war economic miracle
- Japanese asset price bubble
- Machine orders, an economic indicator specific to the Japanese economy
- Ministry of Economy, Trade and Industry
- Ministry of Finance (Japan)
- Poverty in Japan
- Private enterprise in Japan
- Quantitative easing
- Sarakin
- Shinise
- Standard of living in Japan
- Tokugawa coinage
- Economy of East Asia
- Economy of Asia
