= Marriage in Japan =

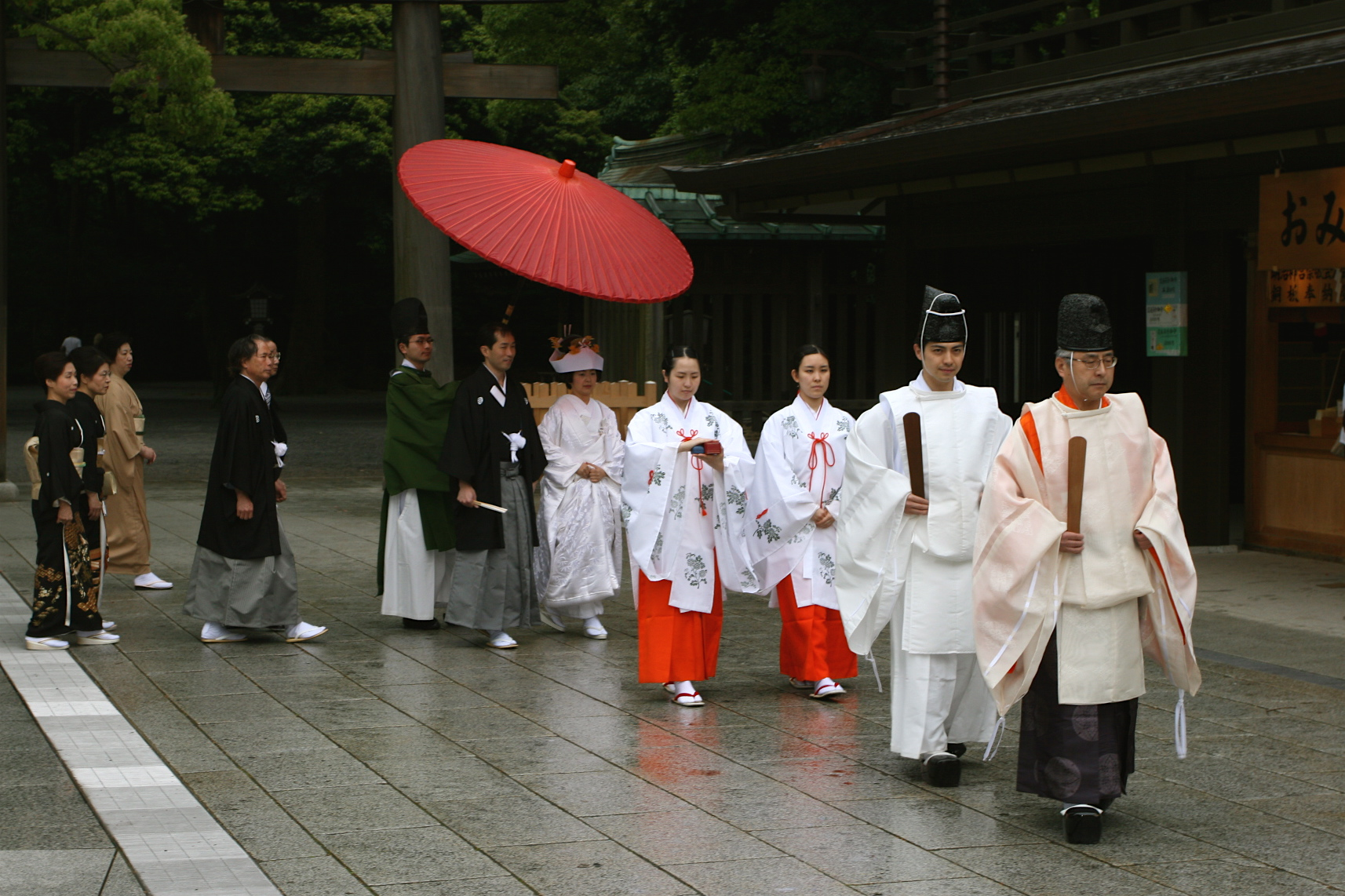
Wedding Procession

Marriage in Japan is a legal and social institution at the center of the household (ie). Couples are legally married once they have made the change in status on their family registration sheets, without the need for a ceremony. Most weddings are held either according to Shinto traditions or in chapels according to Christian marriage traditions.

Traditionally, marriages in Japan were categorized into two types according to the method of finding a partner—omiai, meaning arranged or resulting from an arranged introduction, and ren'ai, in which the husband and wife met and decided to marry on their own—although the distinction has grown less meaningful over postwar decades as Western ideas of love have altered Japanese perceptions of marriage.

== History ==
The institution of marriage in Japan has changed radically over the last millennium. Indigenous practices adapted first to Chinese Confucianism during the medieval era, and then to Western concepts of individualism, gender equality, romantic love, and the nuclear family during the modern era. Customs once exclusive to a small aristocracy gained mass popularity as the population became increasingly urbanized.

=== Heian period (794–1185) ===
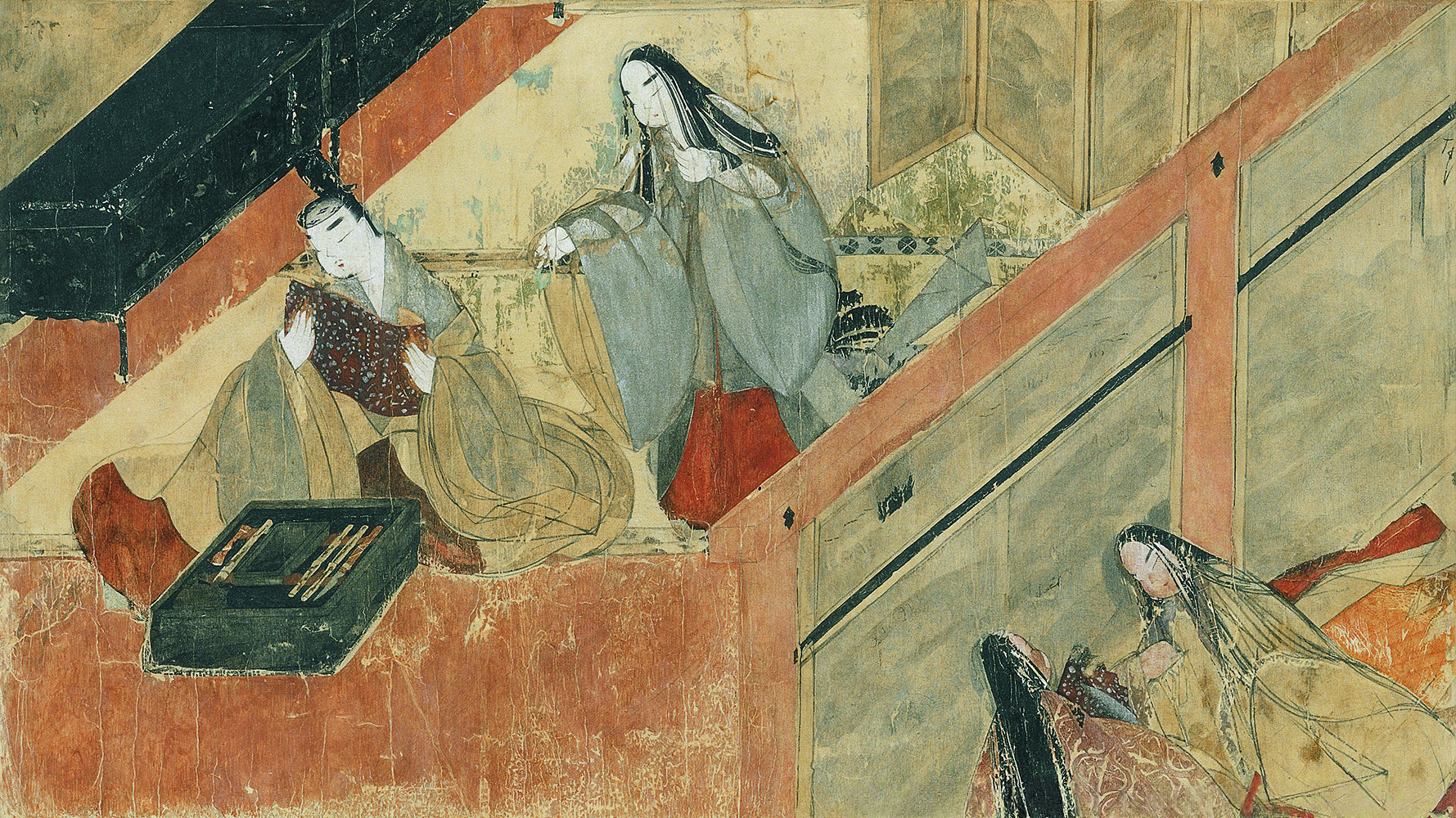
Genji's son Yūgiri (夕霧; "Evening Mist") reads a letter. Genji Monogatari Emaki, 12th century handscroll, Gotoh Museum.

The Heian period of Japanese history marked the culmination of its classical era, when the vast imperial court established itself and its culture in Heian-kyō (modern Kyoto). Heian society was organized by an elaborate system of rank, and the purpose of marriage was to produce children who would inherit the highest possible rank from the best-placed lineage. It was neither ceremonial nor necessarily permanent.

Aristocrats exchanged letters and poetry for a period of months or years before arranging to meet after dark. If a man saw the same woman for a period of three nights, they were considered married, and the wife's parents held a banquet for the couple. Most members of the lower-class engaged in a permanent marriage with one partner, and husbands arranged to bring their wives into their own household, in order to ensure the legitimacy of their offspring.

High-ranked noblemen sometimes kept multiple wives or concubines. Aristocratic wives could remain in their fathers' house, and the husband would recognize paternity with the formal presentation of a gift. The forms of Heian courtship, as well as the pitfalls of amorous intrigue, are well represented in the literature of the period, especially The Tale of the Bamboo Cutter, The Sarashina Diary, The Pillow Book, and The Tale of Genji.

=== Edo period (1600–1868) ===
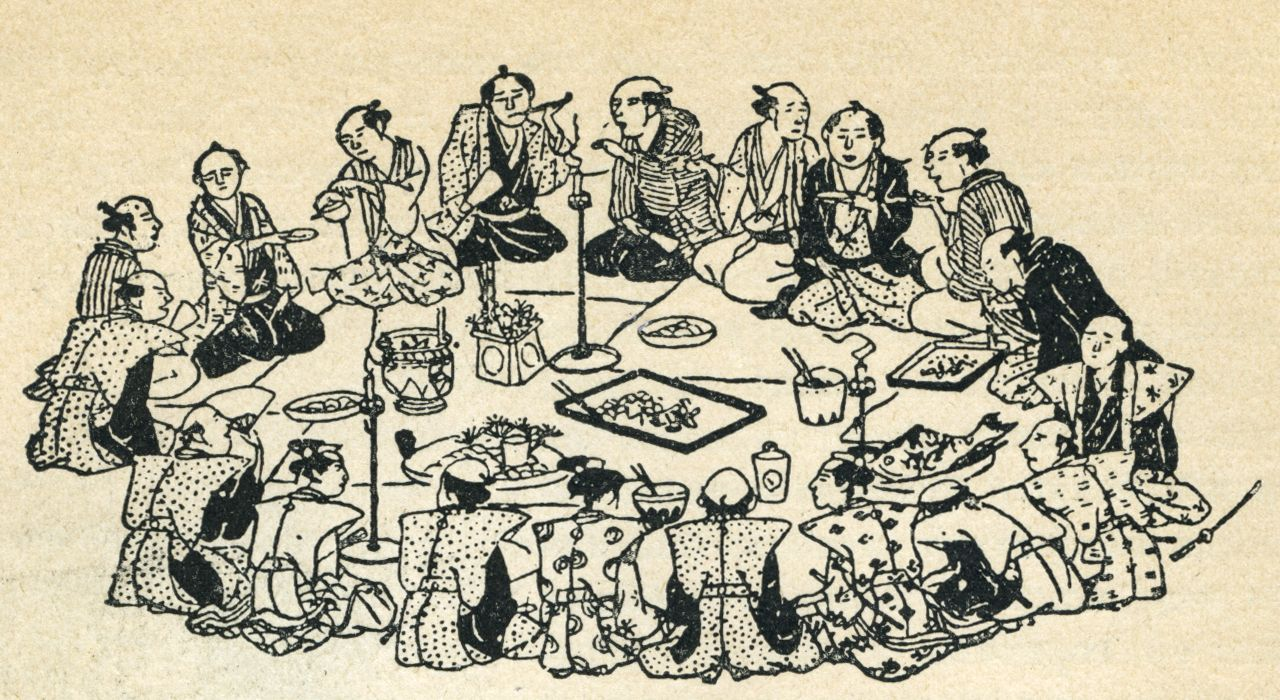
"Wedding." From the book Japan and Japanese (1902), p. 62.

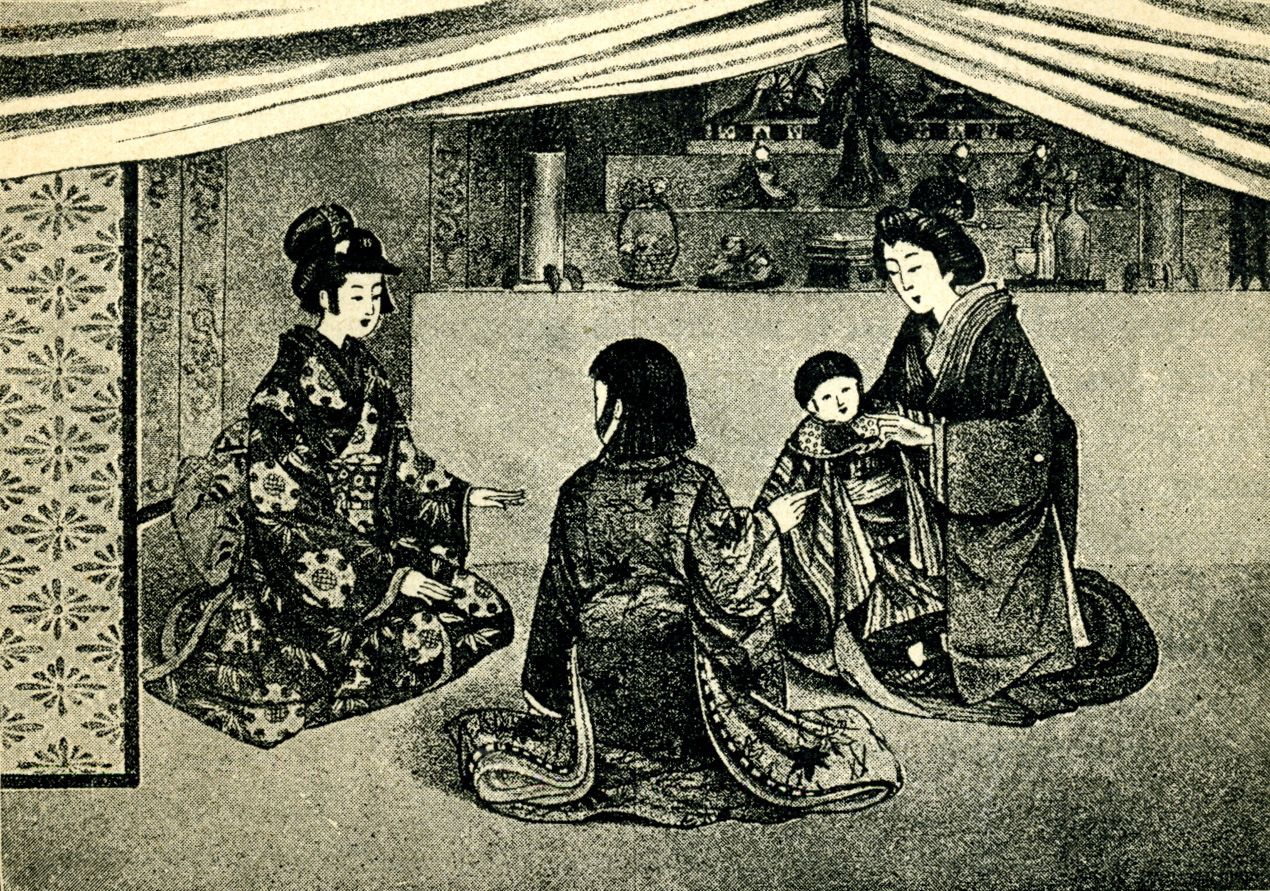
"Japanese at home." From the book Japan and Japanese (1902), p. 71. They are celebrating Girl's Day.

In pre-modern Japan, marriage was inextricable from the ie (家, 'family' or 'household'), the basic unit of society with a collective continuity independent of any individual life. Members of the household were expected to subordinate all their own interests to that of the ie, with respect for an ideal of filial piety and social hierarchy that borrowed much from Confucianism. The choice to remain single was the greatest crime a man could commit, according to Baron Hozumi.

Marriages were duly arranged by the head of the household, who represented it publicly and was legally responsible for its members, and any preference by either principal in a marital arrangement was considered improper. Property was regarded to belong to the ie rather than to individuals, and inheritance was strictly agnatic primogeniture. A woman (女) married the household (家) of her husband, hence the kanji for 'wife' (嫁, yome) and 'marriage', lit. 'wife entering' (嫁入り, yomeiri).

In the absence of sons, some households would adopt a male heir (養子; or yōshi) to maintain the dynasty, a practice which continues in corporate Japan. Nearly all adoptions are of adult men. Marriage was restricted to households of equal social standing (分限), which made selection a crucial, painstaking process. Although Confucian ethics encouraged people to marry outside their own group, limiting the search to a local community remained the easiest way to ensure an honorable match. Approximately one-in-five marriages in pre-modern Japan occurred between households that were already related.

Outcast communities such as the Burakumin could not marry outside of their caste, and marriage discrimination continued even after an 1871 edict abolished the caste system, well into the twentieth century.

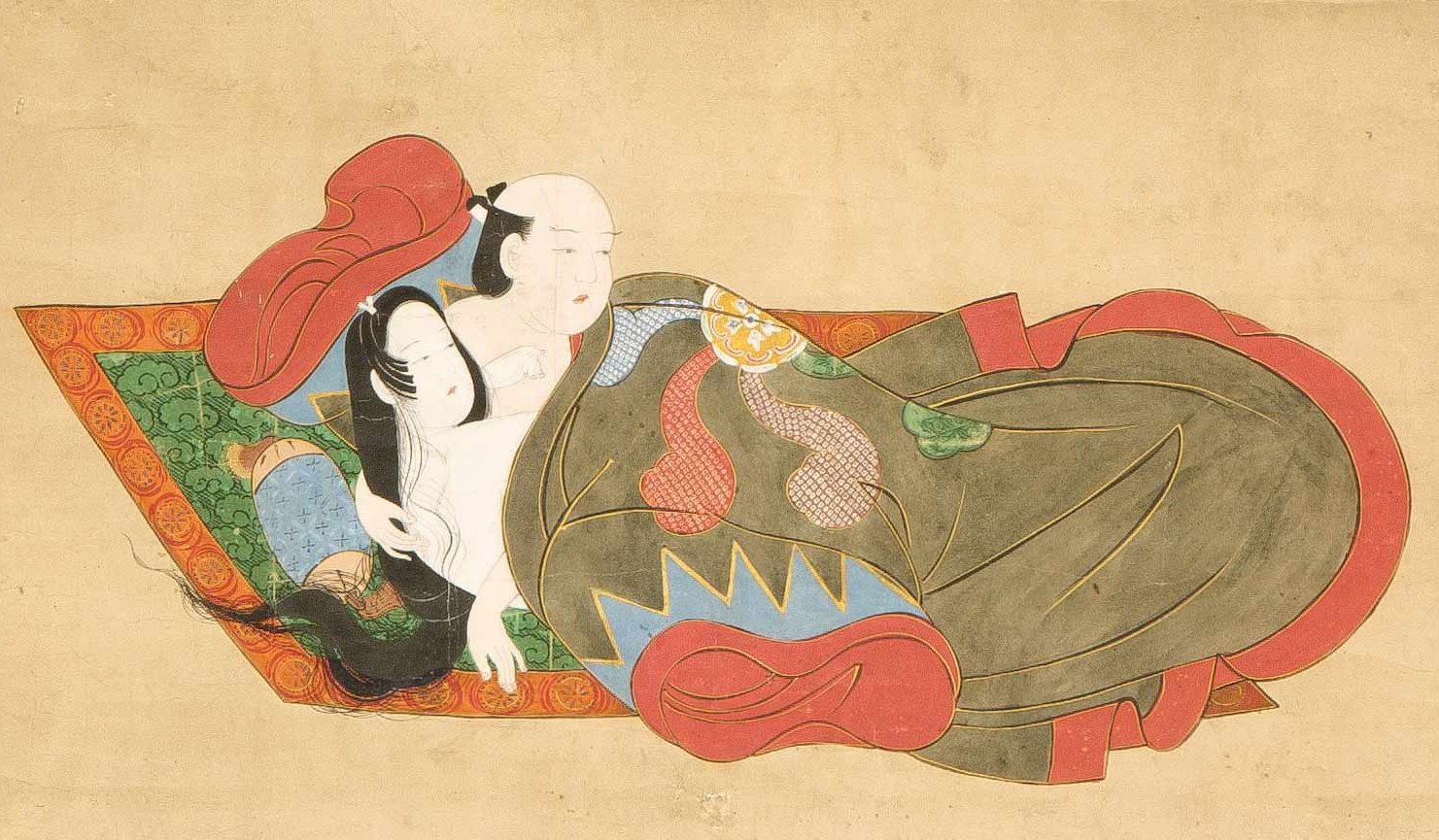
Caught in the Act, a hanging scroll by the Kanbun Master, late 1660s, Honolulu Museum of Art

The purposes of marriage in the medieval and Edo periods was to form alliances between families, to relieve the family of its female dependents, to perpetuate the family line, and, especially for the lower classes, to add new members to the family's workforce. The 17th century treatise Onna Daigaku ("Greater Learning for Women") instructed wives honor their parents-in-law before their own parents, and to be "courteous, humble, and conciliatory" towards their husbands.

Husbands were also encouraged to place the needs of their parents and children before those of their wives. One British observer remarked, "If you love your wife you spoil your mother's servant." The tension between a housewife and her mother-in-law has been a keynote of Japanese drama ever since.

Romantic love (愛情, aijō) played little part in medieval marriages, as emotional attachment was considered inconsistent with filial piety. A proverb said, "Those who come together in passion stay together in tears." For men, sexual gratification was seen as separate from conjugal relations with one's wife, where the purpose was procreation. The ukiyo-e (浮世絵, lit. 'floating world pictures') genre of woodblock prints celebrated the luxury and hedonism of the era, typically with depictions of beautiful courtesans and geisha of the pleasure districts. Concubinage and prostitution were common, public, and relatively respectable, until the social upheaval of the Meiji Restoration put an end to feudal society in Japan.

=== Meiji Restoration and modernization (1868–1912) ===
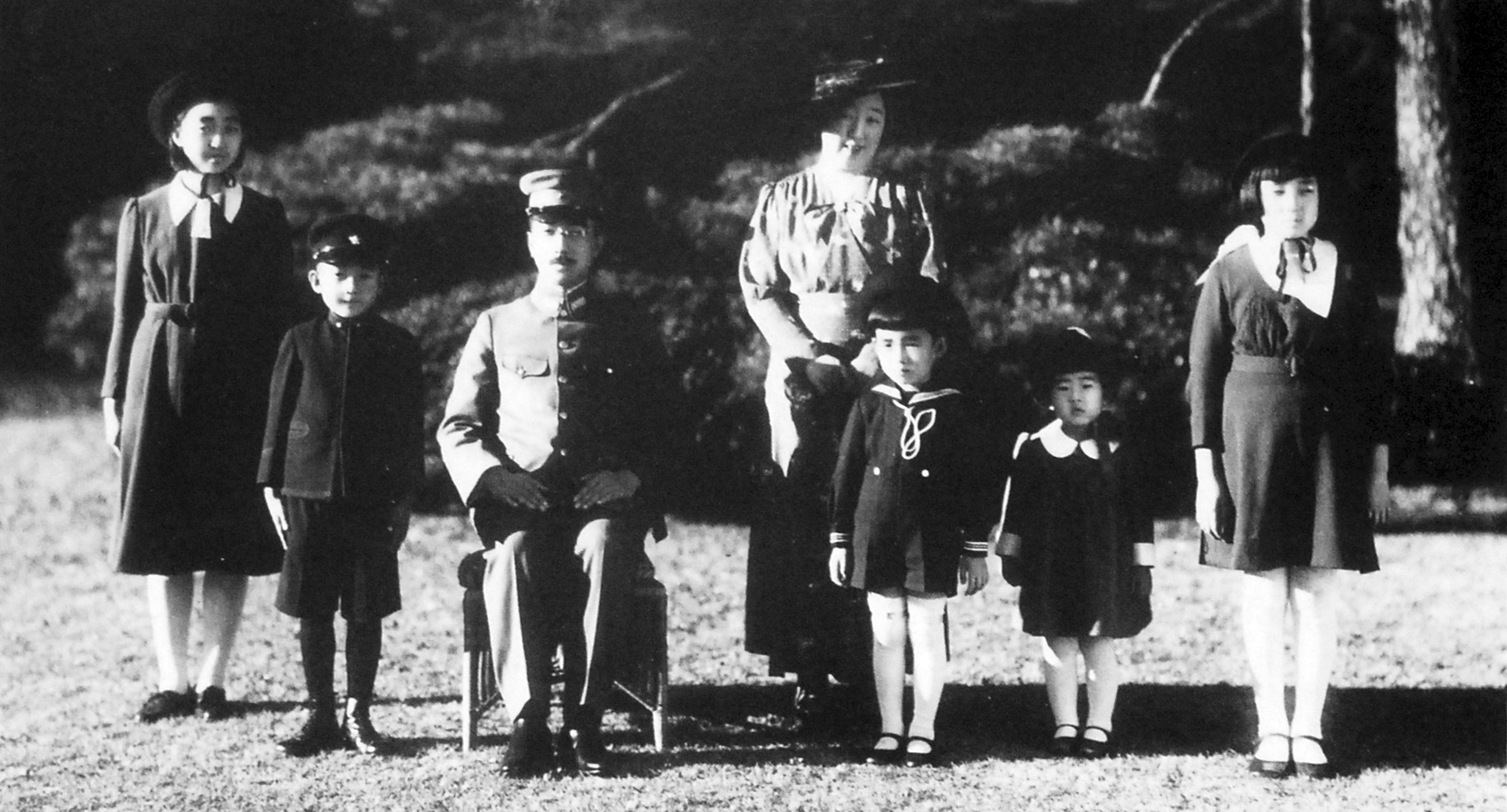
The Shōwa Emperor Hirohito with his wife, Empress Kōjun, and their children in 1941

During the Meiji period, upper class and samurai customs of arranged marriage steadily replaced the unions of choice and mutual attraction that rural commoners had once enjoyed. Rapid urbanization and industrialization brought more of the population into the cities, ending the isolation of rural life. Public education became almost universal between 1872 and the early 1900s, and schools stressed the traditional concept of filial piety, first toward the nation, second toward the household, and last of all toward a person's own private interests. Marriage under the Meiji Civil Code required the permission of the head of a household (Article 750) and of the parents for men under 30 and women under 25 (Article 772).

In arranged marriages, most couples met beforehand at a formal introduction called an omiai (お見合い, lit. 'looking at one another'), although some would meet for the first time at the wedding ceremony. A visitor to Japan described the omiai as "a meeting at which the lovers (if persons unknown to each other may be so styled) are allowed to see, sometimes even to speak to each other, and thus estimate each others' merits." However, their objections carried little weight. The meeting was originally a samurai custom which became widespread during the early twentieth century, when commoners began to arrange marriages for their children through a go-between (仲人, nakoudo) or matchmaker. The term omiai is still used to distinguish arranged marriages, even when no formal meeting takes place, from a "love match" (恋愛, ren'ai).

Marriage between a Japanese and non-Japanese person was not officially permitted until 14 March 1873. A foreign national was required to surrender their citizenship and acquire Japanese citizenship.

Courtship remained rare in Japan at this period. Boys and girls were separated in schools, in cinemas, and at social gatherings. Colleagues who began a romantic relationship could be dismissed, and during the Second World War traveling couples could be arrested. Parents sometimes staged an arranged marriage to legitimize a "love match," but many others resulted in separation and sometimes suicide. Love was thought to be inessential to marriage. A proposal by Baron Hozumi, who had studied abroad, that the absence of love be made a grounds for divorce failed to pass during debates on the Meiji Civil Code of 1898. One writer observed in 1930, "According to the traditional moral ideas, it is deemed a sign of mental and moral weakness to 'fall in love.'"

Marriage, like other social institutions of this period, emphasized the subordinate inferiority of women to men. Women learned that as a daughter they ought to obey their father, as a wife their husband, as a widow their sons. Chastity in marriage was expected for women, and a law not repealed until 1908 allowed a husband to kill his wife and her lover if he found them in an adulterous act. The prostitution of women survived the periodic intrusion of puritanical ideals on Japan's less restrictive sexuality.

Divorce laws become more equal over time. During the Edo period, a husband could divorce his wife by writing a letter of his intent to do so, but a wife's only recourse was to flee to a convent. The laws of the early Meiji period established several grounds on which a man could divorce: sterility, adultery, disobedience to parents-in-law, loquacity, larceny, jealousy, and disease. A wife, accompanied by a close male relative, could appeal for divorce if she had been deserted or imprisoned by her husband, or if he was profligate or mentally ill. The 1898 Civil Code established the principle of mutual consent, although the consent of women was still likely to be forced until the early 20th century, as women gradually gained access to education and financial independence. The fight for divorce rights marked the beginning of Japanese feminism.

=== Post-war period (1945–present) ===
Signed after the surrender and occupation of Japan by Allied forces, Article 24 of the Constitution of 1947 reestablished marriage on grounds of equality and choice: "Marriage shall be based only on the mutual consent of both sexes and it shall be maintained through mutual cooperation with the equal rights of husband and wife as a base. With regard to choice of spouse, property rights, inheritance, choice of domicile, divorce and other matters pertaining to marriage and the family, all laws shall be enacted from the standpoint of individual dignity and the essential equality of the sexes."

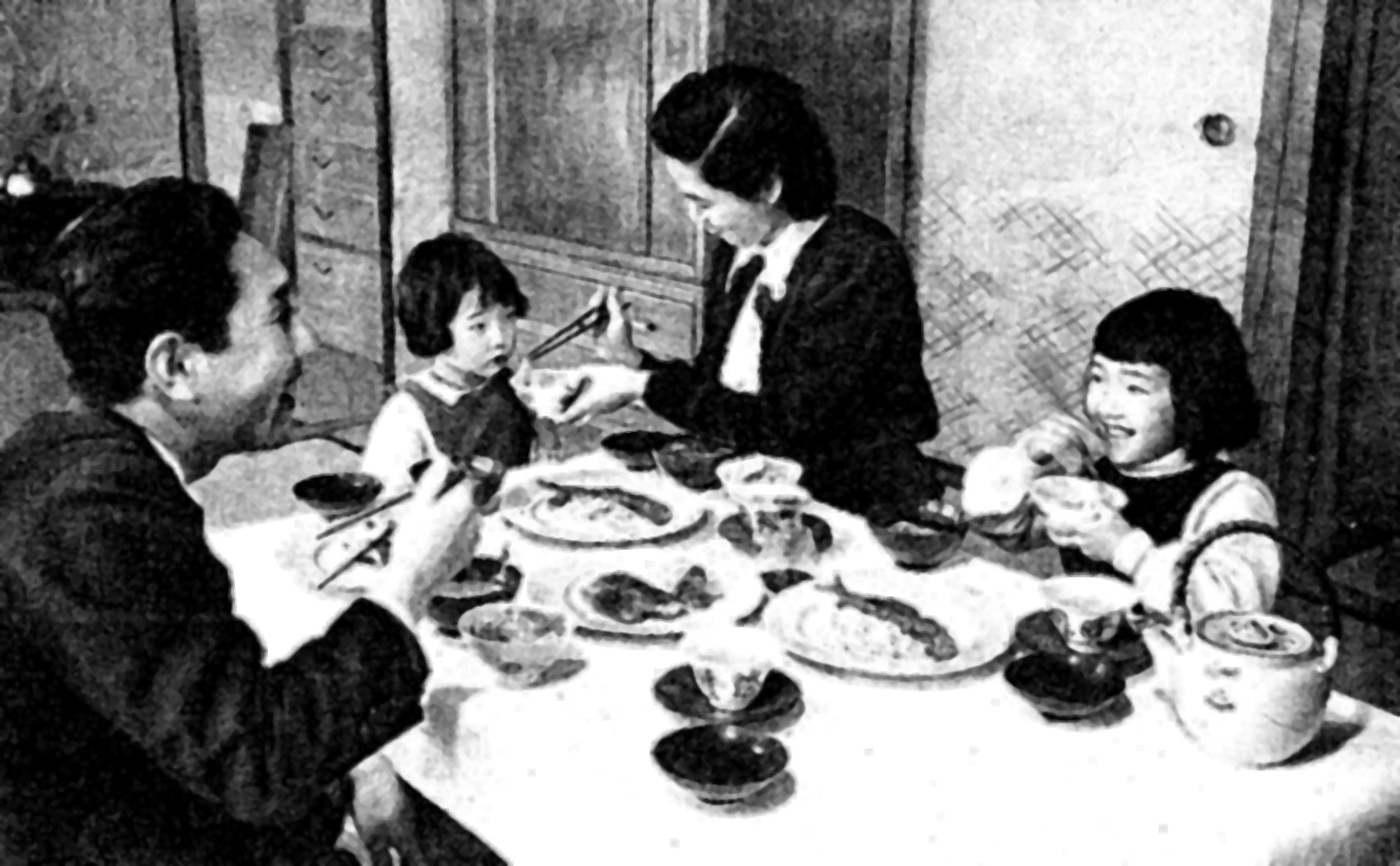
A family meal in the 1950s

The Constitution abolished the foundations of the ie system and the patriarchal authority at its heart. Each nuclear family retained, and still retains, a separate family registration sheet, initiated on marriage under the surname of the husband or wife, but the head of each household no longer had any special legal prerogatives over his or her dependents. All legitimate children, male or female, gained an equal right to inheritance, putting an end to primogeniture succession and the obsession with lineage. Women received the right to vote and the right to request a divorce on the basis of infidelity. The Meiji emphasis on Confucian values and national mythology disappeared from education. The conventional model of the ie was replaced with a new convention, the kazoku (家族, 'family') and the kakukazoku (核家族, 'nuclear family'), as the fundamental unit of society.

New demographic trends emerged, including a later age of marriage and a smaller difference in age between groom and bride, the birth of two children in quick succession, few children born out of wedlock, and a low divorce rate. Lifetime employment became the norm for Japanese men, especially during the post-war economic boom of the 1950s, 60s, and 70s. A middle class ideology established a gendered family pattern with separate social spheres: a salaried husband to provide the family income, a housewife to manage the home and nurture the children, and a commitment by the children to education. Better health and nutrition meant a rapid extension of life expectancy, and government policies have encouraged people to form 'three-generation families' (三世代家族, sansedai kazoku) to manage a rapidly aging society.

Omiai marriages, arranged by the parents or a matchmaker, remained the norm immediately after the war, although the decades which followed saw a steady rise in the number of ren'ai 'love matches'. The distinction between the two has blurred: parents almost always consulted young people before "arranging" a marriage, and many young people asked an employer or teacher to serve as matchmaker for their "love match." Today only one in 20 married couples describe their formation as arranged, and a courtship of several years has become the norm even for relationships that begin with an omiai. Three in five couples meet in the workplace or through friends or siblings.

Online dating services in Japan gained a reputation as platforms for soliciting sex, often from underage girls, for sexual harassment and assault, and for using decoy accounts (called otori or sakura in Japanese) to string along users in order to extend their subscriptions. Newer services like Pairs, with 8 million users, or Omiai have introduced ID checks, age limits, strict moderation, and use of artificial intelligence to arrange matches for serious seekers. Profiles typically include age, location, height, career, and salary, but can also include interests, hobbies, and familial interests.

The term 'marriage hunting' (kekkon katsudo, or konkatsu), has become popular since 2007. It reflects a professional class of matchmaking services which arrange meetings between potential partners, typically through social events, and often includes the exchange of resumes. Japanese marriage agencies (結婚相談所, kekkonsoudanjyo), and the associations they are members of, have become increasingly popular since 2005. The Japanese government has also produced papers regarding the use of marriage agencies, notably for stimulating international marriage as a method of combating issues of declining population.

== Statistics ==
=== Marriage statistics ===
Source: National Institute of Population and Social Security Research (IPSS)

	Number of marriages	Marriage rate	Husband		Wife		Percentage of first marriages	
	Number of marriages	Marriage rate	Number of first marriages	Number of remarriages	Number of first marriages	Number of remarriages	husband	wife
1883	337,456	9.0						
1890	325,141	8.1						
1900	346,528	7.9	278,384	66,398	294,606	45,820	80.3	85.0
1910	441,222	9.0	368,111	69,975	390,466	47,838	83.4	88.5
1920	546,207	9.8	453,139	92,280	489,737	55,524	83.0	89.7
1925	521,438	8.7	444,462	76,509	475,931	45,075	85.2	91.3
1930	506,674	7.9	437,094	68,774	465,128	40,524	86.3	91.8
1935	556,730	8.0	485,452	71,137	515,706	40,777	87.2	92.6
1940	666,575	9.3	580,283	85,437	616,735	47,449	87.1	92.5
1947	934,170	12.0	…	…	…	…	…	…
1948	953,999	12.0	…	…	…	…	…	…
1949	842,170	10.4	…	…	…	…	…	…
1950	715,081	8.6	…	…	…	…	…	…
1951	671,905	8.0	…	…	…	…	…	…
1952	676,995	7.9	578,687	98,308	606,538	70,457	85.5	89.6
1953	682,077	7.9	589,719	92,358	618,669	63,408	86.5	90.7
1954	697,809	8.0	607,436	90,373	637,350	60,459	87.0	91.3
1955	714,861	8.1	626,394	88,467	656,591	58,270	87.6	91.8
1956	715,934	8.0	631,134	84,800	659,673	56,261	88.2	92.1
1957	773,362	8.6	687,680	85,682	717,305	56,057	88.9	92.8
1958	826,902	9.1	741,221	85,681	771,529	55,373	89.6	93.3
1959	847,135	9.2	763,252	83,883	793,413	53,722	90.1	93.7
1960	866,115	9.3	782,021	84,094	812,597	53,518	90.3	93.8
1961	890,158	9.5	808,483	81,675	838,354	51,804	90.8	94.2
1962	928,341	9.8	843,934	84,407	874,667	53,674	90.9	94.2
1963	937,516	9.8	855,688	81,828	884,756	52,760	91.3	94.4
1964	963,130	10.0	880,175	82,955	909,165	53,965	91.4	94.4
1965	954,852	9.8	872,649	82,203	900,304	54,548	91.4	94.3
1966	940,120	9.5	860,197	79,923	886,108	54,012	91.5	94.3
1967	953,096	9.6	871,919	81,177	897,156	55,940	91.5	94.1
1968	956,312	9.5	876,803	79,509	900,586	55,726	91.7	94.2
1969	984,142	9.7	902,251	81,891	925,538	58,604	91.7	94.0
1970	1,029,405	10.0	943,783	85,622	967,716	61,689	91.7	94.0
1971	1,091,229	10.4	1,003,381	87,848	1,026,772	64,457	91.9	94.1
1972	1,099,984	10.4	1,011,042	88,942	1,032,967	67,017	91.9	93.9
1973	1,071,923	9.9	983,035	88,888	1,002,656	69,267	91.7	93.5
1974	1,000,455	9.1	911,808	88,647	929,824	70,631	91.1	92.9
1975	941,628	8.5	855,825	85,803	871,445	70,183	90.9	92.5
1976	871,543	7.8	787,521	84,022	801,264	70,279	90.4	91.9
1977	821,029	7.2	738,321	82,708	750,756	70,273	89.9	91.4
1978	793,257	6.9	710,875	82,382	722,577	70,680	89.6	91.1
1979	788,505	6.8	704,321	84,184	715,551	72,954	89.3	90.7
1980	774,702	6.7	690,885	83,817	701,415	73,287	89.2	90.5
1981	776,531	6.6	691,448	85,083	702,259	74,272	89.0	90.4
1982	781,252	6.6	693,990	87,262	704,840	76,412	88.8	90.2
1983	762,552	6.4	675,514	87,038	686,477	76,075	88.6	90.0
1984	739,991	6.2	652,618	87,373	663,021	76,970	88.2	89.6
1985	735,850	6.1	646,241	89,609	656,609	79,241	87.8	89.2
1986	710,962	5.9	620,754	90,208	630,353	80,609	87.3	88.7
1987	696,173	5.7	605,675	90,498	615,148	81,025	87.0	88.4
1988	707,716	5.8	613,919	93,797	623,743	83,973	86.7	88.1
1989	708,316	5.8	611,963	96,353	623,485	84,831	86.4	88.0
1990	722,138	5.9	625,453	96,685	637,472	84,666	86.6	88.3
1991	742,264	6.0	645,790	96,474	657,715	84,549	87.0	88.6
1992	754,441	6.1	657,540	96,901	669,760	84,681	87.2	88.8
1993	792,658	6.4	692,214	100,444	704,929	87,729	87.3	88.9
1994	782,738	6.3	681,759	100,979	693,853	88,885	87.1	88.6
1995	791,888	6.4	687,167	104,721	700,158	91,730	86.8	88.4
1996	795,080	6.4	688,887	106,193	701,776	93,304	86.6	88.3
1997	775,651	6.2	670,007	105,644	681,468	94,183	86.4	87.9
1998	784,595	6.3	675,519	109,076	687,552	97,043	86.1	87.6
1999	762,028	6.1	651,925	110,103	664,379	97,649	85.6	87.2
2000	798,138	6.4	678,174	119,964	691,507	106,631	85.0	86.6
2001	799,999	6.4	674,770	125,229	687,683	112,316	84.3	86.0
2002	757,331	6.0	633,543	123,788	645,138	112,193	83.7	85.2
2003	740,191	5.9	613,727	126,464	626,327	113,864	82.9	84.6
2004	720,418	5.7	592,449	127,969	605,936	114,482	82.2	84.1
2005	714,265	5.7	584,076	130,189	599,691	114,574	81.8	84.0
2006	730,973	5.8	593,728	137,245	612,134	118,839	81.2	83.7
2007	719,822	5.7	584,416	135,406	600,743	119,079	81.2	83.5
2008	726,106	5.7	590,573	135,533	605,868	120,238	81.3	83.4
2009	707,740	5.6	575,103	132,637	591,320	116,420	81.3	83.6
2010	700,222	5.5	570,576	129,646	586,719	113,503	81.5	83.8
2011	661,898	5.2	537,685	124,213	553,666	108,232	81.2	83.6
2012	668,870	5.3	541,918	126,952	559,372	109,498	81.0	83.6
2013	660,622	5.3	533,711	126,911	551,824	108,798	80.8	83.5
2014	643,783	5.1	519,406	124,377	537,193	106,590	80.7	83.4
2015	635,225	5.1	510,296	124,929	528,611	106,614	80.3	83.2
2016	620,707	5.0	499,377	121,330	516,684	104,023	80.5	83.2
2017	606,952	4.9	488,739	118,213	505,721	101,231	80.5	83.3
2018	586,481	4.7	471,188	115,293	487,652	98,829	80.3	83.1
2019	599,007	4.8	481,113	117,894	497,598	101,409	80.3	83.1
2020	525,507	4.3	423,484	102,023	437,169	88,338	80.6	83.2
2021	501,138	4.1	405,214	95,924	417,783	83,355	80.9	83.4
2022	504,930	4.1	410,929	94,001	424,282	80,648	81.4	84.0
2023	474,741	3.9	386,863	87,878	398,639	76,102	81.5	84.0

=== Age at marriage ===
	All marriages			First marriages		
	Husband	Wife	Age gap	Husband	Wife	Age gap
1899	27.6	23.0	4.6	…	…	…
1900	27.7	23.1	4.6	…	…	…
1905	28.6	24.0	4.6	…	…	…
1910	28.7	24.0	4.7	27.0	23.0	4.0
1915	29.1	24.3	4.8	27.4	23.2	4.2
1920	29.2	24.2	5.0	27.4	23.2	4.2
1925	28.8	24.0	4.8	27.1	23.1	4.0
1930	28.9	24.1	4.8	27.3	23.2	4.1
1935	29.0	24.6	4.4	27.8	23.8	4.0
1940	30.0	24.9	5.1	29.0	24.6	4.4
1947	…	…	…	26.1	22.9	3.2
1950	…	…	…	25.9	23.0	2.9
1955	27.7	24.3	3.4	26.6	23.8	2.8
1960	28.1	24.8	3.3	27.2	24.4	2.8
1965	28.1	24.9	3.2	27.2	24.5	2.7
1970	27.6	24.6	3.0	26.9	24.2	2.7
1971	27.5	24.5	3.0	26.8	24.2	2.6
1972	27.4	24.7	2.7	26.7	24.2	2.5
1973	27.4	24.7	2.7	26.7	24.3	2.4
1974	27.6	25.0	2.6	26.8	24.5	2.3
1975	27.8	25.2	2.6	27.0	24.7	2.3
1976	28.0	25.4	2.6	27.2	24.9	2.3
1977	28.2	25.6	2.6	27.4	25.0	2.4
1978	28.5	25.7	2.8	27.6	25.1	2.5
1979	28.6	25.8	2.8	27.7	25.2	2.5
1980	28.7	25.9	2.8	27.8	25.2	2.6
1981	28.9	26.0	2.8	27.9	25.3	2.6
1982	29.0	26.1	2.9	28.0	25.3	2.7
1983	29.0	26.1	2.9	28.0	25.4	2.7
1984	29.1	26.2	2.9	28.1	25.4	2.7
1985	29.3	26.4	2.9	28.2	25.5	2.7
1986	29.5	26.5	2.9	28.3	25.6	2.7
1987	29.6	26.7	2.9	28.4	25.7	2.7
1988	29.7	26.8	2.9	28.4	25.8	2.6
1989	29.8	26.9	2.9	28.5	25.8	2.6
1990	29.7	26.9	2.8	28.4	25.9	2.5
1991	29.6	26.9	2.8	28.4	25.9	2.5
1992	29.7	27.0	2.7	28.4	26.0	2.4
1993	29.7	27.1	2.6	28.4	26.1	2.3
1994	29.8	27.2	2.6	28.5	26.2	2.3
1995	29.8	27.3	2.5	28.5	26.3	2.2
1996	29.9	27.5	2.4	28.5	26.4	2.1
1997	29.9	27.6	2.3	28.5	26.6	1.9
1998	30.0	27.7	2.3	28.6	26.7	1.9
1999	30.2	27.9	2.3	28.7	26.8	1.9
2000	30.4	28.2	2.2	28.8	27.0	1.8
2001	30.6	28.4	2.2	29.0	27.2	1.8
2002	30.8	28.6	2.2	29.1	27.4	1.8
2003	31.2	29.0	2.2	29.4	27.6	1.8
2004	31.5	29.2	2.3	29.6	27.8	1.8
2005	31.7	29.4	2.3	29.8	28.0	1.8
2006	32.0	29.6	2.4	30.0	28.2	1.8
2007	32.1	29.8	2.3	30.1	28.3	1.8
2008	32.2	29.9	2.3	30.2	28.5	1.8
2009	32.4	30.1	2.3	30.4	28.6	1.8
2010	32.5	30.3	2.2	30.5	28.8	1.7
2011	32.7	30.5	2.2	30.7	29.0	1.7
2012	32.9	30.7	2.2	30.8	29.2	1.7
2013	33.0	30.8	2.2	30.9	29.3	1.7
2014	33.2	30.9	2.2	31.1	29.4	1.7
2015	33.3	31.1	2.2	31.1	29.4	1.7
2016	33.3	31.1	2.2	31.1	29.4	1.7
2017	33.4	31.1	2.3	31.1	29.4	1.7
2018	33.5	31.2	2.3	31.1	29.4	1.7
2019	33.6	31.4	2.2	31.2	29.6	1.7
2020	33.4	31.3	2.1	31.0	29.4	1.5
2021	33.5	31.4	2.0	31.0	29.5	1.5
2022	33.7	31.7	2.1	31.1	29.7	1.5
2023	33.9	31.8	2.0	31.1	29.7	1.4

=== Demographic ===
Total fertility rate and Birth of Japan

According to the 2010 census, 58.9% of Japan's adult population is married, 13.9% of women and 3.1% of men are widowed, and 5.9% of women and 3.8% of men are divorced. The annual number of marriages has dropped since the early 1970s, while divorces have shown a general upward trend.

=== Marriage and fertility ===
The percentage of births to unmarried women in selected countries, 1980 and 2007. As can be seen in the figure, Japan has not followed the trend of other similarly developed countries of children born outside of marriage to the same degree.

The decline of marriage in Japan, as fewer people marry and do so later in life, is a widely cited explanation for the plummeting birth rate. Although the total fertility rate has dropped since the 1970s (to 1.43 in 2013), birth statistics for married women have remained fairly constant (at around 2.1) and most married couples have two or more children. Economic factors, such as the cost of raising a child, work–family conflicts, and insufficient housing, are the most common reasons for young mothers (under 34) to have fewer children than desired.

The number of single-child or childless couples has increased since 2002 (to 23.3 percent in 2010) even as the desire for larger families remains the same. Only 2% of births occurred outside of marriage, compared to 30-60% of births in Europe and North America. This is due to social taboos, legal pressure, and financial hurdles.

Half of Japan's single mothers live below the poverty line, among the highest for OECD countries. In addition, an estimated 3.5 million Japanese children, one in six of those below the age of 18, are from households classed as experiencing "relative poverty" by the OECD.

=== Fewer marriages ===
Almost 90% of unmarried Japanese intend to marry, and yet the percentage of people who do not continues to rise. Between 1990 and 2010, the percentage of 50 year-old people who had never married roughly quadrupled for men to 20.1%, and doubled for women to 10.6%. The Ministry of Health, Labour and Welfare predicts these numbers to rise to 29% of men and 19.2% of women by 2035. The government's population institute estimated in 2014 that women in their early 20s had a one-in-four chance of never marrying, and a two-in-five chance of remaining childless.

Recent media coverage has sensationalized surveys from the Japan Family Planning Association and the Cabinet Office that show a declining interest in dating and sexual relationships among young people, especially among men. However, changes in sexuality and fertility are more likely an outcome of the decline in family formation than its cause. Since the usual purpose of dating in Japan is marriage, the reluctance to marry often translates to a reluctance to engage in more casual relationships.

The majority of Japanese people remain committed to traditional ideas of family, with a husband who provides financial support, a wife who works in the home, and two children. Labor practices, such as long working hours, health insurance, and the national pension system, are premised on a traditional breadwinner model. As a result, Japan has largely maintained a gender-based division of labor with one of the largest gender pay gaps in the developed world, even as other countries began moving towards more equal arrangements in the 1970s.

However, economic stagnation, anemic wage growth, and job insecurity have made it more and more difficult for young Japanese couples to secure the income necessary to create a conventional family, despite their desire to do so. Japan was once well known for lifetime employment, but after the burst of the Japanese asset price bubble and the 1997 Asian financial crisis, regular employment for unmarried men age 25-34 dropped from 78% in 1982 to 55% in 2010 as companies began employing more people on temporary or part-time contracts. These non-regular employees earn about 53% less than regular ones on a comparable monthly basis, according to the Labor Ministry, and as primary earners are seven times more likely to fall below the poverty line. Men in this group are more than twice as reluctant to consider marriage, and in their 30s they are about 40% less likely to be married than those with regular employment.

According to the sociologist Masahiro Yamada, the failure of conventions to adapt to the economic and social realities of Japanese society has caused a "gap in family formation" between those who succeed in creating a conventional family and those who remain single and childless.

=== Later marriages ===
The average age at first marriage in Japan has climbed steadily from the middle of the 20th century to around 31 for men and 29 for women in 2013, among the highest in Asia. Women postpone marriage for a variety of reasons, including high personal and financial expectations, increasing independence afforded by education and employment, and the difficulty of balancing work and family. Masahiro Yamada coined the term parasite singles (パラサイトシングル, parasaito shinguru) for unmarried adults in their late 20s and 30s who live with their parents, though it usually refers to women. Men who do not aggressively pursue marriage are known as herbivore men (草食男子, sōshoku danshi).

== International marriage ==
=== United States-Japan intermarriages ===
American husbands make up 17% of all foreign husbands in Japan, while American wives make up 1% of foreign wives in Japan. Since 1965, the percentage of marriages to American women has declined precipitously, from 6% to 1%, which can be attributed to the long-term decline of the Japanese economy.

=== Russia-Japan intermarriage ===
According to the Ministry of Justice in 2010, 2,096 Russian, 404 Ukrainian, and 56 Belarusians were married to Japanese nationals, representing a minor share of cross-national marriages in Japan. Most of these were women married to Japanese husbands. It is estimated that in total, 3,000 to 5,000 Russian-speaking spouses married are Japanese men.

=== Global intermarriage trends ===
Of the 599,007 marriages registered in 2019, 21,919 (or about 1 in 30) were between a Japanese and a foreign national, according to the Ministry of Health, Labour, and Welfare. The number of international unions rose rapidly in the 1980s and 90s, peaked in 2006 at 44,701 (about 1 in 16), and has declined since then. Changes in the Immigration Control Act in 2005, which made it more difficult for Philippine nationals to work in Japan, are one cause of the decline. Filipino women saw the largest drop, from 12,150 in 2006 to 3,118 or 20.1% of foreign brides in 2013. Many Filipino women come to Japan as entertainers, and some have been victims of domestic violence.

Of the 14,911 non-Japanese brides in 2019, most came from China (about 31.6%), followed by the Philippines (about 24.5%), Korea (about 11.2%), Thailand (about 6.6%), Brazil (about 2.1%), United States (about 1.9%). The 7,008 grooms came from Korea (about 25.1%), United States (about 14.1%), China (about 13%), and Brazil (about 4.7%).

Of the 1 million children born in Japan in 2013, 2.2% had one or more non-Japanese parent. The rise in international households has sometimes led to conflicts over custody. Biracial Japanese children are often called hāfu (ハーフ), although the term is considered offensive by some.

For an international marriage to take place in Japan, the following documentation is required:

- A sworn Affidavit of Competency to Marry
- An original birth certificate
- Passport, Japanese Drivers License, or Residents' Card (Zairyo Card)
- Certificate of Marriage Notification (婚姻届書)

In certain cases additional documentation is required, notably for those from China.

== Domestic violence ==
According to a summary of surveys by Japan's Cabinet Office in 2023, 27.5% of wives and 22% of husbands have experienced either threats, physical violence, or rape. Dating abuse has also been reported by 22.7% of women and 12% of men, significantly higher than in previous years.

== Marriage law ==
A marriage is legally recognized once a couple has successfully submitted the required documents to the city hall registrar to change their status in their koseki (戸籍, family registration sheet) family registration sheet. No ceremony is required under Japanese law. The family registration sheet serves as birth certificate, proof of citizenship, marriage license, and death certificate. A register is kept for each nuclear family, under the name of the head of the household (筆頭者, hittousya), with the spouse and unmarried children who are registered as dependents.

A couple who marries must file a marriage registration form (婚姻届, kon'in todoke) to create a new registration sheet (新戸籍, shinkoseki) under a common surname. Since 1947, couples have been permitted to choose either the surname of the husband or wife, consistent with a ban on separate surnames first imposed in 1898. Married couples are estimated to choose the man's surname 96% of the time, although some women continue to use their maiden name informally. The ban has survived several legal challenges on the basis of gender inequality, most recently in 2015. When marriage is used to adopt a male heir, the husband takes his wife's family name.

International marriages are subject to separate rules within Japan. Foreigners in Japan do not have their own family registration sheet, and therefore those who marry a Japanese national are listed on his or her family's sheet. Foreign spouses in Japan are eligible for a long-term dependent visa.

Children born out of wedlock are recorded as illegitimate on their mother's family register, although they can be legitimized by a later acknowledgment of paternity. Illegitimate children were eligible for half the inheritance of legitimate ones until a court ruling in 2013.

== Wedding ceremonies ==
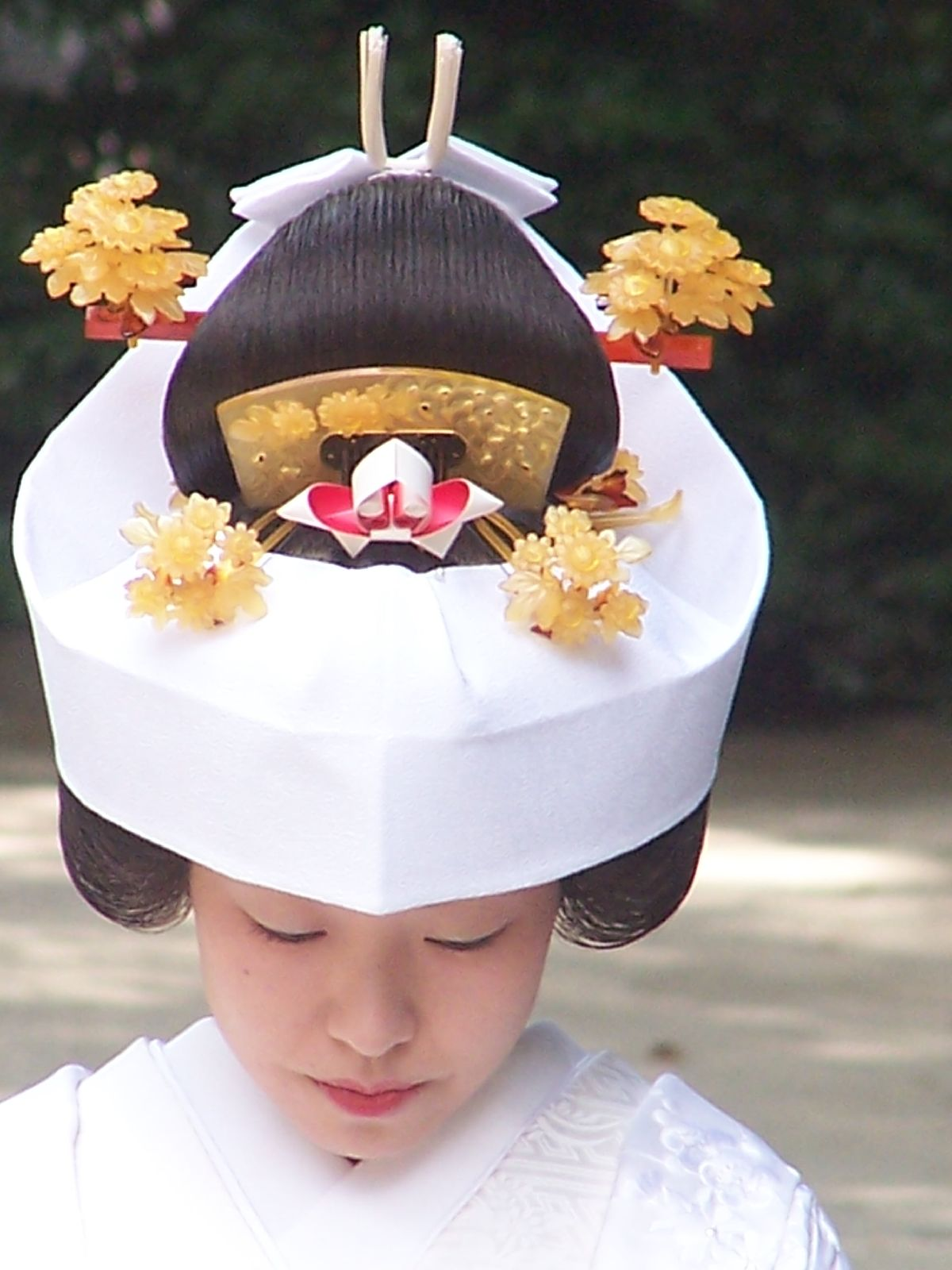
A bride in tsunokakushi and shiromuku at Tokyo's Meiji Shrine

A common description of Japan's religious syncretism says: "Born Shinto, married Christian, die Buddhist." In practice, however, elements of all three major traditions tend to be practiced side by side. Japanese weddings usually begin with a Shinto or Western Christian-style ceremony for family members and very close friends before a reception dinner and after-party at a restaurant or hotel banquet hall. There the couple's extended families and friends make speeches and offer 'gift money' (ご祝儀, goshūgi) in a special envelope. Close family pay about twice as much as friends.

=== Japanese Shinto ceremonies ===
Traditional Shinto ceremonies (神前式, shinzen shiki), which account for around one in six of Japanese weddings, are held in the main building of a shrine. A priest performs a ritual purification for the couple, then announces their marriage to the kami (神, 'gods' or 'spirits') of the shrine and asks for their blessing. The bride and groom take three sips each from three cups of sake, a ritual called sansankudo (三三九度, literally 'three cups thrice').

Japanese brides wear a kimono, which is either a shiromuku (白無垢, 'pure white dress'), iro uchikake (色打掛, 'colorful outer robe'), or kurobiki furisode (黒引き振袖), the black and patterned kimono once worn at weddings of the nobility during the Edo period (1603–1868), with either an open white watabōshi (綿帽子) or a 角隠し (tsunokakushi). Grooms wear a black crested haori (羽織) jacket and loose, skirt-like hakama (袴) with a vertical stripe.

=== Christian chapel ceremonies ===
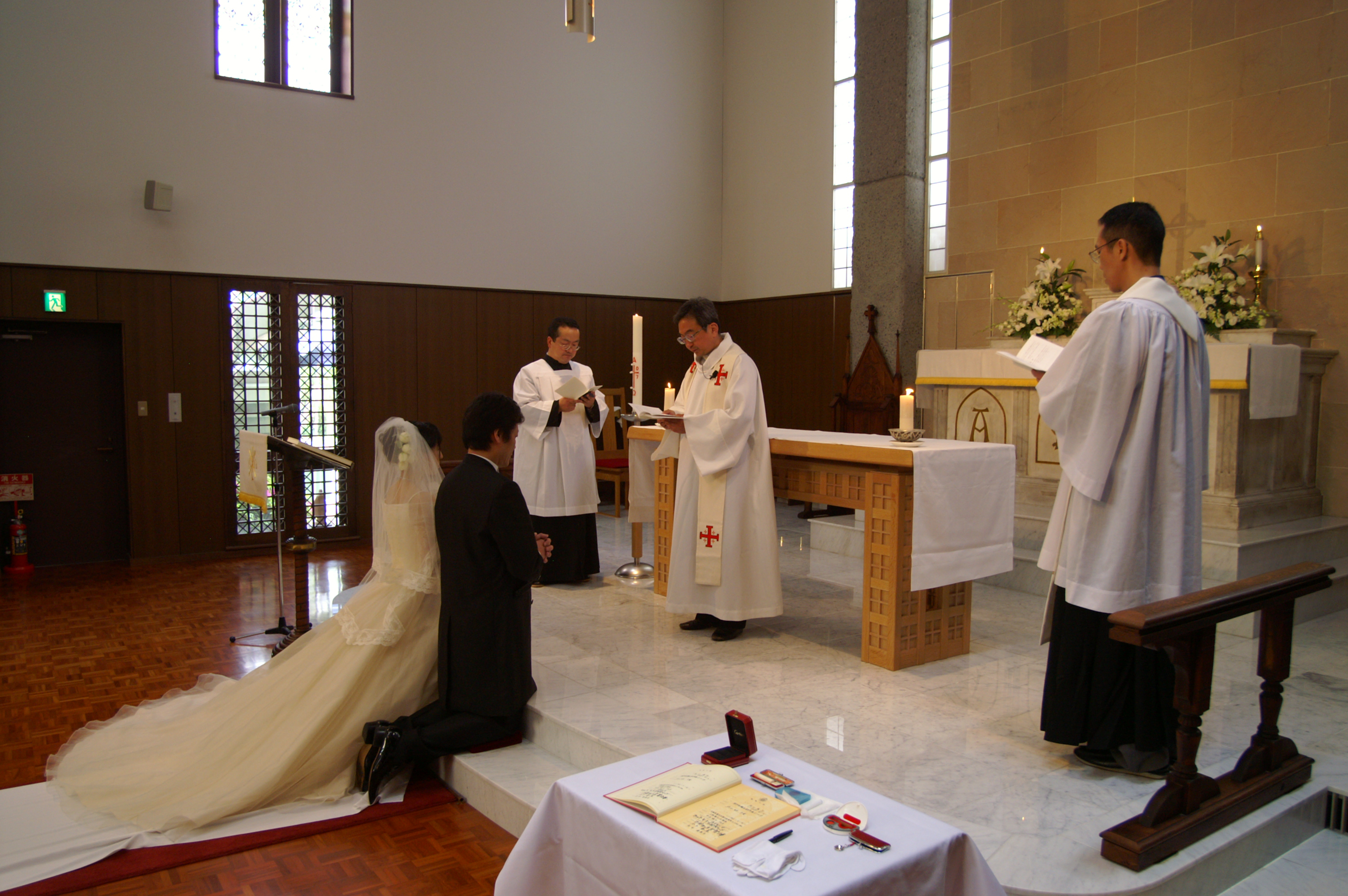
A Christian wedding in Kyoto

Christian wedding ceremonies have since the mid-1990s displaced the Shinto rite and continue to remain Japan's wedding ceremony of choice. Christian wedding ceremonies have in the last thirty years moved from the sideline to the mainstream of Japanese society. The popularity of Christian wedding ceremonies represents new widespread acceptance, commercialization, and popularity of a religious ceremony. The postwar history of Christian wedding ceremonies is best understood in light of the efforts made by traditional Christian churches and the bridal industry to meet the religious needs and demands of Japan's largely "nonreligious" (mushūkyō) constituency.

=== Non-religious or civil ceremonies ===
Non-religious or civil ceremonies often take place in a banquet hall, before or during the reception party, with a Master of Ceremonies officiating and guests seated around tables. Although these ceremonies often adopt Western elements, especially a wedding dress for the bride and a tuxedo for the groom, they forego any religious connotations.

Some younger couples choose to abandon formality entirely for a "no host party" wedding, which emphasizes celebration rather than ceremony. The guests consist primarily of the couple's friends, who pay an attendance fee.

== See also ==
- Aging of Japan
- Confucian view of marriage
- Japanese family
- Family law in Japan
- Recognition of same-sex unions in Japan
- Shinto wedding
- Women in Japan

== Bibliography ==
- Edwards, Walter. Modern Japan Through Its Weddings: Gender, Person, and Society in Ritual Portrayal. Stanford: Stanford University Press, 1989.
- Fukutake, Tadashi. Japanese Rural Society. Trans. by R. P. Dore. Tokyo: Oxford University Press, 1967.
- Hendry, Joy. Marriage in Changing Japan: Community & Society. Rutland, Vt, and Tokyo, 1979.
- Kawashima, Takeyoshi. Kekkon (Marriage). Tokyo: Iwanami Shinso, 1954.
- LeFebvre, J. (2015). Christian wedding ceremonies: "Nonreligiousness" in contemporary Japan. Japanese Journal of Religious Studies, 42(2), 185–203.
- National Institute of Population and Social Security Research (IPSS). "Attitudes toward Marriage and Family among Japanese Singles." 2011.
- National Institute of Population and Social Security Research (IPSS). "Marriage Process and Fertility of Japanese Married Couples." 2011.
- Tamura, Naoomi. The Japanese Bride. New York: Harper & Brother Publishers, 1893.
