= Aging of Japan =

Population pyramid of Japan from 2020 to projections up to 2100

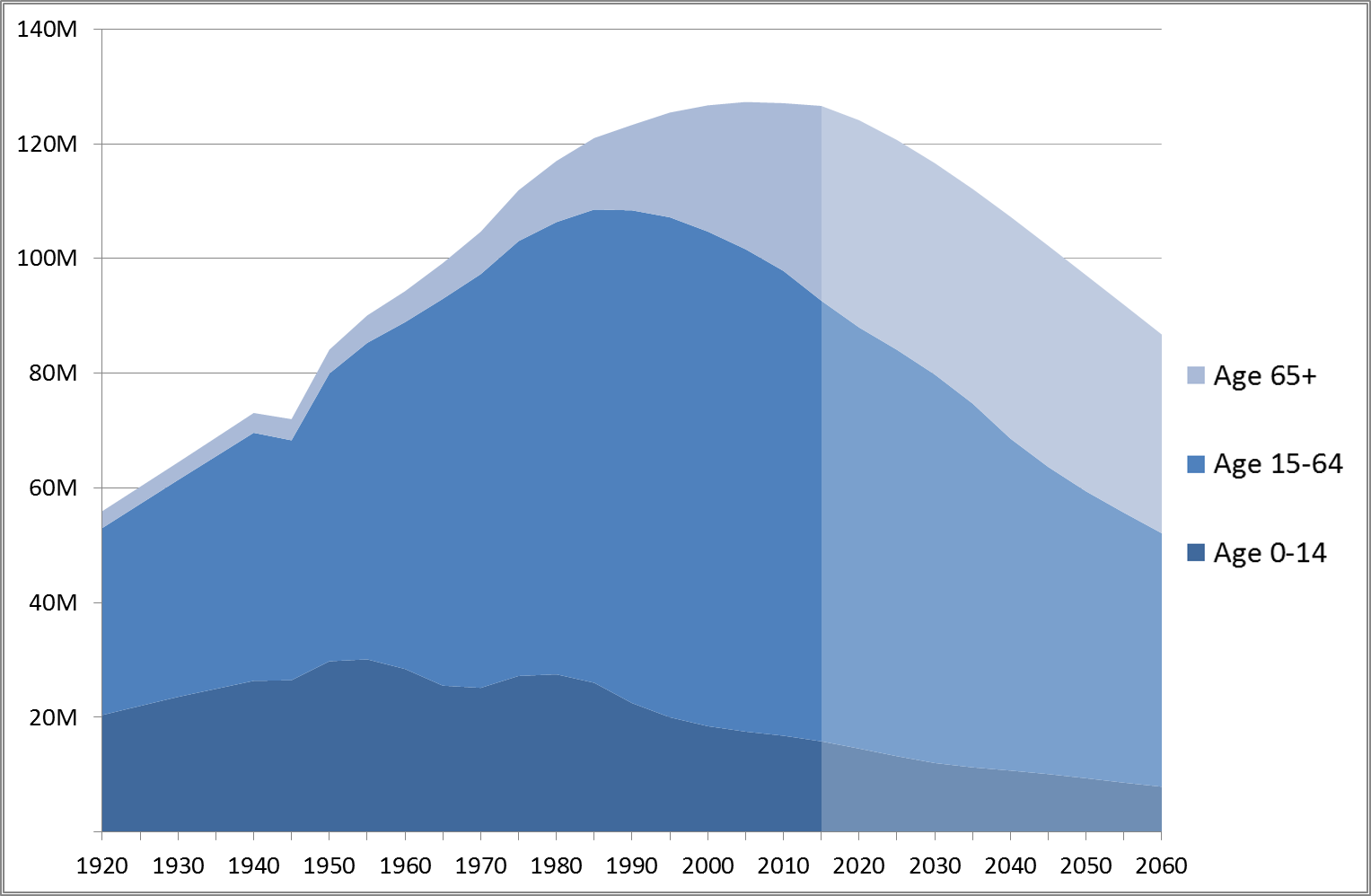
Japan's population in three demographic categories, from 1920 to 2010, with projections to 2060

Japan has the highest proportion of people aged 65 and over among the 38 countries compared in the Statistics Bureau of Japan's 2025 report. That year, the population aged 65 and over was estimated at 36.19 million, or 29.4% of the total population. Population aging in Japan preceded similar trends in other countries, such as South Korea and China.

The ageing of Japanese society, characterized by sub-replacement fertility rates and high life expectancy, is expected to continue. Japan had a post-war baby boom between 1947 and 1949, followed by a prolonged period of low fertility. These trends resulted in the decline of Japan's population after reaching a peak of 128.1 million in October 2008. In 2014, Japan's population was estimated to be 127 million. This figure is expected to shrink to 107 million (by 16%) by 2040 and to 97 million (by 24%) by 2050 if this current demographic trend continues. A 2020 global analysis found that Japan was one of 23 countries that could see a total population decline of 50% or more by 2100. These trends have led some researchers to claim that Japan is transforming into a "super-ageing" society in both rural and urban areas.

Japanese citizens largely view Japan as comfortable and modern, with no widespread sense of a "population crisis". The Japanese government has responded to concerns about the stresses demographic changes place on the economy and social services with policies intended to restore the fertility rate as well as increase the activity of the elderly in society.

== Ageing dynamics ==
Japan's demographic transition 1888-2019

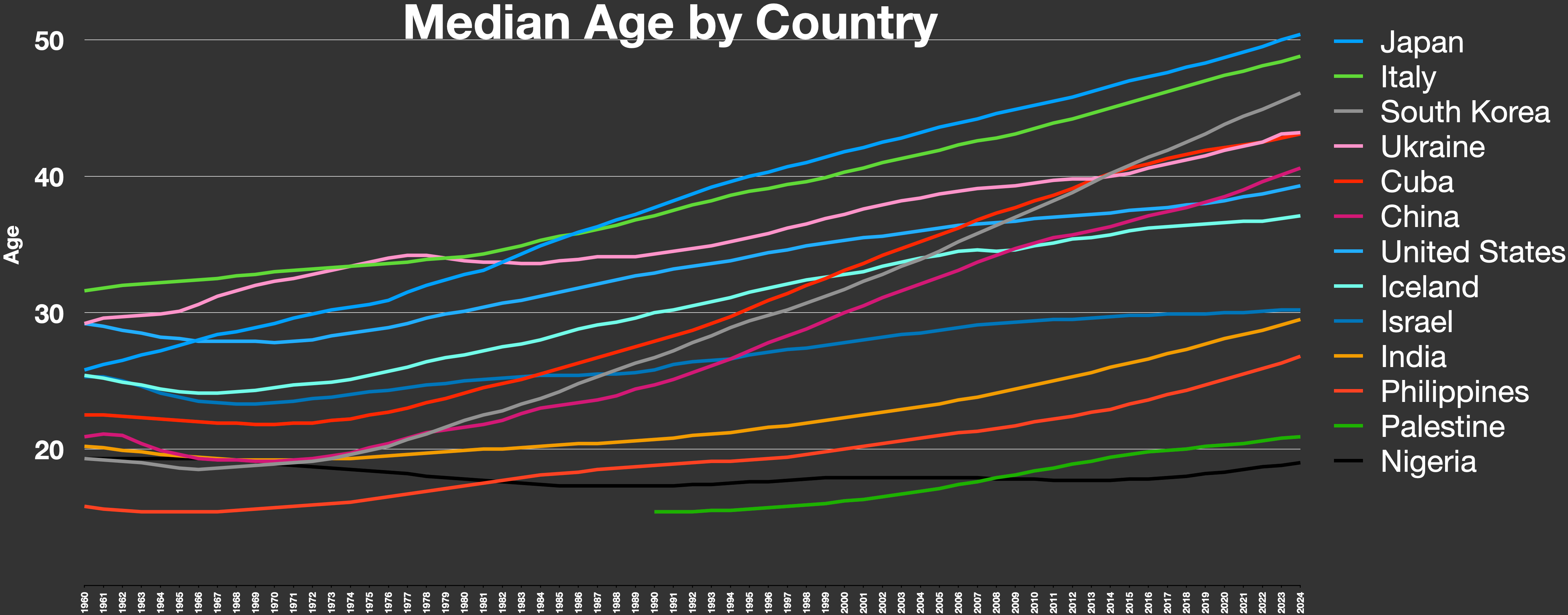
Median age by country

From 1974 to 2014, the number of Japanese people 65 years or older nearly quadrupled, accounting for 26% of Japan's population at 33 million individuals. In the same period, the proportion of children aged 14 and younger decreased from 24.3% in 1975 to 12.8% in 2014. The number of elderly people surpassed the number of children in 1997. Sales of adult diapers surpassed diapers for babies in 2014. This change in the demographic makeup of Japanese society, referred to as population ageing (kōreikashakai, 高齢化社会), has taken place in a shorter period of time than in any other country.

According to population projections based on the current fertility rate, individuals over the age of 65 will account for 40% of the population by 2060, and the total population will fall by one-third from 128 million in 2010 to 87 million by 2060. The proportion of old Japanese citizens will soon level off. However, due to stagnant birth rates, it is estimated that the proportion of young people (under the age of 20) in Japan will constitute only 13 percent in the year 2060, decreasing from 40 percent in 1960.

Economists at Tohoku University established a countdown to national extinction, which projects that Japan will have only one remaining child in 4205. These predictions prompted a pledge by Prime Minister Shinzō Abe to set a threshold for population decline at 100 million.

In September 2026, the health ministry reported Japan had 107,677 people with 100 years old or older, the first time the country surpassed 100,000 people—with 94,298 as being women—since the beginning of the records in 1963, when the country enacted the Act on Social Welfare for the Elderly—with 153 in that year—, and a increase of 7,914 from the previous year. The population in such age range has reached a historic record for 56 consecutive years. Previous figures exceeded 1,000 in 1981, 10,000 in 1998, 50,000 in 2012 and 95,000 in 2024. Health Minister Kenichiro Ueno highlighted the fact that these people are living longer, healthier and more actively, citing advances in medicine and technology.

== Causes ==
Japan's birth and death rates, The drop in 1966 was due to it being a hinoe uma: a year which is viewed as ill-omened in the Japanese Zodiac.

=== High life expectancy ===
Japan's life expectancy was 85.1 years in 2016: 81.7 years for males and 88.5 years for females. As Japan's overall population shrinks due to low fertility rates, the proportion of the elderly increases.

Life expectancy at birth increased rapidly from the end of World War II — when the average life expectancy was 54 years for women and 50 for men — and the percentage of the population aged 65 years and older has increased steadily since the 1950s. Japan is a well-known example, with close to 30 percent of its population aged 65 years or older. The increase in life expectancy translated into a depressed mortality rate until the 1980s, but mortality has increased again to a historic high, since 1950, of 10.1 per 1000 people in 2013.

Factors such as improved nutrition, advanced medical and pharmacological technologies, and improved living conditions have all contributed to the longer-than-average life expectancy. Peace and prosperity following World War II were integral to the massive economic growth of post-war Japan, contributing further to the population's longevity. The proportion of healthcare spending has also dramatically increased as Japan's older population spends more time in hospitals and visiting physicians. On any given day in 2011, 2.9% of people aged 75–79 were in a hospital, and 13.4% were visiting a physician.

=== Low fertility rate ===
Total fertility rate and births of Japan

The percentage of births to unmarried women in selected countries, 1980 and 2007. As can be seen in the figure, Japan has not followed the trend of Western countries of children born outside of marriage to the same degree.

Japan's total fertility rate, or TFR, the number of children born from each woman in her lifetime, has remained below the replacement threshold of 2.1 since 1974, and reached a historic low of 1.26 in 2005. In 2016, the TFR was 1.41 children born per woman. Experts believe that signs of a slight recovery reflect the expiration of a "tempo effect," arising from a shift in the timing of children being born rather than any positive change.

=== Economy and culture ===
A range of economic and cultural factors contributed to the decline in childbirth during the late 20th century: later and fewer marriages, higher education, urbanization, increase in nuclear family households (rather than the extended family), poor work-life balance, increased participation of women in the workforce, a decline in wages and lifetime employment, small living spaces and the high cost of raising a child.

Many young people face economic insecurity due to a lack of regular employment. About 40% of Japan's labor force is non-regular, including part-time and temporary workers. Non-regular employees earn about 53 percent less than regular ones on a comparable monthly basis, according to the Labor Ministry. Young men in this group are less likely to consider marriage or to be married. Many young Japanese people also report that fatigue from overwork hinders their motivation to pursue romantic relationships.

Although most married couples have two or more children, a growing number of young people postpone or entirely reject marriage and parenthood. Conservative gender roles often mean that women are expected to stay home with the children rather than work. Between 1980 and 2010, the percentage of the population who had never married increased from 22% to almost 30%, even as the population continued to age, and by 2035 one in four men will not marry during their prime parenthood years. The Japanese sociologist Masahiro Yamada coined the term parasite singles (パラサイトシングル, parasaito shinguru) for unmarried women in their late 20s and 30s who continue to live with their parents.

A government survey released in June 2022 said that among singles, 46.4% desired to get married, while around a quarter explicitly preferred to remain single (26.5% of men and 25.4% of women). Common reasons for forgoing marriage include the loss of freedom, financial burden, and housework. Hitherto unmarried women cited the burden of housework, childcare and nursing care as major reasons, with men citing financial and job instability. Some women also stated a desire not to change their surname.

=== Virginity and abstinence rates ===
In 2015, 1 in 10 Japanese adults in their 30s reported having had no heterosexual sexual experiences. After accounting for people who may have had same-sex intercourse, researchers estimated that around 5 percent of people lack any sexual experience whatsoever. The percentage of 18 to 39-year-old women without sexual experience was 24.6% in 2015, an increase from 21.7% in 1992. Likewise, the percentage of 18 to 39-year-old men without sexual experience was 25.8% in 2015, an increase from 20% in 1992. Men with stable jobs and a high income were found to be more likely to have sex, while low-income men were 10 to 20 times more likely to have had no sex experience. Conversely, women with lower income were more likely to have had intercourse. (Note: The data on sexual experience is only for heterosexual intercourse; the study did not collect data on homosexual experience.) Men who are unemployed are eight times more likely to be virgins, and men who are part-time or temporary employed had a four times higher virginity rate.

According to a 2010 survey, 61% of single Japanese men in their 20s, and 70% of single Japanese men in their 30s, call themselves "herbivore men" (sōshoku danshi), meaning that they are not interested in getting married or having a girlfriend.

A 2022 survey by the Japanese Cabinet Office found that around 40% of unmarried Japanese men in their 20s have never been on a date. By comparison, 25% of young adult women said they never dated. It is estimated that 5% of married men and women who have had zero dating partners have used konkatsu (short for kekkon katsudo, or marriage hunting, a series of strategies and events similar to finding employment) services to find a spouse.

== Effects ==
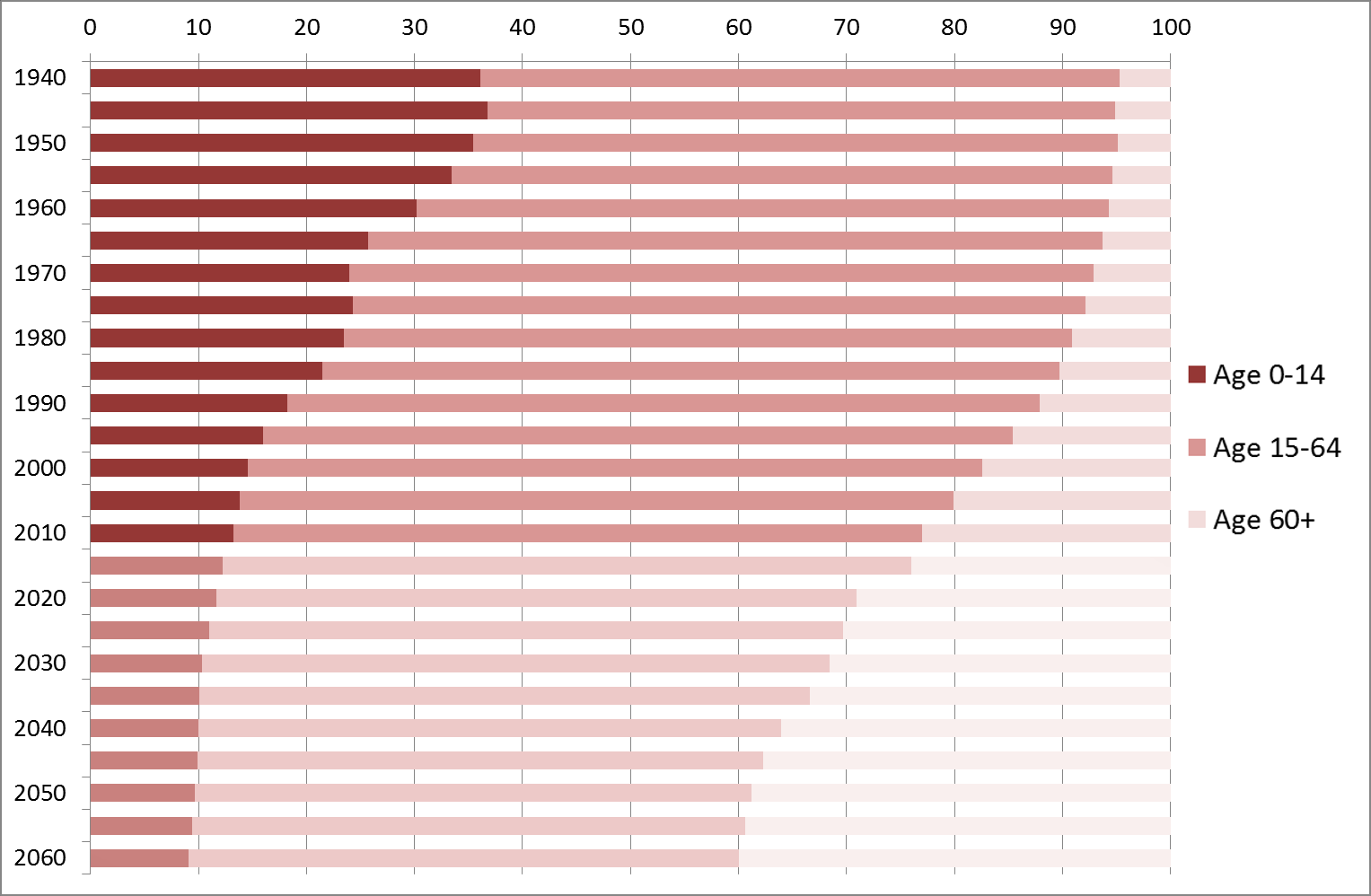
Japan's demographic age composition from 1940 to 2010, with projections out to 2060

Demographic trends are altering relations within and across generations, creating new government responsibilities and changing many aspects of Japanese social life. The aging and decline of the working-age population has triggered concerns about the future of the nation's workforce, potential economic growth, and the solvency of the national pension and healthcare services.

=== Social ===
A smaller population could make the country's crowded metropolitan areas more livable, and the stagnation of economic output might still benefit a shrinking workforce. However, low birth rates and high life expectancy have also inverted the standard population pyramid, forcing a narrowing base of young people to provide and care for a bulging older cohort, even as they try to form families of their own. In 2014, the age dependency ratio (the ratio of people over 65 to those aged 15–65, indicating the ratio of the dependent elderly population to those of working age) was 40%. This is expected to increase to 60% by 2036 and to nearly 80% by 2060. Historical research proposes that concerns about population balance are not new because of practices of infanticide. These practices were used during periods of economic strain to keep family size constant and make sure resources lasted. The earlier forms of population control were shaped by rural hardship and differ with the present situation of declining birth rates in Japan.

The prevalence of dementia in OECD countries, per 1,000 population, 2021

Elderly Japanese have traditionally entrusted themselves with the care of their adult children, and government policies still encourage the creation of sansedai kazoku (三世代家族; "three-generation households"), where a married couple cares for both children and parents. In 2015, 177,600 people between the ages of 15 and 29 were caring directly for an older family member. In the 2022 Comprehensive Survey of Living Conditions, among principal caregivers living with the person requiring long-term care, the share aged under 40 was 1.3% for men and 1.6% for women. A 2024 research-group report estimated that in 2022, 4.432 million people aged 65 or older had dementia (12.3% of that age group) and 5.585 million had mild cognitive impairment (15.5%). Assuming the age- and sex-specific rates measured in 2022 remained constant, it projected 5.842 million older people with dementia and 6.128 million with mild cognitive impairment in 2040. In the 2025 survey, dementia was the most frequently reported primary cause of needing long-term care (23.6%), followed by fractures or falls (14.8%) and frailty associated with old age (14.5%). However, the migration of young people into Japan's major cities, the entrance of women into the workforce, and the increasing cost of care for both young and old dependents have required new solutions, including nursing homes, adult daycare centers, and home health programs. Every year, Japan closes 400 primary and secondary schools, converting some of them to care centers for the elderly.

In 2008, it was recorded that there were approximately 6,000 special nursing homes available that cared for 420,000 Japanese elders. With many nursing homes in Japan, the demand for more caregivers is high. Nonetheless, family caregivers are preferred in Japan as the main caregiver, and it is predicted that Japanese elderly people can perform activities of daily living (ADLs) with fewer assistance and live longer if their main caregiver is related to them.

Many elderly people live alone and isolated. Every year, thousands of deaths go unnoticed for days or even weeks, a modern phenomenon known as kodoku-shi (孤独死; "solitary death"). In 2025, the National Police Agency recorded 76,941 people who lived alone and died at home; 58,919 (76.6%) were aged 65 or older. Of those aged 65 or older, 4,699 were found 31 days or more after death, including 118 after at least a year.

The disposable income in Japan's older population has increased business in biomedical technologies research in cosmetics and regenerative medicine.

=== Political ===
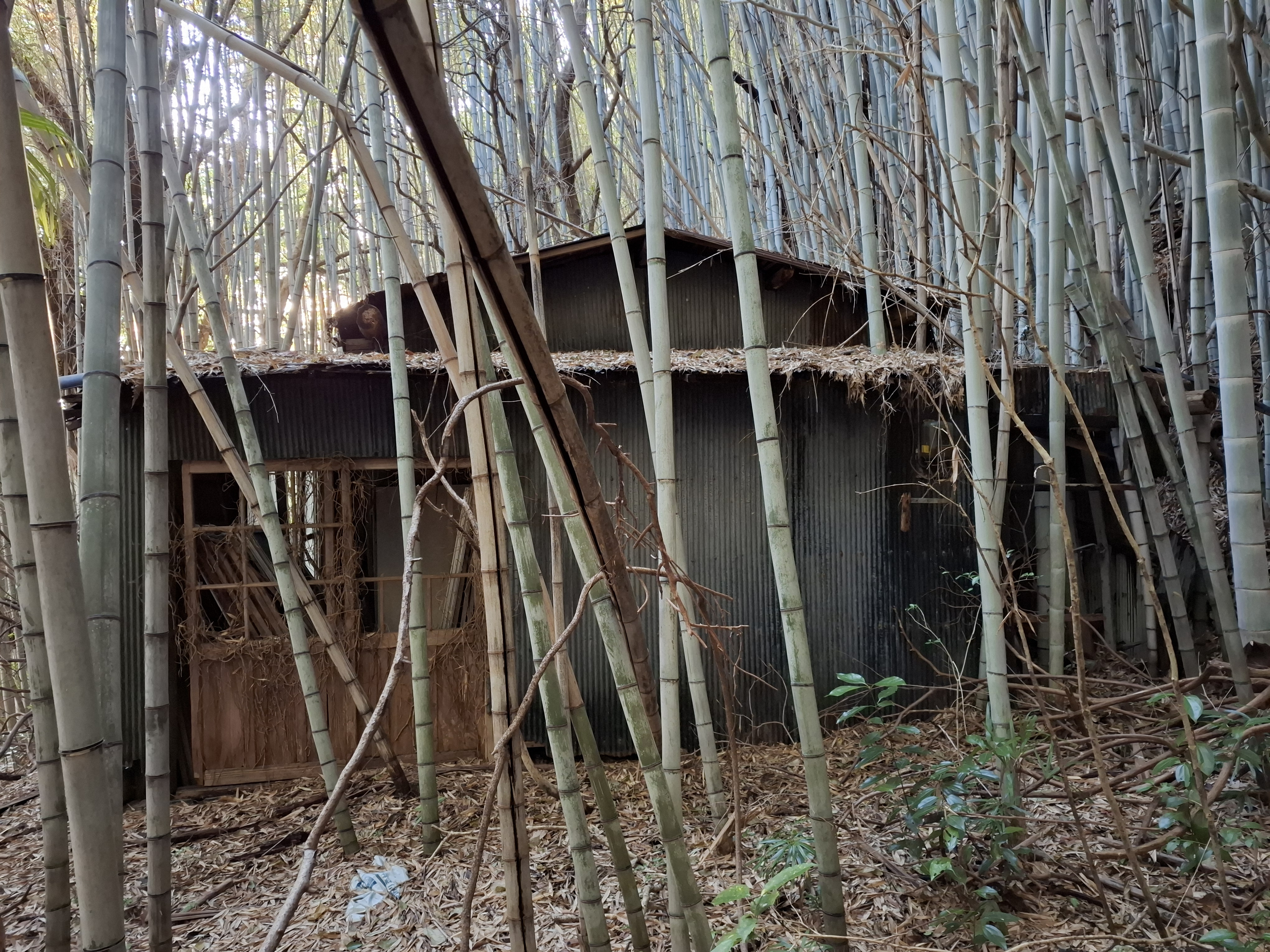
An abandoned house in Yamaguchi Prefecture, which is heavily affected by population decline and rural flight

The Greater Tokyo Area is virtually the only locality in Japan to see population growth, mostly due to internal migration from other parts of the country. Between 2005 and 2010, the population of 36 of Japan's 47 prefectures shrank by as much as 5%. Many rural and suburban areas are struggling with an epidemic of abandoned homes, 8 million across Japan in 2015. Masuda Hiroya, a former Minister for Internal Affairs and Communications who heads the private think tank Japan Policy Council, estimated that about half the municipalities in Japan could disappear between now and 2040 due to the migration of young people, especially young women, from rural areas into Tokyo, Osaka, and Nagoya, where around half of Japan's population is currently concentrated. The government is establishing a regional revitalization task force and focusing on developing regional hub cities, especially Sapporo, Sendai, Hiroshima and Fukuoka.

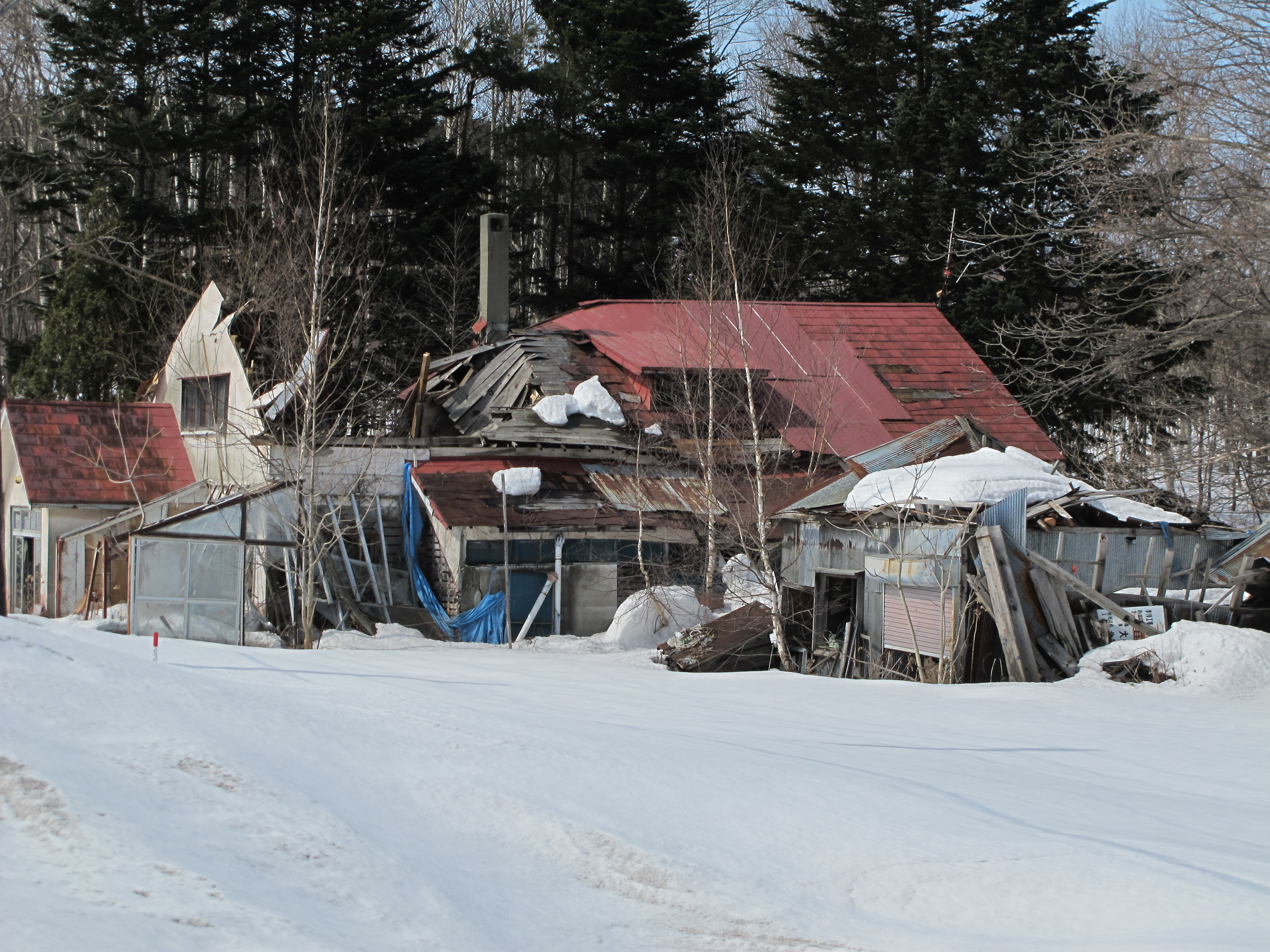
An abandoned house in Yubari district, Hokkaido, an area which has seen population decline

Internal migration and population decline have created a severe regional imbalance in electoral power, where the weight of a single vote depends on where it was cast. Some depopulated districts send three times as many representatives per voter to the National Diet as their growing urban counterparts. In 2014, the Supreme Court of Japan declared that the disparities in voting power violates the Constitution, but the ruling Liberal Democratic Party, which relies on rural and older voters, has been slow to make the necessary realignment.

Social benefits for the elderly in Japan, 2022

The increasing proportion of elderly people has a major impact on government spending and policies. As recently as the early 1970s, the cost of public pensions, healthcare, and welfare services for the aged amounted to only about 6% of Japan's national income. In 1992, that figure increased to 18%, and it is expected to increase to 28% in 2025. Healthcare and pension systems are also expected to come under severe strain. In the mid-1980s, the government began to re-evaluate the relative burdens of government and the private sector in health care and pensions, and it established policies to control government costs in these programs.

The large share of elderly, inflation-averse voters may hinder the political attractiveness of higher inflation, consistent with empirical evidence that aging leads to lower inflation. Japan's aging is a major factor in the nation bearing one of the highest public debts in the world at 246.14% of its GDP. The aging and shrinking population has also created serious recruitment challenges for the Japan Self-Defense Forces.

=== Economic ===
The real GDP growth rate in Japan, 1961 to 2022

From the 1980s onwards, there has been an increase in older-age workers and a shortage of young workers in Japan's workforce, owing to factors such as Japanese employment practices and the professional participation of women. The U.S. Census Bureau estimated in 2002 that Japan would experience an 18% decrease of young workers in its workforce and an 8% decrease in its consumer population by 2030. At the end of 2015, there were 125 jobs for every 100 job seekers. In 2024, 9.30 million people aged 65 and over were employed in Japan, a record high and 13.7% of all employed people aged 15 and over.

Japan made a radical change to its healthcare system by introducing long-term-care insurance in 2000. The government has also invested in medical technologies such as regenerative medicines and cell therapy to recruit and retain more of the older population into the workforce. A range of small and medium-sized enterprises (SMEs) have also pioneered new practices for retaining workers beyond mandatory retirement ages, such as through workplace improvements as well as job tasks specifically created for older workers.

Japanese companies increased the mandatory retirement age from 55 to as high as 65 during the 1980s and 1990s, with many firms allowing employees to work beyond the retirement age. The government has gradually increased the age at which pension benefits begin from 60 to 65. Shortfalls in the pension system have driven many people of retirement age to remain in the workforce, with some elderly individuals being driven into poverty.

The retirement age may go even higher in the future if the proportion of the elderly increases. A study by the UN Population Division in 2000 found that Japan would need to raise its retirement age to 77 (or allow net immigration of 17 million by 2050) to maintain its worker-to-retiree ratio. Consistent immigration into Japan may prevent further population decline, and many academics have argued for Japan to develop policies to support large influxes of young immigrants.

Less desirable industries, such as agriculture and construction, face the most severe threats. The average farmer in Japan is 70 years old; while about a third of construction workers are 55 or older, including many expected to retire in the next ten years, only one in ten is younger than 30. The decline in the working population has also caused the nation's military to shrink.

The decline in working-aged cohorts may lead to a shrinking economy if productivity does not increase faster than the rate of Japan's decreasing workforce. The OECD estimates that similar labor shortages in Austria, Germany, Greece, Italy, Spain, and Sweden will depress the European Union's economic growth by 0.4 percentage points annually from 2000 to 2025, after which shortages will cost the EU 0.9 percentage points in growth. In Japan, labor shortages will lower growth by 0.7% annually until 2025, after which Japan will experience an annual 0.9% loss in growth.

== Places with high birthrates ==
=== Nagareyama ===
The city Nagareyama in Chiba Prefecture is 30 kilometers from Tokyo. In the early 2000s, Nagareyama experienced an exodus of young people, due to lack of childcare facilities. In 2003, then-mayor Yoshiharu Izaki made investments in childcare centers a primary focus of the city's spending, developing infrastructure such as a transit service at Nagareyama-centralpark Station where parents can drop off their children on their way to work, following which children are shuttled to day-care centers by buses, driven by local seniors, and a summer camp for children while their parents work during holidays. These initiatives have lured young working parents from Tokyo to Nagareyama. The city's population grew over 20% between 2006 and 2019, with many parents listing childcare as one of the main reasons of the move. 85% of families in the city have more than one child, and young children are expected to outnumber the elderly in the near future.

=== Matsudo and Akashi ===
Matsudo city in Chiba has had a population increase of 3.1% since 2015. The increase is said to arise from day-care centers near or inside train stations, which are without waiting lists, and co-working spaces that include childcare rooms.

The population of Akashi in Hyōgo grew 3.6%. This is attributed to a childcare facility with a large indoor playground near the local JR train station built in 2017. A subscription service in the region also includes free deliveries of infant necessities, such as diapers.

=== West Japan ===
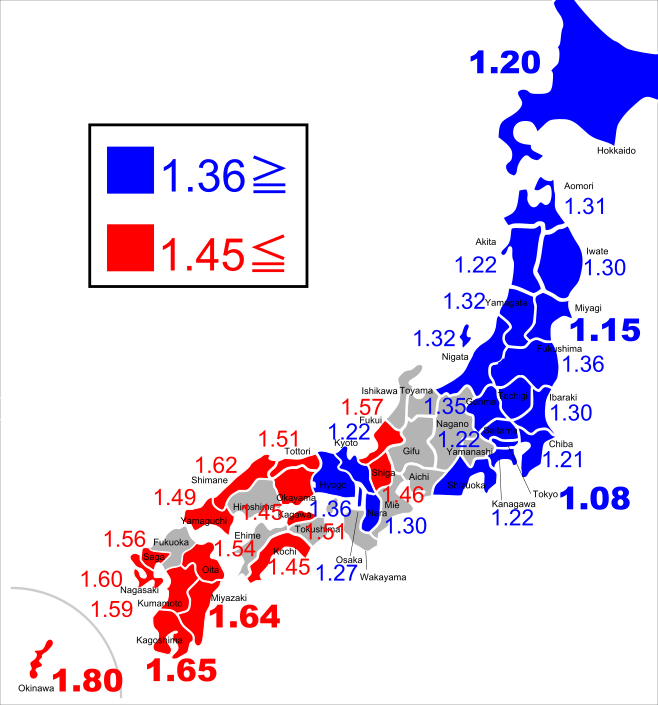
Japanese prefectures by total fertility rate (TFR), 2021

Western Japan (Kyushu, Chūgoku region, and Shikoku) has a higher birth rate than Central and Eastern Japan. 13 of the 15 prefectures with a TFR of 1.45 or higher are all located in the Kyushu, Chugoku regions or Shikoku, with the other two prefectures being Fukui and Saga. Prefectures with a low TFR are concentrated in eastern or northern Japan.

==== Okinawa Prefecture ====
Okinawa prefecture has had the highest birth rate in Japan for over 40 years since recording began in 1899. In 2018, the prefecture was the only one with a natural population increase, with 15,732 births and 12,157 deaths. While the national average fertility rate that year was 1.42, with Tokyo having the lowest rate of 1.20, Okinawa had a rate of 1.89. The average age of marriage is lower in Okinawa, at 30 years for men and 28.8 years for women; the national average is 31.1 years for men and 29.4 years for women.

Reasons for families tending to have more than two children include Okinawan social norms, cheaper costs of living, as well as lower stress, and competition education levels, despite Okinawa having less welfare for children compared to other regions in Japan. The Okinawan culture also emphasises a form of mutual aid called yuimaru, with relatives living close together to help family members with childrearing. Okinawa also has increasing numbers of ikumen; fathers who are actively involved in parenting.

== Government policies ==
The Japanese government has developed policies to encourage fertility and retain more of its population, especially women and the elderly, in the workforce. Incentives for family formation include expanded childcare avenues, new benefits for those who have children, and a state-sponsored dating service. Policies focused on engaging more women in the workplace include longer maternity leave and legal protections against pregnancy discrimination, known in Japan as matahara (マタハラ; maternity harassment). However, "Womenomics", the set of policies intended to bring more women into the workplace as part of Prime Minister Shinzō Abe's economic recovery plan, has struggled to overcome cultural barriers and entrenched stereotypes.

These policies could prove useful for bringing women back into the workforce after having children, but academics have noted that they can also merely encourage productivity among women who opt not to have children. The Japanese government has introduced other policies to address the growing elderly population as well, especially in rural areas, where the government has tried to improve welfare services such as long-term care facilities and other services that can help families at homes, such as daycare or in-home nursing assistance. The Gold Plan was introduced in 1990 to improve these services and has attempted to reduce the burden of care placed on families; long-term care insurance was introduced in 2000.

On June 13, 2023, Kishida's cabinet determined the implementation of the "Strategic Policy for Children's Future" at a meeting in order to implement countermeasures against the declining birthrate under a different angle. Kishida's government intends to establish the "All Children's Daycare System (tentative name), to be carried out through 2024. This system will allow fathers to flexibly take vacational leaves that can be used flexibly on hourly bases, regardless of working conditions. The aim is to have this system in full-scale implementation in 2025. In addition, child allowances will be raised: The allowance for the first and second children will be 15,000 yen per month for those between the ages of 0 and 3, and 10,000 yen per month for those between the ages of 3 and high school age. For the third and subsequent children, the monthly amount will be 30,000 yen for all children from age 0 to high school age.

=== Immigration ===
A net decline in population due to a historically low birth rate has raised the issue of immigration as a way to compensate for labor shortages. Professor Noriko Tsuya, of Keio University, states that it is not realistic to combat Japan's low birthrate with the increase of immigration. The government should keep working to further help women and couples balance their work and family roles in order to boost fertility. While public opinion polls tend to show low support for immigration, most people support an expansion in working-age migrants on a temporary basis to maintain Japan's economic status. Comparative reviews show that Japanese attitudes are broadly neutral and place Japanese acceptance of migrants in the middle of developed countries.

Japan's government is also trying to increase tourism rates, which helps their economy. The government has also expanded options available for international students, allowing them to begin work and potentially stay in Japan to help the economy. Existing initiatives such as the JET Program encourage English-speaking people from across the world to work in Japan as English language teachers.

Japan is strict when accepting refugees into their country. Only 27 out of 7,500 refugee applicants were accepted into Japan in 2015. However, Japan provides high levels of foreign and humanitarian aid. In 2016, there was a 44% increase in asylum seekers to Japan from Indonesia, Nepal, and the Philippines. Since Japan does not generally permit low-skilled workers to enter, many people went through the asylum route instead. This allowed immigrants to apply for asylum and begin work six months after the application. However, it did not allow foreigners without valid visas to apply for work.

=== Work-life balance ===
Japan has expanded its policies on work-life balance with the goal of improving conditions that may lead to a higher birth rate, with the passing of the Child Care and Family Care Leave Law, which took effect in June 2010. The law provides parents the opportunity to take up to one year of leave after the birth of a child, with the possibility of extending the leave for another six months if the child is not accepted to a nursery school. It also allows employees with preschool-age children to take up to five days of leave in the event of a child's injury or sickness; limits on the amount of overtime in excess of 24 hours per month based on an employee's request; limits on working late at night based on an employee's request; and opportunities for shorter working hours and flex time for employees. Even with these measures in place, many workers still face pressure to prioritize their jobs over family life. Taking full advantage of these benefits is difficult because employees worry about how it will affect their careers or how coworkers will view them. This gap between policy and everyday workplace expectations has made it harder for these reforms to fully change people’s decisions about marriage and having children.

The laws stated aims were to, in the following decade, increase the female employment rate from 65% to 72%, decrease the percentage of employees working 60 hours or more per week from 11% to 6%, increase the rate of use of annual paid leave from 47% to 100%, increase the rate of child care leave from 72% to 80% for females and .6% to 10% for men, and increase the hours spent by men on childcare and housework in households with a child under six years of age from 1 hour to 2.5 hours a day.

== Comparisons with other countries ==
Japan's population is aging faster than any other country on the planet. The population of those 65 years or older roughly doubled in 24 years, from 7.1% of the population in 1970 to 14.1% in 1994. The same increase took 61 years in Italy, 85 years in Sweden, and 115 years in France. Life expectancy for women in Japan is 87 years, five years more than that of the U.S. Men in Japan have a life expectancy of 81 years, four years more than that of the U.S. Japan has more centenarians than any other country, 58,820 in 2014, or 42.76% per 100,000 people. Almost one in five of the world's centenarians live in Japan, and 87% of them are women.

In contrast to Japan, a more open immigration policy has allowed Australia, Canada, and the United States to grow their workforce despite low fertility rates. An expansion of immigration is often rejected as a solution to population decline by Japan's political leaders and people for reasons including the fear of foreign crime and a desire to preserve cultural traditions.

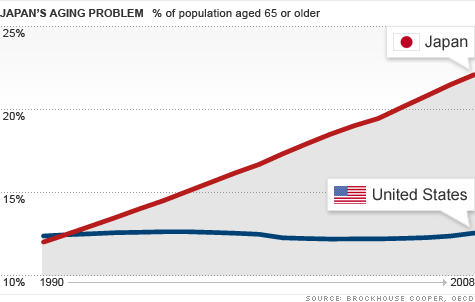
Japan's elderly percentage, in comparison with the U.S., 1990 to 2008

As recently developed nations continue to experience improved health care and lower fertility rates, the growth of the elderly population will continue to rise. In 1970–1975, only 19 countries had a fertility rate that can be considered below-replacement fertility, and there were no countries with exceedingly low fertility (<1.3 children). However, between 2000 and 2005, there were 65 countries with below-replacement fertility, and 17 with exceedingly low fertility.

Historically, European countries have had the largest elderly populations by proportion as they became developed nations earlier, experiencing subsequent drops in fertility rates. However, many Asian and Latin American countries, including Argentina, Brazil, Chile and Mexico, are quickly catching up to this trend. As of 2015, 22 of the 25 oldest countries are located in Europe, but parts of Asia such as South Korea, Hong Kong, and Taiwan are expected to be in the list by 2050. In South Korea, where the fertility rate is the world's lowest (0.81 as of 2022), the population is expected to peak in 2030.

The smaller states of Singapore and Taiwan are also struggling to boost fertility rates from record lows and manage aging populations. China's fertility rate is lower than Japan's and is aging faster than almost every other country in modern history. More than a third of the world's elderly (65 and older) live in East Asia and the Pacific, and many of the economic concerns raised first in Japan can be projected to the rest of the region.

India's population is aging similarly to that of Japan, but with a 50-year lag. A study of the populations of India and Japan for the years 1950 to 2015 combined with median variant population estimates for the years 2016 to 2100 shows that India is 50 years behind Japan on the aging process.

One of the distinguishing features of Japan's elderly population, in particular, is that it is both fast-growing and having one of the highest life expectancies. According to the World Health Organization, Japanese people are able to live 75 years fully healthy and without any disabilities. Demographic data shows that Japan is an older and more quickly aging society than the United States.

== See also ==
- Children's Day (Japan)
- Demographics of Japan
- Elderly people in Japan
- Marriage in Japan
- Respect for the Aged Day
- Retired husband syndrome

General:

- List of countries and dependencies by population
- List of countries and dependencies by population density
- Generational accounting
- Sub-replacement fertility

International:

- Aging of South Korea
- Aging of China
- Aging of Europe
- Aging of the United States
- Russian Cross
