= Raja Beta syndrome =

Indian cultural term

Raja Beta syndrome is an Indian cultural and psychological term describing a mother's boy raised like an entitled king who suffers from extreme dependency, emotional immaturity, and a lack of basic life skills. Key behaviors include expecting others to clean up after them, refusing to accept blame, and relying entirely on their mothers or wives for daily care.

== See also ==
- Parasite single
- Attachment theory
- strawberry generation
- Amae
- Mammoni
