= Parasite single =

Pejorative term for an adult living with parents

Parasite single is a pejorative term for a person older than early adulthood still living with their parents at their parents' house, remaining financially dependent and avoiding the traditional adult lifestyle of marriage and children. The term is not synonymous with hikikomori, recluse shut-ins. Financial insecurity and lack of affordable housing are among the causes.

Masahiro Yamada, a Tokyo Gakugei University and Chuo University sociologist and Tokyo University graduate, coined the term in a newspaper article published in February 1997. In its earliest uses in book publications, the term was used in Parasaito Shinguru (パラサイトシングル) by Sarada Tamako published by Wave Shuppan in 1998, and Parasaito shinguru no jidai (パラサイト・シングルの時代) published in 1999 by Chikuma Shobō. Japanese in origin, the term has been used in other countries including South Korea.

In 2006 more than 13 million parasite singles were estimated to be living in Japan. In 2010 in the 30–34 age group, 47.3% of Japanese men and 34.5% of Japanese women were unmarried. Surveys conducted in 2008 and 2013 by the National Institute of Population and Social Security Research in Japan showed that the number of Japanese men and women reporting to not be in any kind of romantic relationship grew by 10%, but journalists and bloggers cautioned that “celibacy syndrome” is unscientific and based on cherry-picked data. The Statistical Research and Training Institute estimated that in Japan in 2016 there were 4.5 million Japanese aged between 35 and 54 living with their parents.

== See also ==
- Aging of Japan
- Herbivore men
- Hikikomori
- Satori generation
- Shinjinrui
- N-po generation
- Sub-replacement fertility
- mammoni
- Boomerang Generation
