= Elderly people in Japan =

This article focuses on the situation of elderly people in Japan and the recent changes in society.

Japan's population is aging. During the 1950s, the percentage of the population over age 65 remained steady at around 5%. Later the figure increased, and by 1989 it was 11.6%. At the time, it was projected to reach 16.9% by 2000 and almost 25.2% by 2020; as of 2025, 36.142 million people in Japan were aged 65 or older (29.4% of the population), including 21.169 million aged 75 or older (17.2%). Perhaps the most outstanding feature of this trend was its speed, in comparison to other industrialised nations. In the United States, expansion of the 65-and-over age group from 7% to 14% took 75 years; in the United Kingdom and Germany, it took 45 years. The same expansion in Japan took only 24.5 years, passing 7% in late 1970 and 14% in early 1995.

The proportion of people aged 65 or older living alone rose between 1980 and 2020, from 4.3% to 15.0% among men and from 11.2% to 22.1% among women. The Cabinet Office projects that these proportions will reach 26.1% and 29.3%, respectively, by 2050.

== Age stratification and the elderly ==
Old age ideally represents a time of relaxation of social obligations, assisting with the family farm or business without carrying the main responsibility, socialising, and receiving respectful care from family and esteem from the community. In the late 1980s, high (although declining) rates of suicide among older people and the continued existence of temples where one could pray for quick death indicated that this ideal was not always fulfilled. Japan has a national holiday called Respect for the Aged Day, but for many people it is merely another holiday. Buses and trains carry signs above especially reserved seats to remind people to give up their seats for elderly riders. Many older Japanese continued to live full lives that included gainful employment and close relationships with adult children.

Although the standard retirement age in Japan throughout most of the postwar period was 55, people aged 65 and over in Japan were more likely to work than in any other developed country in the 1980s. In 1987 about 36% of men and 15% of women in this age-group were in the labor force. With better pension benefits and decreased opportunities for agricultural or other self-employed work, however, labor force participation by the elderly has been decreasing since 1960. In 1986 about 90% of Japanese surveyed said that they wished to continue working after age 65. They indicated both financial and health reasons for this choice. Other factors, such as a strong work ethic and the centering of men's social ties around the workplace, may also be relevant. Employment was not always available, however, and men and women who worked after retirement usually took substantial cuts in salary and prestige. Between 1981 and 1986, the proportion of people 60 and over who reported that a public pension was their major source of income increased from 35% to 53%, while those relying most on earnings for income fell from 31 to 25% and those relying on children decreased from 16 to 9%.

In the late twentieth century, there has been a trend toward a nuclear family instead of a three-generation household that leaves the elderly, who are accustomed to different values and who expected to live with their son's family during old age, by themselves. The proportion living with children decreased from 77% in 1970 to 65% in 1985, although this rate was still much higher than in other industrialised countries. The number of elderly living in Japan's retirement or nursing homes also increased from around 75,000 in 1970 to more than 216,000 in 1987.

But still, this group was a small portion of the total elderly population. People living alone or only with spouses constituted 32% of the 65-and-over group. Less than half of those responding to a government survey believed that it was the duty of the eldest son to care for parents, but 63% replied that it was natural for children to take care of their elderly parents. The motive of co-residence seems to have changed, from being the expected arrangement of an agricultural society to being an option for coping with circumstances such as illness or widowhood in a post-industrial society.

The health of the aged receives a great deal of the society's attention. Responsibility for the care of the aged, bedridden, or senile, however, still devolves mainly on family members, usually daughters-in-law.

== Aging and the elderly ==
While Japan focuses its policy makers and medical experts to figure out how to deal best with the shrinking population, the decreasing workforce, and the raising costs for elder care, the voices of the elders themselves are rarely heard.

Not only do many elders wish to stay in the workforce to fight off psychological and physical health problems, they are motivated to participate in societal activities or have hobbies, leisure activities and "ikigai" - which roughly means "purpose of life" - to avoid their worst fears of becoming a burden to their families. Keeping themselves busy and productive, elders take part in voluntary work in civil society organizations and community projects, while there are some who join overseas development projects under the auspices of the Japan Overseas Volunteer Corps. Asides from physical activities, mental practices are also encouraged, such as reading out loud, which is considered to be beneficial to keep up one's concentration capability and is more challenging than just reading silently. The active elder population also gives way to a growing consumer market ranging from leisure and education to healthcare and housing.

An innovative take on the super-aging society of Japan called REPRINTS, Research of Productivity by Intergenerational Sympathy, was launched in Tokyo Metropolitan area, which has a 20.47 percent of people over 65 (below the country's average) in 2004 (Tokyo Statistical Yearbook, 2013, p. 53). This project was started by a research team for Social Participation and Health Promotion of Tokyo Metropolitan Institute of Gerontology (TMIG), and later was sponsored by the Ministry of Health, Welfare and Labor. The team was motivated to bring "active participation in society by senior citizens" in Tokyo, while studying "how intergenerational exchange between senior volunteers and children affect each other and what outcome it produces" (Research of Productivity by Intergenerational Sympathy, 2013). After completion of three-week training workshop, volunteers visited public elementary schools and kindergartens and sometimes even senior high schools depending on demand for picture book reading sessions. The elders can decide the appropriate type of book for the respective age group they are going to read to, or sometimes, they can read old stories such as ancient Japanese myths or legends they enjoyed during their childhood. This encourages the older generations to pursue intellectual activities while transferring wisdom and contributing to the growth of the younger generations. Although the REPRINTS network relies heavily on demand of the schools and the initiative of the volunteers, the experience created has major impacts on both the young generation and the elderly themselves. While the students are having a refreshing change to their ordinary school day with exciting cultural stories, beneficial improvements in health were found among elders who volunteered intensively. Overall, the REPRINTS network has intergenerational activities that can be easily adopted and introduced to other communities while including senior citizens, helping them stay active and useful for the community.

This type of voluntary program can be a possible answer to promote society involvement, life fulfillment and healthy activities for the elderly population of Japan.

Also various robots have been developed to cater for increasing number of elderly persons. Examples include robots designed to elicit emotional responses or enhance communication such as robots Paro or Pepper as well as physical assistant robots, mobile servant robots, and person carrier robots. Those robots that are specifically designed to assist elderly people are also known as carebots, and their development has been heavily funded by the Japanese government. In 2024, the Ministry of Economy, Trade and Industry and the Ministry of Health, Labour and Welfare broadened their joint initiative from priority fields for care robots to priority fields for technologies in long-term care, including ICT. The ministries said the change aimed to improve care quality, reduce providers' workload and support older people's independence.

== Aging and retirement of the labor force ==
As Japan's population aged, so did its workforce. In 1990 about 20% of the work force was made up of workers aged 55 and over. The Ministry of Labor predicted that by 2000 about 24% of the working population (almost one in four workers) would be in this age-group. This demographic shift brings about both macroeconomic and microeconomic problems. In 2025, the employment rate was 54.5% among people aged 65–69, 36.2% among those aged 70–74, and 12.6% among those aged 75 or older. At the national level, Japan is having troubles financing the pension system, and the future of the pension system was a major topic in the 2005 House of Representatives election. At the corporate level, problems include growing personnel costs and the shortage of senior positions.

In most Japanese companies, salaries rise with worker age. Because younger workers are paid less, they are more attractive to employers, and the difficulty in finding employment increases with age. This pattern is evidenced by the unemployment rates for different age-groups and by the number of applicants per job vacancy for each age-group in openings handled by public employment offices. As the Japanese population ages, such trends may grow.

Most Japanese companies require that employees retire upon reaching a specified age. During most of the postwar period, that age was 55. Because government social security payments normally begin at age 60, workers are forced to find reemployment to fill the five-year gap. However, in 1986 the Japanese Diet passed a law to provide various incentives for firms to raise their retirement age to 60. Many Japanese companies raised the retirement age they had set, partly in response to this legislation. And despite mandatory retirement policies, many Japanese companies allow their employees to continue working beyond the age of 60, although generally at reduced wages. People over 60 continue to work for varied reasons: to supplement inadequate pension incomes, to give meaning to their lives, or to keep in touch with society. Some companies, specifically small and medium-sized companies (SMEs) have incorporated various adaptations such as making workplaces barrier free, reallocating work tasks, and establishing "elderly-oriented 'improvement systems'" kaizen in order "to ensure the motivation and performance of elderly workers through various adaptations of their work content and environment".

As Japan's population ages, the financial health of the public pension plan deteriorates. To avoid massive increases in premiums, the government reformed the system in 1986 by cutting benefit levels and raising the plan's specified age at which benefits began from 60 to 65. Under the revised system, contributions paid in equal share by employer and employee were expected to be equivalent to about 30% of wages, as opposed to 40% of wages under the old system. However, problems then arose in securing employment opportunities for the 60-to-65 age group.

In 1990 some 90% of companies paid retirement benefits to their employees in the form of lump-sum payments and pensions. Some companies based the payment amount on the employee's base pay, while others used formulas independent of base pay. Because the system was designed to reward long service, payment rose progressively with the number of years worked.

== See also ==
- Aging of Japan
- Demographics of Japan
- Hoarder house
- Respect for the Aged Day
- The Ballad of Narayama (short story)
- Ubasute
