= Mother's boy =

Man who is excessively attached to his mother

Mother's boy is a derogatory term for a man seen as having an unhealthy dependence on his mother at an age at which he is expected to be self-reliant (e.g. live on his own, earn his own money, be married). Use of this phrase is first attested in 1901. The term mama's boy has a connotation of effeminacy and weakness. The counter term, for women, would be a father complex.

In classical Freudian psychoanalytic theory, the term Oedipus complex denotes a child's desire to have sexual relations with the parent of the opposite sex. Sigmund Freud wrote that a child's identification with the same-sex parent is the successful resolution of the Oedipus complex. This theory came into the popular consciousness in America in the 1940s.

== Terminology ==
This is also commonly and informally known as mummy's boy, mommy's boy or mama's boy.

== Psychological explanations ==
=== Psychoanalytic theory ===
The psychoanalytic theory, often referred to as the psychodynamic approach, provides a key psychological explanation for human gender development. 'Gender development' refers to a process in which individuals come to understand and internalise gender-related concepts and roles. It is a gradual formation of cognitive frameworks and internal schemas in relation to gender dynamics amongst society.

In the psychoanalytic theory, Sigmund Freud highlighted the significance of the unconscious mind in shaping human behaviour and personality. This Freudian perspective emerged in the early 1900's, in which he addressed physical traits such as being a "mother's boy" by exploring and resolving conflicts within the internal mind.

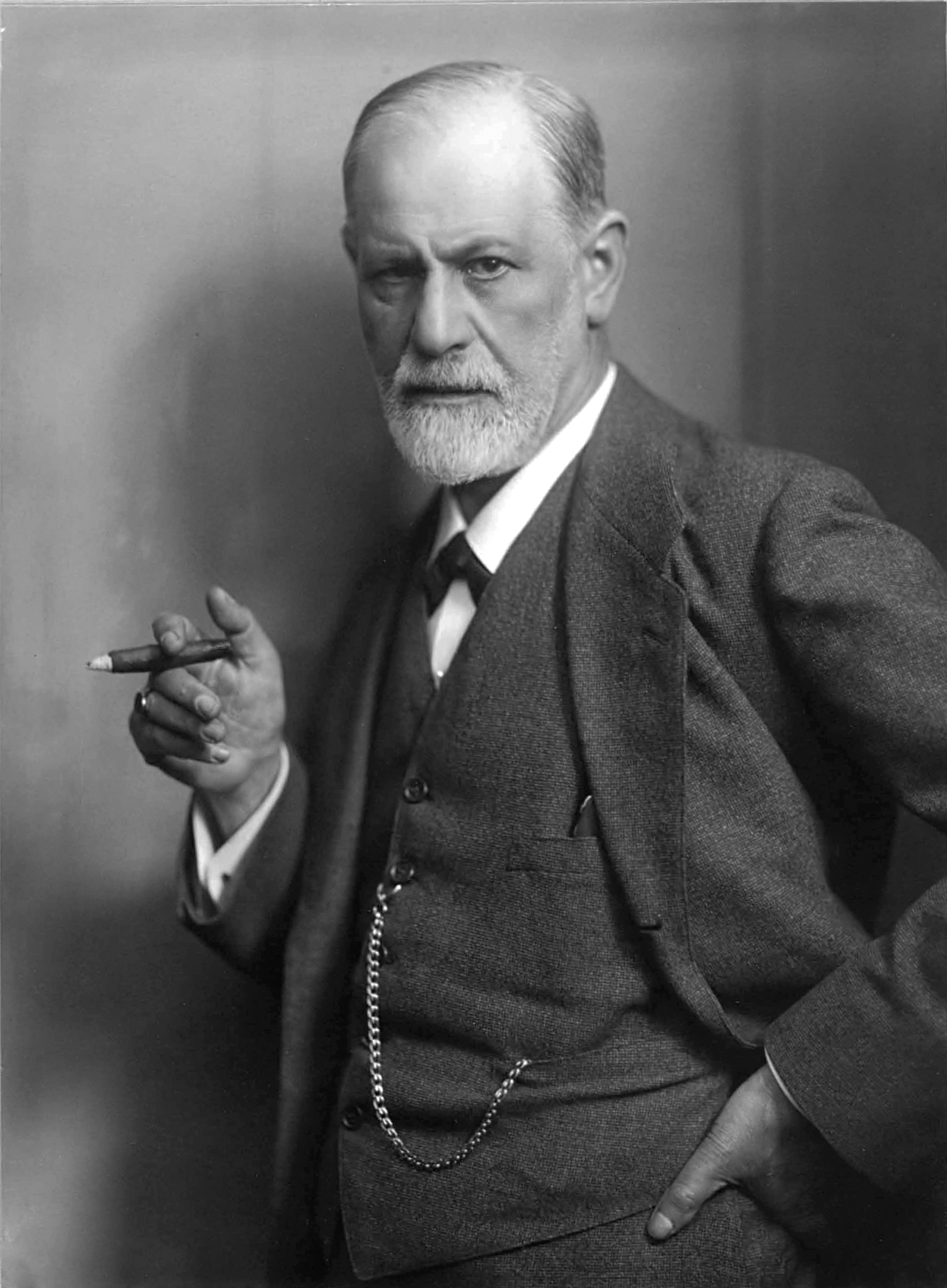
Sigmund Freud photographed by Max Halberstadt.

==== Psychosexual stages ====
Freud proposed that child development occurs in five psychosexual stages, each marked by various conflicts that children must "overcome" in order to successfully progress onto the next. The Oedipus complex/conflict is encountered in the "phallic stage" when children are 3-6 years old as they begin gender development. Prior to the phallic stage, children have no concept nor awareness of gender. This notion is further supported by Kohlberg's theory of gender development.

==== Oedipus complex ====
The Oedipus complex is defined by a boy's unconscious, incestuous feelings toward his mother. This is accompanied by jealousy and hostility toward his father, whom the boy deems as a sexual rival for his mother's affection. However, this desire is tempered by the boy's fear of retaliation from his father, leading to "castration anxiety", when the boy fears he may be castrated by his own father. To resolve and overcome this conflict, the boy typically gives up his love for his mother, and instead begins to identity with his father. This enables him to internalise traits and personalities observed from the same sex parent.

However, if the psychosexual Oedipus conflict remains unresolved, fixation can occur, resulting in the child becoming "stuck" with phallic personality traits into adulthood. These phallic personality traits are depicted by a man's over dependence on his mother, both emotionally and physically. Freud argues this occurrence is particularly noticeable in cases of absent fathers, where the lack of identification and internalisation with the father causes the boy to seek gender identification with the mother instead, thus leading to what modern society calls a "mother's boy".

=== Attachment theory ===
Psychologists John Bowlby and Mary Ainsworth investigated the emotional bond (reciprocity) formed between infants and their mothers. Attachment theory proposes that in the case of "mother's boys", their intense dependency on their primary caregiver (the mother) results in a reluctance to assert independence, heightened anxiety in her absence, and difficulty forming and maintaining relationships beyond the maternal bond upon adulthood.

In Ainsworth's "strange situation" experiment in 1970, she explored the long term implications of various attachment styles for adult functioning. She identified three primary attachment styles in children:

1. Secure attachment
2. Insecure-avoidant attachment
3. Insecure-resistant attachment.

Further studies has indicated that children who develop an insecure attachment style with their mothers especially exhibit difficulties in forming healthy relationships in adulthood. Additionally, psychologist Diana Baumrind identified that parenting styles characterised by overprotection and lack of boundaries may exacerbate an insecure attachment style and intensify "mother's boy" dynamics. Attachment studies therefore highlights the importance of early attachment and parenting styles in shaping individuals' interpersonal behaviour and overall psychological well-being.

== Criticism and controversies ==
The term "mother's boy" is not without its criticisms and controversies due to its potential to stigmatise males who maintain a close relationship with their mothers. It may enforce existing gender stereotypes that men should be strong and not emotionally reliant on their mothers, which could invalidate their emotional bonds with mothers.

The Freudian psychoanalytic theory, from which the term "mother's boy" stems, can be largely criticised in contemporary psychology. Critics argue the theory's speculative nature and reliance on clinical observations lack empirical evidence and scientific rigour. As his methodology was largely grounded in case studies of the unconscious mind, his findings also lack falsifiability. Moreover, Freud's work only reflects the cultural and historical context of late 19th century Vienna, leading to concerns about cultural relativism and ethnocentrism.

Similar limitations can also be identified in Mary Ainsworth's attachment theory in 1970. Her "strange situation" study has been criticised for its ethnocentric bias and lack of universality. Meta-analyses following Ainsworth's research, such as the study by Van IJ & K highlighted cultural differences in attachment types, with insecure attachment being more prevalent in collectivist Asian cultures (Japan, China, India) in comparison to the Western individualistic cultures (Germany, UK, USA).

== Cultural and media depictions ==
The term "mother's boy" is perceived differently across cultures and media representations due to varying cultural attitudes towards masculinity and gender roles of males in society.

The term "mother's boy" carries negative connotations in Western cultures. By contrast, Asian cultures, including those in countries like India, Pakistan, and China, often place a strong emphasis on family values and filial piety (the virtue of showing respect for one's parents and elders). Sons are traditionally expected to show respect and obedience to their mothers as a sign of familial honour due to the mother's traditional gender role of being a homemaker.

=== Notable examples in media ===
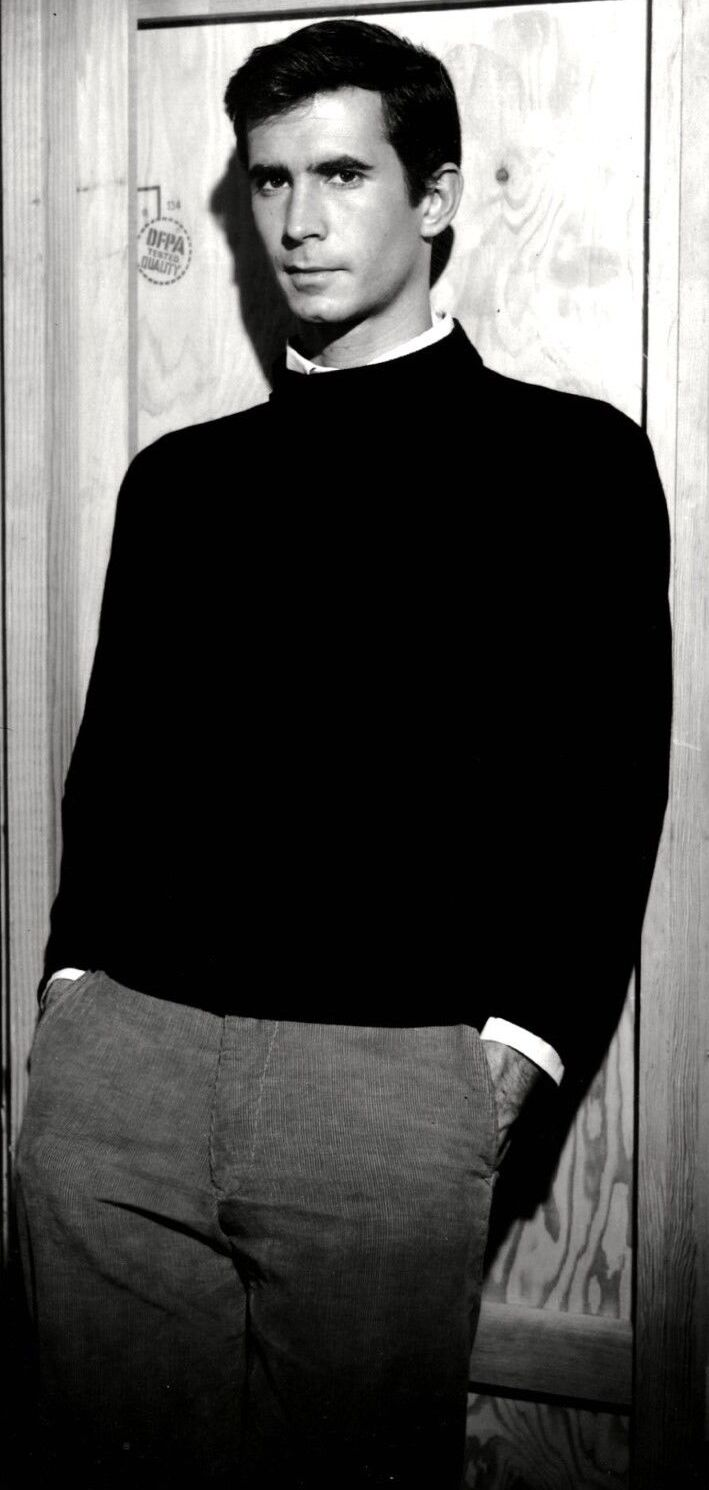
In the 1960s American horror films Psycho and Bates Motel, the character Norman Bates was depicted as having an intense and unhealthy relationship with his mother, showing the dark side of being a "mother's boy."

This was portrayed in the 2020 Netflix TV sitcom Never Have I Ever, where character Devi Vishwakumar is rejected by her love interest Des, as his mother disapproves of their relationship, stating "Look, Devi, you’re cool and all, but dating you isn’t worth angering my mom. I mean, she still pays for my phone.”

The mother's boy phenomenon is also comically portrayed in other popular TV sitcoms such as The Big Bang Theory, starring Simon Helberg as Howard Wolowitz, a man who still lives with his mother in his late 20's. Howard's relationship with his overbearing mother is a recurring source of humour. His constant need for his mother's approval and his reluctance to fully separate from her highlights the stereotype of the mother's boy in Western culture. There is also a portrayal as a running joke in the comedy series Arrested Development, where Buster Bluth, is attached to his mother, Lucille, and participated in an annual mother-son dinner dance called "Motherboy" for around 30 years, well into his adulthood.

In the 1960s American horror films Psycho and Bates Motel, Norman's intense and unhealthy relationship with his mother depicts the dark side of being a mother's boy. Norman's deep emotional attachment to his mother, coupled with her extreme influence, contributes to his descent into madness and eventual transformation into an infamous killer in the film.

Overall, the term "mother's boy" reflects the complex dynamics observed in mother-son relationships amongst Western society.

== See also ==
- Human bonding
- Jewish mother stereotype
- Oedipus complex
- Sigmund Freud
- Attachment Theory
- Mary Ainsworth
- John Bowlby
- Romantic relationships
- Raja Beta syndrome
