= Celibacy syndrome =

Media hypothesis

Celibacy syndrome (Japanese: セックスしない症候群, sekkusu shinai shōkōgun) is a media hypothesis proposing that a growing number of Japanese adults have lost interest in sexual activity or do not desire sex, in reference to the large number of young Japanese who are considered asexual, sexually abstinent, or who otherwise look down on sexual activities generally. In addition, many have lost interest in romantic love, dating and marriage. Following a report in The Guardian, the theory gained widespread attention in English media outlets in 2013, and was subsequently refuted by several journalists and bloggers.

== Reports and causes ==
In addition to celibacy, the theory cites declining numbers of marriages and declining birthrates in Japan. According to surveys conducted by the Japan Association for Sex Education, between 2011 and 2013, the number of female college students reporting to be virgins increased. Additionally, surveys conducted by the Japanese Family Planning Association (JFPA) indicated a high number of Japanese women who reported that they "were not interested in or despised sexual contact". Meanwhile, surveys conducted by the National Institute of Population and Social Security Research in Japan in 2008 and 2013, revealed that the number of Japanese men and women reporting to not be in any kind of romantic relationship grew by 10%.

The theory attributes two possible causes for these reports: the past two decades of economic stagnation as well as high gender inequality in Japan.

== Criticism ==
Joshua Keating accused The Guardian and other media outlets of using "cherry-picked" data in order to make a sensational claim that appeals to Western notions of a "weird Japan". The Washington Post pointed to contrary statistics that indicate that Japanese youth are having sex more frequently than ever.

== See also ==
- Aging of Japan
- Herbivore men
