= Construction industry in Japan =

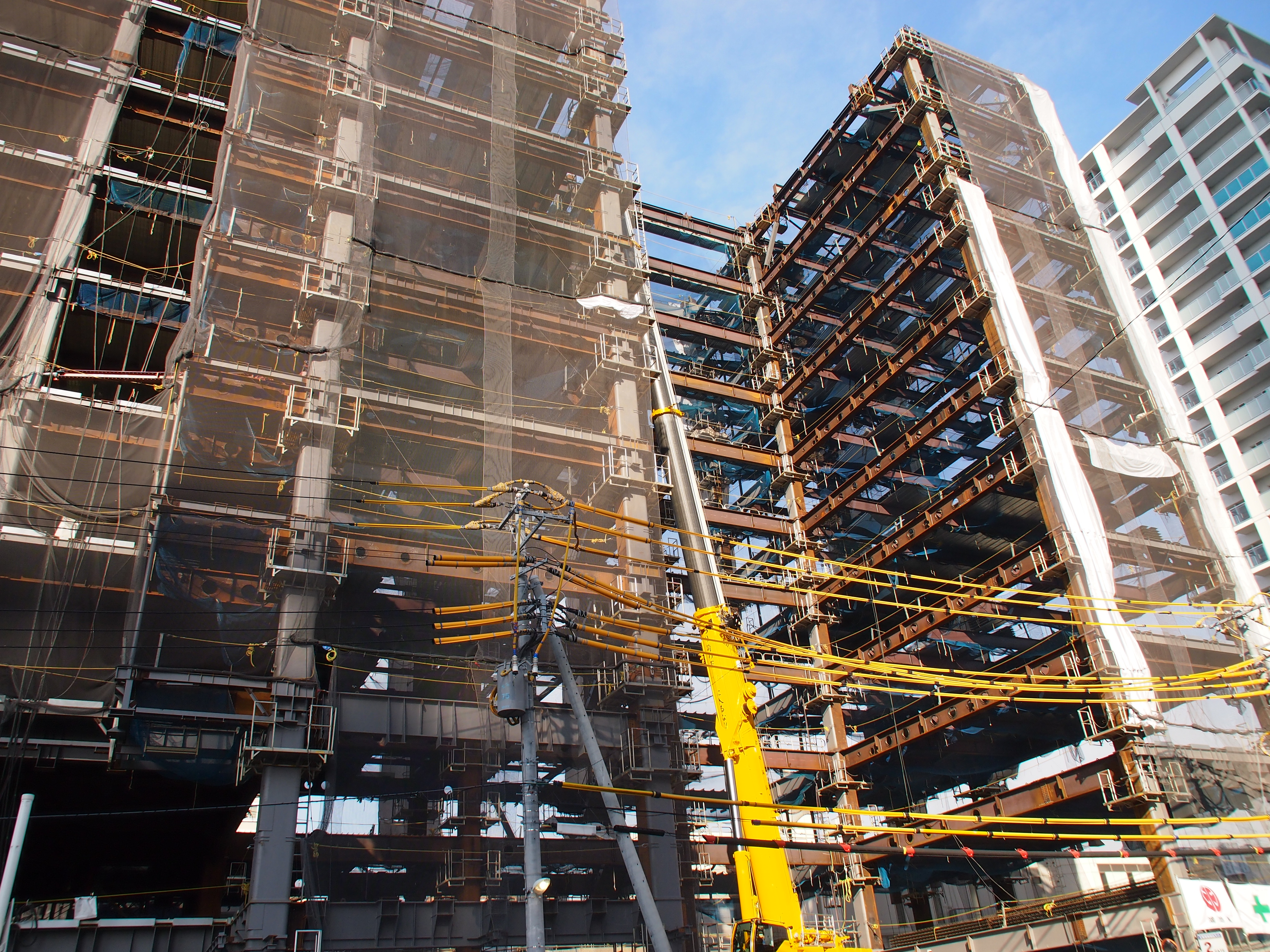
A construction site in Kawasaki, Kanagawa

The construction industry in Japan is a large component of the Japanese economy in terms of economic output and employment. Its history is one that mirrors closely the overall economic path of the country, from establishment of the capital during the feudal era, through economic modernization and imperial rule, and until today with the recovery and great economic expansion of Japan's post-war years. More recently, the industry has been influenced by preparations for major events, most notably the 2020 Summer Olympics, and a push towards sustainability. Contemporary challenges include maintaining access to labor and combating political corruption.

== History ==
=== Classical and feudal era ===
The first physical record of a construction industry in Japan is Horyuji, a Buddhist temple that was completed in 607 and is now the world's oldest wooden building. More comparable to a modern industry can be seen starting in Edo, now Tokyo, during the Edo Period. By the 17th century, Edo was the world's largest city, with a population of over one million. Edo carpenters benefited in particular from the Sankin-kōtai(参覲交代) system, which required daimyo, feudal lords, to spend alternating years in Edo. The extent of the development this spurred in Osaka, Edo and traveling stations was such that regulations on logging had to be established to ensure a sustainable supply of construction materials. The typical housing for lower classes was all-wood buildings with the expectation of frequent reconstruction. Due to the frequency of large fires, rebuilding was an expected, and even celebrated as part of life in Edo.

=== Early modern and imperial era ===
In the Meiji Period, from 1867 to 1912, seeking to promote industrialization and adoption of Western practices, the government launched infrastructure programs that produced the first construction contractors in Japan, some of which still exist today as major construction firms. Engineers from Europe and the United States introduced Western building techniques, and buildings were constructed in Western architectural styles. During this period, public works projects were contracted to companies based on competitive bidding systems.

This period also saw the first formal studies in Japan of the architectural implications of its many earthquakes. Early efforts in the late 19th century were conducted by the country's pioneering seismological societies and architectural engineering students investigating the aftermath of earthquakes and their effects on buildings. Japan's first building code was enacted in 1919 and additions in later years would include provisions to help prevent earthquake and wind damage.

The following imperial period saw Japanese construction firms involved in building infrastructure in overseas colonial possessions, such as Korea and Manchukuo. These encompassed a vast array of projects, including roads, railroads, ports, and communication networks, as well as various industrial and military installations.

=== Post-war era ===
In 1945, immediately after World War II, the construction industry suffered under United States Occupation of Japan despite the scale of rebuilding needed in devastated Japanese cities. Industrial infrastructure was relocated from inside Japan to former enemy territories such as China and the Philippines as war reparations. Furthermore, building resources such as cement were subject to production limits or requisitioned for the construction of US military bases. By 1948, this approach was abandoned in favor of building up Japanese industry. Japan began receiving technology from the United States, and rebuilding of physical infrastructure and key industries expanded significantly, especially after the Korean War in 1950. This led to a construction boom where up to 40% of Japan's public budget went towards construction projects until the 1990s. Important projects during this period included dams, public housing, and transportation infrastructure.

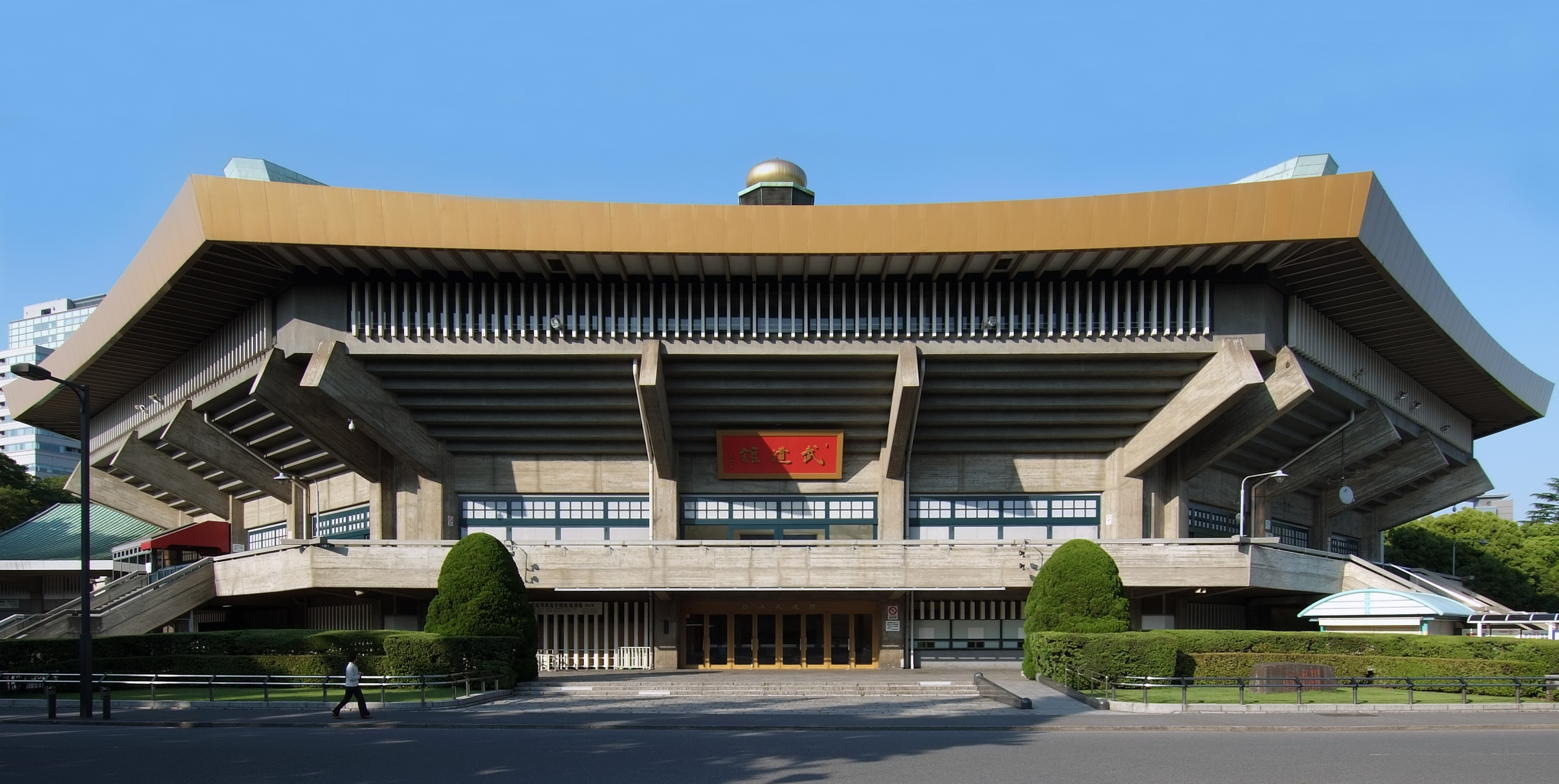
The Nippon Budokan, originally constructed for the 1964 Olympics and today a famous sports, music and event arena

The 1964 Summer Olympics, the first Olympic Games to be hosted in Asia, was a significant event for Japan in demonstrating its recovery after the war and the construction industry was heavily involved in its preparation. Thirty venues were used, and total spending to host the Olympics was approximately equal to the entire national budget that year. A number of infrastructure projects were also completed in anticipation of the event, including highways, the modernization of Haneda Airport, and the completion of the first route of the Shinkansen between Tokyo and Osaka.

== Contemporary features ==
=== Economic impact ===
In 2018, the Japanese construction industry contributed 28.4 trillion Yen to Japan's GDP. Factors in the short-term growth in the industry around this time include preparations for the 2019 Rugby World Cup and the 2020 Summer Olympics, stimulus spending, and disaster relief projects. During this period, capital expenditure in the industry was growing while significantly exceeding the growth in spending in other industries.

However, despite its size, Japan's construction industry suffers from a shortage of labor, making it one of Japan's least productive sectors. Causes for this include a small labor pool, and a high average age for the industry, where a fourth of skilled workers are over 60. This hampers the industry's potential for output growth. To counteract this, the industry has sought to invest in automation, such as robotics, and expand the labor pool by reaching out to younger workers or workers from overseas.

=== Sustainability ===
Energy efficiency and reducing greenhouse gas emissions is a goal of the Japanese government, which has resulted in national standards for energy usage as well as emissions standards set by local governments. There have also been technological approaches, including prefabricated houses produced with minimal CO_{2} emissions or more energy efficient construction materials.

=== Corruption ===
There are a number of interactions between the Japanese construction industry and its government that can be construed as corrupt. Observers note that companies have given political contributions or bribes to the government, particularly in the past when it was actively instituting protective measures or incentives to encourage industrial development. Very common especially in construction is dango (談合) or bid-rigging to arbitrarily raise project costs, enriching contractors at the expense of taxpayers. Even the largest construction contractors in Japan have been found to participate in this type of collusion, which has been investigated by the Fair Trade Commission.

=== Notable companies ===
In 2018, the construction industry in Japan included 3.5 million employees working for 451,000 companies, notable among which are five major vertically integrated firms with extensive operations both domestically and overseas:

- Kajima
- Obayashi Corporation
- Shimizu Corporation
- Takenaka Corporation
- Taisei Corporation

== See also ==
- Japanese architecture
- Transportation in Japan
- Ministry of Land, Infrastructure and Transport (Japan)
