= Mammoni =

Italian men who still live at home

Mammoni (sing. mammone) are Italian men "mamma's boys" in their 20s, 30s, or even 40s who still live at home and rely on their mothers for cooking, cleaning, and laundry. Driven by cultural, economic, and family factors, these men are NEET and enjoy a comfortable, pampered life at home with few responsibilities. Many mammoni continue to receive help with basic household chores even after marrying, and this interference of the mother-in-law causes nearly a third of divorces. The mammoni lifestyle is standard for unmarried men in Italy: two-thirds of young Italian men are mammoni.

== See also ==
- Parasite single
- Attachment theory
- strawberry generation
- amae
