= Permanent employment in Japan =

Shūshin koyō (終身雇用; "employment for life") is the term for permanent employment in Japan. It was extremely common in major Japanese companies, beginning with the first economic successes in the 1920s. It continued to be a defining characteristic of Japanese corporate culture through the Japanese post-war economic miracle, but its prominence waned after the bursting of the Japanese asset price bubble, the Lost Decade and subsequent economic reforms.

== History ==
Shūshin koyō starts with an event called Shinsotsu-ikkatsu-saiyō (simultaneous recruiting of new graduates) in which a large cohort of recent university graduates all enter a company at once. It gave Japanese workers the important feeling of job security as part of Japanese management culture, and in turn, elicited a high degree of company loyalty. A high demand for the few available engineers forced companies to bind these employees to the company. The collapse of the Japanese asset price bubble and the following crisis in the 1990s did not weaken the practice. Some critics of lifetime employment hoped that with Junichiro Koizumi's administration, lifetime employment would become less common. They hoped that neoliberal economics policies would result in privatization, firing of old and expensive workers, and the rise of part-time jobs. Due to the Great Recession and the 2008 financial crisis, some companies discontinued the practice of shūshin koyō and implemented mass layoffs. Thus, there was less job security as shūshin koyō was challenged.

However, as noted by researcher Koji Takahashi in 2019: "in the case of regular workers, the practice of long-term employment is maintained, in the sense that both employers and labor unions still seek to avoid making dismissals or voluntary retirement solicitations."

A 2010 study found that most Japanese workers are not in "lifetime employment", and that at most 20% of workers can be said to have it. Estimating the precise number is difficult because it is not enshrined in employment contracts.
