= Masahiro Yamada (sociologist) =

Japanese sociologist (born 1957)

Masahiro Yamada (山田 昌弘, Yamada Masahiro; born November 30, 1957) is a Japanese sociologist known for coining popular sociological terms like parasite singles and gap-widening society (格差社会, kakusa shakai). A graduate of University of Tokyo, he now teaches at Tokyo Gakugei University as professor.
