= Ageing of Australia =

Demographic phenomenon in Australia

Demographics of Australia
- Population: 24.6 million
- Density: 1.731
- Growth rate: 1.6%
- Birth rate: 1.81/woman
- Death rate: 7.3/1000
- Life expectancy: 82.50 Years
- Infant mortality: 3.3 Deaths/1000 births

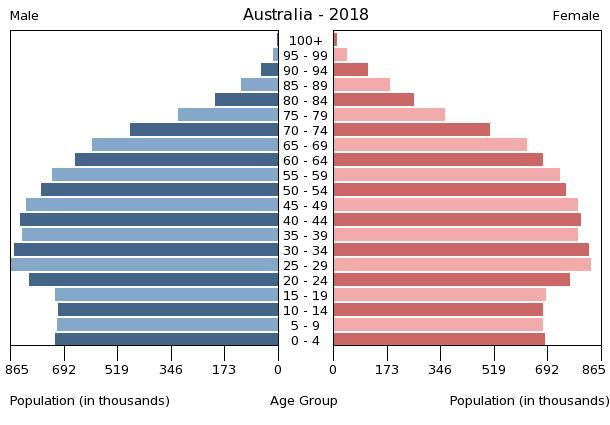
Population pyramid of Australia in 2018

Australia has an ageing demographic. The proportion of the Australian population aged 65 and over was 15% in 2017, a trend which is expected to continue to grow. It is estimated that by 2057 older people will account for 22% of the Australian population which translates to 8.8 million people. This increase in elderly population is due to what is known as The Australian Baby Boom (years 1946 to 1965). This period refers to the post-war era in which total fertility rates (TFR) were approximately 3.0, resulting in 4.19 million births recorded. This number exceeded the number of births in Australia from the previous 20 years in which there were 1.63 million births, and the proceeding 20 years in when 2.56 million births were recorded. The baby boom children will be celebrating their 65th birthday between 2011 and 2030, the age which is referred to as elderly.

Owing to this ageing Australian demographic trend, Australia's economy, social engagement and workforce are all affected.

== Ageing dynamics ==
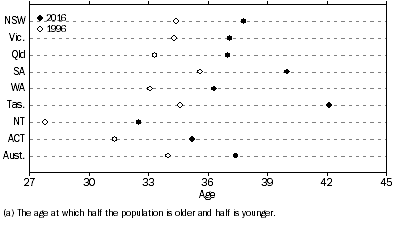
The median age of Australian in 1996 compared to 2016.

=== Median age ===
The median age of Australians has also accordingly increased with the ageing population trend. The median age of the Australian population was 34 during 1996; as of 2025, this figure has now increased to 42.0 though the median age of capital cities remains considerably lower at 36.9 years. Of all the Australian states and territories, Tasmania has had the largest upsurge in median age increasing to 42 years in 2016, a seven-year increase since 1996.

=== Australians aged 65 and over ===
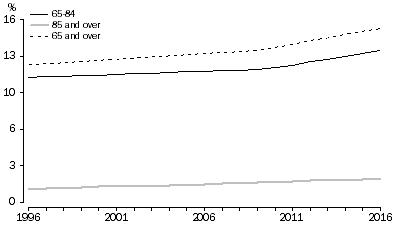
The proportion of Australians aged 65 and above have increased between the years 1996 and 2016.

While the percentage of Australians between the ages of 15 and 64 years has seen minimal change only decreasing by 0.7% between years 1996 and 2016, the percentage of citizens aged 65 years and above has had an increase of 3.3%. In 1927, 319 000 Australians were over the age of 65, then in 1977 this increased to 1.3 million. In 2018, approximately 1 in 7 Australians were aged 65 years or over with this number predicted to continue to increase and reach 8.8 million by 2057

=== Australians aged 85 and over ===
From the beginning of the 21st century until July 2016, the Australian population aged 85 years and above has increased by 141.2%. From 2016 to 2017, the Australian population aged over 85 increased from 484,600 to 494,300; that is a 9,700 increase within a one-year period.

== Causes ==
There are two main causes for the growing ageing population; this includes declining mortality rates and the subsequent high life expectancy of Australians and the decreasing fertility rates.

=== High life expectancy ===
In 1972 mortality rates of the elderly began to drop. From 1907 to 2016, the death rate of males and females has decreased by 71% and 76% respectively, and between 2014 and 2016 Australia's males aged 65 were predicted to live until they were 84.6 years old and women of the age 65 between these same years were expected to live to the age of 87.3 years. This high life expectancy is as result of Australia's low mortality rates, as well as improvements in health care and advances in medical technologies have all contributed to Australia's increasing ageing population.

Decreasing mortality rates and the subsequently increasing life expectancy of Australians has seen an upward trend since the beginning of the 20th century. Between 2001 and the 1970s, for Australians aged 65 to 69 mortality rates have dropped by 47%. This is due to advances in living environments, including "better water supplies, sewerage systems, food quality and health education". Health services such as hospitals have also improved in the ability to quarantine infection and the general public's knowledge regarding how to protect themselves from diseases has also grown. Furthermore, developments in medical tools and skills, for example: the concept of immunisation and antibiotics have become a widespread phenomenon across Australia necessitating a surging life expectancy.

The general public's knowledge regarding their lifestyle, such as what constitutes a healthy diet. In fact, education regarding the negative health implications of smoking has instigated a behavioural shift regarding the proportion of Australians smoking. Australia has seen the percentage of women smoking decrease by 9% and men by 19% from 1977 to 2008. It was projected in 2003 that smoking was liable for claiming approximately 7.8% of what would have been 'healthy' years in an Australian's life due to its onset of debilitating or fatal illnesses. This increased awareness has contributed to the decline in Australians falling prematurely fatally sick (such as heart disease or lung cancer) as a result of preventable poor lifestyle choices due to lack of education in this arena, not immunising one's self against illnesses, consuming unnecessary amounts of alcohol and unhealthy foods, lacking an essential amount of consumption of fruits and vegetables and adequate amount of exercise. The increased education and the subsequent implementation of few or many of these 'healthy' lifestyle essentials have precipitated the increased expected age of life in Australia as disease and mortality rates decrease

=== Low fertility rate ===
There have been three phases of the declining fertility rate trend in Australia between the 1960s and the beginning of the 21st century. The first stage occurred between 1961 and 1975 in which the fertility rate dropped from 3.55 to 2.15 children per woman. The second stage of the fertility decline was during the 1980s, in which there was a 0.08 drop from 1.92 to 1.84. The final of these three phases began at the beginning of the 1990s in which the fertility rate in Australia continued to decline, reaching 1.73 children per woman in 2001. Since then the fertility rate has increased to 1.74 births per woman in 2017. After the fertility rate reached 1.84 children per woman at the end of the second phase, Australia's total fertility rate has been below replacement level. This is due to the transforming Australian society, in which there has been a cultural shift in attitudes towards women in the workforce. Rather, an increased number of women are now favouring a career over having a family, in turn, increasing the commonality of staying single or marrying in later life; all factors which have led to the decline in fertility rates in Australia.

== Effects ==
=== Economic ===
The economy of Australia refers to its population, participation and productivity. The ageing demographic has an effect on this due as the rate at which citizen works, is impacted by their age. When people reach the age of 55 in Australia, their working participation begins to reduce and as such the Australian elderly population have low working rates compared to those aged under 55.

2011 saw the beginning of the retirement of the baby boomers as the generation celebrated their 65th birthdays. Since then, the proportion of the population in retirement has grown and while the proportion of those in their major working years has begun to drop. This shift has impacted the Australian budget. While there is a reduction in revenue due to the declining working population, there is also a larger demand for elderly support such as nursing homes and care takers. Due to this increase in spending and decrease in cash flow revenue the elderly population is predicted to deduct 0.4 percentage points from the annual real growth in revenue and add 0.3 percentage points to the annual real growth in spending. Ultimately, this will lessen tax income and add to Australia's spending demands. This translates to $36 billion of added cost to the yearly Australian budget by 2029.

Due to the baby boomer generation entering the latter part of the life (the 70s and 80s), need for health services has increased and is predicted to continue to increase as the ageing demographic continues to grow. While it is predicted that the increasing ageing demographic of Australia will result in a 20 billion detraction from revenue in 2029, it is also said to increase Australia's revenue by approximately 187 billion due to income increase and population increase, and consequently the remaining revenue increase in Australia is predicted to be around $166 billion by 2029.

=== Changing health profiles ===
As a person increases in age it is of higher chance that they have a health condition. With the increasing ageing Australian population subsequently, it is expected that there will be an increase in chronic diseases such as dementia, arthritis and cancer; these being the most common in elderly people, affecting 49% of the Australian elderly. As the number of citizens with such diseases increase, it is becoming a rising challenge for the Australian health care system to cater and manage this appropriately. Dementia is particularly prevalent in the elderly population. In 2014, there were 332,000 Australians who had dementia and of this, 93% were of an elderly age (65 or above). This is number is projected to increase to approximately 900,000 by 2050.

With this rise in chronic diseases as a result of the growing elderly population, health care services are in high demand. In 2012, 98% of Australia's elderly population visited a health expert and 57% of those aged 65 and above visited a specialist, which is 29% greater than those aged below 65. Furthermore, there has also been a rise in the proportion of the population required aged care residential services. In fact, between 2003 and 2013, the number of the elderly population living in aged care residences increased by 20%. Due to this increased demand for support and health services, challenges are presented towards this industry. While the Australian health sector is sizable, with the increasing elderly population it is predicted that there will be shortages in workers who possess the appropriate skills to cater for the elderly's health care needs.

== Comparisons with other countries ==
This ageing trend is also reflected in many other populations around the world. According to the United Nations, all countries in the world are experiencing an increase in their elderly population. It is projected that by 2050 the world's elderly population will at least double, and by 2100 it will triple increasing from 962 million in 2017 to 2.1 billion in 2050 and 3.1 billion in 2100.

This is particularly evident in industrialised countries and continents such as Japan and Hong Kong and a large portion of Europe including Switzerland, Greece and Italy. In particular Europe in 2017 had the largest percentage of elderly people, with 25% of their population being above the age of 60.

By 2050 all continents, excluding Africa will have at least a quarter of their subsequently populations of an elderly age. This is due to similar reasons to the causes of Australia's increasing elderly population just as increased life expectancy and continual low fertility rates. In fact, in the countries of "Japan, Italy, France, Greece, Sweden, Canada, United Kingdom and Hong Kong" the number of elderly people surpasses the number of people aged from 0–14. In Australia this is predicted to occur around 2034.

Compared to the United Kingdom and the United States of America, Australia's median age in 2015 was slightly less than these two countries. For instance, the United States of America had a median population age of 37.6 and the United Kingdom's was 40.2, and Australia's was slightly less at 37.2. Furthermore, in the same year the percentage of elderly people in these particular countries were similar. The proportion of the Australian population that was 65 or above was 15%, the United States of America was 18% and the United Kingdom was also 15%. Additionally, these countries all have alike future growth projections regarding their elderly population with, by 2020, the proportion of elderly people in Australia projected to grow by 1.2%, the United States of America estimated to increase by 2% and the United Kingdom expected to rise by approximately 0.9%.

== See also ==
- Demography of Australia
- Health care in Australia
- Aged care in Australia

=== International ===
- Aging of Japan
- Ageing of Europe
- Aging of the United States
- Aging of Canada
- Russian Cross

=== General ===
- Population ageing
- Population pyramid
- World population
- Sub-replacement fertility
