= Aging of the United States =

Ongoing demographic trend

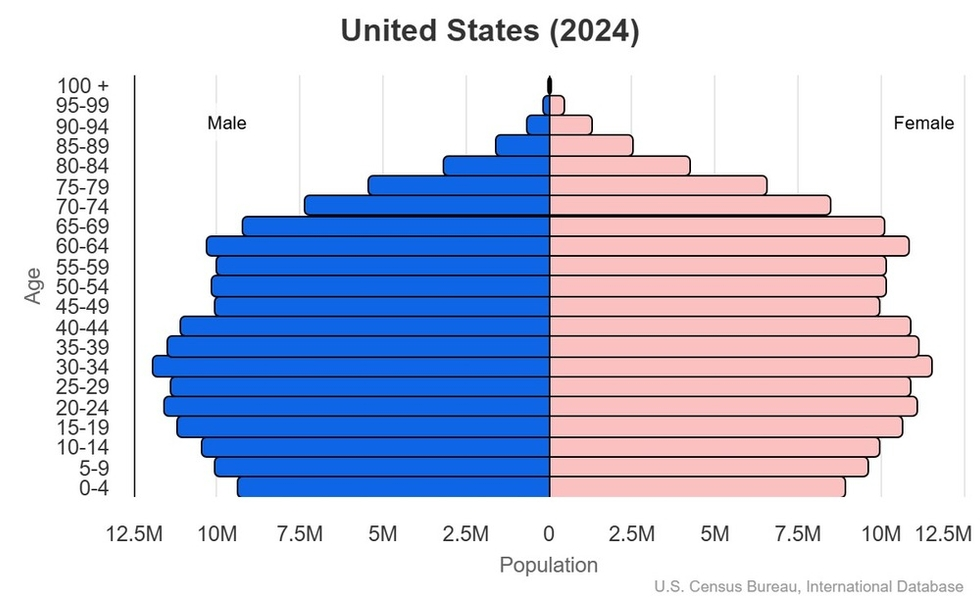
Population pyramid of the United States in 2024

Since the 2010s, the fertility rate of the United States has declined below replacement level, prompting projections of an aging population and workforce, as is already happening elsewhere in the developed world and some developing countries. The decline has been most noticeable since after the Great Recession of the late 2000s. Nevertheless, the rate of aging in the United States remains slower than that seen in many other countries, including some developing ones, giving the nation a significant competitive advantage. Unintentional pregnancies have become less common; in particular, teenage pregnancies have dropped to record lows.

During the 2010s and early 2020s, many Baby Boomers continued to postpone retirement while Millennials and Generation Z were responsible for a surge in the labor force. Still, seniors have been retiring faster than youths can replace them, partly due to the time needed to acquire the necessary skills and knowledge. Going forward in the 2020s, a priority for state legislatures is to retain and attract skilled workers from other states. At the national level, the United States faces shortages of skilled workers, but does not offer foreign talents, including graduates of American universities, a straightforward path towards residency or citizenship.

At the same time, industrial automation has accelerated to address the labor shortage while a combination of population aging and growing public skepticism has led to the shrinkage of higher education. There are currently many high-skilled jobs that do not require a college degree.

Women's workforce participation has grown as the nation's birthrate declines, opening up more opportunities for them. But American women continue to have more children on average than their counterparts in other industrialized nations despite the fact that the United States does not offer generous welfare programs by comparison. Given the experience of other countries, pro-natalist policies such as paid maternity leave are unlikely to significantly increase the birthrate in the United States. As the youth bulge fades away after the 2020s, the United States may be less prone to sociopolitical instability.

While it remains unclear how population aging would affect the United States in the long run, the basic assumptions of economic growth and social welfare programs predicated on population growth would have to be re-examined. However, fears of a demographic cliff may be an overreaction. As economist Claudia Goldin explains, "Scarcity is everywhere; trade-offs are everywhere. There is no optimal birth rate."

== History ==
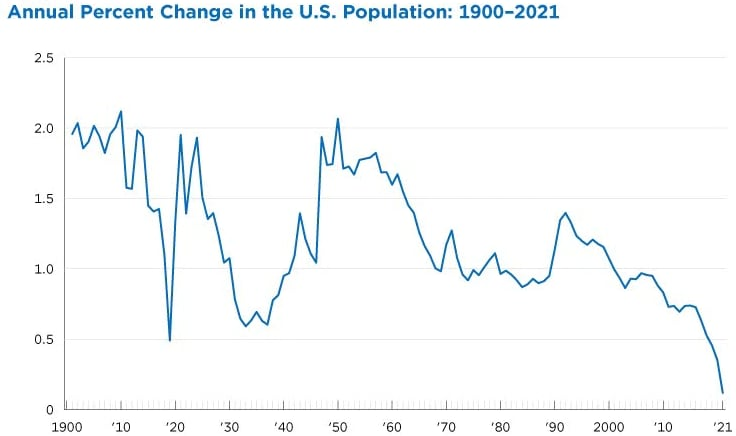
The rate of population growth in the United States has been falling since the 1990s

Aside from the baby boom that followed the Second World War, the birth rate in the United States has declined steadily since the early nineteenth century, when the average person had as many as seven children and infant mortality was high. Americans of all ethnic groups and socioeconomic classes were having fewer children towards the end of the nineteenth century. For example, European-American women living in the North had an average of only three and a half children by 1900.

In a 1905 speech, President Theodore Roosevelt criticized Americans for having fewer children, and described the declining birth rate as a "race suicide" among Americans, quoting eugenicist Edward Alsworth Ross. During the 1930s, the Great Depression caused a substantial decrease in the birth rate, but this trend was reversed by the baby boom that followed World War II, thanks to a combination of economic prosperity, rapid technological progress, and medical advances making housekeeping and child-rearing less onerous for women. In 1960, the total fertility rate of the United States was 3.6. American parents of the postwar era married earlier and had more children than their predecessors. Towards the end of the twentieth century, however, like other Western nations, the United States witnessed a general decline in the desire for children, and the prevalence of childlessness—voluntary and otherwise—increased.

While U.S. fertility rates were roughly at replacement level during the 1990s and early 2000s, they declined during the 2007-2009 Great Recession and, contrary to expectations, never rebounded afterwards even though the U.S. economy had recovered. During the second half of the 2010s, the rate of population growth of the United States was in steady decline. The 2020 Census reveals that the number of Americans aged five or younger is lower than in 2010. Between the mid-2010s and the mid-2020s, all states saw a fall in fertility; states with the highest fertility rates had the steepest decline. Much of this decrease was concentrated in rural counties and in communities with traditionally high religiosity and birth rates, such as Utah. The COVID-19 pandemic further reduced the birth rate, a "bump" in 2021 notwithstanding, while also increasing the death rate in the country. At the same time, many women are choosing to delay childbearing or to forego having children altogether, a trend observed among both married and single women. By 2024, the total fertility rate of the United States fell just under 1.6, the lowest on record. The rate of population growth in the early 2020s was at a historic low, driven mainly by immigration. At current trend, Millennials are on track to have the lowest birth rate in history. Between 1990 and 2015, the number of married couples aged 18 to 34 with children dropped from 37% to 25%. An analysis by the University of New Hampshire showed that 5.7 million more women of "childbearing age" had no children in 2024 compared to the historical trend, up from 2.1 million in 2016. Longitudinal analysis suggests that American women are not merely postponing having children but are increasingly avoiding it altogether. However, among Millennial women who have given birth, the average fertility rate is about 2.02 children per woman.

The Northeast and West Coast are aging more quickly than the Central and Southern United States.

Regardless, U.S. birth rates have been on the decline across virtually all age groups, socioeconomic classes, and races since the late 2000s. This trend could cause the general population of the country to age significantly in the future. The oldest Baby Boomers, a large demographic cohort, had started to reach retirement age in the 2010s. The median age of the United States rose from 28.1 in 1970 to 39.1 in 2024. An increase in median age is seen among all ethnic groups, though European Americans are currently the oldest by that measure, followed by African Americans and Asian Americans (including Amerindians and Native Alaskans); Hispanic and Latino Americans are the youngest. As of 2023, Maine (median age 44.8) and New Hampshire (43.3) were the oldest states in the Union, while Texas (35.5), the District of Columbia (34.8), and Utah (31.9) are the youngest. The U.S. Census Bureau estimated that at current trend, the number of older adults would outnumber children by 2035. Rural communities are aging the fastest.

In the modern world, it has become common for developed countries to fall below the replacement level of births or see population decline. Many of these countries have tried to launch government initiatives to combat this trend, including large cash incentives for having more children, but these programs have been largely ineffective. Nevertheless, American women tend to have their first children at an earlier age and end up having more children than their counterparts from other developed countries even though the U.S. does not have social welfare programs that are as generous as other rich nations.

Given 2020 demographic trends, it is projected that the U.S. population would grow slightly by 2100, while other countries, including China and India, would shrink. By the end of the twenty-first century, the United States could comprise 4% of the global population, where it is now, and the median age could reach around 45, making the nation younger than China, Japan, and the European Union. However, the number of Americans aged 65 and over will exceed that of children below the age of 18, according the U.S. Census Bureau.

== Causes ==
The bump in birth rates from the late 1940s to the early 1960s was the Baby boom period, which coincided with the post–World War II economic expansion.

The fertility rate in the U.S. has been in a downward trend, and is now below the replacement rate of 2.1 births.

The US rate of natural increase—birth rate minus death rate—has declined, indicating slower infusion of young people.

During the nineteenth century, the Industrial Revolution was under full swing and the United States became an increasingly urban society. As a consequence, fertility rates steadily fell during this period. Women born during the first decade of the twentieth century saw another dip fertility because they came of age during the First World War, the Spanish flu epidemic, and the Great Depression. Today, population aging and falling birth rates in the U.S. are driven by a variety of factors. While economic troubles and climate anxiety are commonly cited reasons, data suggest they are not the primary factors behind falling fertility in the U.S. Rather, it is due to changing attitudes; today's young people, especially women, tend to prioritize and expect more from their careers and are less interested in having children. Access to reliable contraception is another important factor. According to the Pew Research Center, the number of non-parents aged 18 to 49 who do not expect to have any children has grown. Among them, a lack of interest in children, medical issues, and financial problems were the top reasons for their predictions. Those who have children tend to do so later in life and they have fewer of them. Majorities of Americans no longer consider parenthood a source of happiness or fulfillment, and large numbers are not concerned about the nation's falling birth rate. Moreover, from the late twentieth century onward, the United States has become a fairly stable environment with low infant and child mortality rates on one hand and a competitive society on the other. This means that it is preferable for parents to have fewer children and invest more in each. Indeed, parenting in the United States has become increasingly intensive and costly. Middle-class households' spending on childcare has quadrupled between 1995 and 2023.

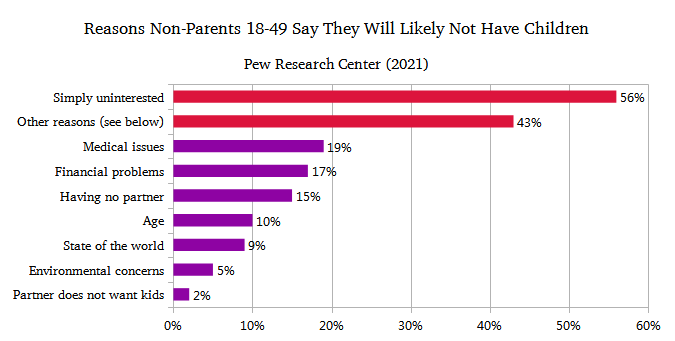
A growing share of American adults does not want to have children.

One outcome of the COVID-19 pandemic, as can be seen from online discussions, is that people have become more willing to openly discuss the difficulties of parenting and to challenge the cultural assumptions about being childfree. As parenthood continues to lose its appeal, more and more Americans prefer their own careers, leisure time, savings, and personal freedom to having children and fewer consider children to be a source of happiness or fulfillment. Among those with children, some have chosen not to have more either because they do not want them, because they would like to spend more time with the ones they already have, or because could not afford more children. In fact, many admit that their financial circumstances would improve once their children leave the house and that they would be better off not having children. Among those having fewer children than they would like, concerns over the state of the economy and personal financial security are common and many believe the cost of raising a child is too high. More and more women are realizing that having children is an option they can ignore in favor of economic or educational opportunities; some worry that a woman's career might stall if she chooses to have children. The number of American women earning university degrees has grown relative to men's since the late 2000s, coinciding with the long-term decline in birth rates. Globally, gender equality is associated with lower fertility. Women with access to contraception, (higher) education, and professional opportunities tend to have fewer children, if at all.

In the early 2020s, as many as one in five American adults do not want to have children, with some reporting they had made their decision early on. It remains unclear whether they would change their minds. Data dating back to the 1980s show that this is part of a long-term trend, possibly starting with the Baby Boomers, who were the first cohort to begin questioning social norms on family formation. As economist Melissa Kearney noted, "If it were socially acceptable for people in the past to remain childless, I wonder how many of them would have made the same decision." Furthermore, dedication to work and modern expectations of parents have increased the opportunity cost of having a child. Because of the aforementioned reasons, the birth rates of women of all age groups (except those in their forties), races, and educational levels have fallen. The number of European Americans has been shrinking since 2016 while the rates of growth of people of other races have fallen as well, except for those of mixed heritage. Overall, the fall of the European-American and youth populations is the biggest factor behind the aging of the United States. But this trend is moderated by the growth of non-white ethnic groups.

Teen birth rates have declined over the past few decades. The decline has contributed to the fall of the overall fertility rate of the United States.

In the United States today, while the number of single parents has grown, most people still have children within wedlock. But even married couples are less likely to have children, at least not right away, as the childfree lifestyle continues to gain traction. The number of unplanned pregnancies has decreased. Such pregnancies are more common among younger and poorer women, but these have become rarer since the 1980s. Even so, the rate still stood at 45% in 2018. Adolescent pregnancies, most of which are unintentional, also fell. Compared to a peak of 96.3 births per 1000 females aged 15 to 19 in 1957, when people married and had children early, the adolescent birth rate plummeted to 17.3 in 2018. (Black and Hispanic teenagers had the largest decline, though they were still above whites and Asians.) In 2024, it fell to 12.7, the lowest on record. There were no corresponding increases among women in their 30s or 40s, leading to a decline in the overall birthrate of the United States. The number of babies born to American teenagers fell from one in eight in 1990 down to one in 25 by 2022. Historically, the U.S. has had a high birth rate relative to other developed countries because of its anomalously high number of unintended pregnancies, including among teenagers. Twenty-first-century American youths are more likely to abstain from sexual intercourse and to have access to effective and long-acting methods of contraception, such as an intrauterine device (IUD), and to be more cautious about sexual intercourse than their predecessors.

Another major cause of population aging in the United States is the fact that the Baby Boomers, a large cohort, are getting older, adding a large group of older Americans to the population and causing the median age to move up. Although many Baby Boomers began reaching retirement age in the early 2010s, many of this cohort's youngest members are still several years away from retirement and remain successfully employed or are eligible for and seeking new jobs.

== Impacts ==
Recent research studies have documented that between 50% and 80% percent of Americans aged 50 or older have personally experienced or witnessed at least one episode of age discrimination in the workplace, with roughly 20% excluded from hiring or promotion and nearly 10% terminated from their jobs due to their age, despite federal and state protections for workers over the age of 40.

By 2030, 20% of Americans are projected to be 65 and older. Both the overall population of the country and the average age are projected to increase over coming years. Given that older people tend to need more health services, some demographers have theorized a significant impact on the country resulting from these trends. Population aging could create an increasing need for services such as nursing homes and care-giving.

=== Economy ===
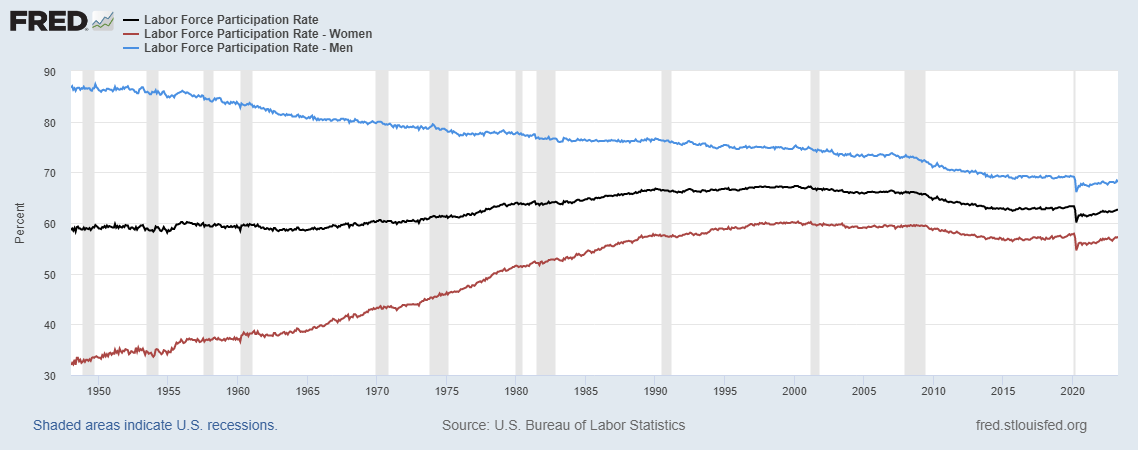
U.S. labor participation by sex from January 1948 to present

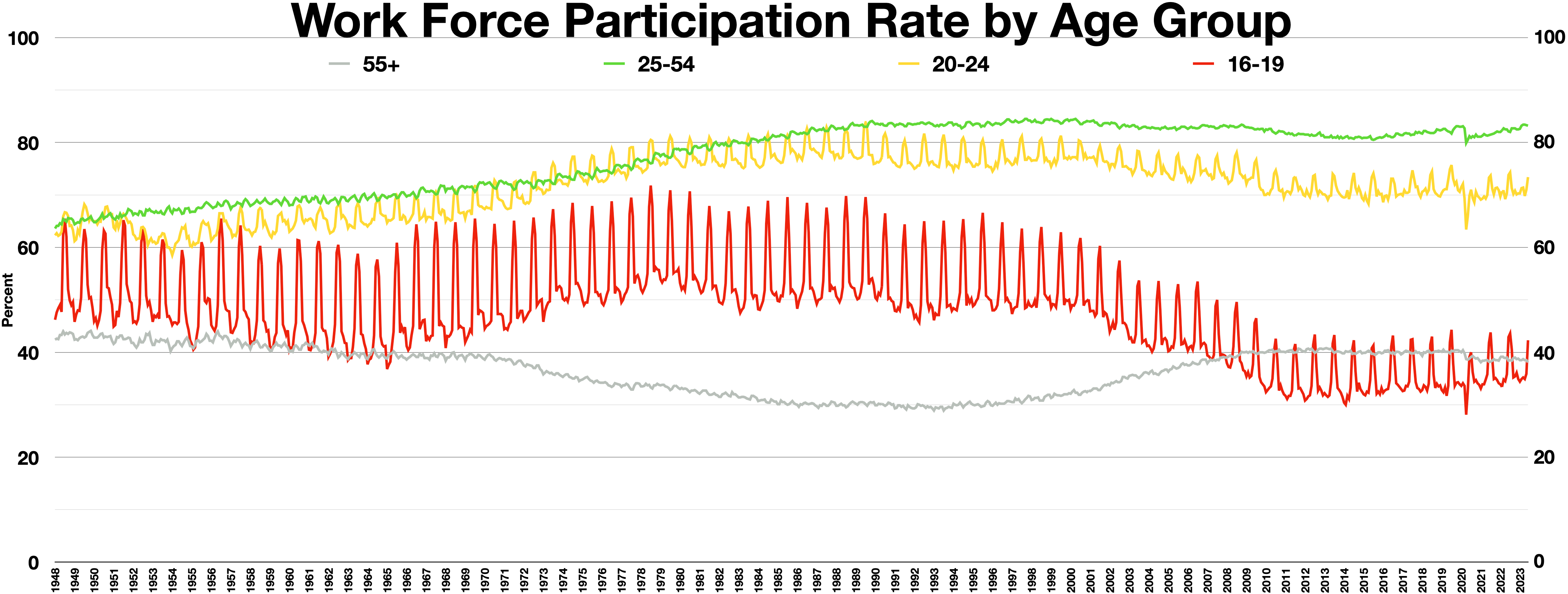
U.S. labor participation by age group 1948 to present

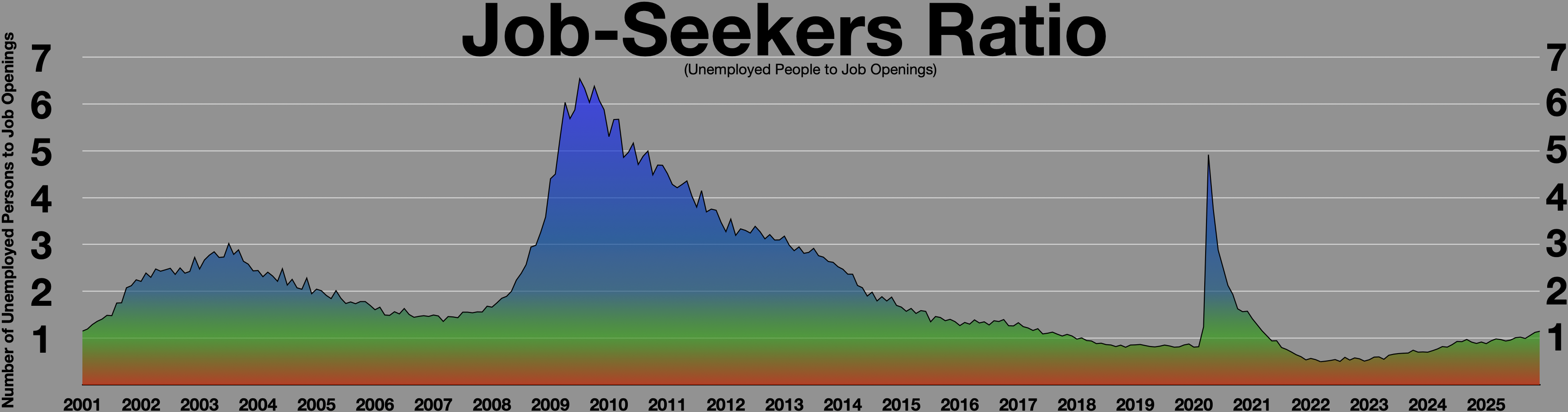
Job openings per unemployed worker from 2001 to present

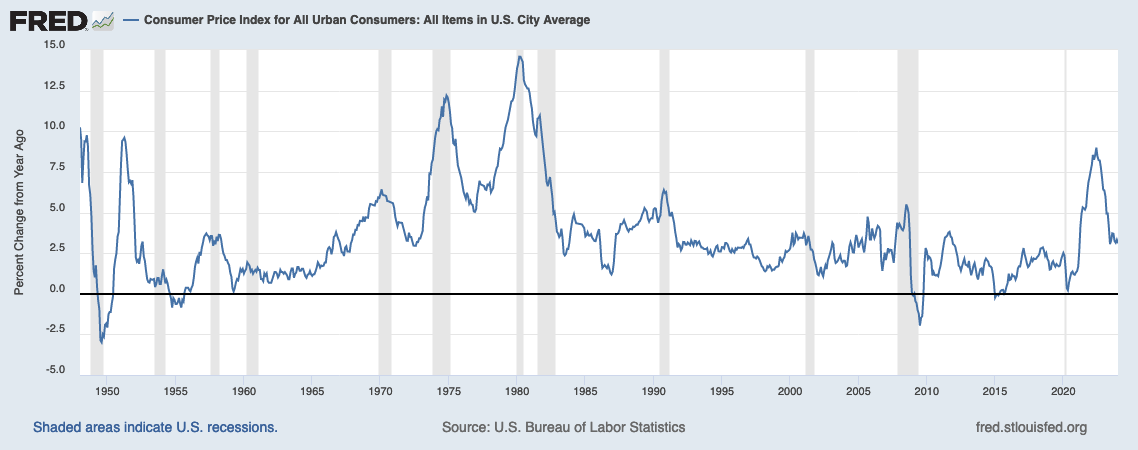
Inflation as measured by the consumer price index (CPI) in the United States for all urban consumers

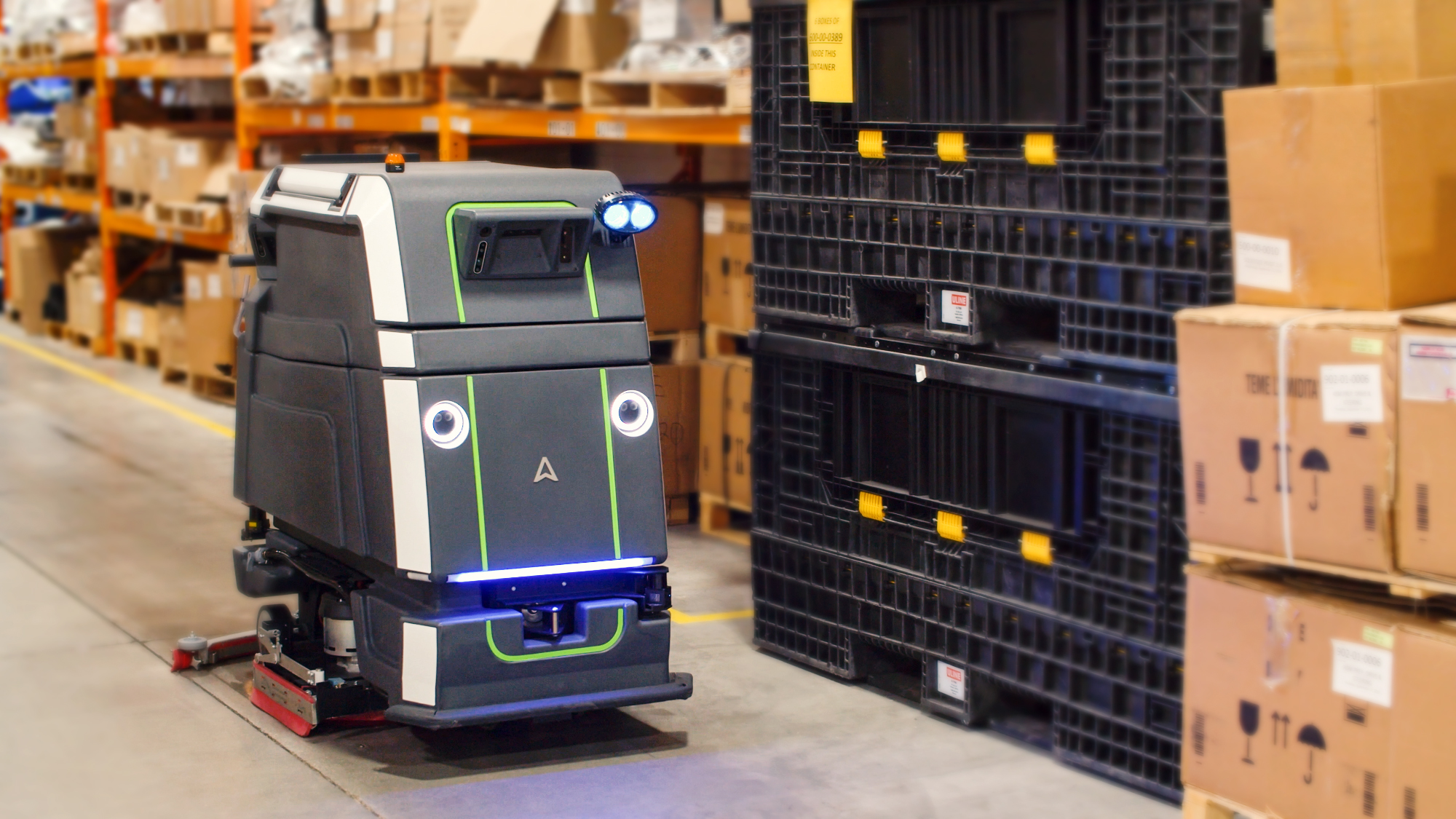
Population aging accelerates industrial automation

A shortage of workers is expected in the U.S. workforce due to a declining labor participation rate. Projections show that the demand for labor needed now is not being fulfilled, and the gap between labor needed and labor available will continue to expand over the future. Owing to the relatively large size population size of those born between the end of WWII and the mid-1960s (referred to by some as the "Baby Boomers"), the number of people generally considered to be of working age is declining. The retirement of members of the aging workforce could possibly result in the shortage of skilled labor in the future. A majority of experienced utility workers and hospital caregivers, for example, will be eligible for retirement.

By the late 2010s, the United States found itself facing a shortage of tradespeople, a problem that persisted in the early 2020s despite the COVID-19 pandemic-induced recession and prospective employers offering higher salaries and paid training. Having an aging population accelerates industrial automation. While many high school and college graduates are worried about job losses due to artificial intelligence (AI), the shortage of workers in various fields that cannot (yet) be automated) is worsening. Many of these do not require university degrees.

Experts expect the labor crunch of the early 2020s to continue for years to come, due to not just the Great Resignation, but also the aging of the U.S. population, the decline of the labor participation rate, and falling rates of legal immigration. During the Great Recession, population aging alone cost the United States 1.7 million workers, reckoned the Peterson Institute for International Economics. However, that does not necessarily mean that an aging society will be poorer. Places that have seen the most fertility declines also saw the largest gains in productivity by adopting labor-saving methods.

From a demographic point of view, the labor shortage in the United States during the 2020s is inevitable due to the sheer size of the aging Baby Boomers. As the oldest economically active cohort, the Baby Boomers comprised about a quarter of the U.S. workforce in 2018. Though they were projected by economists to begin retiring in the 2010s, 29% of older Baby Boomers (65–72 years of age) in the United States remained active in the labor force in 2018, a large portion compared to older cohorts at the same age. In 2025, 19.1% of Americans aged 65 and older participated in the labor force. The figure was an 11-month average because the federal government shutdown prevented data collection in October. Employment rates among workers aged 65 and over are increasing since the 1990s, and, indeed, the share of people who continue working after turning 65 is relatively high in the US, when compared to other developed countries. Seniors who choose to remain in the workforce tend to be highly educated and high-income earners. At the same time, technological innovations have made work more convenient, safer, and less physically demanding for (older) workers. In any case, the official age of retirement in the United States had already been raised, and Baby boomers were incentivized to postpone retirement in part because it allowed them to claim more Social Security benefits once they finally retired. Furthermore, large numbers would like semi-retirement arrangements or flexible work schedules. There is an ongoing shift away from pension plans in favor of 401(k) or similar options, which do not mandate retirement at a certain age.

The COVID-19 pandemic may have sped up the retirement of some Baby Boomers, however. According to the Pew Research Center, the number of retired Baby Boomers increased by 3.2 million in 2020, the largest annual increase in the previous decade. But even before the pandemic, the United States had a gap between the number of job openings and the number of unemployed people. Like most other members of the Organization for Economic Cooperation and Development (OECD), the U.S. has seen its productivity growth falter and its debt as a share of GDP increase due to demographic trends. Due to the central role of the U.S. dollar in global trade and finance, the nation can still afford to borrow more money. However, the current rate of growth of debt is unsustainable. Moreover, having an aging population and a labor shortage makes it more difficult to curb inflation.

A shrinking birth rate could exacerbate economic inequality by increasing the importance of family inheritance, while an overall decrease in the population could shrink the economy by reducing the demand for basic goods like groceries and real estate. On the other hand, having fewer or no children has enabled women to pursue more opportunities outside the home. In fact, places with the highest job growths in the 2010s saw the biggest drops in fertility. For women in such places, the opportunity cost of having a child was higher. Moreover, people without children do not need to save money to pass on to their children and as such can afford to work fewer hours per week and retire early.

The world's 15 largest economies, which together comprise three quarters of global GDP as of 2025, all have sub-replacement fertility. Nevertheless, unlike their counterparts in many other countries East and West, American Baby Boomers had many children of their own, the Millennials, who are a large cohort relative to the nation's population and are themselves having a relatively high birth rate, as of the 2010s. Millennials and Generation Z have been responsible for a surge in labor participation in the U.S. as the same time as the contraction of the workforce of major economies. Indeed, the U.S. workforce is projected to grow by 10% by 2040, and should not decline before 2048. However, young people are spending more time in education and training and are entering the workforce at a later age. A loss in skilled and capable workers has made it harder for employers to recruit new staff. State legislatures across the country were focused on retaining the workers they already have and to attract new ones from other states, especially in the education and healthcare sectors. But during the mid-2020s, a combination of the Baby Boomers retiring and the Trump administration's crackdown on immigration has pushed the monthly net gain in jobs required to keep unemployment steady towards zero.

Having a relatively young, diligent, and productive workforce means that the United States will continue to have a significant number of consumers, investors, and taxpayers in the upcoming decades. This gives the nation an economic edge over others. As of 2022, despite demographic trends, most U.S. states were in a fiscally healthy position; some even had budget surpluses. However, a sustained sub-replacement fertility and low rates of migration will lead to an aging population, a potential indicator that the U.S. economy could be less dynamic, innovative, and productive than it was in the past. By 2023, shortages of highly skilled workers are already jeopardizing the Joe Biden administration's plan to modernize public infrastructure and to rejuvenate the manufacturing sector. In addition, some women could make the decision to give up working in order to take care of their family members, exacerbating the labor shortage.

American suburbs have seen a growing share of their residents being retirees, a trend that jeopardizes the financial sustainability of various public services, including public schools. But because elderly citizens rely on fixed incomes, they mostly oppose tax increases. They also oppose new housing construction, thereby keeping the cost of housing high and preventing more young families from moving into their suburbs to make up for the shortfall in tax revenue.

=== Education ===
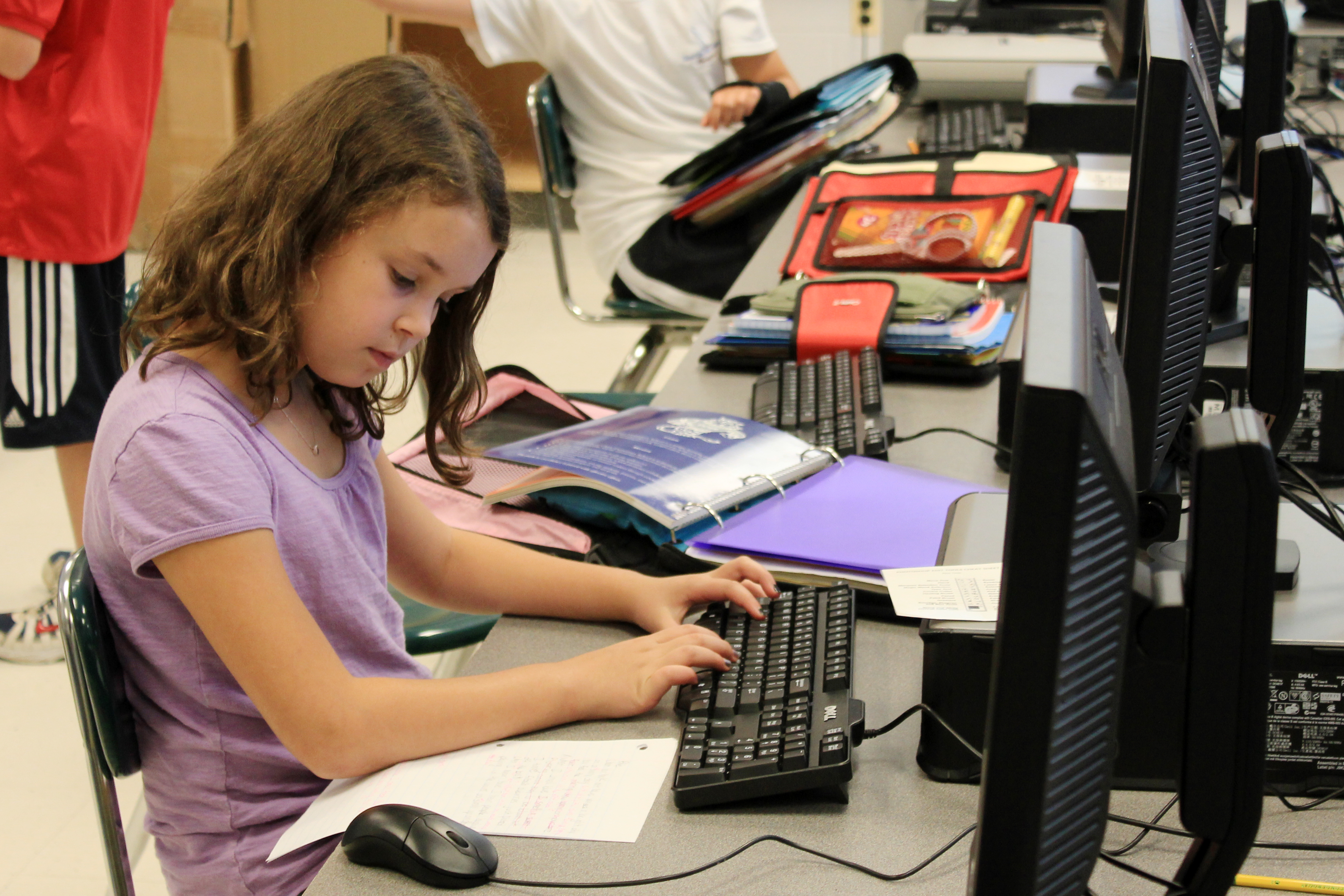
An aging population has reduced the number of school-aged children in the United States

In the 1970s, American colleges and universities saw a dramatic increase in enrollments due to the post-war baby boom and the growth of women in higher education and the work force. By the 1980s and 1990s, although the baby boom had long ended, institutions continued to enjoy good fortune due to growing demand. But this all changed in the aftermath of the Great Recession, which saw significant cuts in funding for education and falling birth rates. Nevertheless, the number of high-school graduates continued to grow during the 2010s. But by the early 2020s, enrollment in K-12 public schools has fallen significantly compared the prior decade, not just due to the switch to private schools and home schooling, but also because of a smaller number of school-aged children (5-17). Suburbs, which had previously been built to accommodate young and growing families and were centered around their public school districts, saw the fastest decline in elementary-school enrollments.

Since the late 2010s, the U.S. federal government under Presidents Donald Trump and Joe Biden have been emphasizing alternatives to higher education—vocational or technical training and apprenticeships—as part of its plan to rejuvenate the American industrial base and to modernize American public infrastructure. According to the Department of Education, people with technical or vocational trainings are slightly more likely to be employed than those with a bachelor's degree and significantly more likely to be employed in their fields of specialty. The United States currently suffers from a shortage of skilled blue-collar workers. Moreover, due to declining birth rates, the number of American high-school graduates is expected to drop after 2025, putting more pressure on institutions of higher learning at a time when many have already been permanently shut down. Domestic undergraduate enrollment has been on the decline for years, with only 62% of high-school graduates in 2022 heading for college compared to 70% in 2015. This trend is projected to accelerate in the 2030s. According to a 2020 report from the Western Interstate Commission for Higher Education (WICHE), the biggest declines will be seen in the Northeast, the Upper Midwest, and West Virginia, Mississippi, New Mexico, and California.

Already, public universities are struggling to convince state and local governments to keep funding them and have downsized or merged to curb costs. Many private colleges will likely not survive. Market trends are forcing the higher-education sector to innovate, which is something it has not traditionally been good at. To survive, non-elite institutions will have to cut back or eliminate courses in the liberal arts and humanities, like gender studies, and expand those in emerging fields, such as artificial intelligence, and professional programs, such as law enforcement. They might even have to lower their standards of admissions. By the mid-2020s, it has already become noticeably easier to get admitted to most colleges and universities in the United States. As of 2024, only 33 colleges and universities admitted less than 10% of applicants. Some institutions are also addressing untapped demands, such as mid-career training or continuing education, while others are expanding their early-decision pool to lock in applicants. In addition, Americans who work in higher education are older on average than the average American worker. In the future, this sector of the economy will need to find ways to retain staff or to encourage retirees to come back (part-time). Demand for education from the nation's most prestigious colleges and universities, however, is likely to remain high, in part because of rising numbers of Indian and Chinese Americans, for whom higher education is of utmost importance.

There is some research supporting the idea that in well-educated countries, it might actually benefit the population to have a birth rate below replacement levels because people at different ages do not make the same level of economic contributions on average. Moreover, having more children does not necessarily translate to boosting productivity. Only about 8% of Americans born to parents without a university degree will likely obtain one, and those without one are unlikely to become high income earners and taxpayers. While birth rates among teenagers and the lower classes continues to fall, while women with higher incomes and higher education are having more children. As a result, university students in the future will be less likely to have to rely on loans.

=== Environment ===
Carbon emissions reduction due to various lifestyle choices

Some demographers have suggested that a declining birth rate may have net positive effects on the country. Many environmentalists see this trend more optimistically because it could help combat the perceived problem of overpopulation. Only about a third of Americans expressed concerned over their nation's falling birth rates while just under half were worried that population growth would lead to the depletion of natural resources and more children living in poverty.

Having fewer children has been shown to be an effective way to reduce environmental impact through reduced carbon footprint and higher populations could increase the effects of climate change in the future. Having an expanding population of people who live longer and are wealthier may not be sustainable. Though the details remain debated, in the 2020s, growing numbers of couples have cited climate change as a reason for having fewer or not having children at all. However, personal independence remains the top reason.

=== Geopolitics ===
Many of America's allies—Canada, the United Kingdom, the European Union, Japan, South Korea, Australia, and New Zealand—are themselves aging. For that reason, they would struggle to finance their own defense and would become even more dependent on the United States at a time when U.S. demographic advantage is fading. Indeed, while the U.S. maintained a fertility advantage over other developed nations during the 1990s and 2000s, this edge faded away during the 2010s.

To combat this problem, the U.S. needs to improve ties with emerging economies, such as the Philippines, Indonesia, and India, though some of these countries are already in the process of transitioning towards an aging society. The combined GDP of the United States and its allies has shrunk from 77% of the global economy in 2002 to just 56% in 2021, and this trend will likely continue. Furthermore, an aging population will reduce the ability of the United States to participate in global affairs the way it once did.

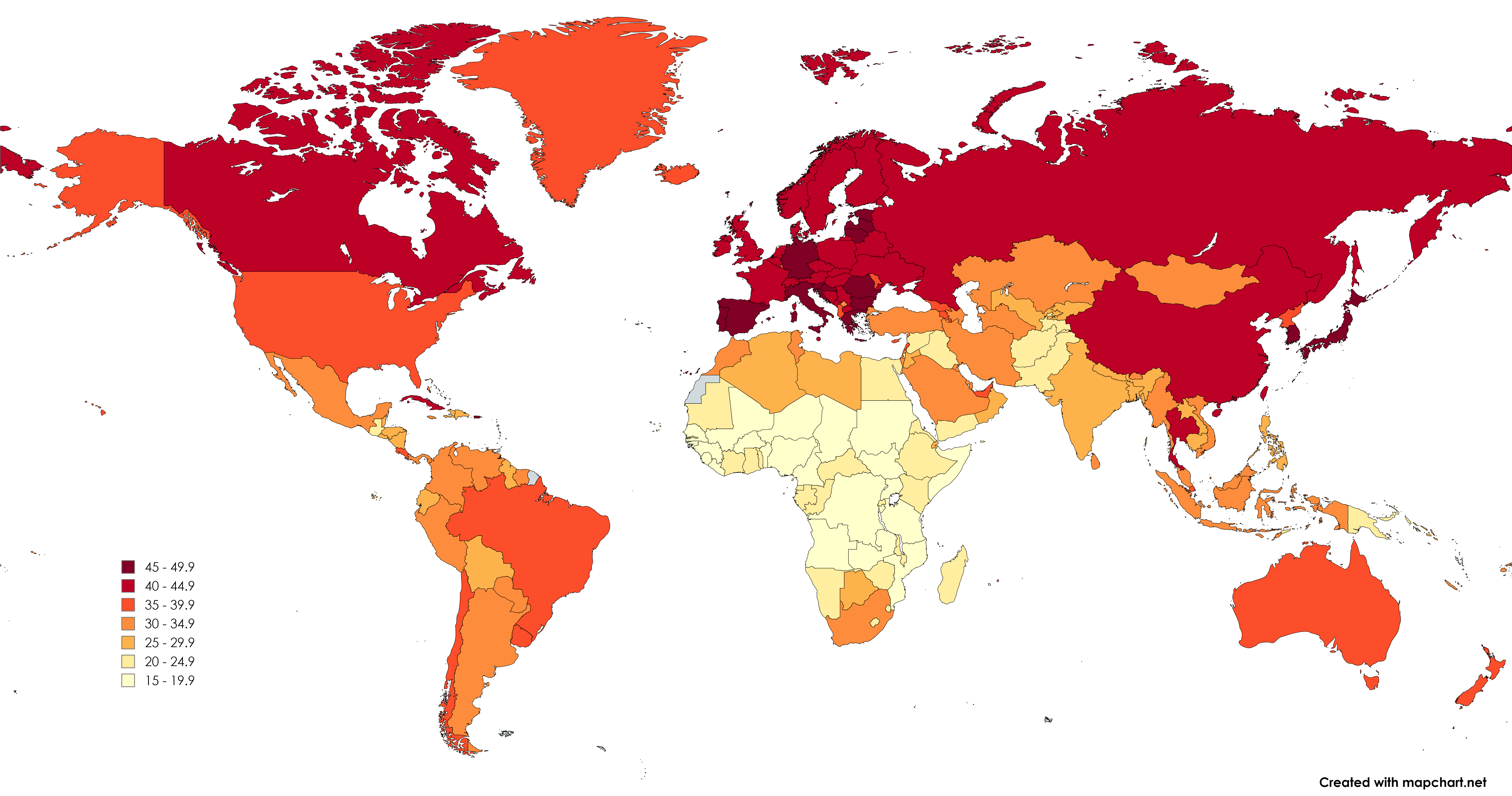
Median age by country in 2024 (CIA World Factbook). The United States is aging more slowly than many of its allies and adversaries around the world.

Nevertheless, because the United States is aging more slowly than any one of its main rivals, it will have an advantage in any future geopolitical contests. Given current demographic trends, it is unlikely that the United States will lose its dominant position to China and Russia. However, if international confidence in the national currency and public finances of the United States were damaged, the nation would lose its geopolitical clout and global influence.

China has a low fertility rate compared to the United States. As of 2023, China's median age has exceeded America's and the Chinese population has already begun to decline since 2022. China's number of people over 65 as a share of the population is predicted to exceed that of the United States by around 2035. Furthermore, the United States has an advantage that China lacks—immigration. While the U.S. remains an attractive place for immigrants, very few would like to move to China, and China has become much more hostile towards foreigners in the 2020s. In fact, projections of China's economic growth from the early 2020s taking into account China's population aging, among other problems facing the nation, tend to delay the date at which China's economy will surpass America's. Even if China were to overtake the United States, the latter would soon reclaim its position. On the other hand, the United States does not offer talented immigrants an easy path towards permanent residency or citizenship.

By one estimate, China's rate of GDP growth will be below America's by the 2030s because its dependency ratio will exceed America's. On one hand, China's demographic decline relative to the U.S. could prompt it to undertake more risky actions, for example with regards to the issue of Taiwanese independence. On the other hand, continued U.S. superiority might deter adversaries from taking military actions against either the U.S. or its allies. A "geriatric peace" might be at hand, as the graying powers have an incentive to cooperate in order to maintain the global order before their demographic realities prevent them from doing so.

=== Occupational safety ===
Because of the many older adults opting to remain in the U.S. workforce, many studies have been done to investigate whether the older workers are at greater risk of occupational injury than their younger counterparts. Due to the physical declines associated with aging, older adults tend to exhibit losses in eyesight, hearing and physical strength. Data shows that older adults have low overall injury rates compared to all age groups, but are more likely to suffer from fatal and more severe occupational injuries. Of all fatal occupational injuries in 2005, older workers accounted for 26.4%, despite only comprising 16.4% of the workforce at the time. Age increases in fatality rates in occupational injury are more pronounced for workers over the age of 65. The return to work for older workers is also extended; older workers experience a greater median number of lost work days and longer recovery times than younger workers. Some common occupational injuries and illnesses for older workers include arthritis and fractures. Among older workers, hip fractures are a large concern, given the severity of these injuries. Although food and incidental exposure to sunlight normally provide healthy adults with sufficient vitamin D, most Americans tend to not have enough in their daily intakes.

=== Social welfare and healthcare ===
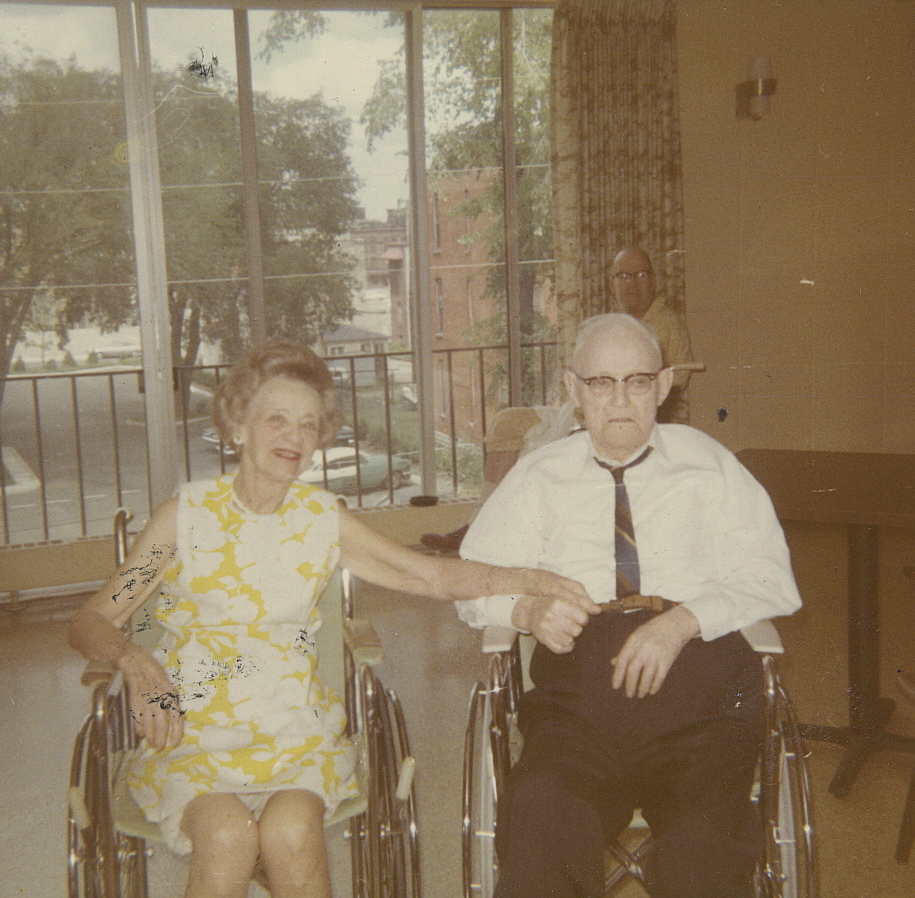
Unlike in the past, senior Americans in the twenty-first century generally expect to work after turning 65.

An aging population has implications for social-welfare programs. The U.S. federal social security system functions through collecting payroll taxes to support older citizens. It is possible that a smaller workforce, coupled with increased numbers of longer-living elderly, may have a negative impact on the social security system. The Social Security Administration (SSA) estimates that the dependency ratio (people ages 65+ divided by people ages 20–64) in 2080 will be over 40%, compared to the 20% in 2005. SSA data shows one out of every four 65-year-olds today will live past the age of 90, while one out of 10 will live past 95. Indeed, 60% of baby boomers are more worried about outliving their savings than dying. Rising life expectancy may result in reductions in social security benefits, devaluing private and public pension programs. Were there to be a reduction or elimination of programs such as social security and Medicare, many may need to delay retirement and to continue working.

In 2018, 29% of Americans aged 65–72 remained active in the labor force, according to the Pew Research Center, as Americans generally expect to continue to work after turning 65. The baby boomers who chose to remain in the work force after the age of 65 tended to be university graduates, whites, and urban residents. That the boomers maintained a relatively high labor participation rate made economic sense because the longer they postpone retirement, the more Social Security benefits they could claim, once they finally retire. However, given current trends (2023), U.S. federal expenditure on programs for the elderly will equal spending on education, research and development, transportation, and national defense combined by 2033. This compounds the problem of soaring public debt.

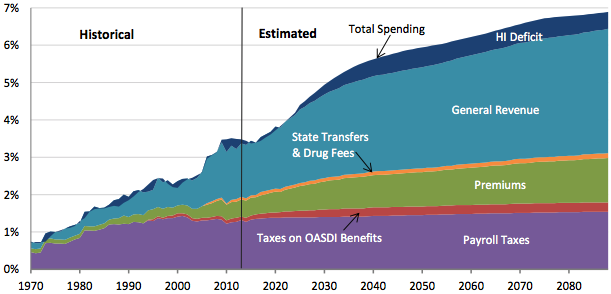
Medicare cost and non-interest income by source as a percentage of GDP as of 2014

By 2030, 20% of Americans are predicted to be past the age of retirement, which could pose a burden to the healthcare system. Older and retired people tend to need more health services, which must be provided by their younger counterparts, so some demographers have theorized that this could have a negative impact on the country. Experts suggest that the number of geriatricians will have to triple to meet the demands of the rising elderly. Demand for other healthcare professionals, such as nurses, occupational therapists, physical therapists and dentists is also projected to rise, as well as for common geriatric healthcare needs, such as medications, joint replacements and cardiovascular operations. Between 1966 and 2023, the number of people qualified for Medicare tripled to nearly 65 million, with 10 million seniors and disabled people being added to the system from 2013 to 2023.

In the early 2020s, among Americans aged 65 or older, 14% of all expenditures goes to healthcare, compared to 8% for the general population. While some enjoy living by themselves, others suffer from physical or mental health issues being socially isolated. Osteoporosis and osteopenia (bone loss) are a common occurrence among American women aged 50 and over, though not among men. Arthritis, cancer, diabetes, obesity, and cognitive issues are among the most common issues faced by Americans over the age of 65. Older adults who have worked in the construction industry have shown high rates of chronic diseases. But medical innovations have curbed the rising cost of healthcare by making it cheaper to achieve the same results as before.

Between the late 2010s and early 2020s, Millennials and Generation Z joined the workforce in large numbers, allowing the U.S. to maintain a relatively large tax base, alleviating concerns over the financial sustainability of various social-welfare programs. Furthermore, because American welfare programs are less generous than Europe's, they are also less vulnerable to demographic shifts. Nevertheless, in 2023, both Medicare and Social Security as they stand are projected to run out of funds by the late 2020s and mid-2030s, respectively. With the Inflation Reduction Act of 2022, the Joe Biden administration sought to curb the cost of medical care by allowing Medicare to negotiate lower costs for certain drugs and treatments, such as insulin. In general, though, few American politicians want to prioritize improving the nation's life expectancy, which is relatively low compared to other developed countries. Those who do disagree on how to achieve the intended results, and some proposals, such as restrictions on the consumption of cigarettes and sugary drinks, have triggered a backlash.

=== Society ===
Population aging can potentially change American society as a whole. Many companies use a system, in which older, tenured workers get raises and benefits over time, eventually hitting retirement. With larger numbers of older workers in the workforce, this model might be unsustainable. In addition, perceptions of older adults in society will change, as the elderly are living longer lives and more active than before. Changing from a youth-focused culture to having a more positive attitude towards aging and being more respectful of seniors like Japan can help elderly Americans extend their life span and live out their sunset years in dignity. American society will have to confront the negative stereotypes of aging and ageism. In order to win elections, politicians will have to be more attentive towards the elderly. Age discrimination is a major concern for retirees looking to return to the workforce. Businesses might be reluctant to hire them, thinking that they struggle with problem-solving or with new technologies, even though this is not necessarily true.

In his work on elite overproduction, social scientist Peter Turchin notes that because given U.S. demographic realities, the youth bulge would likely not fade away before the 2020s, making this time period prone to sociopolitical turbulence.

== Proposed solutions ==
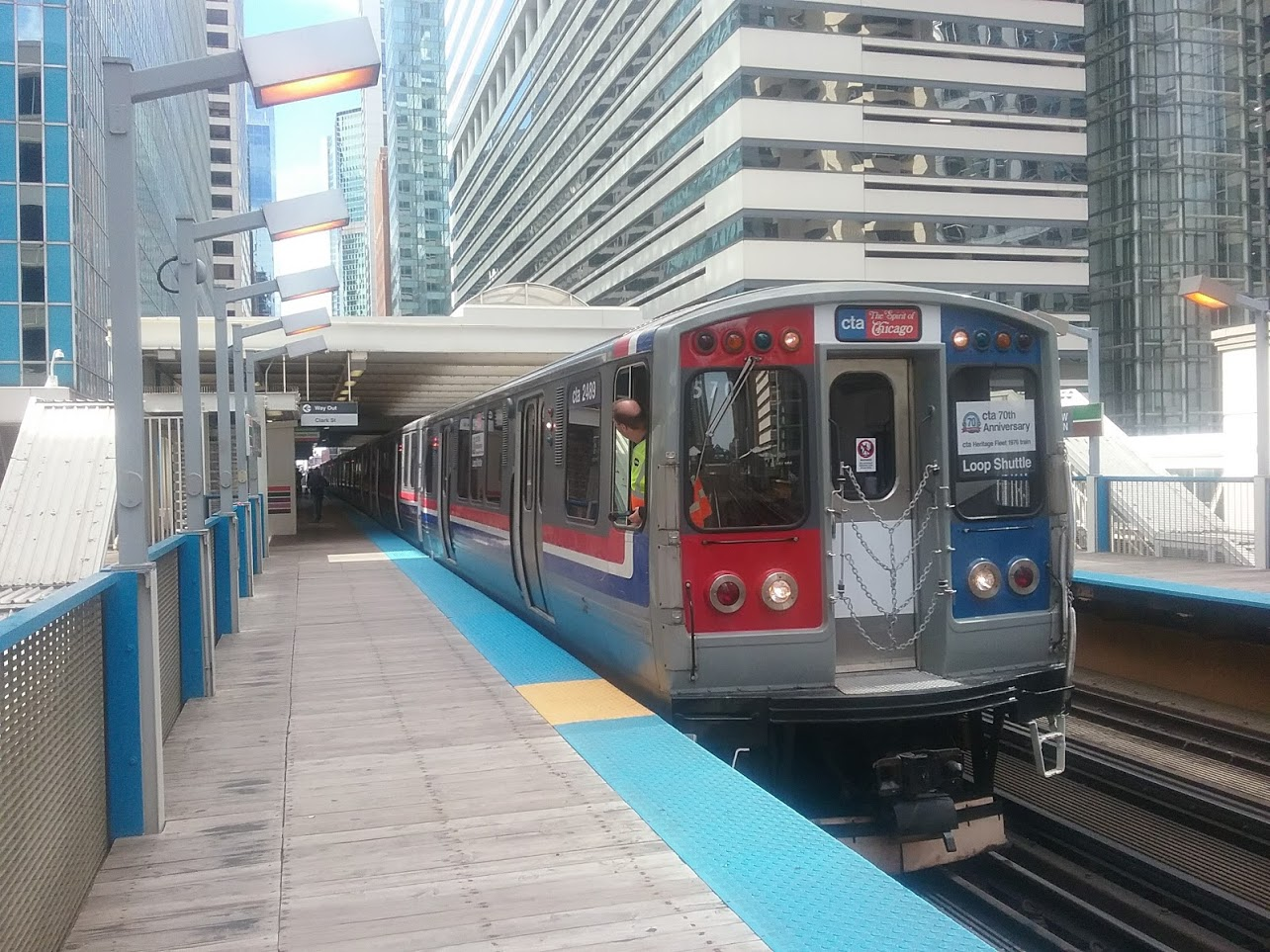
Cities could make themselves friendlier towards the elderly by improving their mass transit networks.

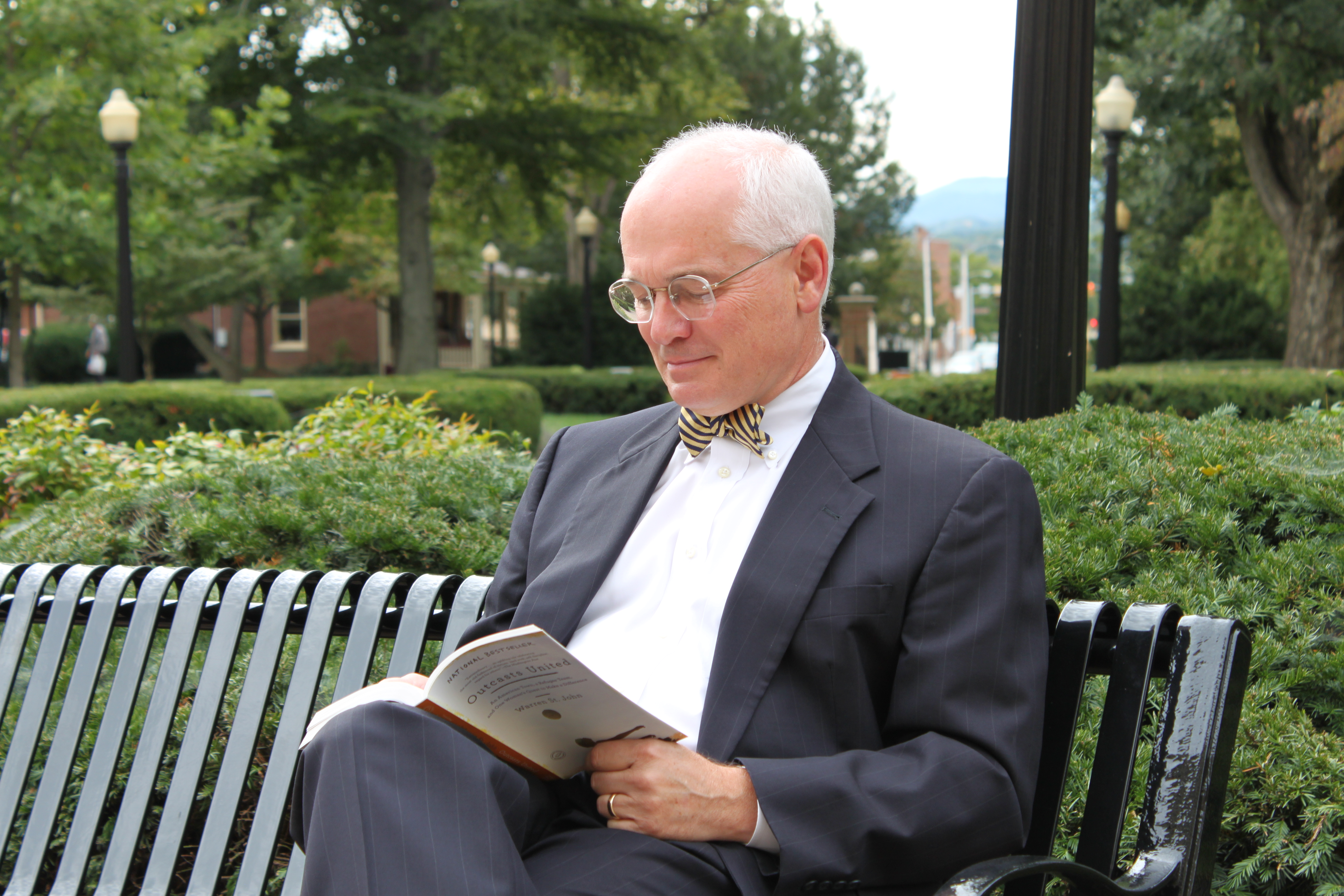
Maintaining an active mind contributes towards healthy aging.

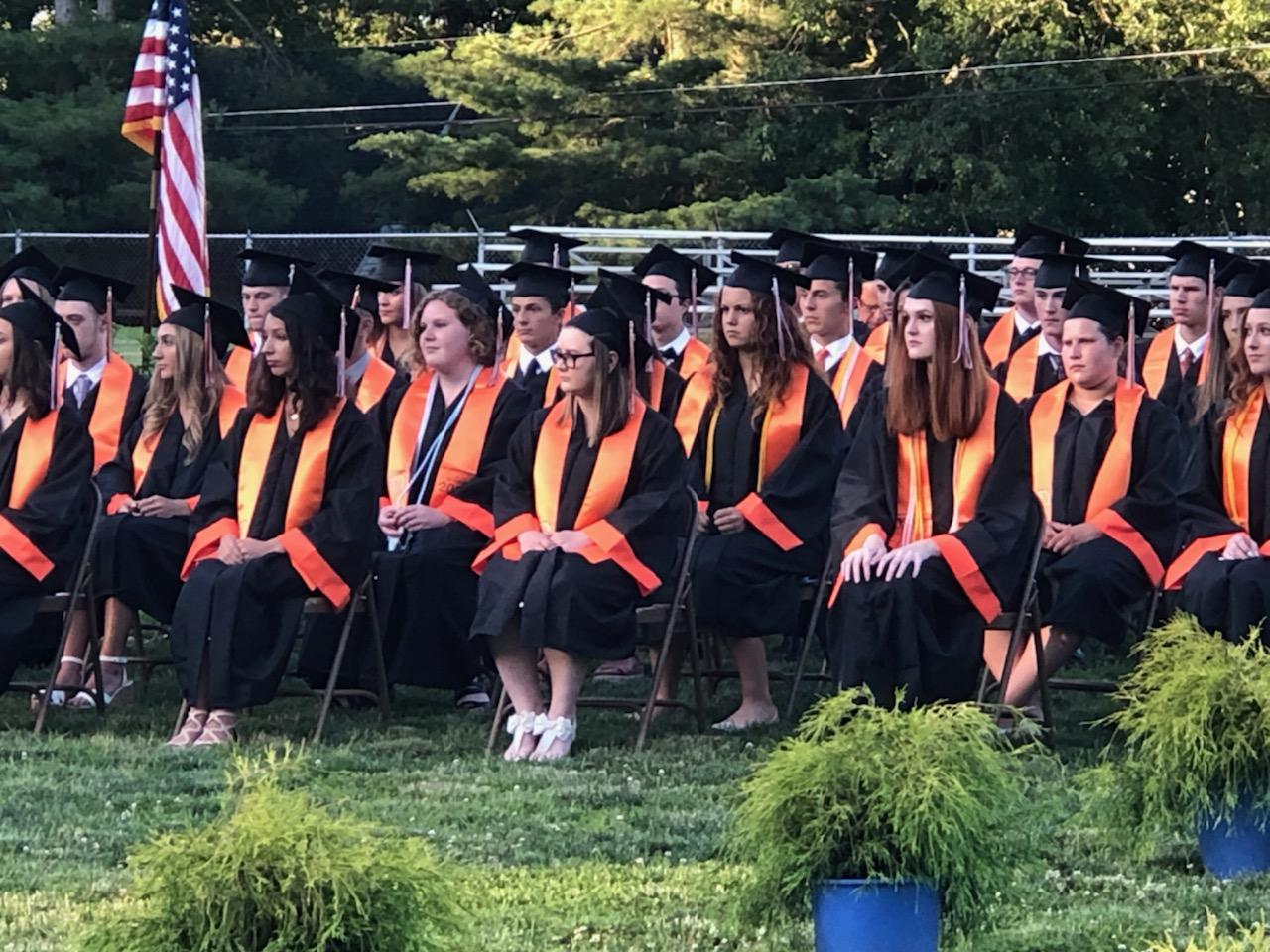
Investing in human capital could help offset population aging.

=== Services and programs for seniors ===
Cities could render themselves friendlier towards the elderly, for example by improving public transit, promoting healthy lifestyle choices (physical activities, learning, and social engagement), adding green spaces and recreational facilities. Initiatives such as communal grandparenting programs, found in Finland, could help engage the elderly on one hand and help young people on the other. In Southeast Asia, self-help clubs offer seniors opportunities for friendship and social activities. In Zimbabwe, the elderly are recruit to help younger people handle mental-health issues. (Those with serious problems are referred to professionals.)

To deal with the increased demand that could be placed on the healthcare system, telehealth and virtual health monitoring has arisen as a way to help support a larger population of older adults. The Congressional Budget Office (CBO) has proposed 60 different policy options on how to save billions of dollars on Medicare, such as raising monthly premiums. As of 2023, members of Congress are considering various options to salvage Medicare and Social Security, such as addressing fraud in the Medicare Advantage program and raising the ages of legibility for Medicare and Social Security.

Unfortunately, neither raising taxes nor cutting services is politically palatable, something both major parties have learned from experience. Public debt stood at 117% of GDP in 2023, and is projected by the CBO to exceed 150% by mid-century. As has already been done in a number of European countries, the United States could streamline the process of tracking retirement savings, or 401(k). In Japan, a national long-term-care insurance policy was introduced in 2000.

=== Education and technology ===
Investing in technological and human-capital development in order to enhance productivity might help the United States offset some of the economic effects of population aging. Population size or birth rate is not the sole, or even the main, determinant of productivity. Although the pace of innovation might slow, all else being equal, improving education could help the country employ its dwindling number of young people more gainfully.

=== Economic reforms ===
Raising the retirement age, further automation, and encouraging higher labor participation rates among women could help alleviate the labor shortage, with the latter successfully done in Japan in the 2010s. Policies aimed at raising workforce participation among those of prime working age in general is another potential solution, as are giving older people incentives to continue working in appropriate sectors where there is a labor shortage, such as teaching, and recruiting former convicts.

Some states have relaxed restriction on child labor, but, like immigration, this has proven to be controversial.

=== Family policies ===
Alternatively, some people have advocated for offering more paid parental leave and subsidies for child care, thereby encouraging people to have more children. These policies have already been employed in other areas of the world, but with limited results at best. In a few countries, they did succeed in raising the fertility rate, but only marginally, and at a significant cost. While they may help people who want children to have them, they do not necessarily make them want to have more. Moreover, such programs tend to be used mostly by professional women, whose fertility rates tend to be stable over the decades, while there is no evidence that working-class American women want to have more children. It is therefore unlikely that similarly pro-natalist policies would work in the U.S. In fact, since the 1980s, the United States has, like many other countries, instituted a number of family-friendly policies, though at a more modest pace, and yet the country maintains a relative high fertility rate despite not having social welfare programs that are as generous as some other developed countries.

=== Immigration ===
Some have argued that reduced immigration will have a larger impact on population growth than the declining birth rate. Immigration has historically been a source of growth for the US, and some have suggested that it could slow or reverse the trend of population aging or decline. However, studies have shown that immigrants from countries with high-fertility rates often have fewer children when they immigrate to a country where small families are the norm, and this patterns also holds in the U.S. It has also been shown that low-birth rates and sudden increases in immigration often lead to increased levels of populism and xenophobia. Arguments in favor of increasing immigration to combat declining population levels have sparked outcry from some right-wing political factions in the United States and some European countries. In the United States, past episodes of domestic turmoil have led to moratoriums on immigration. Furthermore, critics argue that the United States today struggles to integrate the various different ethnic groups already living in the country alongside new immigrants. Political scientist Robert Putnam argues that ethnic and cultural diversity has its downsides in the form of declining cultural capital, falling civic participation, lower general social trust, and greater social fragmentation. Since 1996, there have been numerous failed attempts to introduce comprehensive immigration reforms, and while many continue to view immigration as a net benefit to the nation, the American people remain mixed on whether or not they support more immigration in general. Mass migration is politically problematic.

Still, high-skilled immigration, the type of immigration that tends to expand the tax base the most, as has been done in Canada, can help. In fact, the U.S. currently faces a shortage of high-skilled workers in STEM, and foreign talents must navigate difficult hurdles in order to immigrate. About three quarters of foreign alumni of American universities would like to stay after graduation. Meanwhile, some other countries, such as Canada and the United Kingdom, have introduced programs to attract talents at the expense of the United States. Without immigration, the American population could start shrinking as soon as 2031, according to a 2025 projection by the Congressional Budget Office.

== See also ==
- Aging of Australia
- Aging of Canada
- Aging of China
- Aging of Europe
- Aging of Japan
- Aging of South Korea
