= Retirement in Europe =

Average effective age of retirement for men, 1970 to 2018. Estimates are based on a weighted average of changes in labour force participation rates by age, for workers 40+

Retirement age differs in European countries and is a matter of debate across Europe because of an aging population.

== Retirement age by country ==
Retirement age in Europe
Country	Men	Women	Year	Notes	References
Albania	65	61	2020		
Austria	65	60	2018	In Austria the retirement age for women is to be equalized to the retirement age for men (65) by 2033.	
Belarus	62.5	57.5	2021	By 2022, the age will be 63 for men and 58 for women.	
Belgium	66		2025	In Belgium, the retirement age is to be increased gradually to 67 years by 2030.	
Bosnia and Herzegovina	65		2024		
Bulgaria	64 (and 7 months)	62 (and 2 months)	2024	In Bulgaria the retirement age for women is to be equalized to the retirement age for men (65) by 2037.	
Croatia	65	63 (and 6 months)	2024	In Croatia the retirement age for women is to be equalized to the retirement age for men (65) by 2030.	
Cyprus	65		2018		
Czech Republic	63 (and 4 months)	58 (and 8 months) – 62 (and 8 months)	2018	In the Czech Republic, in the year 2015, men had the retirement age of 62 years and 10 months and women had it between 58 and 62, depending on number of children. In Czech Republic, the retirement age is in the process of being increased, and therefore depends on year of birth (for individuals born after 1977 it may exceed even 67. e.g. a person born in year 1995 must be at least 70 years old.) For women the retirement age depends on the number of raised children as well. For people born in 1975, the retirement age will be the same (66y8m) regardless of sex and number of children raised; and this age will reach 67 for people born in 1977.	
Denmark	67		2024	See also: Pensions in Denmark From 2030 onwards, retirement age will be linked to life expectancy. From 2040 to 2045 the state retirement age was set to 70.	
Estonia	64 (and 9 months)		2019	In Estonia the retirement age is to be increased gradually to 65 years by 2026. After 2026 it will be linked to the average life expectancy.	
Finland	65		2008		
France	62 to 67		2022	Depends on the duration of contribution (minimum 43 years)	
Germany	65 (rising to 67 by 2031)		2025	In Germany the retirement age is being increased and will gradually rise to 67 by 2031.	
Greece	67		2015		
Hungary	65		2022	Women with 40 years of insurance can retire at any age.	
Iceland	67		2018		
Ireland	66		2024	In Ireland there is no general mandatory retirement age, although some jobs, such as jobs in law enforcement or firefighting, may be subject to a statutory retirement age. Employers may define their own retirement age but the state pension is not available to those younger than 66. The longer an individual postpones withdrawing the pension, the greater the weekly state pension payment, up to age 70.	
Italy	67		2019	Must have paid contributions for at least 20 years. Those who have paid contributions for at least 38 years can retire at 64. Those who have paid contributions for at least 41 years and 10 months (women) or 42 years and 10 months (men) can retire regardless of age.	
Latvia	65		2025		
Liechtenstein	65		2018		
Lithuania	64 (and 10 months)	64 (and 8 months)	2023	In Lithuania, the retirement age will be 65 for both men and women by 2026.	
Luxembourg	65		2018		
Malta	62		2015	In Malta the retirement age is to be increased gradually to 65 years by 2027.	
Moldova	63	59	2020	Retirement age for women is increasing every 6 months until it reaches 63 years in 2028.	
Montenegro	66	64	2022		
Netherlands	67		2025	The state pension for all elderly is being increased gradually and in 2028 the state pension age will be raised again, to 67 years and 3 months. For men and women born after 1 January 1999 the expected retirement age is 70 years old. After 2022 it is linked to the average life expectancy.	
North Macedonia	64	62	2011		
Norway	67		2018	See also: Pensions in Norway The general retirement age is currently set to age 67, however, given sufficient pension contributions it is possible to retire as early as at age 62. The longer an individual postpones withdrawing a pension, the greater the government pension provision becomes.	
Poland	65	60	2016		
Portugal	66 (and 7 months)		2025		
Romania	65	61	2019	The age for women is being increased gradually. It will reach 63 by 2030.	
Russia	63	58	2024	From 2019 the retirement age for men (women) would gradually increase from 60 (55) to 65 (60) years by 2028; first it was intended to hike the age for women to 63 but later the plan was softened.	
Serbia	65	63 (and 8 months)	2024	By the year of 2032 retirement age for women will equalize with men and reach 65. Also it is possible to gain pension after 45 years of labour if that happens prior to 66th year of life for men or aged 61 years and 6 months for women. It would be at least 60 for both men and women, considering the fact that person is legally labour-eligible aged 15 in Serbia.	
Slovakia	64		2021		
Slovenia	65		2018		
Spain	66 (and 8 months)		2025	The age will be 67 by 2027. See also: Pensions in Spain.	
Sweden	66		2020, options age 62–68.	By 2026 it will be 67, with options age 64-69.	
Switzerland	65	64	2022		
Ukraine	60		2022		
United Kingdom	66		2021	The retirement age is due to be increased to 67 by 2028 and 68 by 2046. See also: Pensions in the United Kingdom.	

== Public pension adequacy ==
A 2026 study conducted by DataPulse Research compared average gross public old age pensions with modeled annual consumption expenditure for people aged 60 and over across 30 European countries, using Eurostat data adjusted to 2023 price levels, to estimate the difference between state pension income and typical retiree spending. Research reported that a negative pension to expenditure difference does not necessarily correspond to a higher risk of poverty among older people. In several cases, including Norway and Luxembourg, where state pensions fall short of estimated spending while measured poverty risk among older adults remains comparatively low, which it attributed to the role of occupational pensions and private savings in those systems. Housing related costs represent a substantial share of retirement expenditure, and homeownership can materially affect how far a given pension stretches. In countries with larger renter shares among older residents such as Germany and Austria, changes in housing and utility costs may have a larger impact on pension adequacy than in higher ownership countries such as Romania.

Average gross public pension compared with estimated annual expenditure (2023)
Country or group	Average gross public pension (€)	Estimated annual expenditure (€)	Difference vs expenditure (%)
Romania	5800	4772	+21
Czech Republic	10100	8600	+18
Poland	8400	8100	+4
Spain	19844	19300	+3
Bulgaria	4479	4558	-2
Denmark	30543	32900	-7
Latvia	6500	7500	-13
Greece	12900	14900	-14
Italy	21100	24800	-15
Austria	25900	31000	-17
Portugal	11500	13800	-17
Estonia	8400	10100	-17
Sweden	22700	27300	-17
Malta	11000	13300	-17
Netherlands	25400	30800	-18
Finland	22800	27800	-18
Belgium	24200	30300	-20
EU-27 average	17321	21700	-20
France	19756	25700	-23
Montenegro	4600	6100	-25
Serbia	4239	5600	-25
Ireland	24000	32300	-25
Slovakia	5700	8100	-30
Cyprus	12800	19000	-33
Germany	19138	28700	-33
Luxembourg	34413	52168	-34
Lithuania	6000	9100	-34
Norway	29176	46100	-37
Hungary	6100	9800	-38
Slovenia	9400	15500	-39
Croatia	5600	9300	-40

== See also ==
- Pension
- Retirement
- Ageing of Europe
- Demographics of Europe
- Population decline
- Survey of Health, Ageing and Retirement in Europe
