= Japanese blue collar workers =

Manual laborers in Japan

Blue collar workers in Japan (Japanese: ブルーカラー労働者 or 肉体労働者) encompass many different types of manual labor jobs, including factory work, construction, and agriculture. Blue-collar workers make up a very large portion of the labor force in Japan, with 30.1% of employed people ages 15 and over working as "craftsman, mining, manufacturing and construction workers and laborers" as of 1995 census data. The blue-collar class includes regular, non-regular, and part-time workers, as well as a large number of foreign laborers, all with varying work schedules and employment benefits.

== Factory workers in Japan ==
=== History of industrialization ===
Most Japanese people prior to the Meiji Restoration worked in the agriculture industry (approximately 70-80 percent), and although some examples of organized production were present in Japanese communities, the lack of modern technology and capital prevented industrial factory work from emerging on a large scale. Blue-collar workers grew into a substantial class as the Meiji period drove industrialization; the newly reformed government invested in the creation of factories and sold them to merchant groups, who helped expand the industry and create economic growth. Initially, these factory workers consisted of young (not first-born) men and women who came from agrarian communities.

The onset of the Russo-Japanese War, and then later World War I, led to Japanese factories increasing production for military equipment, resulting in more blue-collar workers being employed. During this period, the amount of permanent male laborers in industry began to outnumber their female counterparts. The larger factory labor force gave a greater voice to these workers, calling attention to labor issues such as low wages and lack of training. To reduce labor turnover, employers at large firms instilled better standards that were previously only available to staff (white collar) workers, increasing wages and career training opportunities for male manual laborers, and adding welfare facilities for them to use. World War II continued to make Japan's industrialization process stronger, though the ceasefire in 1945 caused many factory workers to be laid off, in part leading to a strong wave of labor unionism in Japan. Support for labor unionism helped secure better working conditions for blue-collar factory workers after WWII, as well as create substantial economic growth.

=== Social status ===
In the past, it was common for factory workers to only have completed compulsory education (being 6 years of primary school and 3 years of secondary school), however beginning in the late 1960's more large firms began requiring high school education for employment due to young people becoming more interested in continuing schooling. Industrial high schools in Japan constitute one of the more popular types of vocational high schools attended by aspiring blue-collar workers, however job-specific skills are still largely taught by companies themselves while schools focus primarily on general development.

When factories were first introduced, a payment system based on seniority was put in place, though only for staff workers. Around the turn of the 20th century, the growth of industry and rising profitability required more labor, therefore the seniority-based payment system was expanded to include manual laborers as well, so young workers are underpaid while older workers, expected to soon retire, are overpaid. Non-regular, part-time, or foreign workers within factories do not fall into this same remuneration structure, despite becoming an increasingly large part of the Japanese labor market in recent years.

The perception of factory workers and blue-collar workers at large within Japanese culture can be considered in the context of the salaryman stereotype and a growing sentiment of neoliberalism. The salaryman archetype positions a hard-working white-collar man as the optimal kind of laborer in Japanese society, and more recently the government has also promoted a neoliberal message that encourages workers to support themselves independently without outside support. Many Japanese workers, including many factory workers, do not fall into these categories, therefore they often occupy a lower status in the social conscience. As some polling reveals, factory work in Japan is viewed positively by certain groups due to its low-stress working conditions and few skill requirements, however the extent to which this sentiment is held across the country is unknown.

=== Health issues ===
Factory work in Japan has been found to have some negative health impacts on workers, both physical and mental. In the 1970's, karōshi (worked to death) was identified as a labor issue that affected both white and blue-collar workers, and by 2005, a law was put in place that offered health guidance to overworked people, in order to help lower the deaths caused by karoshi. Overwork and worker exploitation remain problems in Japan, though other health issues connected to work differ between factory workers and other industries. Japanese factory workers have been found to experience faster decline in their physical abilities as they age compared to white-collar workers, who more often experience conditions such as diabetes due to their work style.

== Foreign workers ==
Japan has seen an increase in the number of foreign workers in the economy over the past decade, attributed to the country's policy to bring in more high-skilled workers from overseas and blue-collar workers to help fix the ongoing labor shortage. In the agricultural sector, foreign workers have become an increasingly important source of labor, especially in fruit and vegetable production. The Technical Intern Training Program is the primary method by which foreign agricultural workers gain temporary employment in Japan, though a visa program introduced in 2020 gives another option for this kind of temporary work. Through these programs, foreigners have become an inexpensive source of labor for Japanese farms, since neither offer very high wages or benefits.

== See also ==
- Japanese work environment
- Blue collar workers
- Labor Market of Japan
