= Labor market of Japan =

Labor force of Japan, current and future

Unemployment rate of Japan

In 2010, Japan had a labor force of 65.9 million people, representing 59.6% of the aged 15 years and older. Among them, 62.57 million were employed, while 3.34 million were unemployed, yielding an unemployment rate of 5.1%. The structure of Japan's labor market experienced gradual change in the late 1980s and continued this trend throughout the 1990s. The structure of the labor market is affected by:

1. Shrinking population
2. Replacement of postwar baby boom generation
3. Increasing numbers of women in the labor force
4. Workers' rising education level
5. Increase in the number of foreign nationals in the labor force is foreseen

In 2019, Japan had the lowest unemployment rate and the highest employment rate among the G7 countries.

By 2021 the size of the labor force changed to 68.60 million, a decrease of 0.08 million from the previous year. Viewing by sex, the male labor force was 38.03 million, a decrease of 0.20 million, and the female labor force was 30.57 million, an increase of 0.13 million. The percentage of employed people increased to 62.1% from that of 59.6% in 2010. Breaking it by sex, the ratio of employed males was 71.3%, a decrease of 0.1 percent points from the previous year, and the ratio of the labor force of females was 53.5%, an increase of 0.3 percent points.

In 2021, the labor force aged 15-64 was 59.31 million, a decrease of 0.15 million. Viewing by sex, the male labor force aged 15-64 was 32.52 million, a decrease of 0.20 million, and the female labor force aged 15-64 was 26.79 million, an increase of 0.06 million.

The labor force participation rate of those aged 15-64 was 80.1%, an increase of 0.5 percent points. Viewing by sex, the participation rate of males aged 15-64 was 86.7%, an increase of 0.2 percent points.

== Character ==
The basic Japanese employment structure is known as "Simultaneous recruiting of new graduates" and "ranking hierarchy", which includes seniority wages and lifetime employment. It allows employees to learn broad skills to achieve in long-term perspective through job rotation and on-the-job training which is likely to be firm-specific. Since Japanese firms develop firm-specific skills throughout long-term employment, it is difficult to enter the internal labor market which is only open to new graduates from high school or university, or those who can be competitive in the market with their special qualification or knowledge. This internal market worked well in Japanese firms.

However, Japan has shifted to US-type regulation and capitalism after the burst of economic bubble, and Japanese firms have introduced two developments: 1) performance-related pay, and 2) non-regular employment such as part-time, temporary and hiring through human resource agencies.

Performance-related pay requires short-term evaluation of employees' performance, which means that wage could reflect immediate job performance rather than the skills over the long-term. This could have negative effect on the long-term development. It was suggested that this system cannot be efficacious for typical Japanese firms where skill-based wages motivate employees to gain experience and build their abilities. However, the notion of non-regular employment was introduced by the employer's association Nikkeiren and has been promoted since the 1990s. The principal reason of innovation in flexible staffing is not for flexibility but economizing labor costs. Non-regular employees are common in the retailing and restaurant sectors: 44.3% in retailing and 63.4% in restaurant/hotel industry compared to 17.7% in construction and 21.4% in manufacturing industry in 2004.

== Demographic impact ==
Labor force participation rate (15-64 age) in Japan, by sex

Gender wage gap in OECD

Japan is now facing a shortage of labor caused by two major demographic problems: a shrinking population because of a low fertility rate, which was 1.4 per woman in 2009, and replacement of the postwar generation which is the biggest population range who are now around retirement age. Employers find hiring a big challenge because of the labor shortage, together with the risk aversion nature of Japanese people. These challenges multiply if the company does not have a big brand name or wishes to hire bilingual people with Japanese and English language skills.

The population aged over 15 to 64 years old is 63.7% (80,730 thousand people) of the total population; most of them are considered as productive population who work and support those who are too old or too young to work, while the percentage of the population aged 65 and over is 23.1% of the total population in 2011 Based on service-volume estimates in prefectural plans under Japan’s ninth Long-Term Care Insurance Plan, the Ministry of Health, Labour and Welfare estimated that 2.40 million care workers would be needed in fiscal 2026 and 2.72 million in fiscal 2040, compared with 2.15 million in fiscal 2022. The Ministry of Health, Labour and Welfare counted 2,126,227 care workers across the covered services on 1 October 2024, 487 more than a year earlier.

Recently, Japan has seriously considered introducing "foreign workers" to the nation twice. The first was in the late 1980s, when there was the labor shortage because of the economic boom, however it was forgotten when the economy worsened. The second started in 1999 since the labor shortage caused by demographic change.

According to Shinzo Abe in Davos in 2019, while Japan's labor force decreased by 4.5 million in the past six years, the employment of women and elderly people each increased by 2 million. With a shortage of work force, Japan has been trying to supplement the labor market with higher female participation. Socially, Japanese society has been reversing the traditional norms of domestic housewives, as more and more women are encouraged to work. Institutionally, Japanese government has been making efforts to close the wage gap and offer better family policies, as part of womenomics proposed under Prime Minister Shinzo Abe in 2013. Employment wise, female labor-participation rate has gone up from 62.7% in 1997, to 70.1% in 2015. Yet a significant portion of female workers are participating in low wage and part-time jobs, while the wage gap was still the third highest in OECD countries in 2017 and women still felt limited in career development.

Another changing demographic of Japanese labor market is higher elder participation. As the share of population 65 and above jumped from 10% in 1990 to 26.6 percent in 2015, the elderly component of the workforce rose from 7.8% in 2006 to 11.8% in 2016. On one hand, many elders are retired workers that are rehired to the work force as an irregular employee, which account for the majority of workers between 65 and 69. On the other hand, the regular and irregular employee structure can limit potentially higher elder participation, as "irregular" positions can be insecure and lower paying. As many elders still need to supplement their post-retirement income, the aged worker participation may continue to rise, as 42% of employees above 60 suggest they would like to continue working as long as able.

== Workers' changing attitudes ==
The success of corporations in Japan has been attributed to the remarkable motivation of its workers, as well as their strong sense of loyalty to and identification with their employers. While many theories have evolved to explain the attitudes of Japanese workers, perhaps the most noteworthy is that of personnel management. This view holds that loyalty to the company has developed as a result of job security and a wage system in which those with the greatest seniority reap the highest rewards. Such corporate structure presumably fostered not only a determined interest in the company but also a low percentage of workers who changed jobs.

During the postwar economic reconstruction, the backbone of the labor force was, of course, made up of people born before World War II. These people grew up in a Japan that was still largely an agriculturally based economy and had little material wealth. Moreover, they had suffered the hardships of war and had accepted hard work as a part of their lives. In the late twentieth century, these people were being replaced by generations born after the war, and there were indications that the newcomers had different attitudes toward work. Postwar generations were accustomed to prosperity and were also better educated than their elders.

As might be expected, these socioeconomic changes have affected workers' attitudes. Prior to World War II, surveys indicated that the aspect of life regarded as most worthwhile was work. During the 1980s, the percentage of people who felt this way was declining. Workers' identification with their employers was weakening as well. A survey by the Management and Coordination Agency revealed that a record 2.7 million workers changed jobs in the one-year period beginning October 1, 1986, and the ratio of those who switched jobs to the total labor force matched the previous high recorded in 1974 (one year after the first oil crisis). This survey also showed that the percentage of workers indicating an interest in changing jobs increased from 4.5 percent in 1971 to 9.9 percent in 1987.

Another indication of changing worker attitudes is the number of people meeting with corporate scouts to discuss the possibility of switching jobs. Corporations' treatment of older workers also affects attitudes: there are fewer positions for older workers, and many find themselves without the rewards that their predecessors had enjoyed.

== Workers from overseas ==
Traditionally, Japan has had strict laws regarding the employment of foreigners, although exceptions were made for certain designated activities, provided that the workers have attended a Japanese university and have a high level of Japanese-language proficiency. Excepted categories have included executives and managers engaged in commercial activities, full-time scholars associated with research and education institutions, professional entertainers, engineers and others specializing in advanced technology, foreign-language teachers, and others with special skills unavailable among Japanese nationals. In 2019, restaurant, retail shop, and factory production line workers were added to the list. Officially, in 2008 there were 486,400 foreign workers in Japan: 43.3% of Chinese, 20.4% of Brazilians, 8.3% of Filipinos and others (A labor Ministry survey of Companies). More recent studies suggest that Japan has struggled to attract potential migrants despite immigration laws being relatively lenient (especially for high-skilled workers) compared to other developed countries. This is also apparent when looking at Japan's work visa program for "specified skilled worker", which had less than 400 applicants, despite an annual goal of attracting 40,000 overseas workers, suggesting Japan faces major challenges in attracting migrants compared to other developed countries. A Gallup poll found that few potential migrants wished to migrate to Japan compared to other G7 countries, consistent with the country's low migrant inflow.

Despite the now-reversed upward trend in the unemployment rate, many unpopular jobs go unfilled and the domestic labor market is sluggish. Imported labor is seen as a solution to this situation by some employers, who hire low-paid foreign workers, who are, in turn, enticed by comparatively high Japanese wages. The strict immigration laws are expected to remain on the books, however, although the influx of illegal aliens from nearby Asian countries (China, South-East Asian and Middle-Eastern countries) to participate in the labor market is likely to increase. Japanese companies have also established foreign subsidiaries to profit from low wages overseas. This trend started in Singapore in the 1970s. The outsourcing helped to build local infrastructure and started a technological transfer, and some of the former subsidiaries and joint ventures developed into fierce competitors.

=== China and Vietnam ===
China has become an exporter of labor to Japan to perform low wage "3K" jobs: Kitsui (demanding), Kitanai (dirty), and Kiken (dangerous). Chinese workers are hired by Chinese companies which contract with Japanese industry to provide labor. The Japanese government facilitates the import of labor under the Technical Intern Training Program administered by the Japan International Training Cooperation Organization (JITCO). Hours are long, pay sub-standard, and the freedom of the workers while in Japan is restricted. The Chinese or Vietnamese workers customarily pay a substantial sum to enter the programs and may have to make a substantial deposit as a guarantee that once in Japan they will work for the assigned employer, nevertheless, once in Japan, a number abandon the program and seek illegal employment in Japan, only the most exploitive being available. There is also a substantial number of workers from Vietnam.

=== Brazil ===
Japanese-Brazilians are descendants of Japanese who have immigrated to Brazil. They were discovered as a new labor source around 1990 and around one fifth of them now reside in Japan, which increased even after the collapse of the bubble economy in 1990. They are mainly located in two less appreciated sectors: 1) comparatively stable but low wage level in small to medium size factories troubled by constant labor shortage, and 2) highly unstable in medium to large size firms needing flexible staffing. The employers prefer Japanese-Brazilians to undocumented workers for racial or ethnocultural reasons. Earlier migrants were relatively fluent in Japanese, and caused less xenophobic reaction in factories. Undocumented workers tend to find jobs based on their personal networks whereas Brazilians do so through institutionalized channels, including recruiting agencies, and are paid more.

During 2009, the national unemployment reached 5.7%, which is considerably high in Japan, especially in the manufacture industry which congregates in Tōkai region, where estimated 83,000 of Japanese-Brazilians and Peruvians work in the industry. In April, the Japanese government budgeted 1.08 billion yen (valued 1.08 million US dollar in 2009) for Japanese-Brazilian immigrant workers for training, including Japanese language lesson, but also offered 300,000 yen (average wage of 18 to 39 years old in manufacture industry is 241,200 yen) to any unemployed workers who wished to leave the country and 200,000 yen each to their family members on the condition of not returning to Japan within 3 years with the same status.

=== United States ===
In the 1980s, the strong Japanese yen allowed Japanese companies to buy several American firms, adding a large American workforce to Japanese companies. The crisis of the 1990s, the Lost Decade, reversed the process, and western companies were buying major stakes in big Japanese companies, especially car makers. The process became like that of the 1980s by the early 2000s, when the country experienced a major recovery under the Prime Minister Koizumi administration. During that time, western stakes were greatly reduced or eliminated.

== See also ==
- Simultaneous recruiting of new graduates
- Freeters (part-time jobbers)
- NEET (not in employment, education or training)
- Elderly people in Japan
- Labor unions in Japan
- Lifetime employment
- Japanese work environment
- Japanese labour law
