= Worked to death =

Worked to death, death by overwork, and other similar terms can mean:

- Extermination through labour, intentional killing through forced labour
- Karoshi, unintentional death through overwork
