= Mr. Tonegawa =

Japanese manga series

- Mr. Tonegawa: Middle Management Blues
- First tankōbon volume cover, featuring Yukio Tonegawa

中間管理録トネガワ (Chūkan Kanriroku Tonegawa)
- Genre: Office comedy; Parody
- Created by: Nobuyuki Fukumoto
- Manga
- Written by: Tensei Hagiwara; Nobuyuki Fukumoto (collaboration)
- Illustrated by: Tomohiro Hashimoto; Tomoki Miyoshi
- Published by: Kodansha
- Imprint: YMKC Special
- Magazine: Monthly Young Magazine; (June 20, 2015 – January 23, 2018); Comic Days; (March 5, 2018 – June 8, 2020)
- Original run: June 20, 2015 – June 8, 2020
- Volumes: 10
- Anime television series
- Directed by: Keiichiro Kawaguchi
- Produced by: Toshio Nakatani; Atsushi Kirimoto; Toshiyuki Satō; Ryōsuke Tanaka; Ayuri Taguchi
- Written by: Mitsutaka Hirota
- Music by: Takahiro Yamada
- Studio: Madhouse
- Licensed by: NA: Sentai Filmworks
- Original network: Nippon TV (AnichU)
- Original run: July 4, 2018 – December 26, 2018
- Episodes: 24
- icon

Mr. Tonegawa: Middle Management Blues (Note: Japanese: 中間管理録トネガワ, Hepburn: Chūkan Kanriroku Tonegawa; lit. 'Middle Management Chronicle Tonegawa') is a Japanese manga series written by Tensei Hagiwara and illustrated by Tomohiro Hashimoto and Tomoki Miyoshi. It is a spin-off to the Kaiji manga series by Nobuyuki Fukumoto. It was serialized in Kodansha's Monthly Young Magazine from June 2015 to January 2018, and later moved to the Comic Days manga app in March 2018 and finished in June 2020. Its chapters were collected in ten tankōbon volumes. The series comically depicts the struggles and conflicts of Tonegawa, a middle manager who is an executive of the Teiai Group and leads a large number of blacksuits, but is most concerned about the mood of the tyrannical Chairman Hyōdō.

A 24-episode anime television series adaptation, produced by Madhouse, aired from July to December 2018 on Nippon TV's AnichU programming block. Sentai Filmworks licensed the anime series and an English dub began streaming on Hidive in August 2018. The show was also streamed on Crunchyroll.

By November 2018, the manga had over 2.9 million copies in circulation.

== Premise ==
The series follows Yukio Tonegawa, the right-hand man of the company's chairman, Kazutaka Hyōdō, and the top executive of the Teiai Group, one of Japan's largest consumer finance conglomerates. In order to distract Chairman Hyōdō from boredom, Tonegawa gathers eleven of his blacksuit subordinates and forms Team Tonegawa in order to plan a so-called "game of death" that will keep Hyōdō pleased. Troubled by the chairman's interference, the threat of loss of trust from Tonegawa's subordinates, illness, the members' blunders, and unplanned accidents, the team struggles in various ways to execute the project.

== Characters ==
=== Team Tonegawa ===
Yukio Tonegawa (利根川 幸雄, Tonegawa Yukio)
Voiced by: Toshiyuki Morikawa (Japanese); David Harbold (English)
A senior executive of the Teiai Group, he is a hard-working man with a keen understanding of psychology who commands high trust from his subordinates. He frequently provokes the displeasure of Kazutaka Hyōdō, whose feelings he struggles to read, and despite his year-round service, he is seldom rewarded. He retains scars from a sea snake bite sustained while working at the Teiai branch on Hateruma. His favorite foods are yakiniku and yakiniku bento. Years after leaving the company, he is last seen staring at a setting sun on a beach.

==== Initial members ====
Kenji Yamazaki (山崎 健二, Yamazaki Kenji)
Voiced by: Wataru Hatano (Japanese); Andrew Love (English)
A 30-year-old member of the initial black suit project team, he is a leader among the black suits who previously worked directly under the Chairman. Initially dissatisfied with Tonegawa's arrogant work ethic, he is ultimately moved by his superior's hard work and honest personality, becoming a loyal confidant. He is also tasked with taking care of Masayan. He eventually becomes one of the senior members of Teiai, instructing his black suit subordinates.
Jirō Saemonsaburō (佐衛門三郎 二朗, Saemonsaburō Jirō)
Voiced by: Nobunaga Shimazaki (Japanese); Alan Brincks (English)
One of the initial black suits. He is 23 years old and was the youngest member before Nishiguchi joined. A remarkably capable and flexible contributor, he devises ideas like Restricted Rock-Paper-Scissors and stands out for his creativity. His free-spirited and abandon-filled behavior is typical of contemporary youth. A skilled mahjong player, he wins the Tonegawa mahjong tournament. His unusual last name leads others to often call him "Saemon." He eventually resigns from Teiai to run an event management company and enters an uxorilocal marriage with Saeko, changing his last name to Nishiguchi.
Toshimasa Kawasaki (川崎 敏政, Kawasaki Toshimasa)
Voiced by: Kōtarō Nishiyama (Japanese); Ty Mahany (English)
One of the initial black suits. He is 30 years old and was the first team member to contract the flu. He eventually resigns from Teiai and secures a new position at a major bank.
Keiichi Ogino (荻野 圭一, Ogino Keiichi)
Voiced by: Akira Ishida (Japanese); John Gremillion (English)
One of the initial black suits. He is 35 years old. His birthplace is Zambia and he once aspired to be a comedian. While still working as a blacksuit, he reunites with his former comedy duo partner. They lose in the second round of the M-1 Grand Prix, but he remains busy creating new ideas.
Hidetoshi Nakata (中田 英寿, Nakata Hidetoshi)
Voiced by: Daiki Hamano (Japanese); Jack Ivy (English)
One of the initial black suits. He is 32 years old. He is the team's most enthusiastic bowler and enjoys planetariums. He frequently invites Nishiguchi to dinner, showing a particular interest in her. An airhead prone to careless remarks, he remains oblivious to the romantic affairs between Saemon and Nishiguchi. He tends to act silly and is true to his own desires. He eventually resigns from Teiai to become a professional manga artist, working on a series of four-panel strips but struggling with his editor, Komiya (小宮).
Heihachi Gonda (権田 平八, Gonda Heihachi)
Voiced by: Rikiya Koyama (Japanese); John Swasey (English)
One of the initial black suits. He is the oldest team member at 49 years old. After his career advancement was cut off, he spent his life avoiding responsibility until being directly ordered to substitute for an ill Tonegawa. Encouraged by Dōshita, he begins taking on more responsibility. He remains a blacksuit and wins an award for his photography hobby, confiding to Yamazaki that he has found a way to love himself without needing to get ahead professionally.
Kōji Dōshita (堂下 浩次, Dōshita Kōji)
Voiced by: Takuya Eguchi (Japanese); Jay Hickman (English)
One of the initial black suits. He is 32 years old and a former rugby team captain from T-Kyo University. An enthusiastic and hot-blooded sportsman, he encourages Gonda during his time as Tonegawa's substitute. His extreme sports-minded attitude leads him to strictly control Tonegawa's diet during a medical checkup, an approach Tonegawa describes as being "under surveillance." He has a petite younger brother named Takashi who works part-time for the team. He eventually returns to the PR department, establishes a rugby club, and wins a tournament.
Suguru Ebitani (海老谷 卓, Ebitani Suguru)
Voiced by: Taku Yashiro (Japanese); Mike Yager (English)
One of the initial black suits. He is 25 years old and a representative troublemaker who later becomes the first defector. Though extraordinarily energetic and enthusiastic, he cannot see the big picture, described by Tonegawa as "a cannon facing the wrong way." He eventually resigns from Teiai, and his personality changes significantly. He opens a small shrimp roll shop in Nerima and builds a successful business.

==== Added members ====
Ton (東さん, Ton-san)
Voiced by: Genki Okawa (Japanese); Joe Daniels (English)
An assistant black suit hastily recruited during Tonegawa's Human Mahjong project presentation, he is not an official member but consistently performs chores. He is later promoted to fill the vacancy left by Tsukui's elopement, with his former choreman duties assumed by Ebitani. His real name remains unknown.
Saeko Nishiguchi (西口 冴子, Nishiguchi Saeko)
Voiced by: Rena Maeda (Japanese); Elissa Cuellar (English)
A 22-year-old from Hakata, she is the lone female black suit in Tonegawa's team following the transfer of several members. She has a brother named Hiro (ひろ). In her private life, she posts selfies on social media and gives homemade cakes to colleagues, with Tonegawa occasionally seeking her female perspective. She later has a brief office romance with Saemon. She eventually marries him and has a daughter. Not wanting two "Sae" parts in the family register, she adopts him into her family, and he changes his surname to Nishiguchi.
Tsukui (津久井)
One of the added black suits, he is a temporary employee with somewhat narrow eyes. He is notably poor at fundamental business practices such as reporting, contacting, and discussing. His attempts to call the steelworks to deliver beams for the Steel Beam Crossing game fail completely. He substitutes a clothesline, resulting in all debtors surviving by forfeit. He is last seen going to a convenience store and does not reappear.
Junichi Miyazaki (宮崎 純一, Miyazaki Junichi)
One of the added black suits. He is from Nagasaki.
Masaya Ōsaki (大崎 正也, Ōsaki Masaya)
One of the added black suits. He is from Takasaki.
Junsaburō Higashimitateda (東御建田 順三郎, Higashimitateda Junsaburō)
One of the added black suits. Just like Saemon, he has an unusually complicated last name.
Shōta Yamada (山田 正太, Yamada Shōta)
One of the added black suits. He is the only one of the Yamadas to have suffered from appendicitis in the past.
Taichi Yamada (山田 太一, Yamada Taichi)
One of the added black suits. He has a small birthmark behind his ear.
Shōichi Yamada (山田 正一, Yamada Shōichi)
One of the added black suits.
Hosoyamada (細山田)
One of the added black suits.
Saburō Monjushirō (文殊四郎 三郎, Monjushirō Saburō)
One of the added black suits. Just like Saemon, he has an unusually complicated last name.
Kyōsuke Kumanomidō (熊埜御堂 京介, Kumanomidō Kyōsuke)
One of the added black suits. Just like Saemon, he has an unusually complicated last name. While the rest of the newly added members enjoy ordinary golf, he is the only one who enjoys minigolf.
Yūsaku Kanie (蟹江 優作, Kanie Yūsaku)
A new graduate, he is a somewhat nervous individual, particularly when answering phones. Ebitani nicknames him "Crab" (カニ, Kani), and he reciprocates by calling Ebitani "Mr. Shrimp" (エビさん, Ebi-san). He proposes the E-Card game during a presentation and receives guidance from Ebitani. The proposal is ultimately successful and the game is adopted.

==== Transferred members ====
Junichi Hagio (萩尾 純一, Hagio Junichi)
Voiced by: Kengo Kawanishi (Japanese); Orlanders Jones (English)
One of the initial black suits. He is 35 years old. He is later transferred to the Teiai branch office in south Hateruma with Kikuchi and Nagata. He has a younger twin brother, Kōichi (幸一), who was previously rejected during a Teiai job interview by Yamazaki for having the same name and face. Though he, Kikuchi, and Nagata briefly return to Teiai headquarters as new members of Team Tonegawa, they are subsequently transferred again, this time to the branch office in Sarobetsu Plain.
Ryō Kikuchi (菊地 亮, Kikuchi Ryō)
Voiced by: Takaya Aoyagi (Japanese); Rob Mungle (English)
One of the initial black suits. He is 35 years old.
Yūichirō Nagata (長田 雄一郎, Nagata Yūichirō)
Voiced by: Chiharu Sawashiro (Japanese); Mike Haimoto (English)
One of the initial black suits. He is 37 years old.
Ataru Yaotome (八乙女 中, Yaotome Ataru)
Voiced by: Takuma Terashima (Japanese); Gareth West (English)
One of the added black suits. He is a former salesman who joined Teiai as a mid-career hire. After literally bending over backwards for Hyōdō's attention, he becomes the Chairman's secretary.

==== Miscellaneous ====
Masayasu Honda (本田 正安, Honda Masayasu)
Voiced by: Akio Ōtsuka (Japanese); Marty Fleck (English)
A former restaurant employee, he is nicknamed Masayan (まさやん) and is a perfect physical double for Chairman Hyōdō. Recruited by Teiai to serve as a body double, he undergoes special training to replicate the Chairman's personality despite his own opposite nature. Spoiled by Team Tonegawa in Yamazaki's absence, he begins breaking personal belongings and ranking everyone except Yamazaki beneath himself until corrected by Kurosaki. He subsequently fears Kurosaki, with the phrase "Kuro's coming!" ensuring his compliance. He has a younger twin brother named Hiroyasu (広安). He eventually reverts to his original personality and returns home.
Hajime Miyamoto (宮本 一, Miyamoto Hajime)
Voiced by: Toshiki Masuda (Japanese); John Ramirez (English)
A monitoring blacksuit from the Teiai underground forced labor facility, he also appears in the spin-off 1-nichi Gaishutsuroku Hanchō. He first appears asking the T-AI Boy robot to read his palm.
Ueno (上野)
Voiced by: Taiten Kusunoki (Japanese); Patrick Poole (English)
One of Tonegawa's classmates from high school days.
Shinanogawa (信濃川)
Voiced by: Tesshō Genda (Japanese); Kyle C. Jones (English)
One of Tonegawa's classmates from high school days. He and Tonegawa are known as the "Great Rivers Duo" because their surnames derive from real-life Japanese rivers (Tone River and Shinano River).
Nakabeppu (中別府)
Voiced by: Hozumi Gōda (Japanese); Mark Mendelsohn (English)
One of Tonegawa's classmates from high school days.
Maho Kagawa (香川 真穂, Kagawa Maho)
Voiced by: Eri Saitō (Japanese); Patricia Duran (English)
One of Tonegawa's classmates from high school days. Tonegawa was her first love.
Okamura (岡村)
Voiced by: Yūko Ueda (Japanese); Samantha Stevens (English)
One of Tonegawa's classmates from high school days.

=== Teiai Group Executives ===
Kazutaka Hyōdō (兵藤 和尊, Hyōdō Kazutaka)
Voiced by: Masane Tsukayama (Japanese); Marty Fleck (English)
An old man who is the leader of the Teiai Group, he is called "Chairman" by his subordinates. Greater emphasis is placed on his elderly qualities, such as going to bed precisely at 10 p.m. and meticulously maintaining his skincare routine during fall and winter.
Yoshihiro Kurosaki (黒崎 義裕, Kurosaki Yoshihiro)
Voiced by: Atsushi Miyauchi (Japanese); Jovan Jackson (English)
One of the top executives in the Teiai Group, he is a rival to Tonegawa, vying for the position of second-in-command. In contrast to Tonegawa, he possesses a knack for pleasing Hyōdō and often makes sharp, pointed remarks. He is known for stating difficult truths without hesitation, which consistently yields positive responses. Generally gentle and aloof, he occasionally causes Hyōdō to falter, yet demonstrates ruthlessness when necessary, such as violently slapping the unruly Masayan into submission. His dark expression in that moment leaves Masayan traumatized.

=== Related Teiai Group Persons ===
Yūji Endō (遠藤 勇次, Endō Yūji)
Voiced by: Kenjiro Tsuda (Japanese); David Matranga (English)
A yakuza and president of the Teiai-affiliated Endō Finance, he works under Tonegawa and often appears in a supporting role. While generally sympathetic towards Tonegawa, his outrageous actions—such as excessively brainwashing recent black suit graduates and abandoning Masayan in the woods without authorization—cause Tonegawa to become wary. His tendency to appear at inopportune moments and consistently produce negative outcomes makes him a disruptive figure.
Seiya Ichijō (一条 聖也, Ichijō Seiya)
Voiced by: Daisuke Namikawa (Japanese); Scott Gibbs (English)
A young manager of a Teiai-affiliated underground casino, he oversees the man-eating pachinko machine known as "The Bog." When Tonegawa visits to recover the 1.5 billion yen lost to the machine, he is responsible for entertaining him. The reception is very poor, and Tonegawa is appalled by the blatantly rigged settings of the Bog.
Murakami (村上)
Voiced by: Takaaki Torashima (Japanese); Michael Wronski (English)
Ichijou's underling and senior staff of the underground casino that Ichijō manages. At Ichijō's command, he blatantly rigged the settings of the Bog.
Kinezaki (木根崎)
Voiced by: Rei Yamahata (Japanese); Michael Wronski (English)
A representative of the Kansai branch of the Teiai Group. He is always high-handed and self-centered, ranting and yelling at his subordinates ("a yakuza-like man," according to Tonegawa).
Watanabe (渡辺くん, Watanabe-kun)
Voiced by: Masato Hagiwara (Japanese); Blake Shepard (English)
One of the debtors, he had a problematic personality as a working adult. Despite his age, he is selfish and enjoys horse racing. His round facial features contrast with Kaiji's pointed ones. Endō summons him to a lecture on multiple debtors, where his childish actions are revealed, including spending company money on pachinko and using funds collected by his mother from relatives to bet on horses instead of repaying debts.
Satoshi Aida (相田 さとし, Aida Satoshi)
One of the debtors, he is an aspiring comedian who performs a routine for President Hyōdō and Tonegawa in an attempt to promote himself. Chairman Hyōdō dismisses him as a genuine idiot unworthy of ridicule, while Tonegawa feigns a yawn to hide any amusement. Sent underground, he eventually manages to amuse Isawa with his jokes there.
Kaiji Itō (伊藤 開司, Itō Kaiji)
Voiced by: Masato Hagiwara
The protagonist of the main series, he appears in several recap scenes and at the end of episode 13 in the anime adaptation. He does not appear in the manga and is only referenced by name in a single line of narration.

=== Underground Labor Facility ===
Tarō Ōtsuki (大槻 太郎, Ōtsuki Tarō)
Voiced by: Chō (Japanese); Greg Cote (English)
The foreman of Squad E in the underground facility and protagonist of the spin-off 1-nichi Gaishutsuroku Hanchō. He witnesses Aida's comedy routine but remains unamused. He also encounters Tonegawa in the "Tonegawa vs. Foreman" one-shot.
Takuya Numakawa (沼川 拓也, Numakawa Takuya)
Voiced by: Takuya Satō (Japanese); Kregg Dailey (English)
Ootsuki's close aide, he witnesses Aida's comedy routine but remains unamused.
Kaoru Isawa (石和 薫, Isawa Kaoru)
Voiced by: Yoshitsugu Matsuoka (Japanese); Kyle C. Jones (English)
Ootsuki's close aide, he witnesses Aida's comedy routine and is the only one of the three who laughs.

== Media ==
=== Manga ===
Written by Tensei Hagiwara and illustrated by Tomohiro Hashimoto and Tomoki Miyoshi, with cooperation from Nobuyuki Fukumoto, Mr. Tonegawa was serialized in Kodansha's Monthly Young Magazine from June 20, 2015, to January 23, 2018. The manga was transferred to the Comic Days manga app, where it was published from March 5, 2018, to June 8, 2020. Kodansha collected its chapters in ten individual tankōbon volumes, published from December 4, 2015, to August 11, 2020.

==== Volumes ====
No.	Release date	ISBN
1	December 4, 2015	978-4-06-382721-7
1. "Introductions" (紹介, Shōkai); 2. "Lubrication" (注油, Chūyu); 3. "Choices" (択一, Takuitsu); 4. "Leisure" (余興, Yokyō); 5. "Chopping" (乱切, Ransetsu); 6. "Alternate Plan" (代案, Daian); 7. "Riichi" (立直); Fukumoto Nobuyuki Special Bonus Story: "Emblem" (紋章, Monshō)
2	April 6, 2016	978-4-06-382774-3
8. "Aesthetic Sense" (鑑賞, Kanshō); 9. "Angle" (角度, Kakudo); 10. "Renewal" (書換, Kakikae); 11. "Announcement" (発表, Happyō); 12. "Cannon" (大砲, Taihō); 12.5. "Vengeful Spirit" (生霊, Seirei); 13. "Washing Hands" (手洗, Tearai); 14. "Proxy" (代理, Dairi); Extra Episode: "Business Trip" (出張, Shucchō); Special One-Shot: "Foreman: 1-Day Excursion" (1日外出録ハンチョウ, 1-nichi Gaishutsuroku Hanchō)
3	August 5, 2016	978-4-06-382833-7; 978-4-06-362337-6 (LE)
15. "Recruitment" (採用, Saiyō); 16. "Lunch Time" (昼時, Hirudoki); 17. "Beckoning" (手招, Temaneki); 18. "Chase" (追走, Tsuisō); 19. "Measurement" (計測, Keisoku); 20. "Get-Together" (飲会, Nomikai); 21. "Training" (講習, Kōshō); 22. "Life" (人生, Jinsei); 23. "Entertainment" (接待, Settai)
4	December 6, 2016	978-4-06-382884-9
24. "Sharp Boots" (尖靴, Senka); 25. "Questions and Answers" (問答, Mondō); 26. "Just Salt" (唯塩, Tadashio); 27. "Seizing" (手掴, Tezugami); 28. "Meat Diet" (肉食, Nikushoku); 29. "White Suits" (白服, Shirofuku); 30. "Speech" (弁舌, Benzetsu); 31. "Shrimp" (海老, Ebi); Fukumoto Nobuyuki Special One-Shot: "Throne" (王座, Ōza)
5	June 6, 2016	978-4-06-382972-3
32. "Unofficial Announcement" (内示, Naiji); 33. "Send-Off" (送別, Sōbetsu); 34. "Horse's Name" (馬名, Bamei); 35. "Saeko" (冴子); 36. "Intervention" (介入, Kainyū); 37. "Drum" (太鼓, Taiko); 38. "Tweeting" (呟言, Tsubuyakigoto); Extra Episode: "Dessert" (甘味, Amami); Special One-Shot: "Tonegawa VS. Foreman" (トネガワVS．ハンチョウ, Tonegawa VS. Hanchō)
6	November 6, 2017	978-4-06-510526-9
39. "Editorial" (編集, Henshū); 40. "Old Friends" (旧友, Kyūyū); 41. "Stardust" (星屑, Hoshikuzu); 42. "Users' Manual" (取説, Torisetsu); 43. "Prizing" (愛玩, Aigan); 44. "Going Wild" (暴走, Bōsō); 45. "Red Hot" (灼熱, Shakunetsu); Extra Episode: "Change" (改変, Kaihen)
7	July 11, 2018	978-4-06-512033-0
46. "Crossing Paths" (掛違, Kakechigai); 47. "Tapering" (先細, Sakiboso); 48. "Window-Side" (窓際, Madogiwa); 49. "Sponsoring" (提供, Teikyō); 50. "Dragons' Den" (金虎, Kanetora); 51. "Spring Breeze" (春風, Shunpū); 52. "Rest" (安息, Ansoku); Extra Episode: "Three Minutes" (三分, Sanpun); Extra Episode: "Siblings" (兄弟, Kyōdai)
8	February 13, 2019	978-4-06-514559-3
53. "Limited Express" (特急, Tokkyō); 54. "Death Struggle" (死闘, Shitō); 55. "Gambling Genius" (博才, Bakusai); 56. "Flying Swallow" (燕飛, Enpi); 57. "The Front" (手前, Temae); 58. "Computer" (電脳, Dennō); 59. "Overpayment" (過払, Kabarai); 60. "Black Feast" (黒宴, Kuroutage)
9	November 13, 2019	978-4-06-517724-2
61. "Jet-Black" (漆黒, Shikkoku); 62. "Smoker" (吹者, Suisha); 63. "Halt" (立止, Tachidomari); 64. "One's Own Book" (自著, Jicho); 65. "Conjecture" (忖度, Sontaku); 66. "Strong Friendship" (断金, Dankin); 67. "Discussion" (対話, Taiwa); 68. "Surprise Attack" (奇襲, Kishū); Special Episode: "Gonda" (権田)
10	August 11, 2020	978-4-06-520454-2
69. "Memories" (思出, Omoide); 70. "Secret Account" (裏垢, Ura'aka); 71. "The Two Kings" (王王, Ōō); 72. "Past Forty" (不惑, Fuwaku); 71.5. "Masayasu" (正安); 73. "Change of Occupation" (転職, Tenshoku); 74. "Palm Reading" (手相, Tesō); 75. "Bamboo Rake" (熊手, Kumade); 76. "Halfway In" (途中, Tochū)

=== Anime ===
An anime television series adaptation was announced in February 2018. Produced by Nippon TV, VAP, Nippon Television Music Corporation and Madhouse, it is directed by Keiichiro Kawaguchi, with Mitsutaka Hirota handling series composition, Haruhito Takada designing the characters and Takahiro Yamada composing the music. It ran for 24 episodes on Nippon TV's AnichU programming block from July 4 to December 26, 2018. Jay Kabira served as the series' narrator, and each episode includes different voice actresses and actors for the trademark sound effect "Zawa Zawa", among which are: Masako Nozawa, Miyuki Sawashiro, Yū Serizawa, Ari Ozawa, Kana Hanazawa, Tomoyo Kurosawa, Shiori Izawa, Megumi Han, Chō and Chiharu Sawashiro. The series also includes segments covering a portion of chapters from 1-nichi Gaishutsuroku Hanchō, a spin-off manga about the foreman Ōtsuki. The opening theme is "Sassō to Hashiru Tonegawa-kun" (颯爽と走るトネガワ君; lit. 'Gallantly Running Tonegawa') by Gesu no Kiwami Otome, the first ending theme is "Oki Tegami" (隠岐手紙; lit. 'Farewell Letter') by Pistol Takehara, and the second ending is "Kyōgenmawashi" (狂言回し; lit. 'Major Supporting Role') by NoisyCell. VAP published the series on two DVD and Blu-ray box sets between December 12, 2018, and March 27, 2019, with the second set including a drama CD that adapted chapters from 1-nichi Gaishutsuroku Hanchō not shown in the anime. A 32-track original soundtrack was released on August 22, 2018.

Sentai Filmworks have licensed the anime and an English dub began streaming on Hidive on August 3, 2018. Sentai Filmworks released the series on Blu-ray on October 15, 2019. The show is also available for viewing on Crunchyroll.

== Reception ==
The series topped the 2017 list of Takarajimasha's Kono Manga ga Sugoi! guidebook top 20 manga for male readers. In 2018, the manga was among the top 20 best-selling Amazon Kindle books in Japan, ranked at #16, based on sales data between November 13, 2017, and October 31, 2018. By November 2018, the manga had over 2.9 million copies in circulation.

Anime News Network had four editors review the first episode of the series. Paul Jensen wrote that the series would primarily appeal to Kaiji fans, though it might attract other viewers if it allowed its humor more room to develop. Theron Martin noted that the brief recap at the beginning of the first episode made the series accessible to new viewers. Martin responded positively to the comedy, stating that the series could establish its own niche and a loyal following. James Beckett described the series as aimed exclusively at middle-aged Japanese viewers who relate to the experiences of a middle manager in a large corporation, criminal or otherwise. Rebecca Silverman found the character designs unappealing and the predominantly black-and-gray color palette unhelpful. She concluded that the first episode did not provide enough incentive to continue watching, as observing the game itself was more interesting than watching its construction.

Paul Chapman of Crunchyroll recommended the series, stating that it would likely appeal to any anime fan familiar with the demands of a corporate job. Chris Beveridge of The Fandom Post, reviewing the Blu-ray release, gave the series a grade of "B+". Beveridge wrote that Tonegawa was an engaging character and that having him as a protagonist was a welcome departure from the norm. He concluded that the series was an acquired taste, but that those who appreciated it would desire more. Amy McNulty of Anime News Network ranked the series fourth on her list of "The Best Anime of 2018". In a separate article, McNulty listed Mr. Tonegawa: Middle Management Blues among the "Best Anime of Fall 2018".
