= Salaryman =

Japanese white-collar worker

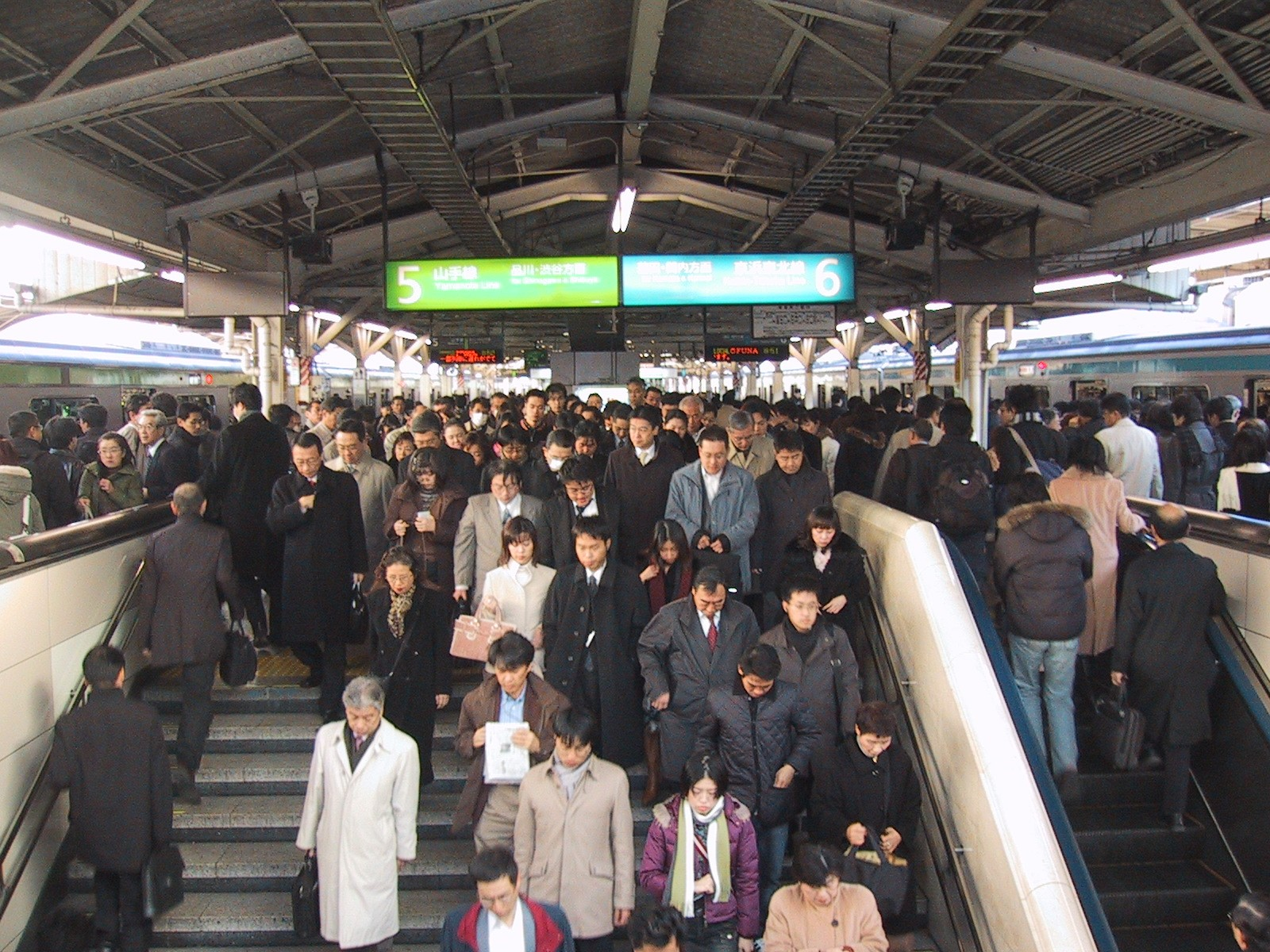
Salarymen commuting in Tokyo Station, 2005

A salaryman (サラリーマン, sararīman; Japanese pronunciation: [sä̀.ɾä́.ɾíì.mä̀ɴ]) is an informal Japanese term for a salaried employee, particularly an employee of a company. Although historically associated especially with male office employees, the term does not denote a clearly defined occupational or social class.

The term emerged in the early twentieth century and became widely used during the Taishō and early Shōwa periods. Following Japan's post-war economic growth, the salaryman became a prominent social image and a symbol of the typical Japanese worker. In post-war representations, the figure became closely associated with a family model consisting of a salaried husband, a full-time housewife and their children.

From the late 1980s and 1990s, this once widely assumed model increasingly came into question as Japanese employment and family patterns changed. The growth of non-regular employment since the mid-1990s has further weakened the association between the salaryman and the typical Japanese worker.

== Description ==
The post-war image of the salaryman was particularly associated with male white-collar employees of large companies. This image was closely connected with the long-term employment practices of large Japanese firms, in which regular employees were commonly recruited early in their careers and expected to remain with the same employer for much of their working lives. The salaryman also developed into a broader cultural image associated with strong identification with the company and with the male breadwinner role in the post-war family.

== Social image ==
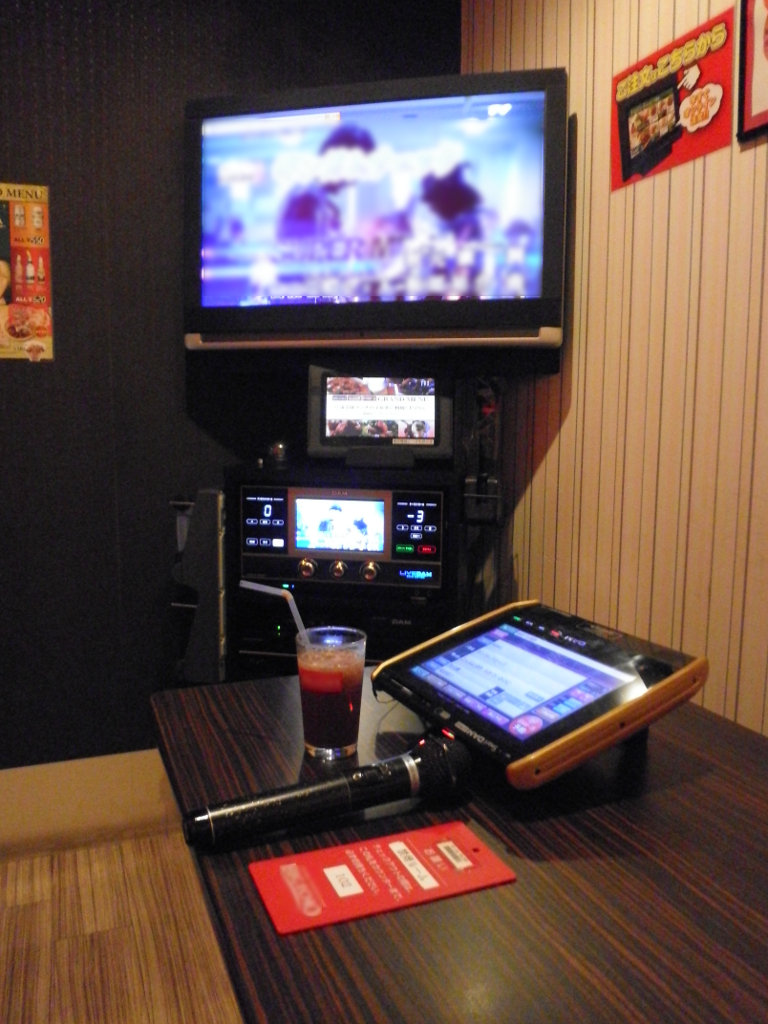
Karaoke booth

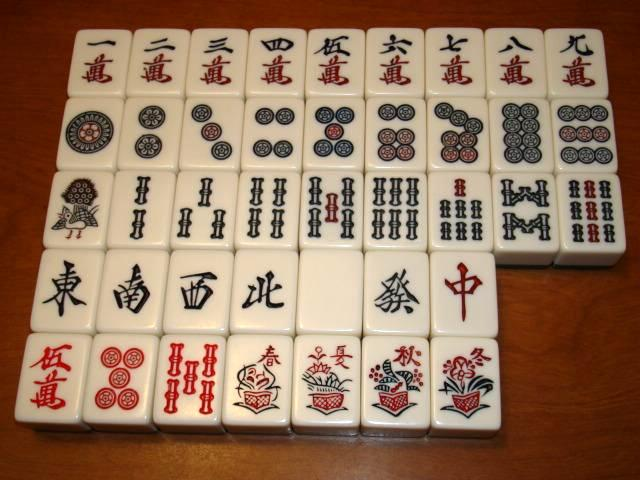
Mahjong tiles

The prevalence of salarymen in Japanese society has given birth to many depictions by both the Japanese and American media. Some films in Japan about salarymen include Mr. Salaryman, Japanese Salaryman NEO (based on the TV series), and a drama series entitled History of a Salaryman. There is a certain expectation among the middle and upper classes for Japanese people to become salarymen. For many young Japanese men and women, accepting anything less than becoming a salaryman and conforming to its ideal is considered a failure, not only of themselves, but also of their parents.

=== Entertainment ===
Changing social circumstances have greatly diversified the life of the salaryman outside of work. Though the importance of social drinking has not declined, its image has changed over time from mass partying during the economic bubble to conservative consumption at home after the collapse of the economy during the 1990s. Mahjong was an immensely popular game among the 1960s generation of salarymen, who brought the game into company circles directly from high school and college groups. The 1970s generation saw a gradual decrease in the number of avid mahjong players, and by the 1980s, it became common not to show any interest at it at all.

Golf became widely popular during the economic bubble, when golf club passes became useful tools for currying favor with corporate executives. Many mid-level salarymen were pressured into taking up golf to participate in golfing events with their superiors. The collapse of the economic bubble led to the closing of many golf courses, and playing golf with executives has become increasingly rare. However, some current salarymen may have golfing experience from their student days, and golf is still acknowledged as an expensive hobby for salarymen.

== Karōshi ==
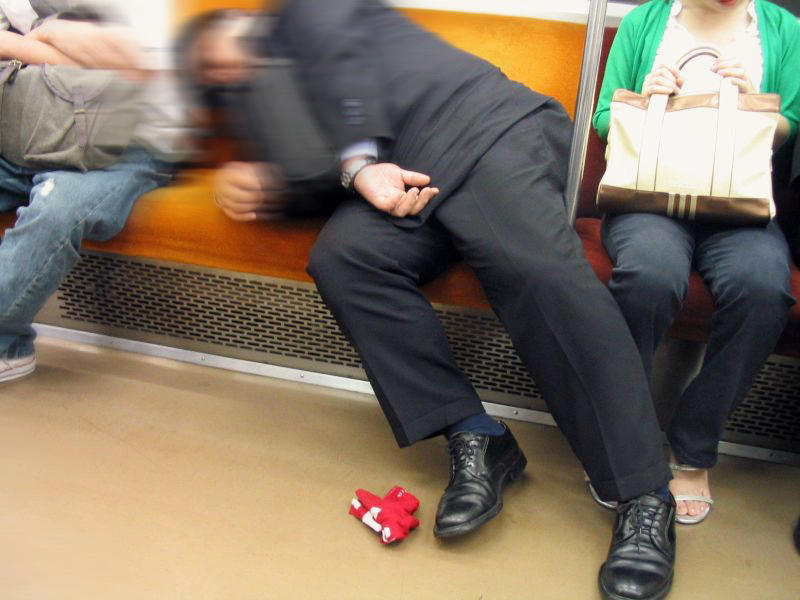
A salaryman asleep on the Tokyo subway.

Extreme pressure on salarymen can lead to karōshi - literally "overwork death". Salarymen feel intense pressure to fulfill their duty to support their family because of the gendered expectations placed on men. According to a Washington Post article, the Japanese government struggled for years to pass a law limiting to the number of hours one can work, and the issue has been prevalent since the 1970s. In 2014, after 30 years of activism, Japan's parliament passed a law "promoting countermeasures against karōshi."

Karōshi was first diagnosed as a "circulatory disease brought on by stress" in the late 1970s after the 1973 oil crisis, which took a toll on the post-war reconstruction of Japanese industry. Since then, the number of deaths from overwork has increased, especially at larger and more prestigious companies. In 2002, Kenichi Uchino, a 30-year-old quality-control manager at Toyota, collapsed and died after working over 80 hours unpaid overtime for six months.

However, many Japanese still criticize the government and believe there should be some form of punishment for companies that violate work hour laws. In 2007, of 2207 work-related suicides, 672 were attributed to overwork. McDonald's and Toyota, both of whom were taken to court regarding long hours of unpaid overtime have since changed policies to pay overtime, reduce expected overtime and in Toyota's case "try to improve its monitoring of workers' health".

== See also ==
- Hansei
- Japanese blue collar workers
- Japanese management culture
- Japanese work environment
- Salaryman Kintarō
- Simultaneous recruiting of new graduates
- Suicide in Japan
- Akio Koiso

Women

- Kyariaūman, Japanese term for a career woman
- Office lady

General

- The Organization Man
- White-collar worker
- Work–life balance
- Wage slave
