= Miki Watanabe =

Japanese businessman and politician

- 渡邉 美樹
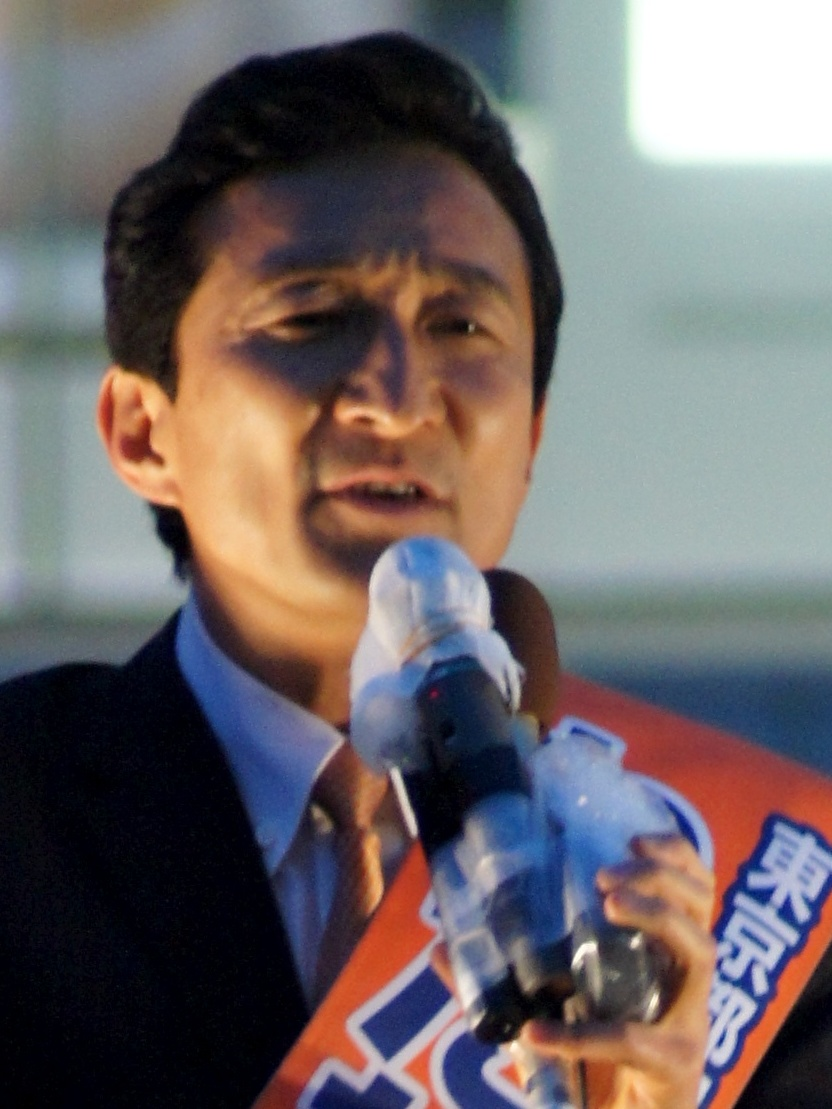
- Watanabe in 2011

Member of the House of Councillors
- In office 29 July 2013 – 28 July 2019
- Constituency: National PR

Personal details
- Born: 5 October 1959 (age 66) Yokohama, Kanagawa, Japan
- Party: Liberal Democratic
- Education: Meiji University
- Website: www.watanabemiki.net

Miki Watanabe GCM (渡邉 美樹, Watanabe Miki; born October 5, 1959) is a Japanese entrepreneur and politician. He founded the Watami chain of izakaya restaurants and headed the company until 2011, when he resigned to run in the 2011 Tokyo gubernatorial election. Watanabe's run for the governorship of Tokyo was inspired by Michael Bloomberg's mayorship of New York City. Watanabe came in third with 16.8%, losing to incumbent governor Shintaro Ishihara.

== Career ==
Watanabe got opportunities to appear as a commentator on NHK General TV, NHK Educational TV, Nippon TV and Tokyo Broadcasting TV, raised his name recognition, and was elected to the House of Councillors representing the Liberal Democratic Party in the 2013 election. As of January 2014, he was the wealthiest member of the House of Councillors with reported personal assets of ¥1.76 billion. He is a member of the Committee on Economy and Industry, Committee on Oversight of Administration, Special Committee on Reconstruction after the Great East Japan earthquake, and Research Committee on Deflation-Ending Measures and Strengthening Public Finance for Nationals' Life.

== Philanthropy ==
Watanabe founded the School Aid Japan charity in 2001 to build schools and orphanages in Cambodia and Nepal. In Japan, Watanabe purchased an educational corporation which had been in financial difficulties due to the advice of Hirofumi Shimomura, a member of the House of Representatives and one of Shinzo Abe's aides.

Watanabe is a billboard of Seminar companies of LGAT with Ikujiro Nonaka, Jitsuro Terashima and others. Watanabe is giving opportunities of the high school lecture he owns to the presidents of LGAT.

== Controversy ==
The Watami group has faced criticism as a "black company" for its harsh treatment of employees, and was voted the worst company in Japan to work for in 2012 and 2013. The 2008 suicide of Mina Mori, a Watami employee who had worked 140 hours of overtime was ruled a case of karōshi (death from overwork) by the Kanagawa Prefecture Labor Standards Office, who also accused the company of numerous labor law violations. In December 2015 Watami reached an out-of-court settlement of ¥130 million (equivalent to ¥144.25 million in 2024) with the family and Watanabe apologised. In addition, at the nursing home operated by Watanabe, due to carelessness of employees caused by their harsh labor, multiple death accidents occurred.

In 2012, Japanese-language magazine Aera reported that Watanabe made a female staffer of its educational corporation his mistress, like "a sexual tool", and abandoned her like garbage with only a notification of mobile e-mail. The educational corporate officer who sympathized with her was fired.

== Bibliography ==
- —; Fujimaki, Yukio; Tsujiguchi, Hirohiro; Katsuma, Kazuyo (25 May 2020). 仕事学のすすめ 2010年6･7月 夢を実現するマネジメント [Recommendations for work studies June/July 2010 Management that makes dreams come true] (in Japanese). NHK Publishing. ISBN 978-4141895473. OCLC 852400644.
