= Black company (Japan) =

Business with an exploitative work culture

A black company (ブラック企業/ブラック会社, burakku kigyō/burakku gaisha), also referred to in English as a black corporation or black business, is a Japanese term for a company that is exploitative or abusive towards its workers.

== Etymology ==
The term "black company" was coined in the early 2000s by young IT workers but has since come to be applied to various industries.

== Conditions ==
While specifics may vary from workplace to workplace and company to company, a typical practice at a black company is to hire a large number of young employees and then force them to work large amounts of overtime without overtime pay. Conditions are poor, and workers are subjected to verbal abuse and "power harassment" (bullying) by their superiors. In order to make the employees stay, superiors of black companies would often threaten young employees with disrepute if they chose to quit.

== Noteworthy cases ==
Mina Mori, a 26-year-old employee of the restaurant chain Watami, committed suicide two months after joining the company in 2008. Her family lodged a complaint with the Yokosuka Labor Standards Office to seek recognition of the suicide as work-related. When their claim was denied, they appealed it to the Kanagawa Prefectural Labor Bureau, which recognized work-related stress as the cause of the decline of her mental health. In December 2015, Watami reached an out-of-court settlement of ¥130 million (equivalent to ¥144.25 million in 2024) with the family, and Watami founder Miki Watanabe apologized.

== See also ==
- 996 working hour system
- Crunch (video games)
- Evil corporation
- Japanese work environment
- Karoshi
- McJob
- Occupational stress
- Workplace bullying
