= Japanese management culture =

Japanese management culture refers to working philosophies or methods in Japan. It included concepts and philosophies such as just in time, kaizen and total quality management.

== Managerial style ==
The Japanese term Hō-Ren-Sō (報・連・相) refers to frequent reporting, touching base and discussing – important attributes that are said to characterize collaboration and information flow within effective Japanese corporate culture. It is an "abbreviation of "Hōkoku" (報告, to report), "Renraku" (連絡, to inform) and "Sōdan" (相談, to consult), and is more memorable as a homonym of hōrensō, the Japanese word for "spinach". The term refers to "getting your hands dirty", to identify or solve immediate problems and leaders are not exempt from this. Aspects of these principles are often mistaken by western managers as "micromanagement". In contrast, these principles are used as tools to shepherd processes.

Mohammed Ala and William Cordeiro (1999) described the Japanese decision-making process of ringiseido (稟議制度). Ringiseido provides the opportunity for equal ranking managers or employees of a group within a company to partake in an individual's idea. The process adheres to the Japanese cultural desire of harmony among people. The physical action of ringiseido is referred to as the "ringi decision-making process." It fosters an environment of support and agreement for a decision once a higher ranking manager has reviewed and accepted the recommended decision.

The term of ringi (稟議) has two meanings. The first meaning being of "rin", 'submitting a proposal to one's supervisors and receiving their approval,' and "gi" meaning 'deliberations and decisions.' Corporate policy is not clearly defined by the executive leadership of a Japanese company. Rather, the managers at all levels below executives must raise decisions to the next level except for routine decisions.

The process of "ringi decision-making" is conducted through a document called a ringisho (稟議書) The ringisho is created and circulated by the individual who created the idea. As the ringisho reaches a peer for review, the peer places their "personal seal (hanko) right side up" to agree, "upside down" to disagree, and sideways to indicate being undecided. Once all peers have reviewed the ringisho the peers' manager reviews the ringisho and places their hanko on it. The upper level manager's decision is final and the ringisho is sent back to the originator who either initiates the idea or re-evaluates, based on the "hanko" of the upper level manager.

== Vision ==
Richard Pascale and Anthony Athos suggested in The Art of Japanese Management (1981) that western business practices lacked "vision", which they identified as one of the "key components of Japanese management". Yang refers to "long-term vision setting" as a different process from "long-range planning".

== Leadership values ==
Tony Kippenberger (2002) elaborates on the leadership values that are deeply rooted in the Japanese business culture. These values were created by the late Konosuke Matsushita, the prominent entrepreneur of Matsushita's Electric Company, who cared deeply for the employees of his company as if they were family. Matsushita firmly believed that a business as large as his was responsible to help all of society prosper, and not simply for those that owned and ran the company to prosper.

In 1933 Matsushita, during the great depression, created seven "guiding principles":

- Service to the public – by providing high-quality goods and services at reasonable prices, we contribute to the public's well-being;
- Fairness and honesty – we will be fair and honest in all our business dealings and personal conduct;
- Teamwork for the common cause – we will pool abilities, based on mutual trust and respect;
- Uniting effort for improvement – we will constantly strive to improve our corporate and personal performances;
- Courtesy and humility – we will always be cordial and modest and respect the rights and needs of others;
- Accordance with natural laws – we will abide by the laws of nature and adjust to the ever-changing conditions around us; and
- Gratitude for blessings – we will always be grateful for all the blessings and kindness we have received."

The "guiding principles" were "remarkable for their time". The seven principles are used by Matsushita's company today and serve as principles for other Japanese companies. Because the "guiding principles" are such powerful statements and an extension of the Japanese culture into business, the principles have been renamed the "Seven Spirits of Matsushita" to honor Matsushita.

== Smaller companies ==
In smaller companies, an entirely different corporate culture developed. Similar to the Meister system of Germany, new recruits are placed under skilled senior specialists and spend years learning every technique that they have. They are trained to develop deeper understanding of specific areas of skills instead of the broader and less deep training that those in a larger corporation receive. They learn to produce work of high quality using few simple tools and few or no advanced industrial tools.

== Japanese women in management ==
As the modern cultures of the world continue to evolve, cultural concepts either lose presence or evolve with the modern concepts. Japan is experiencing such an evolution in regard to women in the workplace and in management roles. While a main reason for this evolution is the adoption of western influence on Japanese society, Japan is being forced to support this evolution because it is grappling with a declining population and lower birth rate which will lead to a smaller workforce.

According to "Cloud, or Silver Linings?" published in the Economist (2007), it was reported that in 2006 Japan's birth rate was 1.32 and has been below 2.1 since the 1970s. A birthrate of 2.1 is necessary to successfully maintain current population numbers. The article described that the OECD has proven there is a "positive correlation between fertility and female employment." Thus, if an effort is made to support females work ambitions and family desires, then women will be more willing and likely to want to have children and families and not have to sacrifice their career in the process. Japanese officials are not taking this information lightly. During his last year in office, Prime Minister Junichiro Koizumi (2002–2007) began legislation to foster "financial support for families with young children and an expansion of child-care facilities (p. 27).

== See also ==
- Category:Japanese business terms
- Japanese work environment
- Salaryman
- Akio Koiso
