= 1-nichi Gaishutsuroku Hanchō =

Japanese manga series

- First tankōbon volume cover, featuring Tarō Ōtsuki

1日外出録ハンチョウ
- Genre: Comedy; Cooking
- Created by: Nobuyuki Fukumoto
- Manga
- Written by: Tensei Hagiwara; Nobuyuki Fukumoto (collaboration)
- Illustrated by: Motomu Uehara; Kazuya Arai
- Published by: Kodansha
- Imprint: YMKC Special
- Magazine: Weekly Young Magazine
- Original run: December 26, 2016 – present
- Volumes: 23
- icon

1-nichi Gaishutsuroku Hanchō (1日外出録ハンチョウ; lit. 'One-Day Outing Foreman') is a Japanese manga series written by Tensei Hagiwara and illustrated by Motomu Uehara and Kazuya Arai. It is a spin-off to the Kaiji manga series by Nobuyuki Fukumoto. It has been published in Kodansha's seinen manga magazine Weekly Young Magazine since December 2016. Part of the manga was adapted as segmented episodes within the Mr. Tonegawa anime series. A drama CD based on the series was included on the second DVD/Blu-ray Disc set of the Mr. Tonegawa anime series in March 2019.

== Story ==
The story follows Ōtsuki, the foreman of Squad E in the underground forced labor camp for people in debt, as he uses one-day outside passes to leave the camp for a day. Usually, each trip involves food or drink in some way.

== Characters ==
=== Main characters ===
Tarō Ōtsuki (大槻 太郎, Ōtsuki Tarō)
Voiced by: Chō (Japanese); Greg Cote (English)
The foreman of Squad E oversees an underground labor facility, speaking in a blend of Kansai, Chūgoku and Shikoku dialects. He exploits his position by selling goods and rigging cee-lo games to accumulate perica, the underground currency. Though he regularly buys "One-Day Outside Passes" and possesses the skills to survive aboveground, he chooses to remain below. A discerning gourmet, he spends his surface visits carefully selecting restaurants, occasionally visiting baths or bars. He claims to have been a Tokyo university student 25 years earlier, playing in a student band and frequenting a Kinshicho Chinese restaurant. Remarkably, his appearance has changed little since high school except for his hair, despite subsequent corporate employment.
Takuya Numakawa (沼川 拓也, Numakawa Takuya)
Voiced by: Takuya Satō (Japanese); Kregg Dailey (English)
Ōtsuki's trusted assistant. A 35-year-old Miyazaki Prefecture native, he functions as the group's straight man, often exasperated by Ōtsuki and Isawa's antics. Initially uncomfortable with surface outings, he gradually learns to enjoy them by emulating Ōtsuki's confident approach. His admiration for Ōtsuki occasionally turns to frustration, leading to temporary conflicts that typically resolve through Miyamoto's mediation. During a stay in a private suite resembling a Japanese hotel, he initially struggles to occupy himself before finding unexpected joy in karaoke, enthusiastically performing songs including "Sakuranbo". His musical enjoyment becomes a source of amusement for Ōtsuki and Isawa, who overhear his performance.
Kaoru Isawa (石和 薫, Isawa Kaoru)
Voiced by: Yoshitsugu Matsuoka (Japanese); Kyle C. Jones (English)
Ōtsuki's primary assistant. A 34-year-old "trickster" and "comic relief" character, he frequently bewilders Ōtsuki and Numakawa with his exuberant optimism and self-centered behavior. His shared enthusiasm for the Bakumatsu period with Ōtsuki forms the foundation of their working relationship. Emotionally demonstrative, he often cries during sentimental moments, whether visiting historical sites like Sakamoto Ryōma's grave or watching nature documentaries. Having grown up near the ocean, he possesses extensive fishing knowledge from childhood experience. Unlike his colleagues, he welcomes work suspensions, particularly during health crises.
Hajime Miyamoto (宮本 一, Miyamoto Hajime)
Voiced by: Toshiki Masuda (Japanese); John Ramirez (English)
A 30-year-old Teiai executive from Hakodate. He is a blacksuited overseer who has supervised the underground facility for six years while residing alone in a private mansion. Initially distrustful of Ōtsuki's improbable cee-lo winning streak, he gradually warms to him after accompanying him on a government showroom tour. Their shared experience leads to friendship, marked by regular gourmet outings and sightseeing trips where the overseer demonstrates his loyalty. He displays unexpected compassion, visiting Ōtsuki during illness on his days off and becoming emotionally distressed during conflicts between Ōtsuki and Numakawa. A devoted cinephile with particular enthusiasm for foreign films, he also possesses extensive manga knowledge.

=== Underground labor facility ===
Odagiri (小田切)
Voiced by: Tomoaki Maeno (Japanese); Chris Hutchison (English)
The Squad C foreman rivals Ōtsuki by similarly exploiting his position to sell goods underground, including his popular "Hoppy Set" and operating a tablet-based movie business. He is not as accustomed to being on the outside world as Ōtsuki and avoids unfamiliar restaurants. He engages in a long-running spoiler war with Ōtsuki over new media, though they occasionally bond over shared frustrations. When a Rocky-inspired fitness trend disrupts the underground economy, both initially profit before unsuccessfully attempting to control the resulting market instability together.
Itai (板井)
The foreman of Squad A in the underground labor facility originates from Kumamoto Prefecture. A manga enthusiast like Ōtsuki, he was dismayed by the discontinuation of the Shōnen King magazine. The twice-divorced foreman has children, and speculates his marital failures may stem from recurring domestic frustrations, such as his wife consuming entire portions of prepared fruit without sharing.
Iwata (岩田)
The foreman of Squad B in the underground labor facility hails from Ōita Prefecture. A manga enthusiast like Ōtsuki and Itai, he shared their dismay at Shōnen King magazine's discontinuation. He successfully revitalized his previously unprofitable merchandise business through Lumonde products obtained at the Bourbon draft conference.
Young Laborer (青年労働者, Seinen rōdōsha)
A young worker from underground. He is constantly expressionless, but has the same gourmet taste as Ōtsuki. When he happened to be out on the same day as Ōtsuki, he went to the same restaurants and ordered the same food as Ōtsuki, and even impressed him with his peculiar toppings. Later on, he crossed paths with Ōtsuki again underground, and Ōtsuki could not help but ask for his name at the last minute.
Yamaki (山木)
Odagiri's close aide.
Akira Kuroki (黒木 明, Kuroki Akira)
A high school friend of Numakawa from Miyazaki Prefecture, this Squad E member frequently uses the local dialect, unlike Numakawa. An avid gambling enthusiast with particular passion for horse racing, he initially maintains an uneasy relationship with Numakawa after their graduation and Yamamoto's departure. Their shared interest in racing eventually rekindles their friendship. During his first visit to Tokyo, his enthusiastic use of dialect in public prompts Numakawa's disapproval, but he lifts Numakawa's spirits and they ultimately enjoy touring the city together while speaking their native dialect.
Masashi Yamamoto (山本 まさし, Yamamoto Masashi)
Numakawa and Kuroki's friend from high school. He was relatively versatile and had a personality that let him get along with anyone, and he was the reason Numakawa and Kuroki were playing so well together, but he had transferred to Tokyo to work in an entertainment production company. However, a week after Numakawa and Kuroki made friends with each other, he was sent underground and tried to chat with them about entertainment-related topics, but this only made it more awkward for them.
Moriguchi (森口)
A laborer who has been assigned to Squad E. Like Ōtsuki, he is an incomparable manga lover, and instead of working, he fell into debts he got from Teiai and was sent underground (a genuine manga freak, according to the narrator). He had a great time talking about manga with Ōtsuki, which also affected other foremen and Miyamoto, who had the same hobby.
Mizukami (水上)
A middle-aged laborer claims to have mastered out-of-body experience techniques, enabling him to leave the facility without an external pass for over six months. Though initially skeptical, Ōtsuki and others successfully replicate the method when attempting it themselves.
Matsuo (松尾)
A laborer from Saga Prefecture attends the "Kyushu People's Underground Gathering", where he converses with Numakawa about regional characteristics of Saga.
Satoshi Aida (相田 さとし, Aida Satoshi)
A laborer and former aspiring comedian. During an inspection of underground work, he becomes unintentionally involved in a conversation about candy initiated by Ōtsuki and his team. Unfamiliar with the man, Ōtsuki is privately perplexed by his presence. The laborer declares the financier to be the best cake, describing it as "deadly delicious".
Kai Kuramoto (倉本 海, Kuramoto Kai)
A popular actor known for his role as Buddy Red (Jin Nagatomo) in the tokusatsu series Friendship Squadron Buddy Rangers. His co-star, Jun Shiraishi (Buddy Blue), forces him into debt, leading him to work as a laborer in Squad C underground. While there, he engages in fan service by hosting handshake sessions, reprising his role as Buddy Red, and distributing potato chips to fellow workers. After Shiraishi repays his debts to Teiai, his release is confirmed within days, and he bids farewell to the laborers.

=== Related Teiai Group persons ===
Kazutaka Hyoudou (兵藤 和尊, Hyōdō Kazutaka)
An old man who is the chairman of the Teiai Group. When it is his or his henchmen's birthday, the prisoners of the underground labor facility are treated to a special menu, and if he is in a good mood he may also present them with new equipment, only to immediately confiscate it when his mood is spoiled.
Yukio Tonegawa (利根川 幸雄, Tonegawa Yukio)
Voiced by: Toshiyuki Morikawa (Japanese); David Harbold (English)
A high-ranking executive in the Teiai Group and the protagonist of the spin-off series Mr. Tonegawa, he encounters Ōtsuki in a crossover storyline where the two engage in a competitive confrontation over a large serving of katsudon.
Yoshihiro Kurosaki (黒崎 義裕, Kurosaki Yoshihiro)
One of the highest executives in the Teiai Group and a candidate for the No. 2 spot within the organization. He visits the underground labor facility and is shown around the area of Squad E by Miyamoto, but he notices and enjoys the fermented food made by Numakawa. As a result, he tries to take all of it away. Though he is stopped by Numakawa, his intimidating expression causes him to flinch, and he left underground with all the fermented food on hand.
Yanauchi (柳内)
A reclusive elderly blacksuit with professional-level soba-making skills cultivated over 30 years. As food service manager, he creates quality meals on a limited budget, earning the workers' reverence as the "Meal Messiah". His potential transfer causes unrest, which proves justified when the kitchen leadership is dismissed during a transition period.
Makita (牧田)
A member of the blacksuits, he is a single father of two who resides in Sendagi. Formerly Miyamoto's supervisor, he maintains his junior colleague's respect. A frequent visitor to the National Museum of Nature and Science, he possesses an exclusive long-term free pass and regularly takes his sons there. When encountering Ōtsuki and his group at the museum, he becomes annoyed by their uninformed enthusiasm about the renovations and proceeds to give them an accelerated tour.
Kawai (川井)
One of the blacksuits who used to be a pachislot employee. He became the new food service manager at the same time as Yanauchi's dismissal took place, but he is not a good cook. He is so determined that he eagerly tries to get Yanauchi to teach him how to cook.

=== Miscellaneous ===
Chef (女将, Joshō)
Voiced by: Hiroko Kiso (Japanese); Allison Sumrall (English)
The proprietress of a small restaurant called Miyuki demonstrates methodical cooking techniques that Ōtsuki considers beyond ordinary culinary skill. She prefers Western films to Japanese cinema. Ōtsuki, impressed by both the quality and affordability of her food, becomes a regular patron to the extent that the restaurant maintains a personal bottle of shochu for him. During a cherry blossom viewing event, Miyamoto welcomes her as a special guest, where she serves sushi wrapped in fried tofu.
Seiichi Kimura (木村 正一, Kimura Seiichi)
A former underground laborer from Saga Prefecture possesses a gentle nature that endears him to Ōtsuki and others. Having entered the facility during the economic collapse in his thirties, he spends twenty-five years underground with no outside contact, his knowledge limited to outdated periodicals. After release, he pays for Ōtsuki to accompany him during his anxious transition to surface life. Despite his initial naivety towards Ōtsuki's teasing, he protects him from assailants. He later works as a traffic manager, lives along the Seibu Line where Ōtsuki's group visits, and pursues a romantic interest in a bakery employee.
Toshiya Makita (牧田 俊也, Makita Toshiya)
Makita's first-born son. He visited the cherry blossom viewing camp with his father and brother. Numakawa taught him the rules of mahjong and they gave each other a thumbs-up when they said goodbye.
Hiroki Makita (牧田 弘樹, Makita Hiroki)
Makita's second son. He visited the cherry blossom viewing camp with his father and brother and bragged to the diner lady about the games he had brought with him, but he then gets tired of playing and falls sound asleep.
Taisei Numakawa (沼川 大生, Numakawa Taisei)
Numakawa's younger brother who is similar to him in both face and voice. He moves from Miyazaki to Tokyo for a job transfer and meets Ōtsuki's group who are waiting for him in front of Shinjuku station, where he meets his brother Takuya for the first time in six or seven years. He tells Ōtsuki and Isawa about his brother's true feelings at a bar and asks them to take care of him, but while Ōtsuki and Isawa are kind to him, his brother is hard on him. He later leaves the three of them with some money.
Obara (小原)
A hairdresser who previously wanted to be a novelist. He is 36 years old. He runs into Ōtsuki, who asked for an intestine stew. He tries to recommend Ōtsuki a Kendo Kobayashi-like hairstyle, which causes Ōtsuki's hair to look like Kobayashi's at the end of his outing. He chooses immortality immediately, given Nozaki's choices between immortality or dying now, but Nozaki points out that he does not understand true immortality. Later, he writes the first two lines of his novel, but falls asleep.
Nozaki (野崎)
A 20-year-old art college student joins a drinking party after becoming intrigued by Ōtsuki and Obara's conversation. An aspiring manga artist, he creates an overstuffed one-shot submission that earns Ōtsuki's praise despite its flaws. During a philosophical debate, he challenges the group to choose between immortality or immediate death, then critiques Obara's quick selection of immortality as naive. Demonstrating unexpected alcohol tolerance, he later revises his manga by adding an immortal protagonist, though editors note the work remains overly convoluted.
Jakob (ヤコブ, Yakobu)
A 42-year-old mountaineer who entered the conversation when Obara wondered if Ōtsuki enjoyed his current job. He has been an aspiring alpinist since he was 30 years old and is trying to climb Mt. Everest. He is good at Japanese.
Bacchus (バッカス, Bakkasu)
A boy's pet dog named Coro (コロ) encounters Ōtsuki in Tokyo Park after becoming separated from her owner. Though Ōtsuki successfully tames her, she demonstrates extreme gluttony and only obeys the "wait" command. The dog reunites with her owner shortly before Ōtsuki must return underground. When Ōtsuki issues his final "wait" command, she halts her pursuit and watches him depart.

== Publication ==
Written by Tensei Hagiwara and illustrated by Motomu Uehara and Kazuya Arai, 1-nichi Gaishutsuroku Hanchō started its serialization in Kodansha's seinen manga magazine Weekly Young Magazine on December 26, 2016. Kodansha has collected its chapters into individual tankōbon volumes. The first volume was published on June 6, 2017. As of October 6, 2026, 23 volumes have been released.

=== Volumes ===
| No. | Release date | ISBN |
|---|---|---|
| 1 | June 6, 2017 | 978-4-06-382973-0 |
1. "Throne" (玉座, Gyokuza); 2. "Travelling Companion" (道連, Michizure); 3. "Shoved In" (捻込, Takuitsu); 4. "Potato Soup" (飲芋, Nomiimo); 5. "All-You-Can-Eat Persimmon" (柿放, Kakihō); 6. "Past Life" (前世, Zensei); 7. "Hot Wind" (熱風, Neppū); Special Bonus Story: "Numakawa: 1-Day Suite Blues" (1日個室録ヌマカワ, 1-nichi Koshitsuroku Numakawa)
| 2 | September 6, 2017 | 978-4-06-510226-8 |
8. "Masterpiece" (名作, Meisaku); 9. "Breather" (一休, Hitoyasumi); 10. "Hamaguri Gate" (蛤門); 11. "Youth" (少年, Shōnen); 12. "Secret Ingredient" (隠味, Kakushiaji); 13. "Geezer Hunt" (爺狩, Jijigari); 14. "Demon" (邪神, Jashin); 15. "Careful Observation" (刮目, Katsumoku); 15.5. "Natural" (当然, Tōzen)
| 3 | March 6, 2018 | 978-4-06-511100-0 |
16. "Paradise" (極楽, Gokuraku); 17. "Summit" (首脳, Shunō); 18. "Pacific saury" (秋魚, Sanma); 19. "Chaos" (混沌, Konton); 20. "Gift" (賜物, Tamamono); 21. "Six Mats" (六帖, Rokujō); 22. "Tomorrow" (明日, Ashita); 23. "New Year's Eve" (年越, Toshikoshi)
| 4 | August 6, 2018 | 978-4-06-512471-0 |
24. "Weapon" (武器, Buki); 25. "Vagrancy" (流浪, Rurō); 26. "High and Low" (高低, Kōtei); 27. "Silence" (黙言, Danmari); 28. "Going to Bed" (就寝, Shūshin); 29. "Groundless" (実無, Jitsumu); 30. "Financial Results" (決算, Kessan); 31. "Scum Drop-Ins" (屑落, Kuzuochi)
| 5 | January 4, 2019 | 978-4-06-514180-9 |
32. "Soap Soaking" (汁浸, Shiruhitashi); 33. "Miyamoto's Birthday" (宮誕, Miyatan); 34. "Time Rush" (時駆, Tokikake); 35. "Beautiful Dreamer" (美夢, Mimu); 36. "Numakawa the Fermenter" (糠川, Nukagawa); 37. "Maturity" (成熟, Seijaku); 38. "In Tokyo" (都内, Tonai); 39. "Battlefield" (戦場, Senjō)
| 6 | July 5, 2019 | 978-4-06-516359-7 |
40. "Eulogy" (賛歌, Sanka); 41. "Love Story" (恋話, Koiwa); 42. "Name" (指名, Shimei); 43. "Snail" (巻貝, Makigai); 44. "Mob" (暴徒, Bōto); 45. "Good Sake" (旨酒, Umazake); 46. "Journey by Car" (車旅, Kurumatabi); 47. "Thick" (濃密, Nōmitsu)
| 7 | November 6, 2019 | 978-4-06-517725-9 |
48. "Gorgeous Sweat" (美汗, Mikan); 49. "Sleepwalking" (夢遊, Muyū); 50. "Salvation" (救世, Kyūsei); 51. "Humming" (鼻歌, Hanauta); 52. "Well-Trained" (鍛上, Kagami); 53. "Viewing" (観覧, Kanran); 54. "Gentleman" (紳士, Shinshi); 55. "Buying Clothes" (服買, Fukubai)
| 8 | April 6, 2020 | 978-4-06-519189-7 |
56. "Kyushu" (九州); 57. "Father's Meal" (父飯, Chichimeshi); 58. "Master and Servant" (主従, Shūjū); 59. "On-Foot Trip" (歩旅, Horyo); 60. "Good Dog" (良犬, Ryōken); 61. "On Sweets" (甘話, Kanwa); 62. "Delicious" (好吃, Haochī); 63. "Quiet Night" (静夜, Seiya)
| 9 | September 4, 2020 | 978-4-06-520453-5 |
64. "Catching Fish" (釣果, Chōka); 65. "Three Mats" (三畳, Sanjō); 66. "To the Capital" (上京, Jōkyō); 67. "Strong Man" (鉄人, Tetsujin); 68. "Squadron" (戦隊, Sentai); 69. "Starting Point" (起点, Kiten); 70. "Valuable Encounter" (一会, Ichie); 71. "Uneaten" (未食, Mishoku)
| 10 | January 6, 2021 | 978-4-06-522011-5 |
72. "Diary" (日記, Nikki); 73. "Social Distancing" (自粛, Jishuku); 74. "Self-Catering" (自炊, Jisui); 75. "Scorching Heat" (灼熱, Shakunetsu); 76. "First Sight" (一惚, Hitobore); 77. "Meal Scream" (食叫, Shoku-sakebi); 78. "Rain Shelter" (雨宿, Ameshuku); 79. "Amusement Park" (遊園, Yūen); 80. "On Marriage" (婚話, Konwa)
| 11 | May 6, 2021 | 978-4-06-523337-5 |
81. "Pygmy" (矮小, Waishō); 82. "Sugar Control" (糖制, Tōsei); 83. "Brothers" (兄弟, Kyōdai); 84. "Gift Certificate" (品券, Hinken); 85. "Skilled Mahjong" (雀鬼, Janki); 86. "Smolderers" (燻者, Kunsha); 87. "Tuna Head" (鮪頭, Maguroatama); 88. "Moving" (移転, Iten)
| 12 | September 6, 2021 | 978-4-06-524751-8 |
89. "Parasite" (寄生, Kisei); 90. "Duel" (決闘, Kettō); 91. "Wisdom Tooth" (智歯, Chishi); 92. "Leading Role" (主役, Shuyaku); 93. "Secret Trick" (裏技, Urawaza); 94. "Nightwear" (寝巻, Nemaki); 95. "Ticket" (切符, Kippu); Special Bonus Story: "Foreman vs. Ichijō" (ハンチョウ VS．イチジョウ, Hanchō vs. Ichijō)
| 13 | March 4, 2022 | 978-4-06-526787-5 |
| 14 | October 6, 2022 | 978-4-06-529076-7 |
| 15 | March 6, 2023 | 978-4-06-531047-2 |
| 16 | July 6, 2023 | 978-4-06-532343-4 |
| 17 | November 6, 2023 | 978-4-06-533624-3 |
| 18 | April 5, 2024 | 978-4-06-535245-8 |
| 19 | September 5, 2024 | 978-4-06-536859-6 |
| 20 | May 7, 2025 | 978-4-06-539620-9 |
| 21 | October 6, 2025 | 978-4-06-541156-8 |
| 22 | March 6, 2026 | 978-4-06-542875-7 |
| 23 | October 6, 2026 | 978-4-06-545174-8 |

== Other media ==
Part of the manga was adapted as segmented episodes within the Mr. Tonegawa anime series. A drama CD based on the series was included on the second DVD/Blu-ray Disc set of the Mr. Tonegawa anime series, released on March 27, 2019.

A cookbook, titled 1-nichi Gaishutsuroku Hanchō Kōshiki Otoko Meshi Reshipi (1日外出録ハンチョウ公式 男めしレシピ; lit. 'One-Day Outing Foreman: Official Men's Recipe'), was published by Kodansha on September 5, 2024. The book includes 35 recipes and a special chapter titled "Textbook" (料本, Ryōhon).

== Reception ==
1-nichi Gaishutsuroku Hanchō ranked second on Manga Shimbun Taishō in 2017. The series ranked eighth on Takarajimasha Kono Manga ga Sugoi!'s top 20 manga for male readers 2018.
