= Akio Koiso =

Japanese author

Akio Koiso (小磯 彰夫, Koiso Akio), born 1942, is a Japanese author.

== Early life ==
Koiso was born in Chichiharu, Manchuria, in 1942. He attended Hosei University and graduated from the Department of Applied Economics in 1966.

== Banking career ==
Koiso worked for Fuji Bank until his retirement in 2001. His experiences working for the bank formed the basis for his first book, Account of a Fuji Bank Employee (富士銀行行員の記録, Fuji Ginkōin no kiroku).

== Writing career ==
Koiso’s Account of a Fuji Bank Employee was published in 1991. One of the earliest biographical accounts of the life of a Japanese Sarariman ("Salaryman"), it became a bestseller in the then popular financial scandal genre. Patrick Smith, who interviewed Koiso, writes that he "broke the colossal silence of the corporate warrior" by recounting stories of "'coercive labor,' intimidating managers, corrupt union officials, executive suicides, karoshi incidents, 'service overtime' scams, vindictive personnel departments, and employees banished to various Siberias for being too independent of mind."

Koiso, concerned about working conditions at the bank, rose to the top of the local union representation. This led to him being reassigned to isolated rural bank branches as punishment, although he earned the support of his branch managers. Corporate retaliation did not soften his views, as Koiso believes that "[t]his kind of contradiction—depending on internationally unacceptable working conditions to become an international company—cannot go on forever."

Koiso also wrote other business books, including The Collapse of Japanese Management, (日本的経営の崩壊, Nihon teki keiei no hōkai) published in 1996 and Advice for a Proud Life as an Ordinary Employee, ( 誇り高き平社員人生のすすめ, Hokori takaki hira shain jinsei no susume) published in 2000.

== Research institute ==
In 2001, after his retirement from Fuji Bank, Koiso created the Koiso Daiwa Employee Life Research Institute, which he ran from 2001 to 2010. The institute published a quarterly journal called the Proud Regular Employee. The institute produced 40 issues over 10 years.
