= Simultaneous recruiting of new graduates =

Japanese hiring practice

In Japan, simultaneous recruiting of new graduates or periodic recruiting of new graduates (新卒一括採用, Shinsotsu-ikkatsu-saiyō) is the business custom in which companies hire new university graduates en masse. This custom was practiced in South Korea until a 2010 age discrimination law banned the practice. In 2018 the Japan Business Federation (Keidanren) announced that its 1,600 member companies, which represent a large portion of Japan's big business companies, would no longer be required to follow the custom from 2020 onwards.

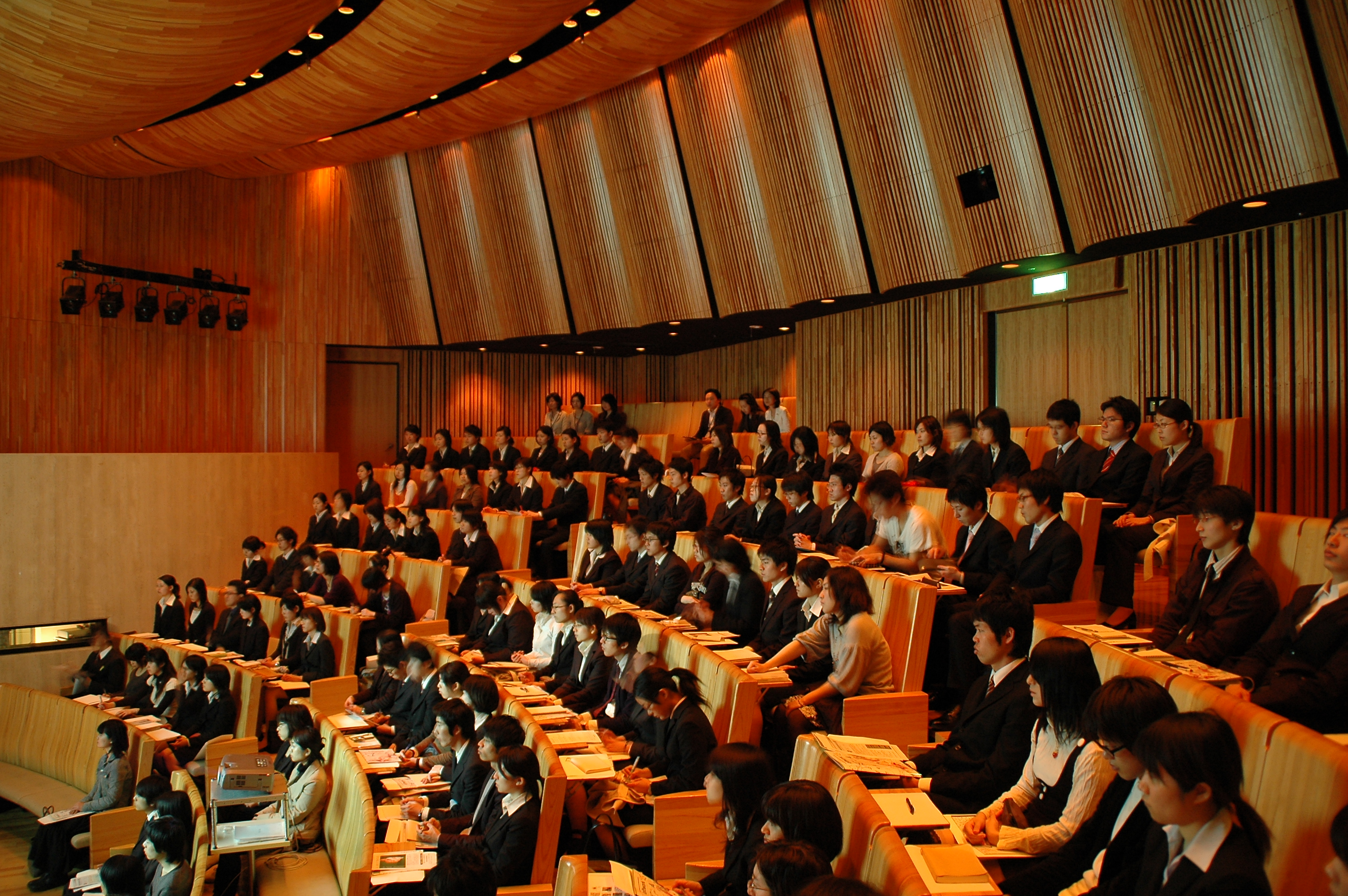
A company information session for new graduates in Japan. Japanese major companies tend to hold sessions only for students in particular prestigious universities.

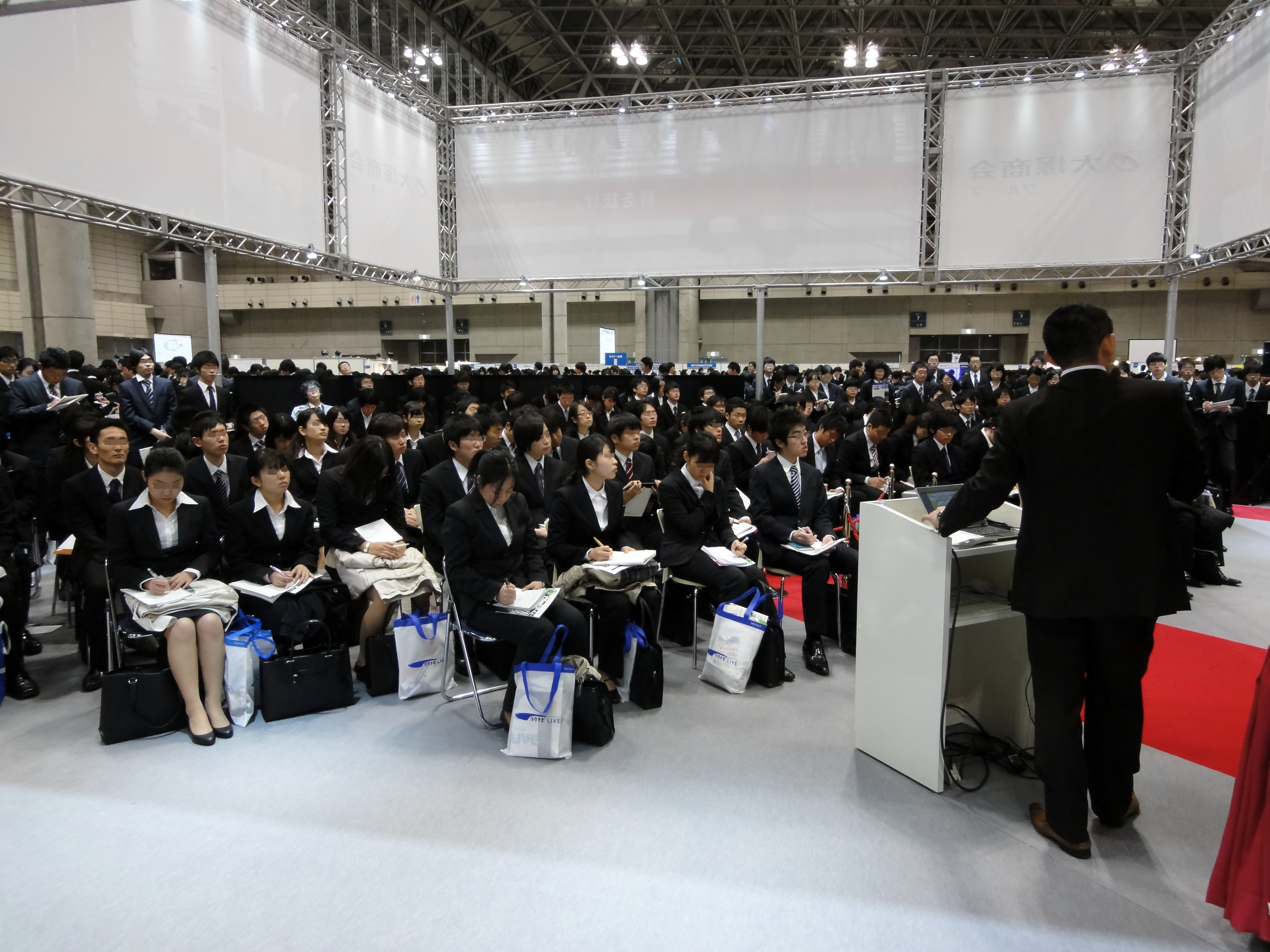
A company information session for new graduates in Japan

== Hiring practices ==
In Japan, most students hunt for jobs before graduation from university or high school, seeking "informal offers of employment" (内定, naitei) one year before graduation, which will hopefully lead to a "formal offer of employment" (正式な内定, seishiki na naitei) six months later, securing them a promise of employment by the time they graduate. Japanese university students generally begin job hunting all at once in their third year.

The government permits companies to begin the selection process and give out informal offers beginning April 1, at the start of the fourth year. These jobs are mainly set to begin on April 1 of the following year. Due to this process, attaining a good position as a regular employee at any other time of year, or any later in life, is extremely difficult.

Since companies prefer to hire new graduates, students who are unsuccessful in attaining a job offer upon graduating often opt to stay in school for another year. According to a survey conducted by Mynavi, nearly 80% of job-seekers who had recently graduated from university had difficulty applying for entry-level positions in Japan. This is in contrast to other countries, where companies do not generally discriminate against those who have recently graduated.

By contrast, potential employees in Japan are largely judged by their educational background. The prestige of the university and high school that a student attends has a marked effect on their ability to find similarly sought-after jobs as adults.

Large companies in particular (e.g. those listed in Nikkei 225), prefer to hire new graduates of prestigious universities "in bulk" to replace retiring workers and groom in-house talent, and the numbers can vary widely from year to year. Employers tend to hire a group of people in a mechanical fashion every year. One example is Toyota; the company hired over 1,500 new graduates in 2010, but this number was barely half of the number employed the year before, and Toyota announced its intention to cut new hires in 2011 further down to 1,200. The company may offer more jobs later on, but those who missed out on the current round of hiring will have a slim chance of gaining a position because they will be overshadowed by fresh graduates.

According to the nonprofit group Lifelink's survey conducted in July 2013, one in five Japanese college students thought about committing suicide during the job-hunting process.

The shūkatsu system is under strain due to Japan's shrinking population and competition from foreign and nontraditional companies.

=== Lifetime employment ===
Shūshin koyō (終身雇用; "employment for life") is the term for permanent employment in Japan. It was extremely common in major Japanese companies, beginning with the first economic successes in the 1920s. It continued to be a defining characteristic of Japanese corporate culture through the Japanese post-war economic miracle, but its prominence waned after the bursting of the Japanese asset price bubble, the Lost Decade and subsequent economic reforms. Shūshin koyō starts with an event called Shinsotsu-ikkatsu-saiyō (simultaneous recruiting of new graduates) in which a large cohort of recent university graduates all enter a company at once. It gave Japanese workers the important feeling of job security as part of Japanese management culture, and in turn, elicited a high degree of company loyalty. A high demand for the few available engineers forced companies to bind these employees to the company. The collapse of the Japanese asset price bubble and the following crisis in the 1990s did not weaken the practice. Some critics of lifetime employment hoped that with Junichiro Koizumi's administration, lifetime employment would become less common. They hoped that neoliberal economics policies would result in privatization, firing of old and expensive workers, and the rise of part-time jobs. Due to the Great Recession and the 2008 financial crisis, some companies discontinued the practice of shūshin koyō and implement mass layoffs. Thus, there was less job security as shūshin koyō was challenged.

However, as noted by researcher Koji Takahashi in 2019: "in the case of regular workers, the practice of long-term employment is maintained, in the sense that both employers and labor unions still seek to avoid making dismissals or voluntary retirement solicitations."

A 2010 study found that most Japanese workers are not in "lifetime employment", and that at most 20% of workers can be said to have it. Estimating the precise number is difficult because it is not enshrined in employment contracts.

== Criticism ==
This custom has been seen to cause many social problems in modern Japan. Students who do not reach a decision about their employment before graduating from university often face great hardships searching for a job after the fact, as the majority of Japanese companies prefer to hire students scheduled to graduate in the spring. In recent years, an increasing number of university seniors looking for jobs have chosen to repeat a year to avoid being placed in the "previous graduate" category by companies. Under the current system, Japanese companies penalize students who study overseas or have already graduated.

Reiko Kosugi, a research director at the Japan Institute for Labor Policy and Training, criticized this process in a 2006 essay in The Asia-Pacific Journal, saying, "If business is in a slump at the point of one's graduation and he cannot get a job, this custom produces inequality of opportunity, and people in this age bracket tend to remain unemployed for a long time." Nagoya University professor Mitsuru Wakabayashi has stated, "If this custom is joined to permanent employment, it produces closed markets of employment, where outplacement is hard, and the employees tend to obey any and all unreasonable demands made by their companies so as not to be fired."

Yuki Honda, a professor at the University of Tokyo's Graduate School of Education, has said "Whether they get a job when they graduate decides their whole life". Ken Mogi, a Japanese brain scientist, points out that limiting job opportunities would lead to a human rights issue and that Japanese companies cannot secure non-traditional competent people in the current job hunting system.

The strictness of the "recruit suits" (リクルートスーツ), hairstyles, and even employers' demands on how a recruit may sit has been criticized as sexist. Non-binary and transgender individuals also criticize the process, as it does not allow for gender variance.

Shūshoku katsudō (就職活動), which is abbreviated to Shūkatsu (就活), starts in April and ends during the hiring season each year from August to October. Japanese university students who fail to receive a job offer often must wait a year to repeat the process competing against the following year's graduating students, and those graduates are referred to as shūshoku rōnin (就職浪人), borrowing the term for a masterless samurai. The stress involved has been cited as a factor in suicide in Japan.

== See also ==
- Japanese work environment
- Salaryman
- Suicide in Japan
- Jaesusaeng
