= Watami =

Japanese restaurant chain

Watami Co., Ltd
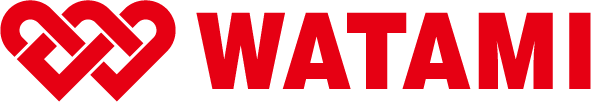

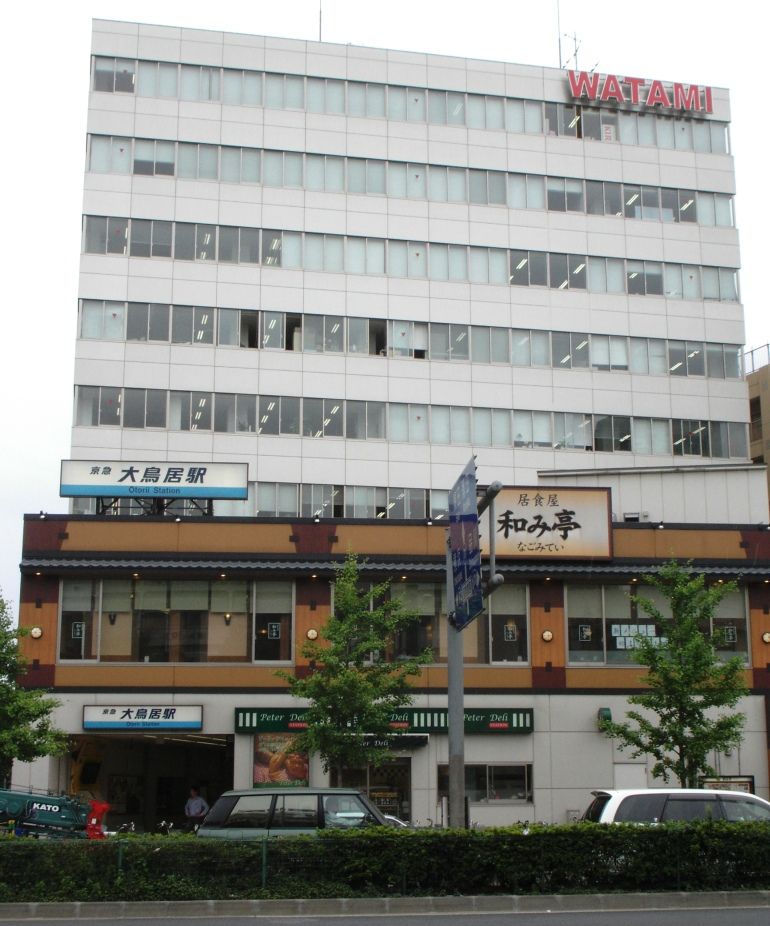
- Headquarters in Ōta, Tokyo
- Native name: ワタミ株式会社
- Romanized name: Kabushiki-gaisha Watami
- Formerly: Watami Foodservice Co., Ltd. (1987-2005)
- Type: Kabushiki gaisha
- Traded as: TYO: 7533
- Industry: Food service
- Founded: May 1, 1986; 40 years ago
- Founder: Miki Watanabe
- Headquarters: 〒144-0043; 1-1-3, Haneda, Ōta, Tokyo, Japan
- Website: Official website

Watami is a Japanese business group known for its izakaya restaurants.

== History ==
Miki Watanabe first opened an izakaya restaurant under the Tsubohachi franchise in 1984. In 1986, he established the Watami Co. Ltd. Watanabe then operated the izakaya under the Watami brand name in 1992, with the concept of "family izakaya" instead of "pub izakaya", and converted the Tsubohachi branches under his operation into Watami branches. In 2007, Watami had about 625 outlets under nine izakaya and restaurant brands globally.

Watami is also involved in other businesses such as farming and eldercare. In 2002, it set up Watami Farming to provide its restaurants with organic vegetables at low cost as the market price of organic vegetables were eating into its profit margin. It established its healthcare interest in 2004 and by 2007, Watami ran 25 nursing homes.

Mina Mori, a 26-year-old employee of its namesake restaurant chain, committed suicide two months after joining the company in 2008. Her family lodged a complaint with the Yokosuka Labor Standards Office to seek recognition of the suicide as work-related. When their claim was denied, they appealed it to the Kanagawa Prefectural Labor Bureau, which recognized work-related stress as the cause of the decline of her mental health. In December 2015, Watami reached an out-of-court settlement of 130 million yen with the family, and Watami founder Miki Watanabe apologized. The Watami group has faced criticism as a "black company" for its harsh treatment of employees, and was voted the worst company in Japan to work for in 2012 and 2013.

In 2020, it exited from China due to the COVID-19 pandemic, and returned to the market in 2021.

At the end of 2023, it announced that it would be acquiring Singapore-based Leader Food and two related companies, Leader Food Industries and Premium Seafood Supplies, in its first overseas acquisition for S$9.2 million in exchange of 80% stakes in the three companies, to augment its international supply chain.

On 13 November 2026, Watami announced plans to go private through a management buyout led by founder Miki Watanabe. The proposed transaction would result in its delisting from the Tokyo Stock Exchange if successful. Watanabe's company Wisdom offered ¥1,284 per share, with the tender offer scheduled to close on 28 December 2026.

== Brands ==
Watami's restaurant brands include:

- bb.q Olive Chicken Cafe (bb.qオリーブチキンカフェ)
- Delicious Fried Chicken and Izakaya Meals Mirai-zaka (旨唐揚げと居酒メシ ミライザカ)
- Kamimura Farm (かみむら牧場)
- Karaage Genius (から揚げの天才)
- Shirokuma Store (しろくまストア)
- Subway Japan (サブウェイ)
- Sushi no Wa (すしの和)
- TGI Fridays Japan (TGIフライデーズ)
- Third Generation Torimero (三代目鳥メロ)
- Wang's Garden (中華 四川料理)
- Watami's Specialty Goods Street (和民のこだわりのれん街)
- Yakiniku Watami (焼肉の和民)
