= Japanese work environment =

Environment reflecting work conditions in Japan

The work environment in Japan encompasses working conditions, employment practices, workplace culture and labour regulation. Employment in large Japanese firms has historically been associated with long-term employment and seniority-based career structures, although these practices have not applied uniformly across firms or categories of workers. Average annual working hours have declined substantially since the late twentieth century, as concerns about overwork-related illness and mental health led to public debate and labour reforms.

== Working conditions ==
=== Working hours ===
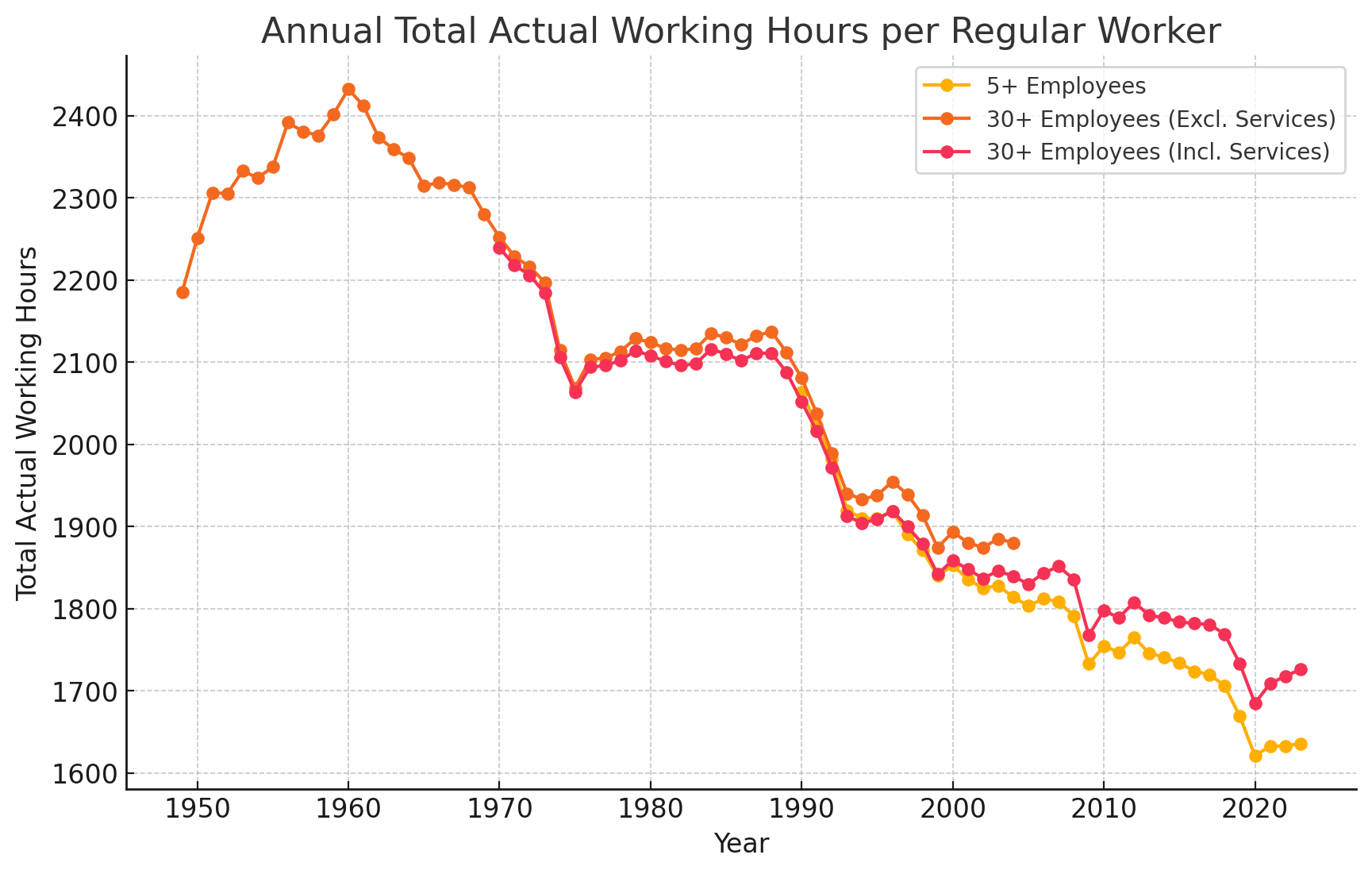
Average annual hours actually worked per worker in Japan from 1947 to 2023

Japanese working hours have been gradually decreasing. In 1986, the average employee worked 2,097 hours in Japan, compared with 1,828 hours in the United States and 1,702 in France. On average, employees worked a forty-six-hour week in 1987; employees of most large corporations worked a modified five-day week with two Saturdays a month, while those in most small firms worked as much as six days each week. In the face of mounting international criticism of excessive working hours in Japan, in January 1989, public agencies began closing two Saturdays a month. Japanese labor unions made reduced working hours an important part of their demands, and many larger firms responded positively. By 1995, the average annual hours in Japan had decreased to 1,884 and, by 2009, to 1,714.

Average annual hours actually worked per worker in OECD countries from 1970 to 2020

In 2019, the average Japanese employee worked 1,644 hours, lower than workers in Spain, Canada, and Italy. By comparison, the average American worker worked 1,779 hours in 2019. In 2021 the average annual work-hours dropped to 1633.2, slightly higher than 2020's 1621.2. Between 2012 and 2021, the average working hours drop was 7.48%.

The average Japanese worker is mandated to have ten to twenty days of paid holidays per year, depending on the number of continuous years worked at the company. Japan has consistently ranked last in per hour productivity among the G7 countries, despite the long work hours since the 1970s. In 2020, Japan ranked 23rd, below Lithuania in per-hour labor productivity compared to other OECD nations.

=== Employment security ===
Japanese employment protection is unique and dynamic compared to other nations. Loyalty to one's company is paramount in Japanese society. Many Japanese firms only promote from within; as a result, individuals may stay with the same company for their entire life. Japanese workers seek to invest and improve their company, while firms attempt to maintain a family atmosphere and look after employees. Disappointing coworkers, calling in sick, and having a poor attitude are unacceptable. Firms in Japan do everything in their power to ensure employment security and prevent laying off employees. Firms' attempts at prevention may include negotiating better deals with suppliers, requesting government subsidies, and eliminating overtime. The relationship between employer and employee promotes employment security, work ethic, and willingness to work long hours.

=== Impact on Japan's welfare state ===
Liberal and conservative philosophies combine to form Japan's welfare state. The welfare state and working conditions are interconnected. As a result of declining working hours over the years, less stress was put on the welfare state. In 2012, the average Japanese citizen visited a medical facility twelve times: three times more doctors' visits than the average United States citizen. This is partly due to low-cost medical expenses and partly due to increased stress from working conditions.

Stress has a huge negative impact on physiological and mental factors for individuals. Work hours vary between firms and company size. In medium to large-sized companies, hours have increased. The stress from working over twelve hours a day contributes to Japanese citizens' frequent medical visits. That a majority of Japanese hospitals are privately owned alludes to conservative influence; the government enforcing strict regulations and pricing on medical treatment alludes to the liberal aspect of their welfare state.

The general Japanese health insurance system resembles a dualist one. The National Health Insurance (Kokumin-Kenkō-Hoken) is directed regionally and provides mandatory health insurance to the non-employed citizenry. Until age 70, those covered by the National Health Insurance must self-finance 30% of their medical costs. Firms are required to provide mandatory health insurance to employees under Employees Health and Pension Insurance, or Shakai Hoken. For the employed, maintaining this access to healthcare is greatly tied to their employment security. As a result, the cost of losing a job also includes losing access to the expansive benefits of employer-provided healthcare insurance. Leaving the workforce due to dismissal, family complications, or health-related issues can potentially diminish access to welfare benefits. Due to the high mandated costs on firms imposed by the Employees Health Insurance scheme, the incentive to provide increased non-mandatory welfare provisions is undermined.

Declining health conditions in the Japanese labor force and the issue of overtime work have led to policy expansion and reform on behalf of the Ministry of Health, Labor, and Welfare. As of March 2018, the Labour Standards Act states that an employer should not exceed a 40-hour work week for employees. Exceeding this work week requires an exclusive worker-management agreement, and overtime and this work is to be compensated for with a corresponding wage increase. For example, overtime and night work require an increase of 25% at the minimum. The increasing cases of Karōshi, or health and workplace accidents resulting from overtime work have led to reforms in the Industrial Health and Safety Law as well. Although non-binding, these reforms mandate employers to arrange for overtime workers to be provided with health guidance.

=== Resignation ===
Quitting a job is highly frowned upon in Japanese work culture, and employees who quit often face harassment, intimidation, bargaining and guilt when giving their notice. Employees are culturally discouraged from quitting jobs even if they are facing severe mistreatment in the workplace. Younger generations of Japanese employees have expressed discontent with these norms and in recent years a proxy resignation industry has taken hold. Employees seeking to quit their job will pay an organization to notify their employer, complete paperwork, return workplace property and handle pushback from employers.

== Karoshi ==
Karoshi is death associated with overwork, including cases involving cardiovascular disease and suicide. In 2016, labour authorities recognised the suicide of Matsuri Takahashi, a 24-year-old employee of advertising company Dentsu, as work-related after she had recorded 105 hours of overtime in one month. Her death prompted official investigations of Dentsu and renewed public and political debate over overtime regulation in Japan.

== Future ==
There is a growing shift in Japanese working conditions, due to both the government intervention as a result of declining birth rates and labour productivity, and companies competing for increasingly scarce numbers of workers due to a drop in the working-age population as a result of low birth rates. Many Japanese companies are reducing work hours and improving working conditions, including by providing amenities such as sports facilities and gyms. The Japanese government is pushing through a bill that would make it compulsory for employees to take a minimum of five days leave, and to ensure that high-income employees in certain sectors such as finance be paid according to performance rather than hours worked.

The issue of work conditions was even prioritised by the former Prime Minister Shinzo Abe. In 2019, the Act on the Arrangement of related Acts to Promote Work Style Reform, which is also known as the Work Style Reform Act, was passed by the National Diet. This law sought to reform eight key labour laws to improve working conditions.

== See also ==
- Labour unions in Japan
- Black company (Japan)
- Simultaneous recruiting of new graduates
- Japanese employment law
- Japanese management culture
- Salaryman
- Japanese blue collar workers
- 996 working hour system
