= Premium Friday =

Japanese campaign promoting consumer spending

Premium Friday is a campaign to promote consumer spending advocated by the Japanese government and Japanese business organizations. It had been expected to have a favorable effect to the movement to improve work style.

The campaign was temporarily suspended during the COVID-19 outbreak, and the official site promoting Premium Friday stopped updating after October 2022. The site was eventually shut down on June 1, 2023.

== Background ==
It is a campaign promoted by the Japanese business sector led by the Government of Japan and Japan Business Federation recommending to spend more enriched life every last Friday each month. Tied up with a movement to improve work style, it is recommending to end work at 15:00. Since last Friday of a month end tends to be when salary has just been paid, it is advocating to spend the afternoon shopping or travelling. This has been implemented on February 24, 2017.

The initiative is part of an attempt to address the punishingly long hours many Japanese are expected to work, prompted by the suicide of a 24-year-old employee at the advertising firm Dentsu who was doing more than 100 hours' overtime in the months before her death. While some major companies, such as Honda, the drinks maker Suntory and the confectioner Morinaga, have adopted the optional scheme, others are less enthusiastic about the prospect of a mid-afternoon staff exodus. A survey of 155 big companies by the Nikkei business newspaper showed that 45% had no immediate plans to implement the scheme, with 37% saying they had either decided to enter into the spirit of Premium Friday or had plans to do so.
