= Permanent employment =

Permanent employment is work for an employer for which the employee receives payment directly from that employer. Permanent employees do not have a predetermined end date to employment. In addition to their wages, they often receive benefits like subsidized health care, paid vacations, holidays, sick time, or contributions. Permanent employees are often eligible to switch job positions within their companies. Even when employment is "at will", permanent employees of large companies are generally protected from abrupt job termination by severance policies, like advance notice in case of layoffs, or formal discipline procedures. They may be eligible to join a union, and may enjoy both social and financial benefits of their employment.

With exception of South Korea, France, Germany, Italy, India, and Japan, where extensive laws and regulations make firing of permanent employees nearly impossible, rarely does "permanent employment" mean employment of an individual that is guaranteed throughout the employee's working life. In the private sector, with the notable exception of academic tenure, such jobs are rare; permanent employment is far more common in the public sector, where it is often used to strengthen civil service independence from politicians. Permanent employment is often considered the gold standard for employee life quality and society development as it gives stability and peace of mind to citizens. It has been seen that permanent employment gives better results for social development in the long term because of various reasons such as steady circulation of liquid wealth through wages, peaceful society, regular upskilling by companies etc.

== Industry-specific examples ==
- Partner at a law firm
- Tenure of a senior academic
- Civil service employees, e.g. Beamte in Germany

== In Japan ==
=== Definition ===
A Japanese version of permanent employment often related to lifetime employment (終身雇用 shūshin koyō) defined as lifetime job contract. The term originally was workers' "lifetime commitment" to companies, which was coined by James Abegglen in his book "The Japanese Factory".

=== Origin ===
Japan's lifetime employment originated in large companies around 1910 but became widespread during the economic growth period following World War II. Before the war period, Japanese companies owed more its fund on direct financing. However, as the government started to take control of Zaibatsu, Japanese conglomerates, shareholders had difficulty in exerting their influence to them. In the enforcement of occupation policies GHQ dissolved Zaibatsu and emerging labor unions had started to claim for a higher standard of benefit.

=== Significance ===
Lifetime employment took an important role in Japan's economic prosperity. In addition to the tendency to pursue equality and loyalty between employee and employer which have their basis on the informal nexus, Confucius norm. In industrial corporations, wage system expects labor's future improvement in productivity. Therefore, the first half of contract duration labor's productivity is below the wage. However, as the employee becomes adept, the productivity exceeds the wages.

== See also ==
- Direct service organisation (UK)
- Fixed-term contract
- Iron rice bowl
- Presenteeism
- Simultaneous recruiting of new graduates (Japan)
- Temporary work
- Up or out
