= Ho-Ren-Sō =

Japanese business term

"Hō-Ren-Sō" (報・連・相) is a business mantra or mnemonic acronym in Japanese business culture. It is an abbreviation of "Hōkoku" (報告, to report), "Renraku" (連絡, to inform) and "Sōdan" (相談, to consult), and is more memorable as a homonym of hōrensō, the Japanese word for "spinach". It is utilised as a basic business rule in Japan to conduct smooth business communication. The origin of "Ho-Ren-So" comes from Tomiji Yamazaki who was the ex-president of Yamatana Security firm. In 1982 he started using the term for effective business communication in his firm and it has been widely spread and used throughout Japan through his book titled Strengthen Your Company with Ho-Ren-So.

== Description ==
Hōkoku is to report on a process or result of business, from a subordinate to a superior. In Japan, subordinates do not have much authority to make business decisions. Usually, decisions are made by an organisation as a whole. Therefore, a subordinate must report everything to their superior(s) as immediate and accurately as they can. It is especially important to report a mistake or a problem immediately, as one's superiors hold responsibility for it.

Renraku is to inform and notify of facts. One must inform relevant parties about facts and decisions, without including opinions or guesses. This is especially crucial to facilitate organization, teamwork and cooperation. These facts should also be communicated to only people who need to hear them. Renraku often refers to key facts or information an organization will need to use in order to make a decision, therefore this process must be done with haste and precision.

Sōdan is to consult or discuss. For example, a superior should give advice to a subordinate, and employees should talk over their work with superiors.

== Pros and cons ==
Benefits of the Ho-Ren-So philosophy include the ability for issues to be resolved quickly as they are communicated effectively to managers, who then decide how to resolve the situation at hand. Additionally, if information is made known to all members of a team, ownership of the schedule and tasks can be divided up. Finally, if a subordinate proactively asks for information, a decrease of quality will be prevented and likely won't occur again.

Ho-Ren-So also comes with management costs. It is a time-consuming process, leaving employees with little time to complete their various work assignments. Moreover, since subordinate must wait for instructions from supervisors, this prevents employees from applying problem-solving skills on their own, and initiative is prevented by the constant need for managerial input, leading to micromanagement.
