= Karoshi =

Sudden death from overwork

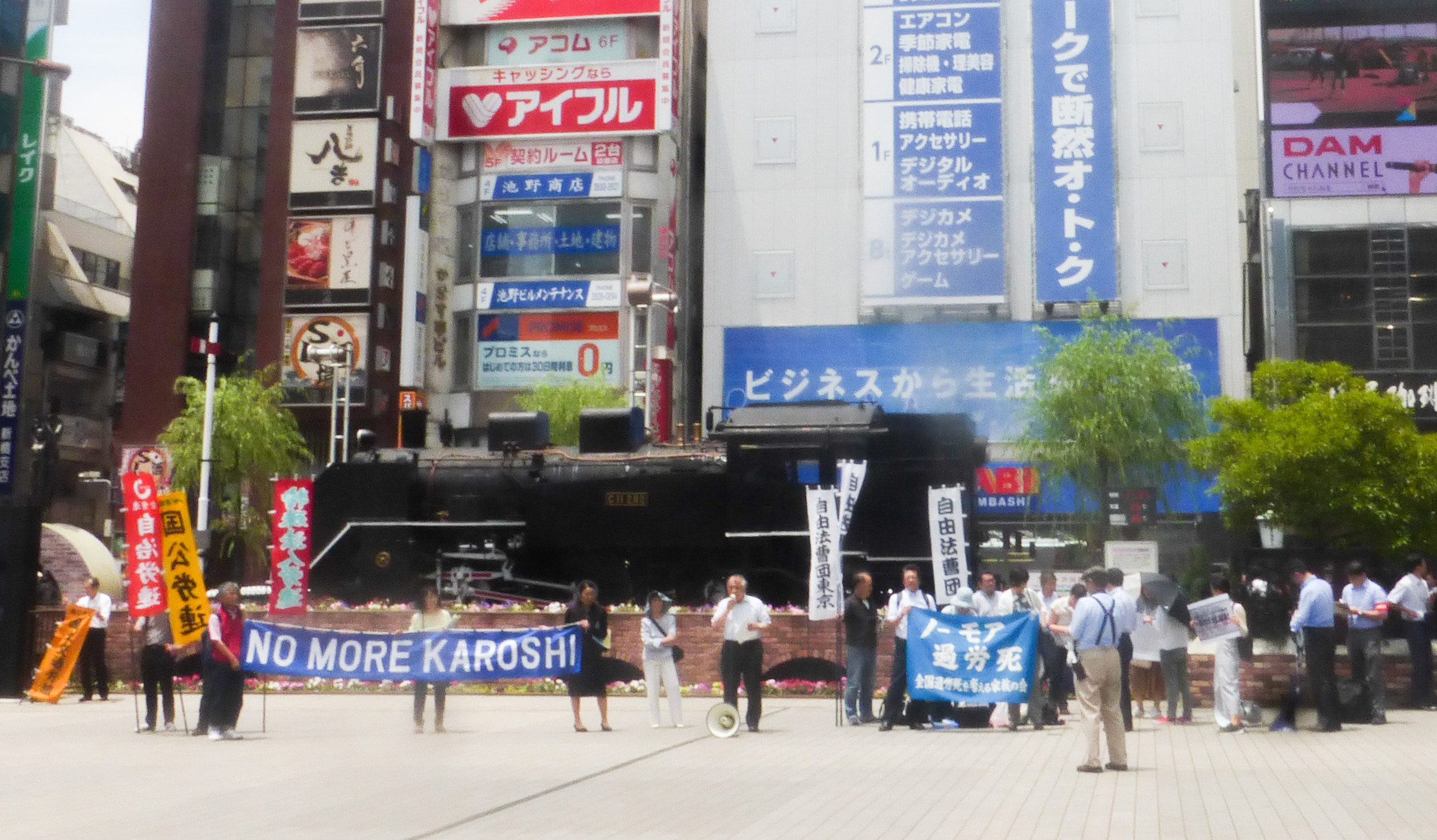
A "No More Karoshi" protest in Tokyo, 2018

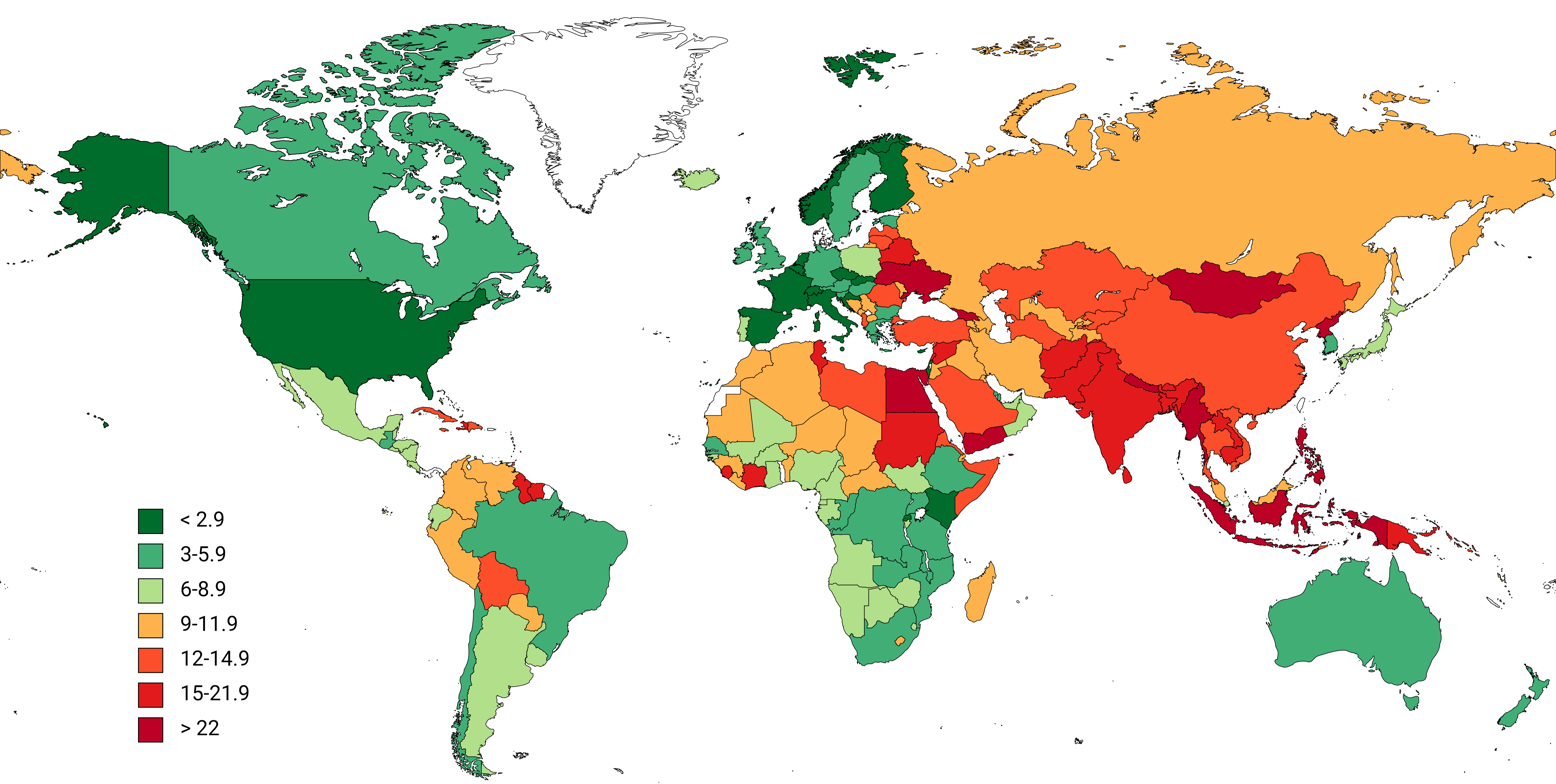
Deaths due to long working hours per 100,000 people in 2016 (15+)

Average annual hours actually worked per worker in OECD countries from 1970 to 2020

Karoshi (Japanese: 過労死, Hepburn: Karōshi), which can be translated into 'overwork death', is a Japanese term relating to occupation-related sudden death.

The most common medical causes of karoshi deaths are heart attacks and strokes due to stress and malnourishment or fasting. Mental stress from the workplace can also cause workers to commit suicide in a phenomenon known as karōjisatsu (過労自殺).

Karoshi is also widespread in other parts of Asia. Generally, deaths from overwork are a worldwide occurrence. For example, over 770 wage labourers die of overwork annually in Sweden, a country with robust labour regulations.

== History ==
The first case of karoshi was reported in 1969 with the stroke-related death of a 29-year-old male worker in the shipping department of Japan's largest newspaper company.

In 1988, the Labor Force Survey reported that almost one fourth of the male working employees worked over 60 hours per week (equivalent of two-and-a-half days), which is 50% longer than a typical 40-hour (equivalent of over one-day-and-a-half) weekly working schedule. Realizing the seriousness and widespread nature of this emerging problem, a group of lawyers and doctors set up "karoshi hotlines" that are nationally available, dedicated to helping those who seek consultation on karoshi-related issues.

Japan's rise from the devastation of World War II to economic prominence and the huge war reparations they have paid in the post-war decades have been regarded as the trigger for what has been called a new epidemic. It was recognized that employees cannot work for 12 or more hours a day, 6–7 days a week, year after year, without suffering physically as well as mentally.

In an April 2013 International Labour Organization (ILO) article about karoshi, the following four typical cases of karoshi were mentioned:

1. Mr. A worked at a major snack food processing company for as long as 110 hours a week (equivalent of four and a half days) and died from a heart attack at the age of 34. His death was recognized as work-related by the Labour Standards Office.
2. Mr. B, a bus driver, whose death was also recognized as work-related, worked 3,000 hours a year (equivalent of four months). He did not have a day off in the 15 days before he had a stroke at the age of 37.
3. Mr. C worked in a large printing company in Tokyo for 4,320 hours a year including night work (equivalent of nearly six months, thus half a year) and died from a stroke at the age of 58. His widow received workers' compensation 14 years after her husband's death.
4. Ms. D, a 22-year-old nurse, died from a heart attack after 34 hours of continuous duty five times a month.

As well as physical pressure, mental stress from the workplace can cause karoshi. People who die by suicide due to mental stress are called karōjisatsu (過労自殺). The ILO also lists some causes of overwork or occupational stress that include the following:

1. All-night, late-night or holiday work, both long and excessive hours. During the long-term economic recession after the collapse of the bubble economy in the 1980s and 1990s, many companies reduced the number of employees. The total amount of work, however, did not decrease, forcing each employee to work harder.
2. Stress accumulated due to frustration at not being able to achieve the goals set by the company. Even in economic recession, companies tended to demand excessive sales efforts from their employees and require them to achieve better results. This increased the psychological burden placed on the employees at work.
3. Forced resignation, dismissal, and bullying. For example, employees who worked for a company for many years and saw themselves as loyal to the company were suddenly asked to resign because of the need for staff cutbacks.
4. Suffering of middle management. They were often in a position to lay off workers and torn between implementing a corporate restructuring policy and protecting their staff.

== Karoshi Hotline ==
In a 1988 report published by the Karoshi Hotline Network, the majority of the clients who consulted were not workers, but the wives of the workers who had either died because of karoshi or were at high risk of doing so. This indicated that those who were stressed out by work either did not realize the cause was overwork or were under social pressure to not express it explicitly or to seek help.

The Karoshi Hotline received the highest number of calls when it was first established in 1988. From 1988 to 1990, there were a total number of 1806 calls received. From 1990 to 2007, the number of calls received per year was lower, but has not shown a clear trend of further decrease.

== Effects on society ==
Suicide can be induced by overwork-related stress or when people are dismissed. The deceased person's families demand damages when such deaths occur. Life insurance companies started putting one-year exemption clauses in their contracts. They did this so that the person must wait one year to commit suicide in order for the family to receive the money.

There is a new movement of Japanese workers, formed as a result of karoshi. Compared to older Japanese people who often work overtime, young Japanese people are preferring part-time work. This is a new style of career choice for the young Japanese people who want to try out different jobs in order to figure out their own potential. These individuals work for "hourly wages rather than regular salaries," and are called "freeters." The number of freeters has increased throughout the years, from 200,000 in the 1980s to about 400,000 in 1997.

Freeters undergo a special kind of employment, defined by Atsuko Kanai as those who are currently employed and referred to as "part-time workers or arbeit (temporary workers), who are currently employed but wish to be employed as part time workers, or who are currently not in the labor force and neither doing housework nor attending school but wish to be employed only as part-time workers."

== Government policies ==
To provide a strategic plan to decrease the rate of karoshi, the National Institute of Health proposed the establishment of a comprehensive industrial health service program to reduce karoshi and other diseases caused by work-related stress in its 2005 annual report. The program requires communal efforts from the following groups:

1. The government, as the policy maker, should promote shorter working hours, make health services readily accessible, encourage voluntary health examination and enhance the effectiveness of medical care.
2. As the group that is more closely involved with the everyday health of employees, labor unions and employers should strive to implement and comply with government policies that focus on reducing work overtime and creating a better work environment.
3. The employees themselves should recognize the need to take rests regularly and take preventive measures as needed.

As a formal response to this proposal, the Industry Safety and Health Act was revised in 2006. The Act established various terms that focus on work-related health issues, including mandatory health checks and consultations with professional medical personnel for employees who work long hours and have a higher probability of having work related illnesses.

== Corporate response ==
Many companies have been making an effort to find a better work–life balance for their employees. Toyota generally limits overtime to 360 hours a year (an average of 30 hours monthly), and, at some offices, issues public address announcements every hour after 7 p.m. pointing out the importance of rest and urging workers to go home. Nissan allows for remote work to make it easier to care for children or elderly parents. Dozens of large corporations have also implemented "no overtime days", which require employees to leave the office promptly at 5:30 p.m. In 2007, Mitsubishi UFJ Trust & Banking, a division of Japan's largest banking group, started to allow employees to go home up to 3 hours early to care for children or elderly relatives. As of January 5, 2009, just 34 of the company's 7,000 employees had signed up for the plan.

In February 2017, the Japanese government launched a campaign called "Premium Friday" asking companies to allow their workers to leave at 3pm on the last Friday of the month. The initiative is part of an attempt to address the punishingly long hours many Japanese are expected to work, prompted by the suicide of a 24-year-old employee at the advertising firm Dentsu who was doing more than 100 hours' overtime in the months before her death. While some major companies, such as Honda, the drink maker Suntory and the confectioner Morinaga & Company, have adopted the optional scheme, others are less enthusiastic about the prospect of a mid-afternoon staff exodus. A survey of 155 big companies by the Nikkei business newspaper showed that 45% had no immediate plans to implement the scheme, with 37% saying they had either decided to enter into the spirit of Premium Friday or had plans to do so.

== Media attention ==
The French-German TV channel Arte showed a documentary titled Alt in Japan (literal translation: "Old in Japan") on 6 November 2006 dealing with older workers in Japan. In 2008, karoshi again made headlines: a death back in 2006 of a key Toyota engineer who averaged over 80 hours overtime each month was ruled the result of overwork. His family was awarded benefits after his case was reviewed.

Taiwanese media have reported a case of karoshi. An engineer had worked for Nanya Technology for 3 years from 2006 to 2009. It was found that he died in front of his computer surrounded by company documents. The prosecution found that the engineer had died of cardiogenic shock. The engineer's parents said that he worked for 16–19 hours a day. CNN shows another reported case of karoshi in Taiwan. This short clip called "The Dangers of Overwork" shows a man who suffered a stroke and was left for three hours before being taken to the hospital. It was made known that physicians are starting to make people more aware of these health deficits due to overwork. More people have been visiting their doctor, recognizing signs and symptoms of overwork.

== In other countries ==
Karoshi

Chinese name
- Traditional Chinese: 過勞死
- Simplified Chinese: 过劳死
Transcriptions
Standard Mandarin
- Hanyu Pinyin: guòláosǐ
- Bopomofo: ㄍㄨㄛˋ ㄌㄠˊ ㄙˇ
Yue: Cantonese
- Jyutping: gwo3 lou4 sei2

Korean name
- Hangul: 과로사
- Hanja: 過勞死
Transcriptions
- Revised Romanization: gwarosa
- McCune–Reischauer: kwarosa

Japanese name
- Kanji: 過労死
- Kana: かろうし
Transcriptions
- Romanization: karōshi
- Nihon-shiki: karôsi

The phenomenon of death by overwork is also widespread in other parts of Asia. 745,194 deaths worldwide were attributable to long working hours in 2016, based on WHO/ILO data.

=== China ===
In China, the analogous "death by overwork" concept is guolaosi (simplified Chinese: 过劳死; traditional Chinese: 過勞死), which in 2014 was reported to be a problem in the country. In Eastern Asian countries, like China, many businessmen work long hours and then feel the pressures of expanding and pleasing their networks. Making these connections is called building guanxi. Connections are a big part of the Chinese business world, and throughout different parts of China, businessmen would meet up in teahouses to take their job outside of the work atmosphere. It was important for businessmen to broaden their guanxi relationships, especially with powerful officials or bosses.

There is a lot of pressure to go to these nightclubs almost every night to drink heavily to move up in the business world. It has been shown that this kind of work could lead to health related problems down the line. For example, a businessman named Mr. Pan discussed with John Osburg, an anthropologist who wrote "Anxious Wealth: Money and Morality Among China's New Rich," about his health and the need to continue working. Mr. Pan, the 'biggest boss in Chengdu,' was in the hospital for 'excessive drinking.' This has happened to him before. Mr. Pan said, "I can't stop or slow down. I have many people whose livelihoods depend on me (literally 'depend on me to eat'). I've got about fifty employees and even more brothers. Their livelihoods depend on my success. I have to keep going."

A 2012 report by Legal Daily found the leading cause of line of duty deaths among police officers was exhaustion related heart attacks, followed by traffic accidents.

=== India ===
Indian labour law has, in theory, offered protection to labour rights. However, the average office worker, women and the IT sector are unofficially forced to work overtime without overtime pay. In 2023, Narayana Murthy, co-founder and former CEO of Infosys, called out the seemingly low productivity of Indian employees and said, "My request is that our youngsters must say – 'This is my country. I want to work 70 hours a week'. This is exactly what the Germans and Japanese did after the Second World War". This sparked a national debate with many male CEOs strongly supporting 70-hour workweeks to boost productivity and cover losses due to the COVID-19 pandemic. A 70-hour workweek translates to working approximately 12 hours a day, for six days a week, a phenomenon unofficially occurring in the IT industry. The death of Anna Sebastian Perayil, a 26-year-old chartered accountant, in July 2024, four months after starting work at the Pune EY branch, due to alleged pressure and anxiety caused by overwork, led to nationwide outrage and debate on toxic work culture in India.

=== South Korea ===
In South Korea, the term gwarosa (Korean: 과로사; Hanja: 過勞死; alternatively romanised as kwarosa) is also used to refer to death by overworking. South Korea has some of the longest working hours in the world, even more so than Japan with the average being 42. This has caused many workers to feel the pressure of their jobs which has taken a toll on both their physical and mental health. Many have died from being overworked and the issue has only begun to gain more national attention due to many government workers having died from gwarosa. In 2018, the South Korean government enacted a law cutting working hours from 68 to 52.

=== Sweden ===
In Sweden, the rate of deaths due to excessive stress at work is expected to increase in the future. A 2019 study, conducted with researchers in cooperation with The Swedish Work Environment Authority, concluded that 720 workers in Sweden already die every year due to stress from engaging in wage labour. This study sparked an increased amount of public debate.

== See also ==
Japan:

- Japanese management culture
- Japanese work environment
- Black company (Japan)
- Suicide in Japan
- Japanese labour law

General:

- Critique of work
- Eight-hour day
- Four-day workweek
- Occupational burnout
- Occupational stress
- Right to rest and leisure
- Stress (biological)
- Suicide crisis
- Workaholic
