= Machine orders =

Japanese economic indicator

Machine orders data (also known as machine tool order data) is a figure issued by Japan Machine Tool Builders Association (JMTBA) every month. It serves as one indicator of the Japanese economy. In the forex market, the release of such data is often followed by sharp change in currency exchange rate.
