= Slow journalism =

News subculture

Slow journalism is a news subculture borne out of the frustration at the quality of journalism from the mainstream press. A continuation from the larger slow movement, slow journalism shares the same values as other slow-movement subsets in its efforts to produce a good product. The principles of slow journalism can be distinguished by the content, the working processes, or the specific relationships with its audience, all of which follow the core mindset of social responsibility of the outlet and less so on profit. Slow journalism shares similarities and has been associated with forms of journalism like long-form journalism, literary journalism, narrative journalism, and new journalism. Researchers have noted that the concept is vague and not easily definable. Specialist titles have emerged around the world and proclaim to be antidotes to a mainstream media that is "filled to the brim with reprinted press releases, kneejerk punditry, advertorial nonsense and 'churnalism'". Slow journalism tends to focus on long reports and in-depth investigations. Megan Le Masurier associates the movement with a push for transparency, as it strives to be clear about how information is obtained by crediting all sources and clarifying what content is original and what is reproduced.

In 2007, academic and former journalist Susan Greenberg gave the name slow journalism to describe storytelling that gives equal value to narrative craft and factual discovery, taking "time to find things out, notice stories that others miss, and communicate it all to the highest standards". This article, published in the UK monthly magazine Prospect on 25 February 2007, was later cited as the original source for the term in the Oxford Dictionary of Journalism. In 2011, Peter Laufer wrote Slow News: A Manifesto for the Critical News Consumer, published by Oregon State University Press.

In August 2018, Jennifer Rauch, educator and researcher focusing on alternative media, media activism and popular culture, wrote the book Slow Media: Why Slow is Satisfying, Sustainable & Smart, published by Oxford University Press. In March 2019, Daniele Nalbone, an Italian journalist, and Alberto Puliafito, an Italian journalist, writer, director, and editor in chief of the Italian digital newspaper Slow News, wrote the book Slow Journalism – Chi ha ucciso il giornalismo?, published by Fandango Libri. In March 2020, Puliafito directed the documentary Slow News, produced by Fulvio Nebbia and internationally distributed by Java Films.

== Slow journalism titles ==
- Nudo Media, Spain
- 24h01, Belgium
- Alternativas Económicas, Spain
- De Correspondent, the Netherlands
- Delayed Gratification, UK
- Jot Down, Spain
- ProPublica, US
- Le Monde diplomatique, France
- Mother Jones, US
- The Probe, India
- Slow News, Italy
- Tortoise, UK
- UnHerd, UK
- Zetland, Denmark
- Edasi and Levila, Estonia
- Sept.info, Switzerland
- Jom, Singapore

== See also ==
- Slow living
- Slow media
- Slow reading
