= Slow media =

Decelerating media consumption and media production

Slow media is a movement focusing on the pace of media production and consumption in the digital age. It advocates for alternative ways of making and using media that are more intentional, more enjoyable, longer lasting, better researched/written/designed, more ethical, and of higher quality overall.

Slow Media developed in response to complex media formats and instant communication methods characteristic of digital culture, in which "high volumes of information are updated in real-time and are perpetually at your fingertips." Supporters of Slow Media criticize the spheres in which media is produced, shared, and consumed for valuing immediacy and dramatic presentation, in order to attract attention and maximize audiences, over the substance and credibility of a work.

== Related terms ==
Slow Media is a branch of the Slow movement, also known as Slow Living. Slow Media is closely related to the Slow Blogging, Slow Books, Slow Communication, Slow Journalism, Slow News, Slow Reading, and Slow television (Slow TV) movements, and sometimes used as a term encompassing all of these aspects.

== Philosophy and practices ==
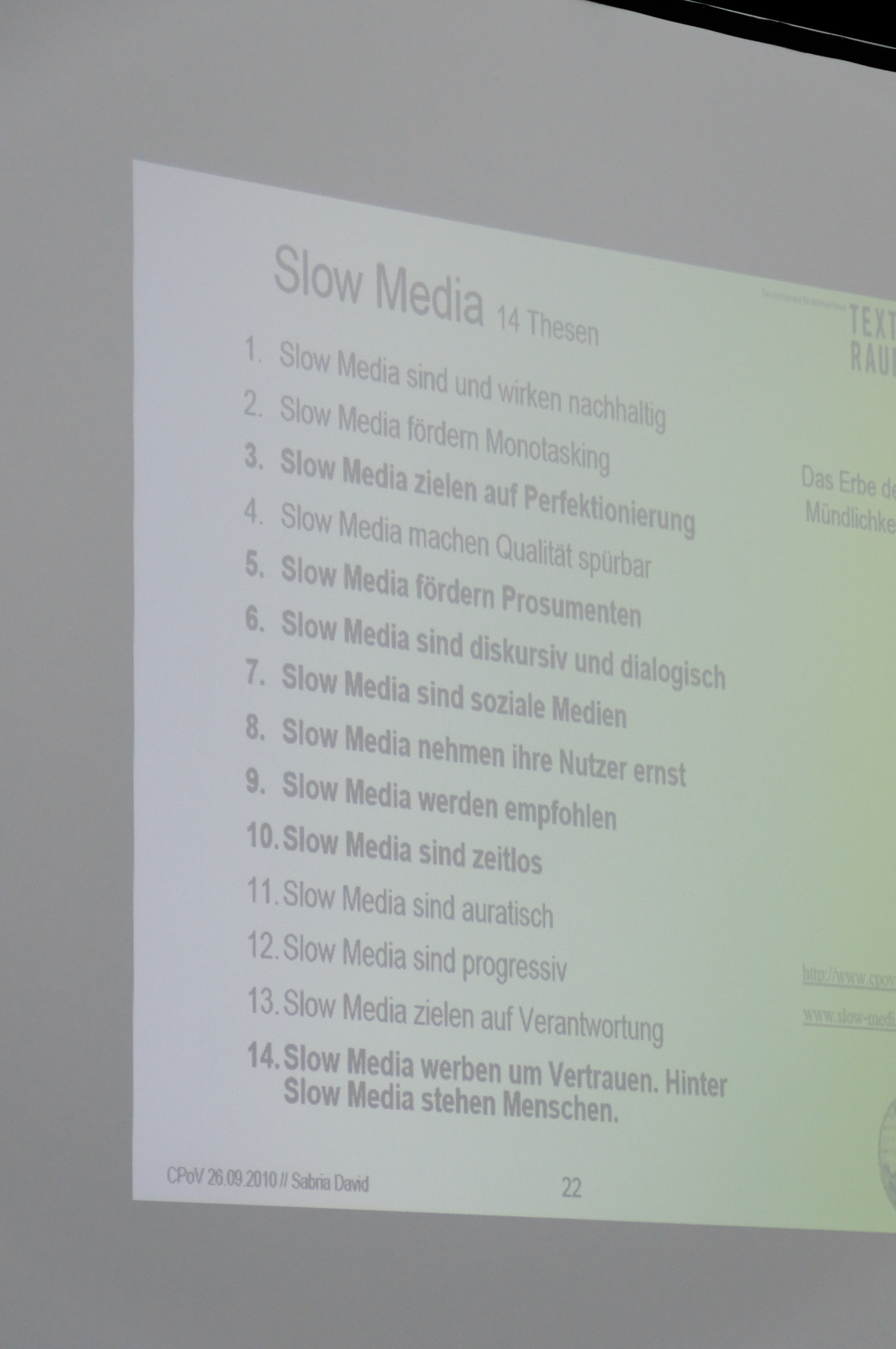
Slow Media Manifesto as presented at a conference in Leipzig (2010)

The term "slow media" was spontaneously coined in many places by many people circa 2002-2009. Writers, reporters, filmmakers and commentators (including Arianna Huffington) promoted the concept of Slow Media in publications like The Atlantic, Forbes, Grantmakers in the Arts, Huffington Post, The Times of London, Prospect, Rocky Mountain News, The Wall Street Journal, The Washington Post, as well as in Facebook groups, a wide array of blogs, and elsewhere.

Slow Media proponents take Slow Food as their model. "Like Slow Food, Slow Media are not about fast consumption but about choosing the ingredients mindfully and preparing them in a concentrated manner," wrote Benedikt Köhler, Sabria David and Jörg Blumtritt in the widely circulated "Slow Media Manifesto." They said that Slow Media are not a rejection of speed and simultaneity in digital media but rather "an attitude and a way of making use them." According to this manifesto, "It is because of the acceleration of multiple areas of life, that islands of deliberate slowness are made possible and essential for survival."

Documentarist Gregory Coyes, taking inspiration from "indigenous sense of cinematic time and space", has promoted the concept of slow media for video production as means to "decolonize" media. To this end the Slow Media Community website provides guidance for creating content as well as hosts a library of still-frame, long-form videos focusing on the "real time of nature", and human culture.

== See also ==
- Attention economy
- Slow journalism
- Slow living
- Slow movement
- Slow Reading
- Slow television (slow TV)
