= Thrifty =

Thrifty may refer to:

- Thrifty Foods, a Canadian supermarket chain
- Thrifty Drug Stores and Thrifty PayLess, now Rite Aid
- Thrifty phenotype
- Thrifty Rent A Car, part of Hertz Global Holdings
- Thrifty's, former name of Bluenotes, a Canadian clothing retailer

== See also ==
- Affluenza
- Anti-consumerism
- Conspicuous consumption
- Downshifting (lifestyle)
- Frugality
- Mottainai
- Over-consumption
- Simple living
- Thrift (disambiguation)
- Thrift shop
