= Downshift =

Downshift or downshifting may refer to:

- The shift of a vehicle transmission into a lower gear.
- Downshift, the name of three fictional characters in the Transformers universes.
- Downshifting (lifestyle), the social practice of adopting a simpler life

== See also ==
- Down-shift operator, in mathematics
