= Thrift =

Thrift may refer to:

- Frugality
- Thrift shop or charity shop
- A savings and loan association in the United States
- Apache Thrift, a remote procedure call (RPC) framework
- Thrift (plant), a plant in the genus Armeria
- Syd Thrift (1929–2006), American baseball executive

== See also ==
- Thrifty (disambiguation)
- Affluenza
- Anti-consumerism
- Conspicuous consumption
- Downshifting (lifestyle)
- Mottainai
- Over-consumption
- Simple living
