= Slow science =

Scientific branch of the slow movement

Slow science is part of the broader slow movement. It is based on the belief that science should be a slow, steady, methodical process, and that scientists should not be expected to provide "quick fixes" to society's problems. Slow science supports curiosity-driven scientific research and opposes performance targets. Slow science is a continually developing school of thought in the scientific community. Some journals have made slow science integral to their editorial policy. Followers of slow science practices are generally opposed to the current model of research which is seen as constrained by the need for continued funding. The slow science perspective attributes the overinflation of scientific publishing, and rise in fraudulent publishing with the requirement for researchers and institutions to create a justification for continued funding. The term slow science was first popularised in "Another Science is Possible: A Manifesto for Slow Science" by researcher Isabelle Stengers in 2018. The idea of "publish or perish", which too links limitations in the quality of research to financial constraints, has been around since the early 20th century. The slow science philosophy has been described as both a way to approach scientific research, and a science led movement which acts as a critique of science's function in neoliberal society.

Slow science has developed its key principles through the contribution of many scholars and organisations. Key principles include calls to shift from scientific research which places its value in output of research, research funding reform, and ridding scientific research from coerced political agendas. For especially well known scientists, some have had the freedom to apply slow science principles. Slow Science development has especially gained prevalence in western European scientific communities, in progressive research universities. Slow science as a whole has gradually gained support through individuals and organisational advocacy. Criticism, due to the movement's relatively small impact, has been limited.

== Development ==
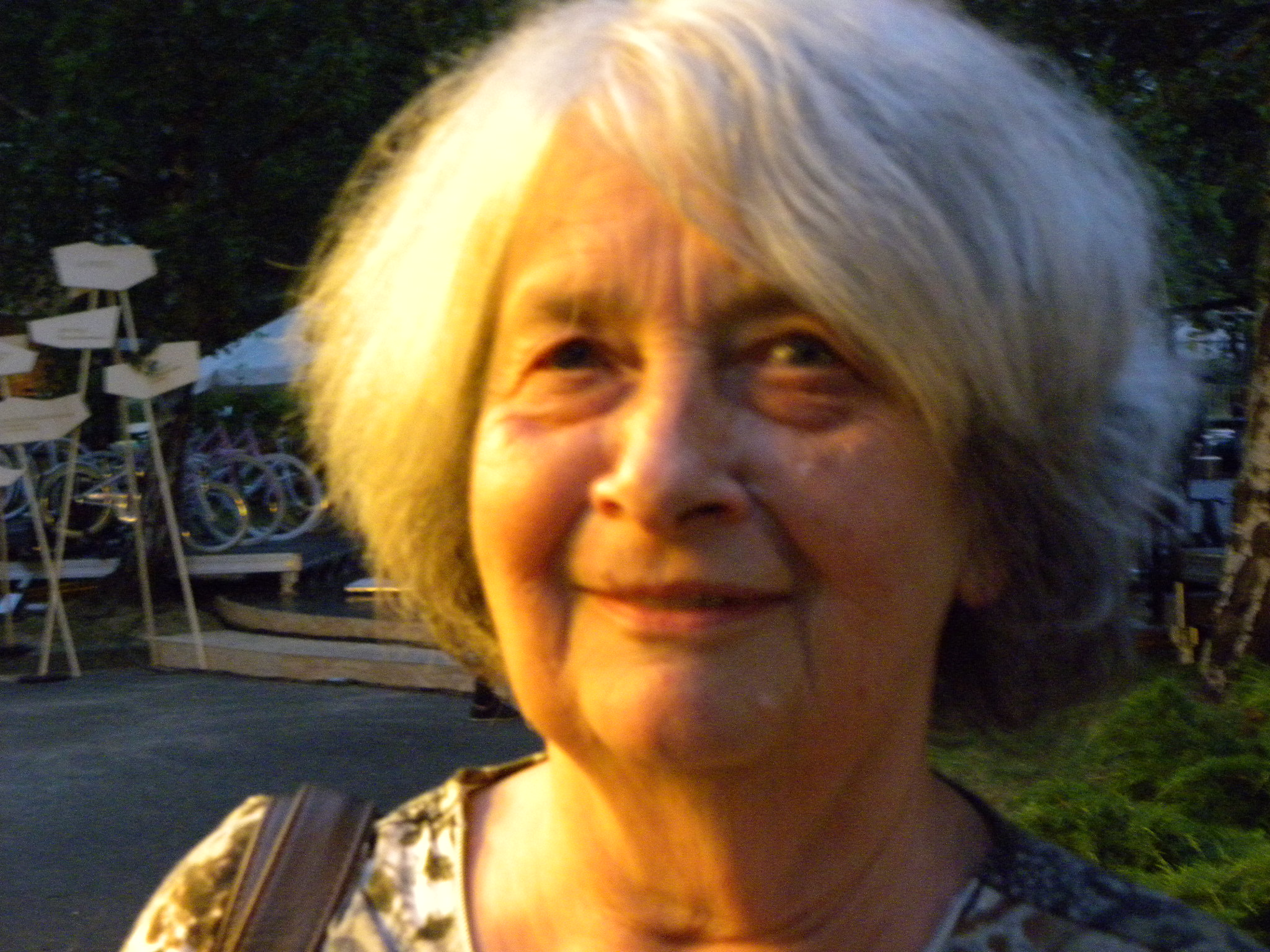
Isabelle Stengers, Belgian philosopher key to advancing slow scientific practice

The development of slow science is traced back to "publish or perish", first noted by Clarence Marsh Case in 1923. Slow science is a reaction against and critique of publish or perish. Slow science contributions have narrowed down the publish or perish culture into the scientific field. Slow science attributes many of its key principles to publish or perish, and is considered to be the way in which scientists can support a movement for change. Since the rise in prevalence of the term slow science in the 21st century, the two terms have been used as opposites by academics and journalists alike.

Early contributions to the development of slow science came from research universities across western Europe. Before the development of slow science, was the popularisation in university spheres of the term fast science. This was most notable by Dr Joel Candau in 2010, in his open letter to the University of Nice, in which he stated "Fast science, like fast food, favours quantity over quality,". In 2010 Ruth Muller had coined the term slow science, whilst in her position at the AIIA, helping develop a slow science international network. Most significant in its early development, was the publication of the article "the Slow Science Manifesto" in 2011 by a group of German scholars known as the slow science academy. This manifesto was the first time the slow science had reached a non academic audience.

Most notably however, was the popularisation of the term slow science in 2018. The publication "Another Science is Possible: A Manifesto for Slow Science" by Isabelle Stengers, is the first book published on the topic of slow science. During this period, there was an increase in media activity surrounding slow science, which helped grow collaboration with other slow movements, such as slow fashion. Isabelle Stengers' contribution was significant as a scholar who could attract media beyond academic spheres. Notability increased as a result of globally recognised psychologist Uta Frith's journal article on slow science. Since the start of the COVID-19 pandemic, publications on slow science have been limited.

== Key principles ==
The key principles of slow science are based on the premise that the most accurate and thorough scientific research is results from absence of financial constraint, absence of an immediate deadline, and no directive from market based influences. The key principles of slow science are a critique of modern scientific funding, and advocate for public knowledge, and changed practices in scientific research.

=== Slow scientific practice ===
At the core of the slow science agenda is the desire to shift from scientific research which places its value in output of research, to research which is for the benefit of the public. Slow science advocates for the adoption of slow scientific practices. An example of this is the support of increased cumulative scientific research, which as a collaboration of thorough scientific research, will be more effective in addressing great global issues. In adopting these values into scientific practice, slow science aims to reduce the stress on research by removing funding-linked performance outcomes. Slow scientific practices involve a methodical approach, published with a rigorous peer review system, that slow science researchers believe will be able to reduce fraudulent results and increase research which leads to innovation.

Slow scientific practice aims for quality of work over quantity of output. Therefore, there is a distinct opposition to the overinflating quality of academic research. Amongst the slow science community, phrases such as the "least publishable unit" and "publons", have been used to satirise the rise in peer-reviewed publications with minimal amounts of depth in its research. A theme within so slow science is a positive outlook on the prospects of scientific advancement, however a necessity to advocate for the publishing of high quality, peer-reviewed study.

=== Research funding reform ===
Slow Science proposes a change to the current structure of research funding, especially directed towards the increase in funding sourced from corporate donorship in academic institutions, as well as the rise in private independent research institutes. The slow science movement has called for all government funded research to be for the benefit of broader society, and has also called for an overall system of funding reform. Slow science groups, such as Slow Science Belgium, have called for increased government funding to be a necessity, and for key performance indicator linked targets for results to be removed from grant conditions. Key contributor to the slow science Uta Frith has expressed the idea that as government funding increases, so will risk taking in research, and therefore lead to the potential of greater scientific innovation.

=== Apolitical driven research ===
Apolitical research, from a slow science perspective, opposes research which aims to show alternatives to scientific precedent for political benefits. As well as this, the slow science movement extends this to what is described as an inherently political shift in the privatisation of knowledge, that is, scientific research which has moved from publications to private research and development of products. Slow Science believes in ending prolonged research for the benefit of governments, on issues such as resource depletion, global warming and urban overdevelopment, as to doubt scientific consensus for policy benefits. The slow science movement perceives financial pressures from governments or corporations as forms of suppression of broad research, and believes in an inherent link between funding and scientific agenda. Hence, slow scientific practice is inherently a political struggle, to remove political and ideological constraints in research.

== In scientific research ==
=== Environmental research ===
Subscribers to slow science principles consider environmental research to be a field of research which has become continually scrutinised by policy makers who search for cost effective and convenient solutions to climate change. Slow science aims to protect climate research through what is considered the separation of scientific judgement from the judgement of social and political issues. Slow scientists advocate for the removal of climatology from the influence of the speculative economy, and the undermining of research by policy makers who control scientific funding. The slow science approach to environmental research is one which is inherently a critique of capitalism, and one which considers current constraints in funding leading to scientists promoting "best possible" outcomes in reporting of climate.

=== Clinical research ===
The application of slow science principles are especially dedicated to changes in clinical research as a whole. German psychologist Uta Frith describes her breakthrough 1980's research into the link between dyslexia and phonological processing as one which had the freedom to make errors, and run numerous trials. Uta Firth in her criticism of "Fast Science", identifies the possible future of clinical research does not allow for numerous and large trials to identify potential errors in trials. For slow science, the rise in "convenience sampling" by academic institutions who provide researchers with pools of students is a cost cutting method which skews the results of data by not producing a diverse sample. Clinical research, from a slow science perspective, should be removed from significant financial constraints which potentially lead to unreliable or fraudulent data.

=== Interdisciplinary Study ===
In collaborative study, slow scientists aim for longer periods spent in interdisciplinary studies. Key to this are learning cycles, which aim to provide an understanding of how other fields create rationale for results gained. As well as this, some slow scientists have attributed collaborative success to ethical models, such as ethics of care. These can include general guides to considerate collaboration, or direct models such as Trontos's ethical framework. Slow scientists believe financial constraints rush scientific research, and this creates an overspecialization of researchers. By taking on long term collaborative projects, slow scientists believe greater global issues can be tackled.

== Reception ==
Slow science has been met with some support from the scientific community, through both individuals and community groups. Two of the most notable slow science activists are researcher Isabelle Stengers, and world recognised developmental psychologist Uta Frith. Both have contributed through publications, with the key work of the Slow Science movement; with publications "Another Science is Possible: A Manifesto for Slow Science" and "Fast Lane to Slow Science", being introductory perspectives into the slow science movement.

In 2010, anthropologist Dr. Joël Candau wrote an appeal to the University of Nice against fast science principles, and received 4000 signatories by scientists. The unexpected support from this open letter indicated a rise in the popularity of the term "fast science", and the beginning of an evident support base.

Whilst individual publications have been credited towards providing research methods used through a slow science lens, Slow Scientific organisations have developed to act as a union of scientists who advocate for funding reform in scientific research. The German "Slow Science Academy", and "Slow Science Belgium", are organisations of scientists which advocate and practise slow science principles in their research.

The slow science movement, due to its only recent notability, has limited direct criticism from university administrators. However, arguments developed by especially university administrations have promoted financial and time constraints as a way to increase positive pressure on academic research. Research institutions also expect researchers to accept certain terms of constraint as to promote professionalism, and drive focused innovation. The most prevalent disagreement between slow science advocates and university administration is on the basis of tenure. University administrations have opposed criticism to advocates for tenureship, as a broader scope of casual academics who can produce a higher amount of "deliverables" for the same amount of funding.

== See also ==
- "Publish or perish"
