= Cucurella =

Cucurella is a Catalan surname. Notable people with the surname include:

- Ana E. Cucurella-Adorno, Puerto Rican academic
- Marc Cucurella (born 1998), Spanish footballer
- Margarita Boladeras i Cucurella (born 1945), Spanish philosopher and academic
