= Academic careerism =

Tendency of academics to put career over truth

Academic careerism is the tendency of academics (professors specifically and intellectuals generally) to pursue their own enrichment and self-advancement at the expense of honest inquiry, unbiased research and dissemination of truth to their students and society. Such careerism has been criticized by thinkers from Socrates in ancient Athens to Russell Jacoby in the present.

== Socrates' criticism of the Sophists ==
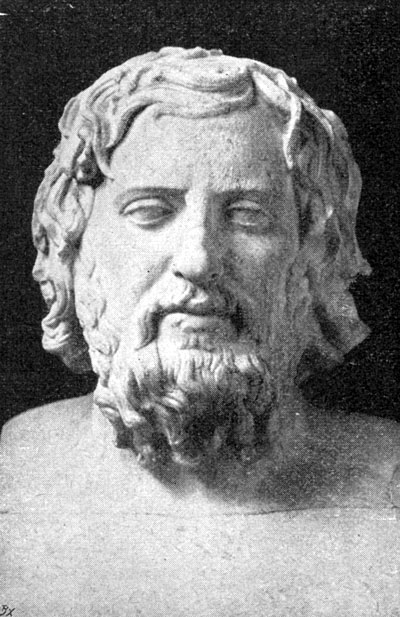
Xenophon

In Xenophon's Memorabilia, Socrates draws a comparison between the proper and honorable way to bestow beauty and the proper and honorable way to bestow wisdom. Those who offer beauty for sale on the market are called prostitutes, and are held in disrepute by the Athenians. Those who offer wisdom for sale, on the other hand, are highly respected. Socrates believes this is an error. The Sophists should be seen for what they are, prostitutors of wisdom.

When we see a woman bartering beauty for gold, we look upon such a one as no other than a common prostitute; but she who rewards the passion of some worthy youth with it, gains at the same time our approbation and esteem. It is the very same with philosophy: he who sets it forth for public sale, to be disposed of to the highest bidder, is a sophist, a public prostitute.

In Plato's Protagoras, Socrates draws an analogy between peddlers of unhealthy food and peddlers of false and deceptive wisdom. Food peddlers advertise their wares as healthy without offering solid evidence to back up their claims, leading those who trust them to succumb to an unhealthy diet. Peddlers of knowledge try to persuade impressionable young minds that what they teach is salutary and true, again without offering solid arguments to back up their claims. They mislead young minds on paths not conducive to intellectual flourishing.

Knowledge is the food of the soul; and we must take care, my friend, that the Sophist does not deceive us when he praises what he sells, like the dealers wholesale or retail who sell the food of the body; for they praise indiscriminately all their goods, without knowing what are really beneficial or hurtful.

== Schopenhauer's criticism of university philosophy ==
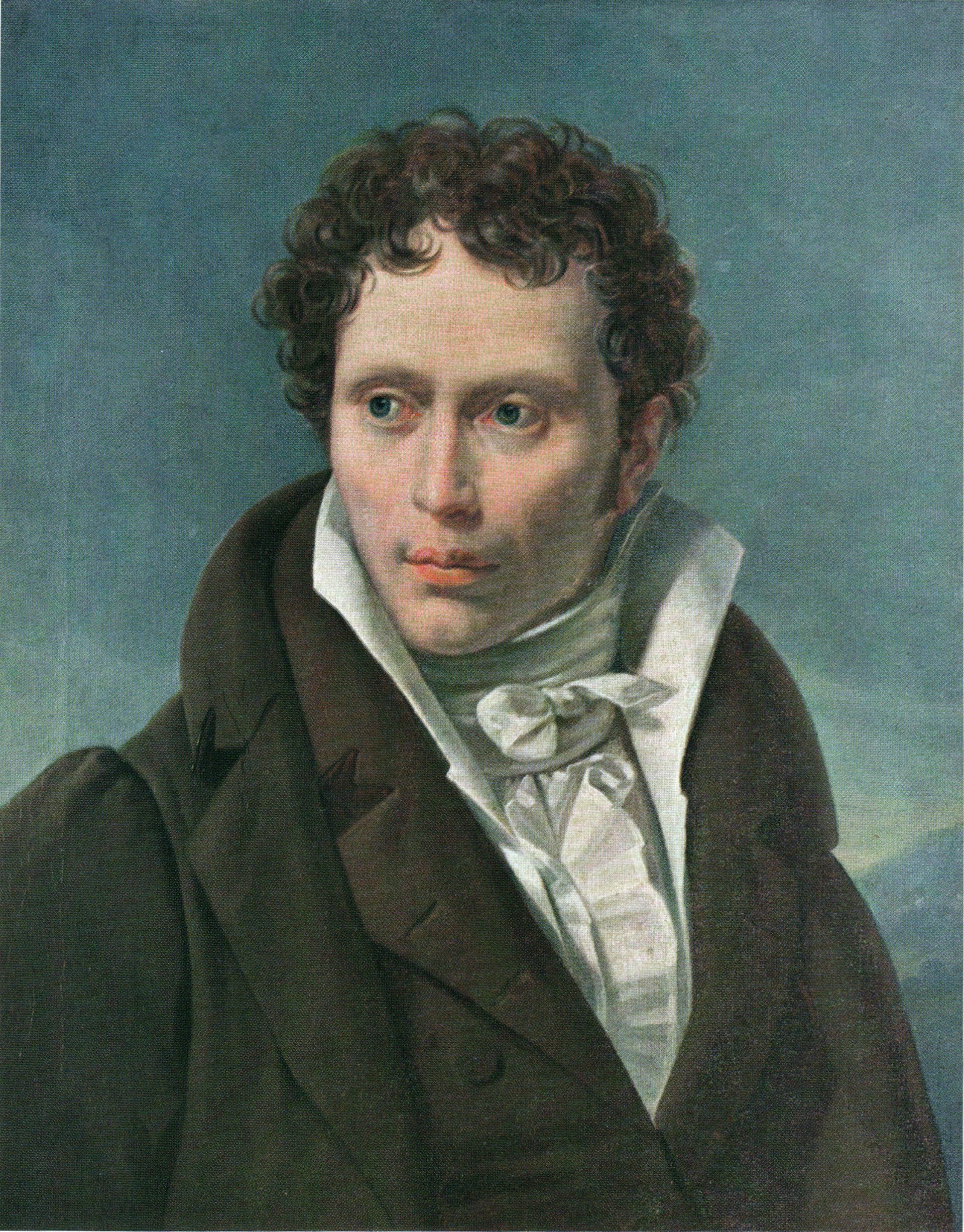
Arthur Schopenhauer

Nineteenth-century German philosopher Arthur Schopenhauer contrasts the genuine philosopher, who earnestly pursues truth and offers its fruits to all who will listen, to the "businessmen of the chair", the academics of his day who have debased the pursuit of knowledge into a means of livelihood no more dignified than the practice of business or law. The motto of the academic opportunists is "primum vivere deinde philosophari"—first live, afterwards philosophize. The bourgeois sentiment that someone who earns his living by profession must know something about it makes those who hold the academic chairs immune from criticism. They make their living from philosophy, the public reasons, so they must know philosophy. The philosophy taught in the universities, Schopenhauer claims, is really no more than a superficial rationalization for the institutionalized religion, the intentions of the government, and the prevailing views of the times.

We should judge university philosophy ... by its true and proper aim: ... that the junior barristers, solicitors, doctors, probationers, and pedagogues of the future should maintain, even in their innermost conviction, the same line of thought in keeping with the aims and intentions that the State.

== Julien Benda's Treason of the Intellectuals ==
French scholar Julien Benda (1867–1956) observes that in the past intellectuals have adopted two poses toward politics. The first was Plato's doctrine that morality must decide politics. The second was Machiavelli's, which said that politics has nothing to do with morality. Benda accuses the generation of intellectuals influential in France in the 1920s of adopting a third, far more pernicious, pose: that politics must be allowed to decide morality. The cause of this "divinizing of politics" is that the intellectuals (French clercs) of his era have abandoned the ideal of disinterestedness, and now consider themselves to be ordinary citizens, subject to the same incentives as ordinary citizens.

The true clerc is Vauvenargues, Lamarck, Fresnel, Spinoza, Schiller, Baudelaire, César Franck, who were never diverted from single-hearted adoration of the beautiful and the divine by the necessity of earning their daily bread. But such clercs are inevitably rare. ... The rule is that the living creature condemned to struggle for life turns to practical passions, and thence to the sanctifying of those passions.

The pursuit of personal advantage by purveying knowledge, Benda explains, has been held in disrepute since antiquity. But in his generation, this view of intellectual work has begun to seem obsolete, replaced by a kind of institutionalized careerism in which intellectuals were driven by the same petty desires for personal advantage as businessmen and lawyers.

Since the Greeks, the predominant attitude of thinkers towards intellectual activity was to glorify it insofar as (like aesthetic activity) it finds its satisfaction in itself, apart from any attention to the advantages it may procure. Most thinkers would have agreed with ... Renan's verdict that the man who loves science for its fruits commits the worst of blasphemies against that divinity. ... The modern clercs have violently torn up this charter. They proclaim the intellectual functions are only respectable to the extent that they are bound up with the pursuit of concrete advantage.

== Albert Einstein’s criticism of an academic career ==
Albert Einstein (1879 –1955) was a civil servant working in the Berne Swiss patent office (1902 – 1909). In 1905, a year sometimes described as his 'miracle year', Einstein published four groundbreaking papers. These outlined the theory of the photoelectric effect, explained Brownian motion, introduced special relativity, and demonstrated mass-energy equivalence. On his seventieth birthday Einstein wrote that in retrospect the formulation of patent statements had been a blessing. “It gave me the opportunity to think about physics. Moreover, a practical profession is a salvation for a man of my type: an academic career compels a young man to scientific production and only strong characters can resist the temptation of superficial analysis.”

== Russell Jacoby's criticisms of contemporary academia ==
Historian Russell Jacoby, writing in the 1970s, observes that intellectual production has succumbed to the same pattern of planned obsolescence used by manufacturing enterprises to generate renewed demand for their products.

The application of planned obsolescence to thought itself has the same merit as its application to consumer goods; the new is not only shoddier than the old, it fuels an obsolete social system that staves off its replacement by manufacturing the illusion that it is perpetually new.

Jacoby laments the demise of the radical critical theory of the previous generation, which sought to understand and articulate the contradictions inherent in bourgeois and liberal democratic ideologies. The new generation of theories, in contrast, seeks to allow the contradictory elements of the ideology to coexist by isolating them, assigning them to separate departments in the university. This division of intellectual labor in the service of the prevailing ideology, Jacoby says, "severs the life nerve of dialectical thought."

Jacoby ends his 1987 book The Last Intellectuals on a despairing note, observing that even radical Marxist intellectuals aren't immune to the pressure to achieve tenure, and have begun to alter their research methods in conformity to pressure from university administrators.

== Edward Said's description of the career of critical theory in the 1980s ==
Literature professor Edward Said, in his 1983 book The World, the Text, and the Critic, accuses literary theorists of his generation of succumbing to the free-market ideology of the Reagan era. The previous generation of critical theorists, Said explains, did not allow itself to be constrained by the conventional separation of academic fiefdoms. It maintained an insurrectionary relationship with the society in which it lived. The generation of critical theorists influential in the 1980s, however, began to betray these ideals, and timorously succumbed to the prevailing societal ethic of specialization and professionalism.

The intellectual origins of literary theory in Europe were, I think it is accurate to say, insurrectionary. The traditional university, the hegemony of determinism and positivism, the reification of ideological bourgeois "humanism," the rigid barriers between academic specialties: it was powerful responses to all these that linked together such influential progenitors of today's literary theorist as Saussure, Lukács, Bataille, Lévi-Strauss, Freud, Nietzsche, and Marx. Theory proposed itself as a synthesis overriding the petty fiefdoms within the world of intellectual production, and it was manifestly to be hoped as a result that all the domains of human activity could be seen, and lived, as a unity. … Literary theory, whether of the Left or the Right, has turned its back on these things. This can be considered, I think, the triumph of the ethic of professionalism. But it is no accident that the emergence of so narrowly defined a philosophy of pure textuality and critical noninterference has coincided with the ascendancy of Reaganism.

== Camille Paglia's characterization of the "junk bond" era in academia ==
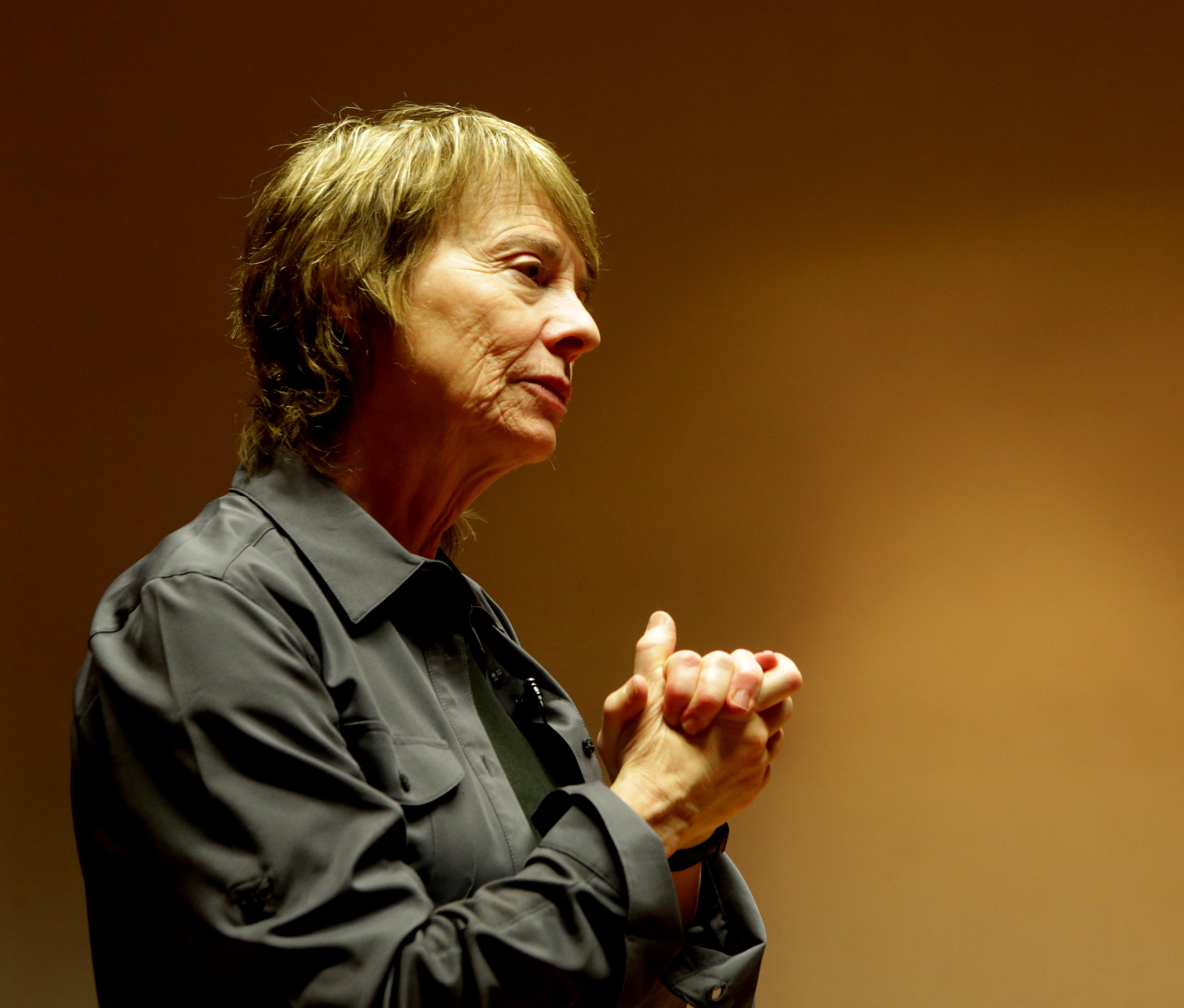
Camille Paglia

Writing in 1991, "dissident feminist" scholar Camille Paglia finds in David Halperin's work a prototypical example of rampant careerism in the humanities. Paglia observes that Halperin's generation of academics is prone to a "contemporary parochialism" that eagerly cites hot-off-the-press articles without attempting to critically assess their objective merit in light of the intellectual tradition. Paglia accuses Halperin of assembling a pastiche of the latest faddish opinions and marketing it as a book, not for the sake of advancing the cause of truth, but with no other aim than career advancement. She compares such scholarship to junk bonds, a highly volatile investment.

Never in my career have I seen a scholarly book of such naked worldly ambition, such lack of scruple about its methods or its claims to knowledge. It is exquisitely emblematic of its time.

Paglia characterizes contemporary academic discourse, influenced by French theorists such as Jacques Lacan, Jacques Derrida, and Michel Foucault, as the academic equivalent of name-brand consumerism. "Lacan, Derrida, and Foucault," she says, "are the academic equivalents of BMW, Rolex, and Cuisinart." Under the inspiration of the latest academic fashions, academics manufacture insipid prose with no objective merit for the same reason fashion designers come out with new fashions each season. Academics peddle the latest fashionable theories to replace perfectly good older theories, made obsolete not by genuine progress, but only by incessant changes in fashion, changes deliberately contrived to create consumer demand in a credulous public. The self-seeking of the latest generation of scholars is, for Paglia, symptomatic of an era iconically represented by junk bond traders on Wall Street, concerned not with creating a quality product, but only with making a quick buck. She takes Halperin's essay "Why is Diotima a Woman?" as an example, calling it "one of the great junk bonds of the fast-track academic era, whose unbridled greed for fame and power was intimately in sync with parallel developments on Wall Street".

As a remedy for rampant careerism in academia, Paglia prescribes a return to the ancient ascetic roots of the academic tradition.

Academe needs deprofessionalization and deyuppification. It has to recover its clerical or spiritual roots. Scholarship is an ideal and a calling, not merely a trade or living. Every year at commencement, we put on medieval robes that connect us to a great monastic past.

Paglia advises the graduate students of the next generation to return to the gentlemanly and ascetic traditions of past academics, avoiding faddish subjects or methods of interpretation, refusing to seek material reward from their work, and pursuing instead a lofty ideal of scholarship in which work follows "its own organic rhythm" rather than chasing the latest trends to win approval from contemporaries.

== See also ==
- Extreme careerism
- Forced ranking
- Least publishable unit
- Metascience
- Perverse incentive
- Publish or perish
- Research Integrity Risk Index
- Sociology of science
