= Downshifting (lifestyle) =

Adoption of simpler lifestyle

In social behavior, downshifting is a trend where individuals adopt simpler lives from what critics call the "rat race".

The long-term effect of downshifting can include an escape from what has been described as economic materialism, as well as reducing the "stress and psychological expense that may accompany economic materialism". This social trend emphasizes finding an improved balance between leisure and work, while also focusing life goals on personal fulfillment, as well as building personal relationships instead of the all-consuming pursuit of economic success.

Downshifting differs from simple living in its focus on moderate change and concentration on an individual comfort level and a gradual approach to living. In the 1990s, this form of simple living began appearing in the mainstream media, and has continually grown in popularity among populations living in industrial societies, especially the United States, the United Kingdom, New Zealand, and Australia, as well as Russia.

== Values and motives ==
"Down-shifters" refers to people who adopt long-term voluntary simplicity in their lives. A few of the main practices of down-shifters include accepting less money for fewer hours worked, while placing an emphasis on consuming less in order to reduce their ecological footprint. One of the main results of these practices is being able to enjoy more leisure time in the company of others, especially loved ones.

The primary motivations for downshifting are gaining leisure time, escaping from work-and-spend cycle, and removing the clutter of unnecessary possessions. The goal might be to achieve a holistic self-understanding and satisfying meaning in life.

Because of its personalized nature and emphasis on many minor changes, rather than complete lifestyle overhaul, downshifting attracts participants from across the socioeconomic spectrum. An intrinsic consequence of downshifting is increased time for non-work-related activities, which, combined with the diverse demographics of downshifters, cultivates higher levels of civic engagement and social interaction.

The scope of participation is limitless, because all members of society—adults, children, businesses, institutions, organizations, and governments—are able to downshift even if many demographic strata do not start "high" enough to "down"-shift.

In practice, down-shifting involves a variety of behavioral and lifestyle changes. The majority of these down-shifts are voluntary choices. Natural life course events, such as the loss of a job, or birth of a child can prompt involuntary down-shifting. There is also a temporal dimension, because a down-shift could be either temporary or permanent.

== Methods ==
=== Work and income ===
The most common form of down-shifting is work (or income) down-shifting. Down-shifting is fundamentally based on dissatisfaction with the conditions and consequences of the workplace environment. The philosophy of work-to-live replaces the social ideology of live-to-work. Reorienting economic priorities shifts the work–life balance away from the workplace.

Economically, work downshifts are defined in terms of reductions in either actual or potential income, work hours, and spending levels. Following a path of earnings that is lower than the established market path is a downshift in potential earnings in favor of gaining other non-material benefits.

On an individual level, work downshifting is a voluntary reduction in annual income. Downshifters desire meaning in life outside of work and, therefore, will opt to decrease the amount of time spent at work or work hours. Reducing the number of hours of work, consequently, lowers the amount earned. Simply not working overtime or taking a half-day a week for leisure time, are work downshifts.

Career downshifts are another way of downshifting economically and entail lowering previous aspirations of wealth, a promotion or higher social status. Quitting a job to work locally in the community, from home or to start a business are examples of career downshifts. Although more radical, these changes do not mean stopping work altogether.

Many reasons are cited by workers for this choice and usually center on a personal cost–benefit analysis of current working situations and desired extracurricular activities. High stress, pressure from employers to increase productivity, and long commutes can be factors that contribute to the costs of being employed. If the down-shifter wants more non-material benefits like leisure time, a healthy family life, or personal freedom then switching jobs could be a desirable option.

Work down-shifting may also be a key to considerable health benefits as well as a healthy retirement. People are retiring later in life than previous generations. As can be seen by looking at The Health and Retirement Study, done by the Health and Retirement Study Survey Research Center, women can show the long term health benefits of down-shifting their work lives by working part time hours over a long period of years. Men however prove to be more unhealthy if they work part time from middle age till retirement. Men who down-shift their work life to part time hours at the age of 60 to 65 however benefit from continuing to work a part-time job through a semi retirement even over the age of 70. This is an example of how flexible working policies can be a key to being healthy while in retirement.

=== Spending habits ===
Another aspect of down-shifting is being a conscious consumer or actively practicing alternative forms of consumption. Proponents of down-shifting point to consumerism as a primary source of stress and dissatisfaction because it creates a society of individualistic consumers who measure both social status and general happiness by an unattainable quantity of material possessions. Instead of buying goods for personal satisfaction, consumption down-shifting, purchasing only the necessities, is a way to focus on quality of life rather than quantity.

This realignment of spending priorities promotes the functional utility of goods over their ability to convey status which is evident in downshifters being generally less brand-conscious. These consumption habits also facilitate the option of working and earning less because annual spending is proportionally lower. Reducing spending is less demanding than more extreme downshifts in other areas, like employment, as it requires only minor lifestyle changes.

=== Policies that enable downshifting ===
Unions, business, and governments could implement more flexible working hours, part-time work, and other non-traditional work arrangements that enable people to work less, while still maintaining employment. Small business legislation, reduced filing requirements and reduced tax rates encourage small-scale individual entrepreneurship and therefore help individuals quit their jobs altogether and work for themselves on their own terms.

=== Environmental consequences ===
The catch-phrase of International Downshifting Week is "Slow Down and Green Up". Whether intentional or unintentional, generally, the choices and practices of down-shifters nurture environmental health because they reject the fast-paced lifestyle fueled by fossil fuels and adopt more sustainable lifestyles. The latent function of consumption down-shifting is to reduce, to some degree, the carbon footprint of the individual down-shifter. An example is to shift from a corporate suburban rat race lifestyle to a small eco friendly farming lifestyle.

=== Down-shifting geographically ===
Downshifting geographically is a relocation to a smaller, rural, or more slow-paced community. This is often a response to the hectic pace of life and stresses in urban areas. It is a significant change but does not bring total removal from mainstream culture.

== Sociopolitical implications ==
Although downshifting is primarily motivated by personal desire and not by a conscious political stance, it does define societal overconsumption as the source of much personal discontent. By redefining life satisfaction in non-material terms, downshifters assume an alternative lifestyle but continue to coexist in a society and political system preoccupied with the economy. In general, downshifters are politically apathetic because mainstream politicians mobilize voters by proposing governmental solutions to periods of financial hardship and economic recessions. This economic rhetoric is meaningless to downshifters who have forgone worrying about money.

In the United States, the UK, and Australia, a significant minority, approximately 20 to 25 percent, of these countries' citizens identify themselves in some respect as downshifters. Downshifting is not an isolated or unusual choice. Politics still centers around consumerism and unrestricted growth, but downshifting values, such as family priorities and workplace regulation, appear in political debates and campaigns.

Like downshifters, the Cultural Creatives is another social movement whose ideology and practices diverge from mainstream consumerism and according to Paul Ray, are followed by at least a quarter of U.S. citizens.

In his book In Praise of Slowness, Carl Honoré relates followers of downshifting and simple living to the global slow movement.

The significant number and diversity of downshifters are a challenge to economic approaches to improving society. The rise in popularity of downshifting and similar, post-materialist ideologies represents unorganized social movements without political aspirations or motivating grievances. This is a result of their grassroots nature and relatively inconspicuous, non-confrontational subcultures.

== See also ==
- Anti-consumerism
- Conspicuous consumption
- Degrowth
- Demotion
- Downsizing
- Eco-communalism
- Ecological economics
- Ecovillage
- Ethical consumerism
- FIRE movement
- Frugality
- Homesteading
- Intentional community
- Intentional living
- Minimalism / Simple living
- Permaculture
- Sleep tourism
- Slow living
- Sustainable living
- Tang ping
- Transition towns
- Workaholic
