= Yoga tourism =

Travel with the purpose of experiencing yoga

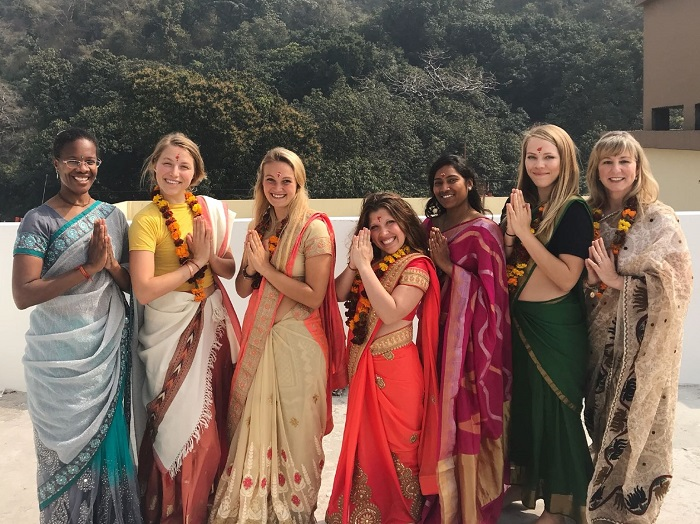
Some yoga tourists travel to India to become certified yoga teachers, like these participants in a 200-hour Ashtanga yoga teacher training in Rishikesh.

Yoga tourism is travel with the specific purpose of experiencing some form of yoga, whether spiritual or postural. The former is a type of spiritual tourism; the latter is related both to spiritual and to wellness tourism. Yoga tourists often visit ashrams in India to study yoga or to be trained and certified as yoga teachers. Major centres for yoga tourism include Rishikesh and Mysore.

While the Himalayas is the birthplace of yoga and a major yoga tourism destination, yoga retreats and holidays are provided in many countries, varying from simple stays in guesthouses and ashrams to 5-star comfort in luxury resorts.

== Wellness tourism and spiritual tourism ==
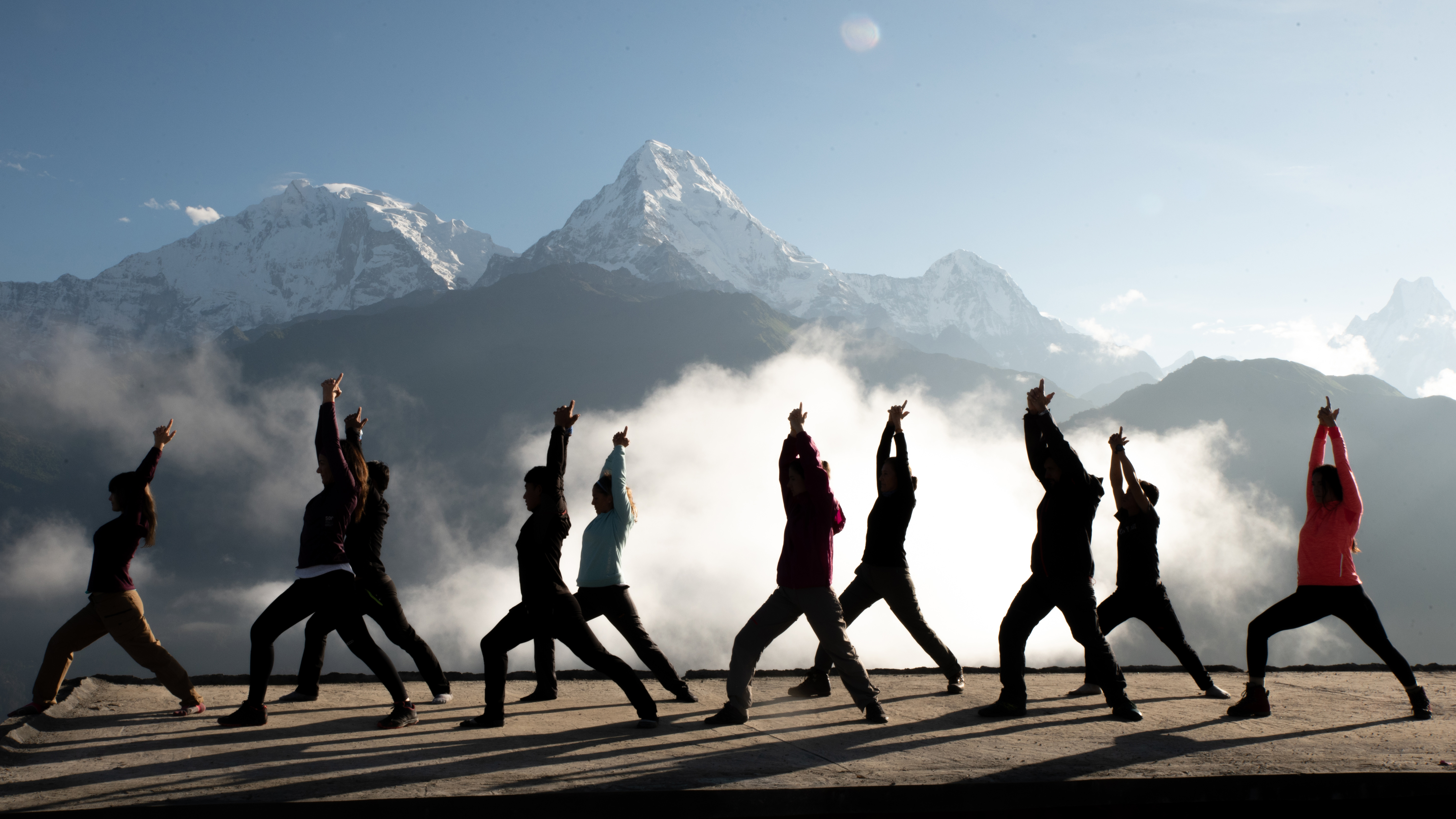
Tourists practising Virabhadrasana I in Poon Hill, Nepal

Yoga is an ancient spiritual practice. From this perspective, yoga tourism can be seen as a form of spiritual tourism, involving the embracing and commodification of that practice by the Western world. There is a tension between the purely spiritual and transformational goals of yoga, meaning union with an entity higher than the self, and the commercialisation inherent in mass tourism, and in the yoga industry more generally.

Especially when considering yoga as exercise, yoga tourism is seen by some scholars of tourism as a form of wellness tourism, in which people choose to go on a journey to further their health and well-being. In this context, yoga is taken to deliver physical benefits such as strength, flexibility, and relief from back pain, and mental benefits such as reduction of stress. More specifically, when seen as a form of wellness tourism, it is defined as "tourism which focuses on the union of body, mind and spirit, but which is essentially areligious".

A study of the global yoga tourism market estimated its value at $181 billion in 2022, and projected that this would grow to $319 billion by 2032.

== India ==
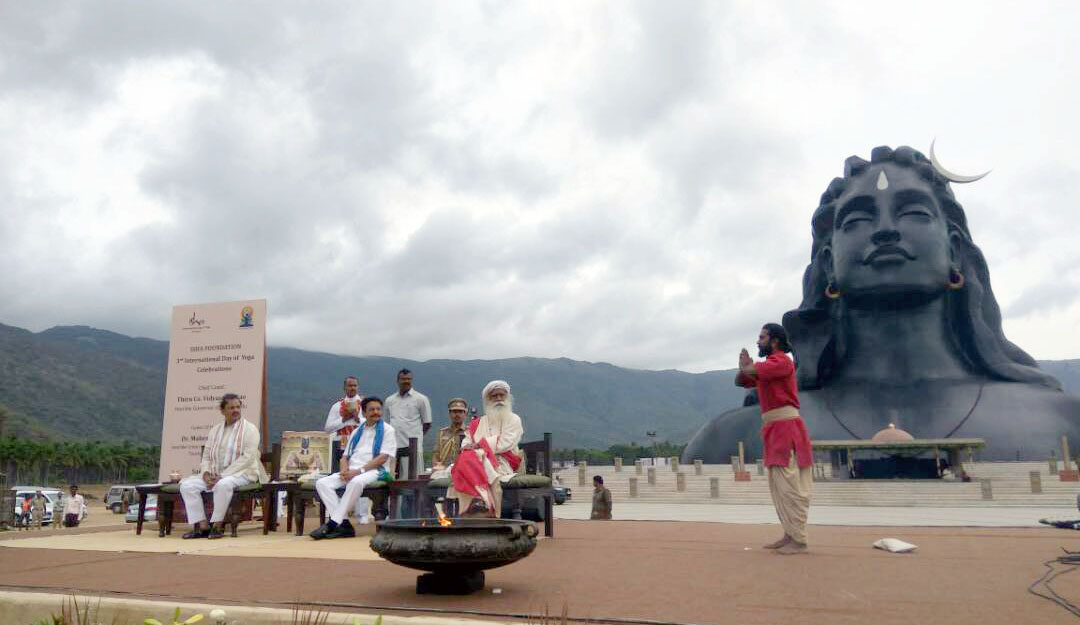
The governor of Tamil Nadu state, the Indian minister of tourism, and the yoga guru Jaggi Vasudev promoting yoga in India on the 3rd International Day of Yoga in 2017 at the Isha Foundation, Coimbatore. A large statue of the god Shiva as Adiyogi (the first yogi) is in the background.

India has become a major destination for yoga tourism. In 1968, the English rock band the Beatles travelled to Rishikesh to take part in a Transcendental Meditation training course at Maharishi Mahesh Yogi's ashram, a Hindu monastery. The visit sparked widespread Western interest in Indian spirituality, and has led many Westerners to travel to India hoping to find "authentic" yoga in ashrams in places such as Rishikesh. That movement led in turn to the creation of many yoga schools offering teacher training and promotion of India as a "yoga tourism hub" by the Indian Ministry of Tourism and the Ministry of AYUSH. In 2014, India's Prime Minister Narendra Modi, addressing the United Nations, announced an annual Day of Yoga on 21 June. This was adopted as the International Day of Yoga by the United Nations.

== Other venues ==
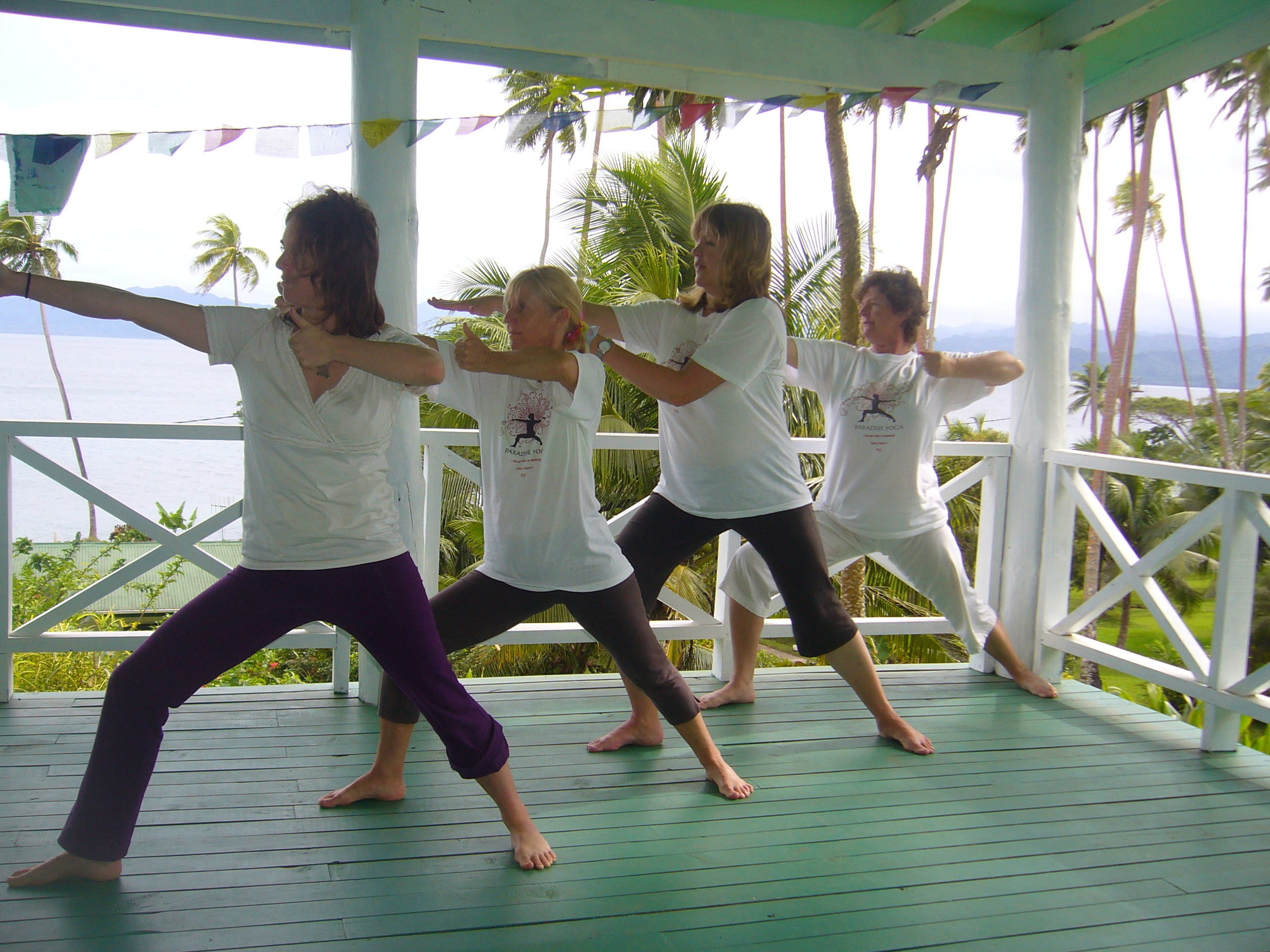
A yoga holiday in Fiji

Yoga tourism does not necessarily mean travel to an ashram, nor necessarily to India, though as the birthplace of yoga it is the activity's locus classicus. Ashrams offering yoga exist, for example, in Canada. Other types of venue describe themselves as "holistic centres" and "yoga holidays", including holidays at "a 5-star resort with a celebrity Yoga Teacher". Yoga holidays are provided in countries including Greece, Sri Lanka, Japan, Thailand, Scotland, France, Morocco, England, Portugal, Spain, Turkey, the Maldives and Wales. Yoga retreats, intended for more serious practice, can be found in many countries, including for instance Costa Rica and Italy. Hotels and guesthouses around the world similarly offer yoga holidays in countries such as Bulgaria and Turkey; "pastoral yoga" in a rural setting can be found in countries including France.

== Reception ==
Young Westerners sometimes make spiritual quests to India, and the multiple varieties of ashram and yoga on offer to them are gently satirised in the Mindful Yoga instructor Anne Cushman's novel Enlightenment for Idiots.

Elizabeth Gilbert's 2006 memoir Eat, Pray, Love, now also a romantic Hollywood film, describes her experiences in an Indian ashram on her journey of self-discovery. Gilbert is thought to have stayed in the Siddha Yoga ashram Gurudev Siddha Peeth in Maharashtra; the film's "Pray" section was set in Ashram Hari Mandir at Pataudi, near Delhi.

== See also ==
- Medical tourism
- Wellness tourism
