= Margarita Boladeras i Cucurella =

Margarita Boladeras I Cucurella
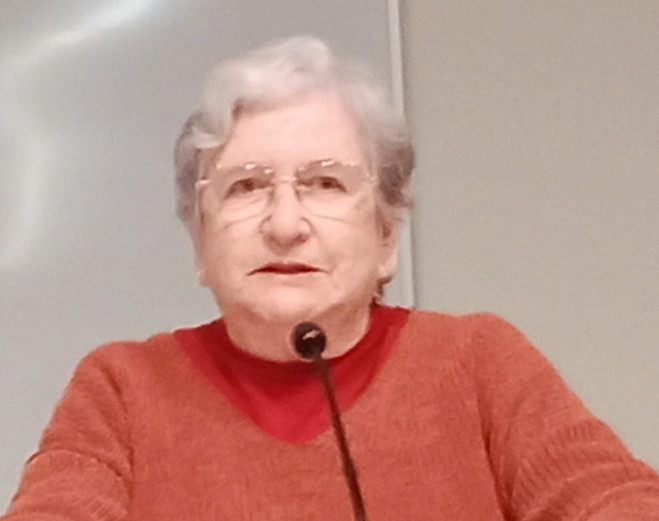
- Born: 19 August 1945 (age 81); Antequera, Andalusia, Spain
- Occupations: Philosopher; academic

Academic background
- Education: University of Barcelona

Margarita Boladeras i Cucurella (born 19 August 1945) is a professor emeritus of Moral and Political Philosophy at the University of Barcelona. She is known for her important contributions in the fields of philosophy, ethics and bioethics.

== Biography ==
Born in Antequera, Andalusia, Margarita Boladeras studied in France, Austria and Germany, therefore she has a good knowledge of French and German languages, together with Catalan and Spanish. She received her BA and PhD in Philosophy from the University of Barcelona, where she has developed most of her academic career. Over the years, she has worked on the development and dissemination of philosophical thought and has actively participated in numerous conferences and seminars, both national and international.

== Research areas ==
Margarita Boladeras' main research areas include:

- Moral Philosophy
- Political Philosophy
- Bioethics
- Human Rights
- Applied Ethics
- Obstetric violence

== Publications ==
Throughout her career, Boladeras has published numerous articles and books on topics related to ethics and political philosophy. Some of her most notable works include:

- La ética de la responsabilidad (1999)
- Filosofía moral y bioética (2004)
- Ética aplicada y derechos humanos (2011)
- El concepto "violencia obstétrica" y el debate actual sobre la atención al nacimiento.
- Bioética, sujeto y cultura
- Carta de Margarita Boladeras a José Luis L. Aranguren

== Acknowledgements ==
Margarita Boladeras has received multiple awards and recognitions throughout her career for her contributions to philosophy and ethics. ,being an influential voice in the debate on bioethics and human rights in Spain and other countries.
