= Slow living =

Lifestyle

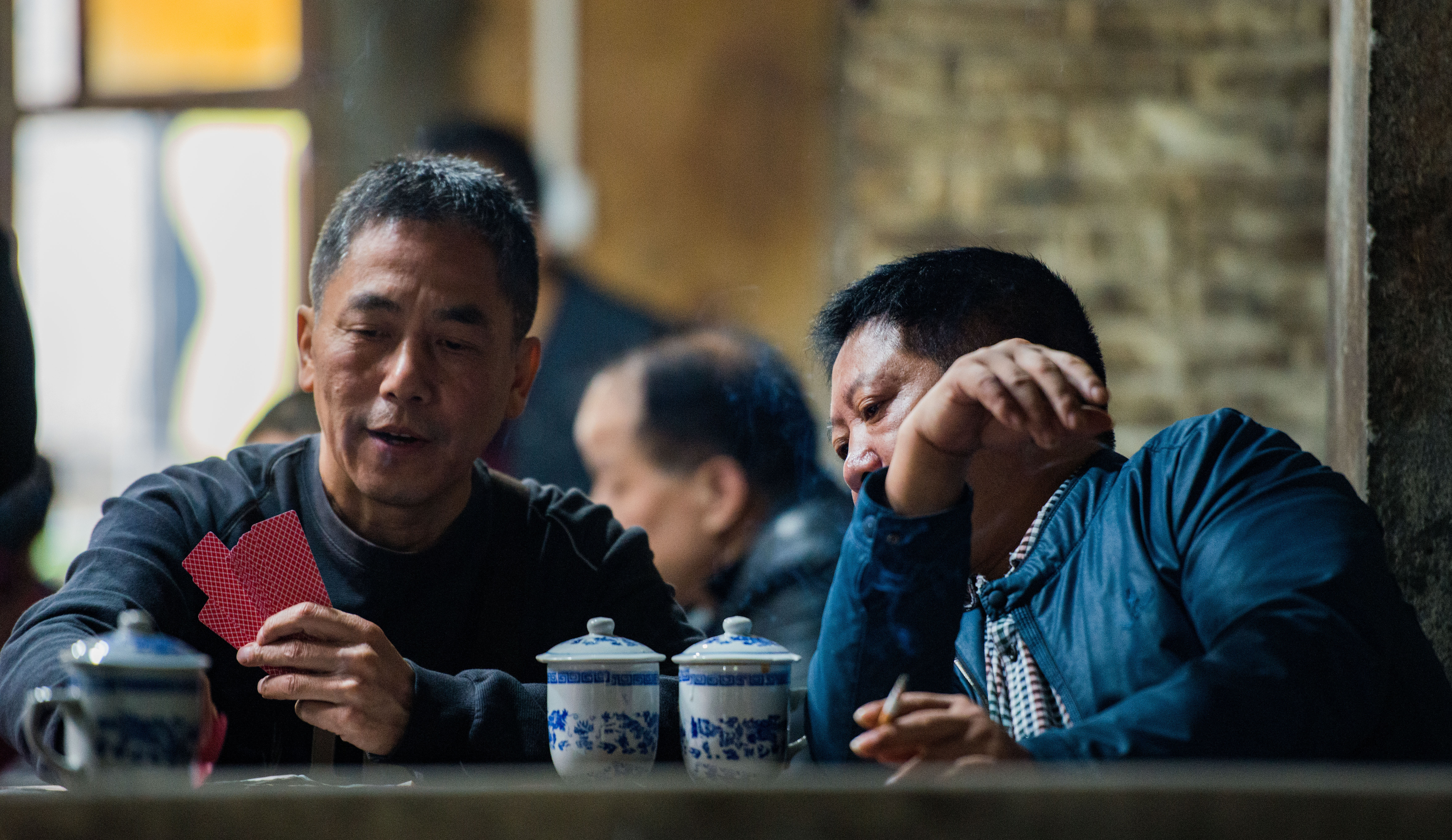
Slow living in a teahouse in Chongqing, China

Slow living is a lifestyle that encourages a slower approach to aspects of everyday life, including completing tasks at a leisurely pace. The origins of this lifestyle are linked to the Italian slow food movement, which emphasised traditional food production techniques in response to the emerging popularity of fast food during the 1980s and 1990s. The lifestyle and movement were heavily influenced by Carlo Petrini, who founded the organization Slow Food in 1986. The organisation continues to promote local, traditional, and high-quality food. The slow living lifestyle encompasses a wide variety of sub-categories, such as slow money and slow cities, which are proposed as solutions to the negative environmental consequences of capitalism and consumerism in alignment with the aims of the green movement.

The slow living movement also emphasizes that a fast-paced way of living is chaotic. In contrast, a slower pace encourages enjoyment of life, a deeper appreciation of sensory experiences, and the ability to live in the present moment. However, slow living does not prevent the adoption of certain technologies, such as mobile phones, the Internet, and access to goods and services. For example, #SlowLiving has been used more than six million times on Instagram.

The backronym "SLOW" is commonly used to summarize the aims of the slow-living lifestyle:

- S: sustainable.
- L: local (using materials and products that are produced locally).
- O: organic (avoiding things grown or made using toxins or genetically engineered).
- W: whole (not processed).

== See also ==
- Slow movement
- Simple living
- Downshifting (lifestyle)
- Positive psychology
- The good life
- In Praise of Slow
- Mindfulness (psychology)
- Wu-wei
- Slow media
- Cittaslow
- Cottagecore
