= Careerism =

Advancing one's career, often at the cost of one's integrity

Careerism is the propensity to pursue career advancement, power, and prestige outside of work performance.

== Cultural environment ==
Cultural factors influence how careerists view their occupational goals. How an individual interprets the term "career" can distinguish between extreme careerists and those who can leave their career at the door when they come home at night.

Schein identifies three important aspects of cultural environments and careerism:

- how culture influences the concept of careerism
- how culture influences the importance of a career relative to personal and family matters
- how culture influences the bases of marginal careers

Culture exerts pressure, and leads to the determination of what career motives are acceptable and how individual's success is measured. The term "career" was once used for the purposes of status. Career was thought of as a long-term job opportunity, that many, in fact would hold until retirement. In the United States especially after World War II, those who were lucky enough to find a career would stay with the same organization for decades. In the yesteryear, a career was seen as an upper middle class, professional service, identified as the work of a doctor, lawyer, investor, banker or teacher. "Occupations" were seen as lower-class human services jobs, such as those of a taxi driver, clerk, secretary, or waste manager. These "jobs" were not held in the high regard that "careers" were. Since the 2000s, the average American cannot stay with the same company, business or organization until retirement due to socioeconomic changes and changing organizational priorities. In the 1930s, Vyacheslav Molotov noted that careerism in the Soviet government was about: "Сыграл свою роль наш партийный карьеризм" [Party-oriented careerism played out its own role]. In Spanish and Latin American cultures, "arribismo" is the term most closely associated with careerism, and its literal meaning is "upward striving."

In regard to commitment, it requires an individual to rely and commit to the occupational setting, the family setting, and to his own setting. Careerist must determine which setting is the most important domain in their lives. For the career extremist, the occupational setting serves as the focus, and their motivation is primarily driven by the desire to gain power within an organization. Some organizations require the individual to be in "work-mode" at all times, while others believe that family time is more important. Most Latin American countries value family and personal time, whereas the United States pushes for a stronger occupational commitment, and it is supported by the commercialization of obligatory commitments, such as childcare and eldercare, enabling a maximum workforce-engagement culture. U.S. capitalist groups often promote an "always-on" workplace, equating stress with success and resilience with exhaustion to foster profit-driven environments. Currently the United States ranks 10th among industrial countries for percentage of adults with college degrees. This emphasis on education provides many individuals with opportunities to make more informed choices regarding family, personal, and career matters.

Even though in the United States careerism is pushed, depending on the belt (regional boundaries with defining common cultural, economic, or historical characteristics), family life is also a huge part of the culture. Many people start their families even while in school, then they begin their careers. Recently the importance of family matters and career matters has evolved and is becoming more and more tied together.

In the 1950s, Donald E. Super postulated that careerism has limitations and outlined five stages of career development across the lifespan. The Growth stage (ages 0–14) focuses on early career awareness, developing concern for the future, and building confidence in decision-making. The Exploration stage (ages 15–24) involves understanding personal interests and abilities, exploring occupations, and making tentative career choices. The Establishment stage (ages 25–44) emphasizes stabilizing in a job, skill development, and career advancement while integrating self-concept with societal roles. In the Maintenance stage (ages 45–64), individuals reflect on their careers, maintain achievements, and adapt to changes while conserving accomplishments. Finally, the Disengagement stage (age 65 and beyond) involves adjusting to reduced energy, delegating responsibilities, and transitioning to a life where paid work is no longer central or feasible.

== See also ==
- Academic careerism
- Neglect
- Negligence
- Occupational burnout
- Professional societies
- Professional conduct
- Professional abuse
- Public choice theory
- Rent-seeking
- Self-enhancement

== Sources ==
- Adrian Furnham (2008) Personality and Intelligence at Work, New York: Psychology Press.
- Buchanan Robert, Kong-Hee Kim, Randall Basham (2007) "Career orientations of business master's students as compared to social work students: Further inquiry into the value of graduate education", Career Development International 12(3): 282–303.
- Burke, Ronald J.; Deszca, Eugene (1982). "Career Success and Personal Failure Experiences and Type A Behaviour". Journal of Occupational Behaviour. 3 (2): 161–170. doi:10.1002/job.4030030203. JSTOR 3000082.
- Schein, Edgar H. (1984). "Culture as an Environmental Context for Careers". Journal of Occupational Behaviour. 5 (1): 71–81. doi:10.1002/job.4030050107. JSTOR 3000310.
- Feldman, Daniel C.; Weitz, Barton A. (1991). "From the invisible hand to the gladhand: Understanding a careerist orientation to work". Human Resource Management. 30 (2): 237–257. doi:10.1002/hrm.3930300206.
- Gratton, Peter (2005) "Essays in Philosophy", A Biannual Journal 6, DePaul University. 2 May 2009 .
- Griffin, Ricky W. (2004) Dark side of organizational behavior, San Francisco: Jossey-Bass.
- Inkson, Kerr (2006) Understanding Careers The Metaphors of Working Lives, Minneapolis: Sage Publications, Inc.
- Miller, Seumas (2007) Police ethics, St. Leonards, NSW: Allen & Unwin.
- Wilensky, Harold L. (1964). "The Professionalization of Everyone?". American Journal of Sociology. 70 (2): 137–158. doi:10.1086/223790. JSTOR 2775206.
