= Bataille =

Bataille is a surname. Notable people with the surname include:

- Christian Bataille (born 1946), French politician
- Eugène Bataille (1853–1891), French illustrator
- Frédéric Bataille (1850–1946), French educator, poet and mycologist
- Georges Bataille (1897–1962), French intellectual and literary figure
- Henri Jules Bataille (1816–1882), French general
- Henry Bataille (1872–1922), French dramatist and poet
- Jean-Pierre Bataille (born 1963), French politician
- Juliette Élisa Bataille (1896–1972), French textile artist
- Laetitia Bataille, French journalist and writer
- Laurence Bataille (1930–1986), French psychoanalyst and writer
- Matthieu Bataille (born 1978), French judoka
- Nicolas Bataille (1926–2008), French comedian and director
- Sylvia Bataille (1908–1993), French actress
