= 24h01 =

Biannual Belgian journalism review

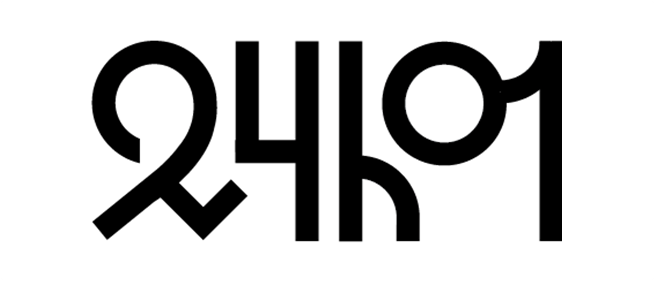
24h01 logo

24h01 was a Belgian biannual review of copyright journalism and reportage based in Brussels, Belgium. The first issue was published in October 2013. It was sold in Brussels and Wallonia, as well as in Paris and northern France.

== Overview ==
Halfway between a book and a magazine, it was the first Belgian mook. It was published in French twice a year. 24h01 was part of slow journalism containing long reports and in-depth investigations. Later its frequency was switched to quarterly. Catherine Joie was the editor-in-chief of the magazine.

In June 2018 24h01 ceased publication due to the financial problems. The twelfth issue was the last.
