= Wellness tourism =

Tourism for the purpose of health and wellness

Wellness tourism is voluntary travel to world-wide destinations for the purpose of promoting health and well-being through physical, psychological, or spiritual activities.

Wellness tourism aims to control stress levels and promote a healthy lifestyle. Specific types of wellness tourism include meditation and multiple types of yoga, such as classical or exercise-based, as well as treatments that include conventional, alternative, complementary or herbal. These types of wellness tourism account for the global market growth of the industry and the impact and issues that are currently within the industry or will occur in the future.

== Market ==
In 2021, the global wellness tourism industry was valued at $850.55 billion and is expected to grow to $2.1 trillion by 2030.

The market primarily includes services like lodging, transportation, activities, and food and drink. The lodging segment dominates these sectors as it accounted for about 23% of the revenue in 2022. Visiting a spa has become more prevalent among tourists and mass luxury brands such as Four Seasons Hotels and Resorts, Aman Resorts, Oberoi Group, Mandarin Oriental Hotel Group, and Ritz-Carlton Hotel Company have rapidly incorporated house-brand spas into the leisure experience. Hotels may also gratify wellness tourists by housing third party spa operators, such as Clarins.

North America is the biggest market of wellness tourism across the globe with a revenue share of about 40 percent as of 2022. International tourism has the highest projected growth in the global industry with Europe as the second largest and the Asia Pacific as third. Extreme growth is expected from Asia, the Middle East/North Africa, Sub-Saharan Africa and other developing countries that can offer unique ‘wellness’ experiences at much lower costs. Within the US $3.4 trillion spa and wellness economy, wellness tourism is estimated to total US$494 billion or 14.6 percent of all 2013 domestic and international tourism expenditures.

Wellness tourists are generally high-yield tourists, spending, on average, 130 percent more than the average tourist. In 2020, international wellness tourists spent 35% more than the average international tourist; domestic wellness tourists spend about 177% more than the average domestic tourist. Domestic wellness tourism is significantly larger than its international equivalent, representing 84 percent of wellness travel and 68 percent of expenditures (or $299 billion). International wellness tourism represents 16 percent of wellness travel and 32 percent of expenditures ($139 billion market). Wellness tourists are generally wealthier and more willing to spend greater amounts of money on these types of experiences and services.

The wellness tourism market includes primary and secondary wellness tourists. Primary wellness tourists travel entirely for wellness purposes while secondary wellness tourists engage in wellness-related activities as part of a trip. Secondary wellness tourists constitute the significant majority (92%) of total wellness tourism trips and expenditures (85 percent).

== Industry players ==
Wellness travelers may seek procedures or treatments using conventional, alternative, complementary, herbal, or homeopathic medicine. Advertisers may use the term wellness to promote a wide range of miscellaneous products and services. Players in wellness tourism may target healthy tourists who want to maintain and promote their health, or cure guests who want to recover from illness and seek healing of bodily ailments. Wellness tourism suffers from skepticism about the quality and effectiveness of the treatments and pursuits on offer.

Individual wellness practitioners and programs provide diverse services such as beauty treatments, exercise opportunities, including physical fitness and sports, healthy diet and weight management, health-related education, and relaxation and stress relief methods in luxurious, privately rent resort centers, small hotels or sections of larger hotels themed for the purpose all over the world.

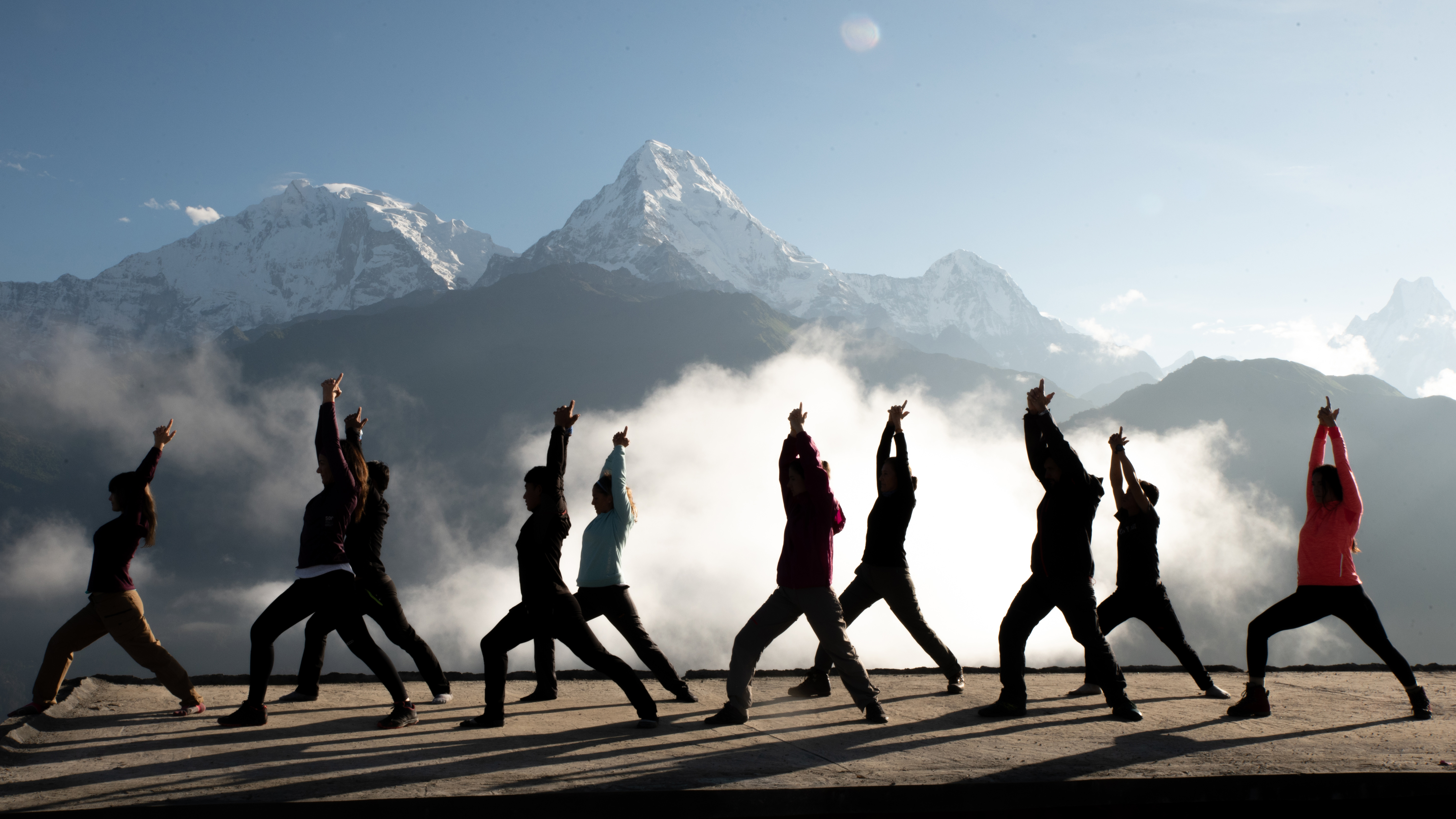
Tourists doing yoga in Poon Hill, Nepal

Wellness travelers pursue these diverse services as a form of stress control. Popular relaxation methods used to control stress include spiritual tourism, including meditation and yoga, whether classical or as exercise; Spiritual tourism is a growing practice that has evolved from a religious pilgrimage into traveling to a sacred spot in hopes of finding a special feeling.

Cruise ships offering wellness programs including the use of on-board spas. Day spas and destination spas offer short-term, residential programs to address specific health concerns, reduce stress, or support lifestyle improvement.

== Destinations ==
Wellness tourism is an identifiable niche market in at least 30 countries. Twenty countries accounted for 85 percent of global wellness tourism expenditures in 2012. The top five countries alone (United States, Germany, Japan, France, Austria) account for more than half the market (59 percent of expenditures).

=== North America ===
As of 2014, the US is the largest wellness tourism market, with $180.7 billion in annual, combined international and domestic expenditures. The US is the top destination for inbound international wellness tourism, with 7.1 million international, inbound trips. Europe and high-income Asian countries are primary sources of wellness tourists traveling to the US.

Domestic tourism accounts for the majority (94 percent) of wellness trips in North America. Americans and Canadians receive—and take—few vacation days compared to workers in other countries making domestic, weekend trips the most popular wellness travel option.

=== Europe ===
Europe is the second largest wellness tourism market, with $158.4 billion in annual, combined international and domestic expenditures; the region ranks highest in number of wellness trips with 216.2 million, compared to North America's 171.7 in 2013. Europeans have long believed in health benefits derived from mineral baths, saunas, thalassotherapy, and other natural and water-based treatments. Thermal resorts and hotels in Turkey and Hungary cater to wellness tourists, many of whom are subsidized by host countries such as Norway and Denmark seeking to mitigate costs of medical procedures for patients with chronic conditions requiring expensive surgeries.

=== Asia-Pacific ===
The Asia-Pacific region ranks as the third largest with $6.4 billion in annual, combined international and domestic expenditures. Ancient regional wellness traditions include Ayurveda, Yoga, Traditional Chinese Medicine, Hilot, and Thai massage. Within Asia, the countries with the highest numbers of domestic wellness trips were China, India and Japan, while China, Thailand and Indonesia led in inbound international wellness arrivals and trips.

=== Latin America-Caribbean ===
Latin America and the Caribbean is the fourth largest region for wellness tourism in terms of both the number of trips and expenditures. Domestic tourism accounts for approximately 71 percent of wellness tourism trips, and 54 percent of wellness tourism expenditures.

=== Middle East and Africa ===
The Middle East and Africa currently represent the smallest regions for wellness tourism. The Middle East boasts a long tradition of bathing associated with hammams ("Turkish baths"), and some older facilities are being modernized to cater to spa-seeking tourists. Tourism is experiencing growth in the region, prompting governments and private developers to establish new facilities.

In Africa, wellness tourism is concentrated in a few regions such as South Africa and the Maghreb, and it is predominantly driven by international tourists.

== Criticism ==
Wellness tourism advocates suggest that vacations improve physical well-being, happiness, and productivity, citing that health-oriented trips give travelers a fresh perspective and positively affect creativity, resilience, problem solving, and capacity for coping with stress. Yet it is difficult to quantify the health benefits since many of the wellness practices are unregulated, and the growing industry negatively impacts the destinations that travelers flock to.

=== Quantifying Wellness ===
One study found that sectors of the wellness industry including healthy eating, physical wellness, and mental resilience had little to no statistical relationship with indicating better health. While these aspects of wellness are widely regarded to improve health outcomes, some believe that a higher level of spending in these areas does not actually improve health. In these sectors, the offerings of Wellness Tourism experiences do not have a tangible impact on the overall health of the consumer.

=== Regulatory Issues ===
Many Wellness Tourism practices are unregulated, and due to the breadth of countries and organizations in the industry, it is difficult to maintain standards across experiences. Over 60% of retreats admitted to not engaging with regulations or certifications beside basic health and safety checks. In many instances, safety cannot be guaranteed during wellness practices. There are several instances where tourists on ayahuasca retreats have died while under the influence of unregulated drugs. There have also been instances of tourists dying in sweat lodges and incidents involving cults during meditation retreats. There is also little regulation when it comes to employee training, and many retreat employees are only trained internally by their superiors. With the lack of regulations, it is difficult for consumers to determine which retreats are safe.

=== Environmental Impact ===
Another impact of tourism is the environmental impacts on the countries tourists flock to. As many wellness tourism destinations are developing countries, many of these countries are not equipped to handle the heavy influx of tourists surrounding the wellness industry. The draw of these locations is that they are remote: an escape from society. However, these remote locations lack the infrastructure to handle sewage, landfill, and enough natural resources to support tourists. In 2016, over 1,500 wellness retreat locations in India admitted to dumping sewage directly into rivers, and Tulum faced similar issues. Wellness tourism practices also destroy natural resources and habitats; with the rising fad of ayahuasca retreats, plants were depleted naturally and providers moved to farming them commercially, leading to deforestation to make room for fields.

== See also ==
- Travel
- Tourism
- Medical tourism
- Sleep tourism
- Wellness
- Yoga tourism
