= Demotion =

Lowering of a person's rank within an organization

A demotion is a compulsory reduction in an employee's rank or job title within the organizational hierarchy of a company, public service department, or other body. A demotion may also lead to the loss of other privileges associated with a more senior rank and/or a reduction in salary or benefits. An employee may be demoted for violating the rules of the organization by a behavior such as excessive lateness, misconduct, or negligence. In some cases, an employee may be demoted as an alternative to being laid off, if the employee has poor job performance or if the company is facing a financial crisis. A move to a position at the same rank or level elsewhere in the organization is called a lateral move or deployment. A voluntary move to a lower level is also a deployment as it is not a compulsory reduction in level. Demotion is often misinterpreted simply as the opposite of a promotion. However, it is only one means of undergoing a reduction in work level.

== Types ==
Within the continuum of disciplinary options available within most organizations, a demotion falls in the middle range of severity. Minor violations of rules, or the first violation of a rule will typically result in a verbal or written warning or a suspension without pay. At the other extreme, for severe violations of the rules, such as embezzlement or sabotage, an employee will typically be fired and/or the company will file criminal or civil charges. In sports leagues, when teams are transferred between divisions, the worst-ranked teams in the higher division are relegated (or demoted) to the lower division.

== Legal limitations ==
In certain circumstances, it can be impermissible for an employer to demote an employee. For example, in some jurisdictions it is illegal to demote an employee who has acted as a whistleblower, in retaliation for their reporting of violations of the law to appropriate authorities.

It may also be impermissible to demote an employee due to their race, religion, or physical disability. In some instances, where an employee has a religious restriction or physical limitation that prevents them from carrying out certain job functions, an employer transferring that employee to another position must take care that the transfer not be seen as a demotion, as indicated by reduced pay or authority, unless the employer can demonstrate that there is no equivalent position to which the employee could have been transferred.

== Other uses ==
The word demotion is not restricted to the world of employment; it can be used in a number of areas.

== See also ==
- Downshifting (lifestyle)
