= Distributed economy =

Concept in network theory

Distributed economies (DE) is a term that was coined by Allan Johansson et al. in 2005.

== Definition ==
There is no official definition for DE, but it could be described as a regional approach to promote innovation by small and medium-sized enterprises, as well as sustainable development. The concept is illustrated in the figure below, that shows centralised, decentralised and distributed economies respectively.

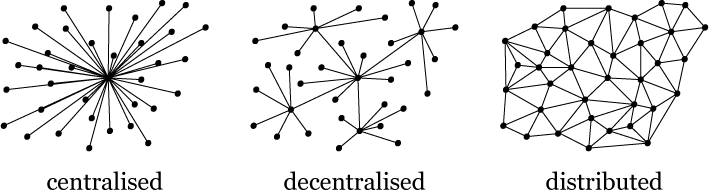
Different types of economies

== Features ==
The relations in DE are much more complex than those in a centralised economy. This feature makes the whole economy more stable – leaf nodes no longer rely on just one central node. It also resembles ecological networks, making it a good practical example of industrial ecology. A big advantage of DE is that it enables entities within the network to work much more with regional/local natural resources, finances, human capital, knowledge, technology, and so on. It also makes the entities more flexible to respond to the local market needs and thus generating a bigger innovation drive. By doing this, they become a better reflection of their social environment and in that way they can improve quality of life. The whole concept of DE is not at all a new invention – this is how most pre-industrial economies were organised. However, information technology has opened new doors for the concept: information can be shared much more easily and small-scale production facilities (rapid prototyping) are becoming cheaper. The DE concept works well with the development of fab labs.

Not all industries are fit for DE; for example, many chemical processes only become economically feasible & efficient on a large scale. On the other hand, bio-energy and consumer products are interesting candidates.

== See also ==
- Decentralized planning (economics) – Type of economic system
- Distributism – Economic theory promoting local control
- Long tail – Feature of some statistical distributions
- Open-design movement – Movement for publicly shared designs
- Slow design – Social movement
