= Alternativas Económicas =

Monthly financial news magazine in Spain

- Editor: Andreu Missé
- Categories: News magazine
- Frequency: Monthly
- Publisher: Alternativas Económicas
- Founded: 2013
- First issue: 1 April 2013; 12 years ago
- Country: Spain
- Based in: Barcelona
- Language: Spanish
- Website: Alternativas Económicas

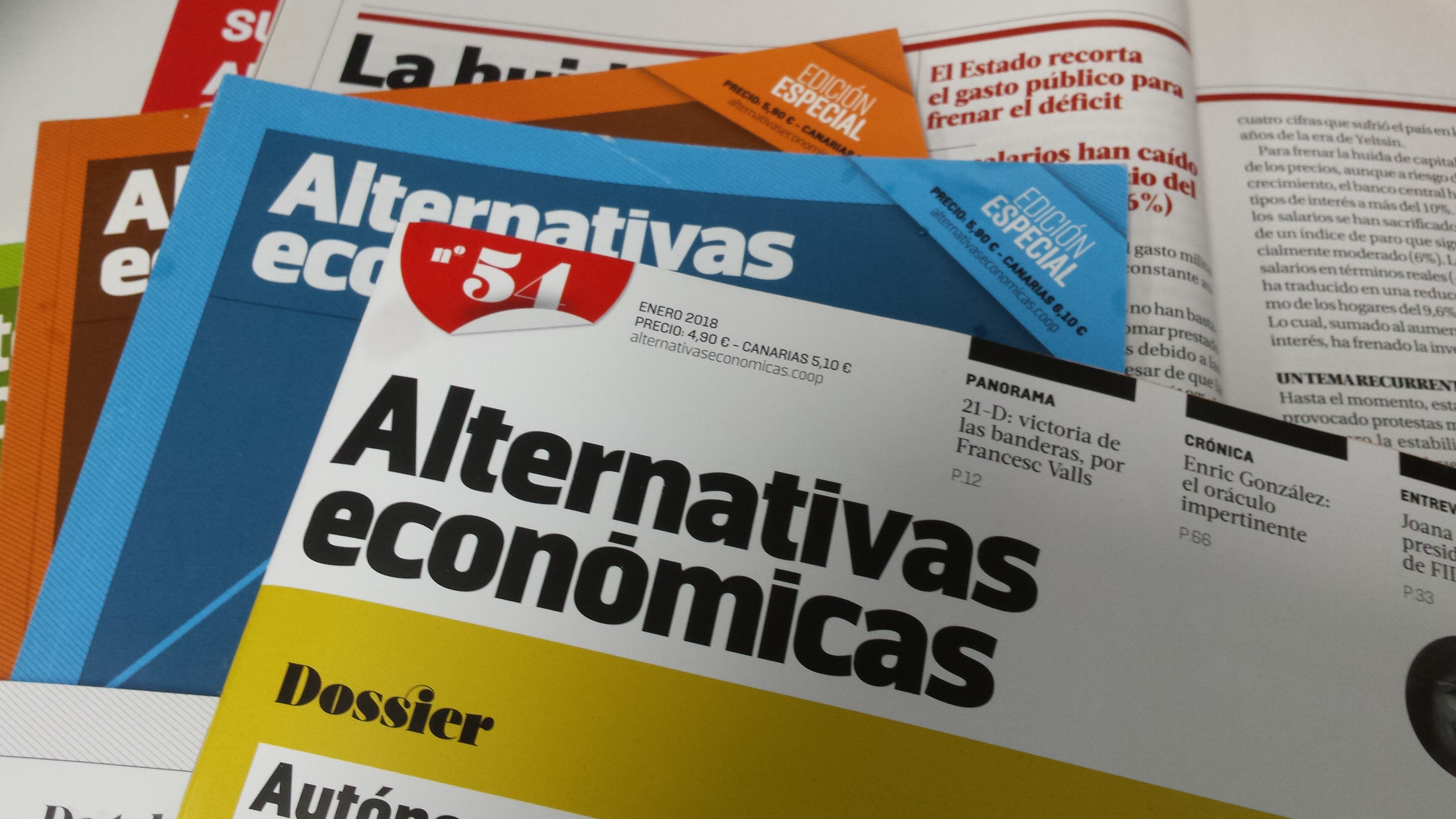
Various issues of Alternativas Económicas

Alternativas Económicas is a Spanish language monthly news magazine, which focuses on financial and social events, published in Barcelona, Spain. It is one of the publications which adopt slow journalism.

== History and profile ==
Alternativas Económicas was first published in April 2013. Pere Rusiñol, Ariadna Trillas and Mariana Vilnitzky are the cofounders and editors of the magazine, which was modelled on Alternatives économiques, a French magazine published by a worker cooperative for journalists in France. Alternativas Económicas is published monthly by the worker cooperative for Spanish journalists with the same name, Alternativas Económicas. The Spanish Confederation of Worker Cooperatives is also among the members of the monthly.

The headquarters of Alternativas Económicas is in Barcelona. Andreu Missé is the editor of the magazine. The contributors include Antonio Franco, Xavier Vidal-Folch, Ignacio Escolar, Joaquín Estefanía, Soledad Gallego-Díaz and Sebastián Serrano. They are mostly journalists who previously worked for El País, Público and El Periódico de Catalunya. The editorial team also includes specialists from different background.

== See also ==
- List of magazines in Spain
