= Least publishable unit =

Smallest amount of information that can generate a publication in a peer-reviewed journal

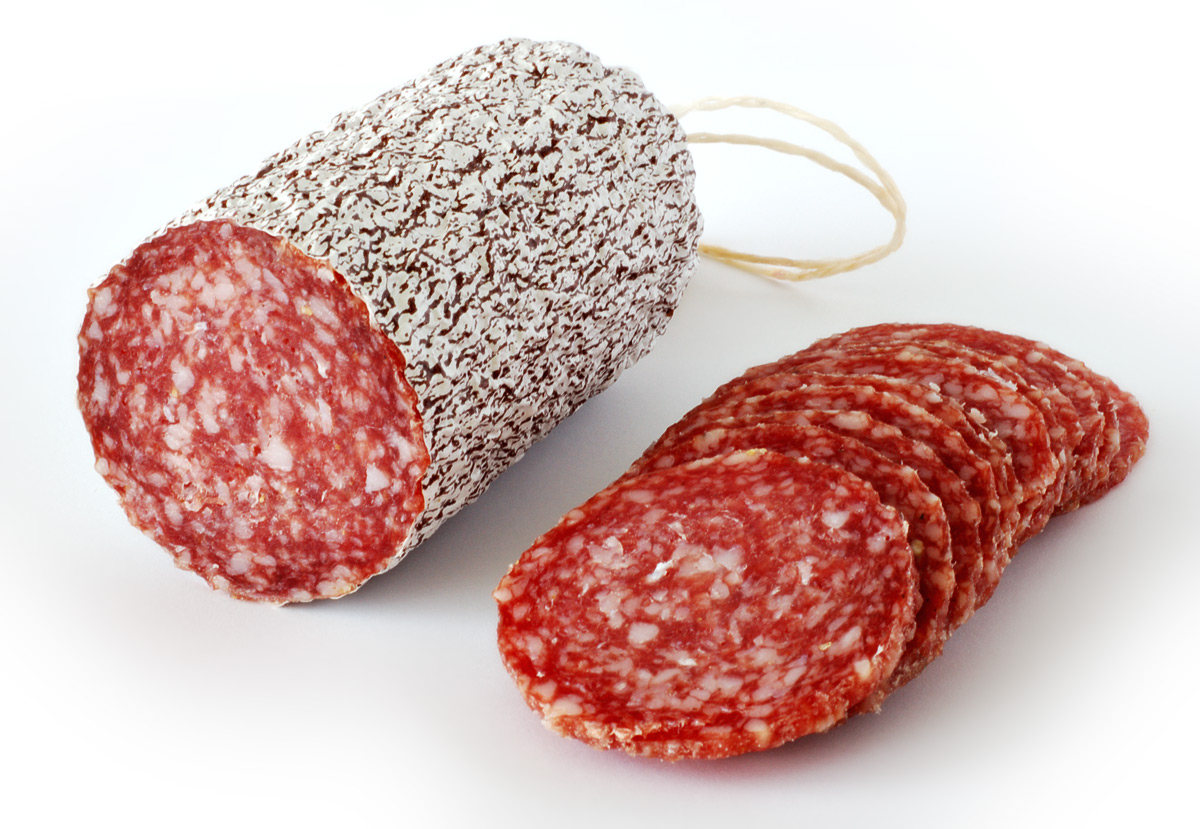
Both research papers and salami can be cut into multiple, smaller pieces.

In academic publishing, the least publishable unit (LPU), also smallest publishable unit (SPU), minimum publishable unit (MPU), loot, or publon, is the minimum amount of information that can be used to generate a publication in a peer-reviewed venue, such as a journal or a conference. (Maximum publishable unit and optimum publishable unit are also used.) The term is often used as a joking, ironic, or derogatory reference to the strategy of artificially inflating the quantity of one's publications.

Publication of the results of research is an essential part of science. The number of publications is often used to assess the work of a scientist and as a basis for distributing research funds. In order to achieve a high rank in such an assessment, there is a trend to split up research results into smaller parts that are published separately, thus inflating the number of publications. This process has been described as splitting the results into the smallest publishable units.

"Salami publication", sometimes also referred to as "salami slicing" or "salami science", is a variant of the smallest-publishable-unit strategy. In salami publishing, data gathered by one research project is separately reported (wholly or in part) in multiple end publications. Salami publishing, named by analogy with the thin slices made from a larger salami sausage, is generally considered questionable when not explicitly labeled, as it may lead to the same data being counted multiple times as apparently independent results in aggregate studies. Salami slicing is considered a type of scientific misconduct. At the same time, identifying "salami" can be ambiguous, and there are justifications for publishing multiple research perspectives in multiple scholarly disciplines to make knowledge accessible in different contexts.

When data gathered in one research project are partially reported as if a single study, a problem of statistical significance can arise. Using a 5% significance threshold, if every tested null hypotheses is true, roughly 1 in 20 of them would be rejected by chance alone. Partially reported research projects must use a more stringent threshold when testing for statistical significance but often do not do this.

There is no consensus among academics about whether people should seek to make their publications least publishable units, and it has long been resisted by some journal editors. Particularly for people just getting started in academic publication, writing a few small articles provides a way of getting used to how the system of peer review and professional publication works, and it does indeed help to boost publication count. But publishing too many LPUs is thought not to impress peers when it comes time to seek promotion beyond the assistant professor (or equivalent) level. Also, LPUs may not always be the most efficient way to pass on knowledge, because they break up ideas into small pieces, sometimes forcing people to look up many cross-references. Multiple salami slices also occupy more journal pages than a single synthetic article that contains the same information. On the other hand, a small piece of information is easily digestible, and the reader may not need more information than what is in the LPU.

== See also ==
- Academic careerism
- H-index
- Impact factor
- Peer review
- Publication bias
- Publish or perish
- Publons
- Scientometrics
