= Publish or perish =

Phrase in academia

"Publish or perish" is an aphorism describing the pressure to publish academic work in order to succeed in an academic career. Such institutional pressure is generally strongest at research universities. Some researchers have identified the publish or perish environment as a contributing factor to the replication crisis.

Successful publications bring attention to scholars and their sponsoring institutions, which can help continued funding and their careers. In popular academic perception, scholars who publish infrequently, or who focus on activities that do not result in publications, such as instructing undergraduates, may lose ground in competition for available tenure-track positions. The pressure to publish has been cited as a cause of poor work being submitted to academic journals. The value of published work is often determined by the prestige of the academic journal it is published in. Journals can be measured by their impact factor (IF), which is the average number of citations to articles published in a particular journal over the last two years.

== Academic opinion ==
The pressure to publish has been strongly criticized on the basis that over-emphasis on publishing may decrease the value of resulting scholarship, as scholars must spend more time scrambling to publish whatever they can get into print, rather than spending time developing significant research agendas. Similarly, humanities scholar Camille Paglia has described the publish or perish paradigm as "tyranny" and further writes that "The [academic] profession has become obsessed with quantity rather than quality. ... One brilliant article should outweigh one mediocre book."

The pressure to publish or perish also detracts from the time and effort professors can devote to teaching undergraduate courses and mentoring graduate students. The rewards for exceptional teaching rarely match the rewards for exceptional research, which encourages faculty to favor the latter whenever they conflict.

Also, publish-or-perish is linked to scientific misconduct or at least questionable ethics. It has also been argued that the quality of scientific work has suffered due to publication pressures. Physicist Peter Higgs, namesake of the Higgs boson, was quoted in 2013 as saying that academic expectations since the 1990s would likely have prevented him from both making his groundbreaking research contributions and attaining tenure: "It's difficult to imagine how I would ever have enough peace and quiet in the present sort of climate to do what I did in 1964 ... Today I wouldn't get an academic job. It's as simple as that. I don't think I would be regarded as productive enough."

According to some researchers, the publish or perish culture might also perpetuate bias in academic institutions. Overall, women publish less frequently than men, and when they do publish their work, it receives fewer citations than their male counterparts - even when published in journals with significantly higher impact factors. Furthermore, one study pointed out that gaps in the promotion and progress of women in academic medicine may be significantly influenced by gender-based variances in article citations.

Research-oriented universities may attempt to manage the unhealthy aspects of the publish or perish practices, but their administrators often argue that some pressure to produce cutting-edge research is necessary to motivate scholars early in their careers to focus on research advancement, and learn to balance its achievement with the other responsibilities of the professorial role.

== Variants ==
The MIT Media Lab's director Nicholas Negroponte instituted the motto "demo or die", privileging demonstrations over publication. Another director, Joi Ito, modified this to "deploy or die", emphasizing the adoption of the technology.

== History ==
The earliest known use of the term in an academic context was in a 1928 journal article. The phrase appeared in a non-academic context in the 1932 book, Archibald Cary Coolidge: Life and Letters, by Harold Jefferson Coolidge. In 1938, the phrase appeared in a college-related publication. According to Eugene Garfield, the expression first appeared in an academic context in Logan Wilson's book, "The Academic Man: A Study in the Sociology of a Profession", published in 1942. Others have attributed the phrase to Columbia University geneticist Kimball C. Atwood III.

== See also ==
- Academic careerism
- Research Integrity Risk Index
- Forced ranking
- Least publishable unit, reduction to which is often disparagingly labeled "salami slicing"
- Scientometrics
- Slow science
- Up or out
