= Carl Honoré =

Canadian journalist (born 1967)

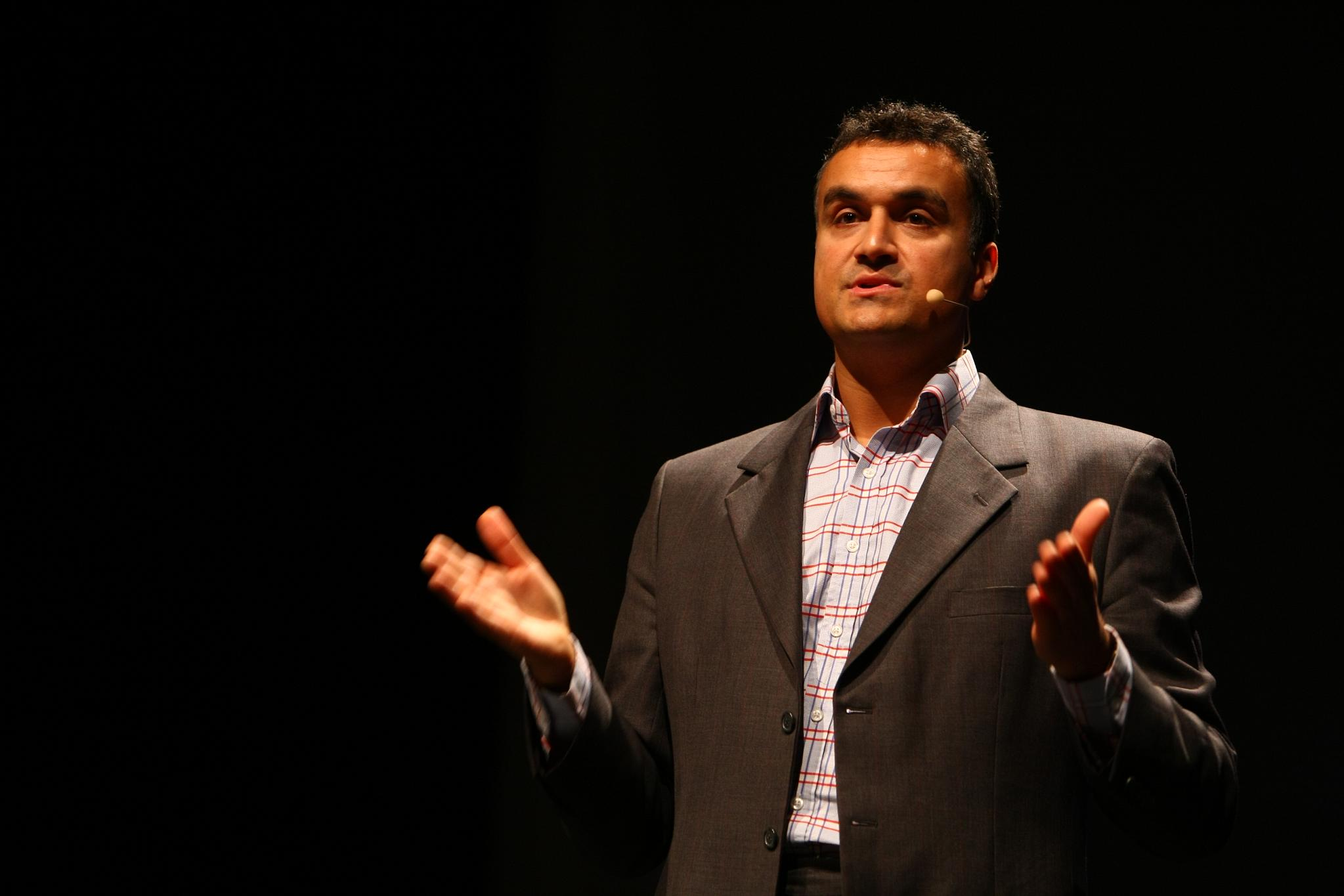
Carl Honoré (2008)

Carl Honoré (born 29 December 1967 in Scotland) is a Canadian journalist who wrote the internationally best-selling book In Praise of Slow (2004) about the Slow Movement.

In 2008, he came out with a new book, Under Pressure: Rescuing Our Children from the Culture of Hyper-Parenting, which promotes a more relaxed and more hands-off technique for raising and educating children: slow parenting.

Honoré was born in Scotland, but considers Edmonton his hometown. After he graduated from the University of Edinburgh with a degree in History and Italian, he worked with street children in Brazil, which inspired him to take up journalism. Since 1991, he has reported from all over Europe and South America, spending three years as a correspondent in Buenos Aires. His work has appeared in publications including the Economist, Observer, American Way, National Post, Globe and Mail, Houston Chronicle, and the Miami Herald. He has appeared on Fox and Friends and Dennis Miller and was the subject of a double-page spread in Newsweek. He currently works and lives in London with his wife, Miranda France, and their two children.

== Bibliography ==
Honoré's first book, In Praise of Slow: Challenging the Cult of Speed (HarperOne, 2004; U.S. title In Praise of Slowness), traces the history of humans' relationship with time, efficiency and speed and the consequences. It describes 'slow movements' that have gained attention in various contexts, such as at work, home and schools.

In his 2008 book Under Pressure: Rescuing Our Children from the Culture of Hyper-Parenting, Honoré explores potential 'dangers' of parents micro-managing their children and compares too much and parents can slow down approaches. The book quotes a few lines from a leadership coach Nigel Cumberland: "If you deny a toddler the chance to play and then put him in a preschool where he is always competing and being measured, you get fear and that leads to an unwillingness to take risks, you end up with boring adults".

In 2013 Honoré's third book The Slow Fix: Solve Problems, Work Smarter and Live Better in a Fast World, was published. He questions the wide use of superficial, short-term quick fixes and argues that slow fixes are better able to deliver longer-lasting ways of addressing complex problems.

In December 2018 Simon & Schuster published Bolder: Making the most of our longer lives.

== See also ==
- Slow parenting
- Slow journalism
