= Slow reading =

Intentional reduction of reading speed

Slow reading is the intentional reduction in the speed of reading, carried out to increase comprehension or pleasure. The concept appears to have originated in the study of philosophy and literature as a technique to more fully comprehend and appreciate a complex text.

More recently, there has been increased interest in slow reading as a result of the slow movement and its focus on decelerating the pace of modern life.

== Related terms ==
The use of slow reading in literary criticism is sometimes referred to as close reading. Of less common usage is the term, "deep reading".

Slow reading is contrasted with speed reading which involves techniques to increase the rate of reading without adversely affecting comprehension, and contrasted with skimming which employs visual page cues to increase reading speed.

== Philosophy and literature ==
The earliest reference to slow reading appears to be in Friedrich Nietzsche's preface to the 1887 Daybreak: "It is not for nothing that one has been a philologist, perhaps one is a philologist still, that is to say, a teacher of slow reading."

Sven Birkerts, in his book The Gutenberg Elegies, stated "Reading, because we control it, is adaptable to our needs and rhythms. We are free to indulge our subjective associative impulse; the term I coin for this is deep reading: the slow and meditative possession of a book." Birkerts' emphasis on the importance of personal control over the speed of reading is echoed by Pullman, who additionally argued that taking control of the pace of one's reading is a form of personal freedom, and develops an appreciation of democracy. A similar view was stated by Postman, who noted the character of the ordinary citizen of the 19th century, a mind that could listen for hours on end to political orations clearly shaped by a culture favouring text. Postman warns that reading books is important for developing rational thinking and political astuteness.

Lindsay Waters, Executive Editor for the Humanities at Harvard University Press, declared a worldwide reading crisis resulting from our global push toward productivity. He asserts that young children are learning to read faster, skipping phonetics and diagramming sentences, and concludes that these children will not grow up to read Milton. He foresees the end of graduate English literature programs. "There is something similar between a reading method that focuses primarily on the bottom-line meaning of a story in a novel and the economic emphasis on the bottom line that makes automobile manufacturers speed up assembly lines." He advised re-introducing time into reading: "The mighty imperative is to speed everything up, but there might be some advantage in slowing things down. People are trying slow eating. Why not slow reading?"

== Slow movement ==
Carl Honoré, an advocate of the slow movement, discusses slow reading in his book In Praise of Slow. He recommends slow reading as one of several practices to decelerate from the fast pace of modern life. Laura Casey points out that the increasing availability of instant communication technologies, such as texting and social media like Facebook and Twitter, may be contributing to the decline of slow reading.

In 2008, novelist I. Alexander Olchowski founded the Slow Book Movement to advocate for reading practices related to the slow movement, including reading light material at a relaxed pace for pleasure, reading complex materials slowly for insight, reading materials of local interest and by local authors, and community building around local libraries and reading events.

== Research ==
While there is substantial research about involuntary slow reading, which can arise from a lack of fluency and is a predictor of dyslexia, there are a few studies which demonstrate the positive value of voluntary slow reading. Nell (1988) showed that there is substantial rate variability during natural reading, with most-liked pages being read significantly slower. Sherry Jr. and Schouten (2002) suggested that close reading could have commercial application as a research method for the use of poetry in marketing. Advocates of speed-reading point out that subvocalization slows the speed of reading, but studies by Carver found no other observable negative effect on the reading process, and observed that the slower pace seemed to improve comprehension.

== See also ==
- Close reading
- Reading (process)
- Speed reading
