= Sleep tourism =

Tourism focused on sleep

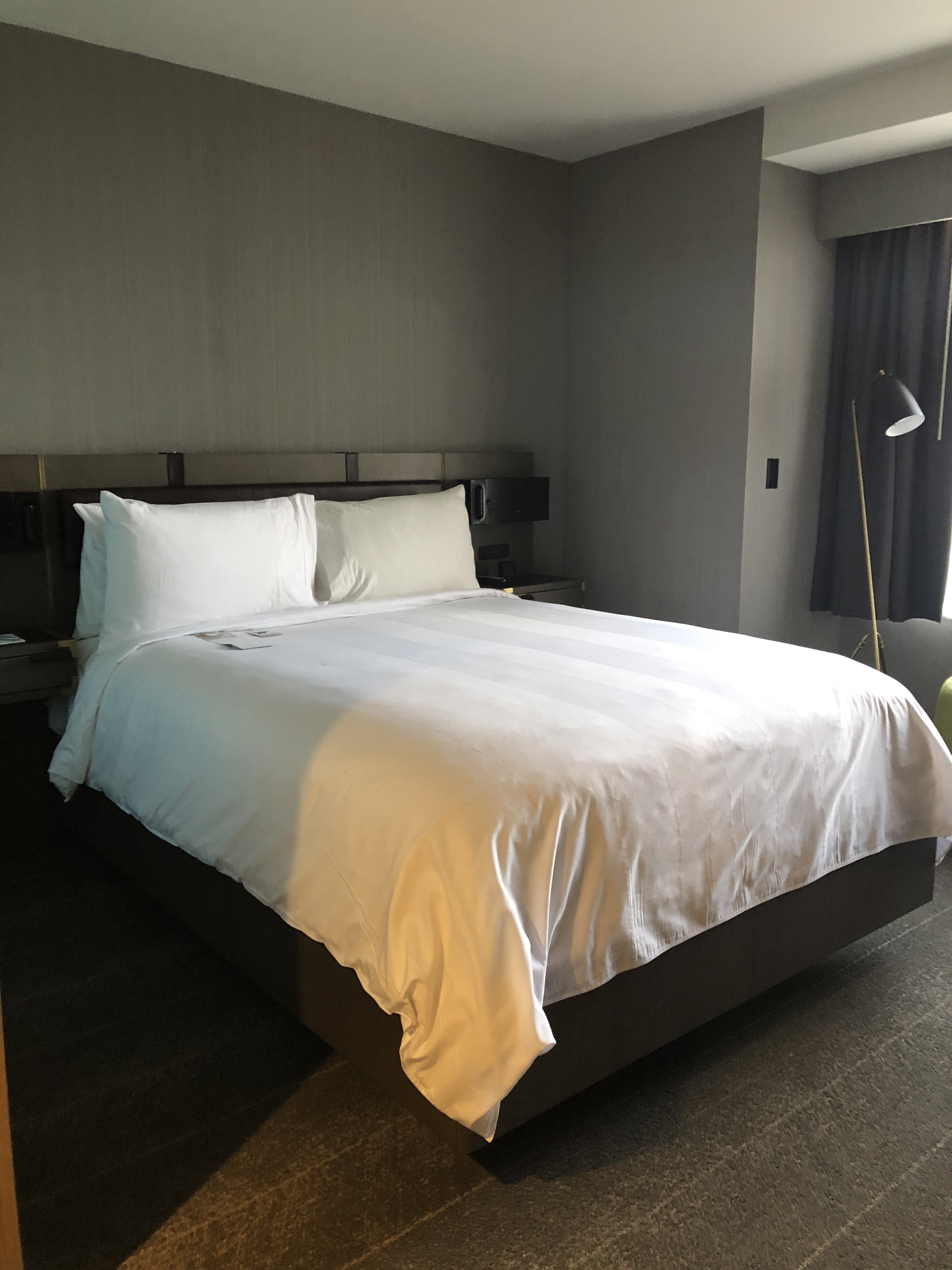
A hotel room with minimal distractions

Sleep tourism is a sector of the wellness tourism industry and the slow travel movement. Specialized recommendations and treatments are offered to help improve the quality of a tourist's sleep.

== Background ==
Slow travel, which focuses on relaxation, restoration and spending time in a single place rather than sightseeing in multiple locations over the course of a trip, has roots dating back to the 19th century.

By the 1960s, hotels began focusing on amenities that would improve sleep. By advertising their use of luxury mattresses, sheets, pillows, blackout curtains, and white noise machines, the affluence of exclusive accommodations for travelers rose.

From around the mid-2010s, the focus on sleep as a wellness issue increased. The COVID-19 pandemic abruptly led to quarantines, public lockdowns, travel bans, and curfews, disrupting people's sleep schedules. This increased interest in sleep studies as an overall necessity in human performance. As this became a focus, hotels and resorts recognized a marketing niche they could exploit.

== Programs and Amenities ==
Programs may focus on medical treatments or on other approaches, and may focus on people who have difficulty falling asleep, people who experience interrupted sleep, people who don't feel rested after sleeping, snoring, breathing difficulties, and dreaming.

Some programs do sleep assessments and recommend treatments, which may include dietary, exercise, and other lifestyle changes; supplements; training in meditation; hypnosis; traditional medicine; salt floats; or therapies like CPAP, phototherapy, electromagnetic therapy, vibration therapy, hydrotherapy, and infrared therapy. Some hotels offer artificial-intelligence assisted beds that can be paired with a guest's phone or distraction-free rooms that include no television or artwork. Resorts in Sweden promote the country's long cool winter nights and culture as ideal for a sleep vacation.

== Industry ==
There are programs in multiple countries, including Australia, Bali, Fiji, Greece, India, Italy, the Maldives, Mexico, New Zealand, Spain, Sweden, Switzerland, Thailand, the UK, and the US.
