= Juliette Élisa Bataille =

French textile artist

Juliette Élisa Bataille (1896 – 1972) was a French textile and outsider artist. She created small embroideries with the character of paintings, by sewing silk, cotton, and wool onto rectangular pieces of cardboard. She is known for the works she composed during a three-year period at Ville-Évrard Psychiatric Hospital. She met the artist Jean Dubuffet at the hospital, who was collecting art brut.

Bataille's works are held in the collections of the Lille Métropole Museum of Modern, Contemporary and Outsider Art and the Collection de l'art brut. Her work has been exhibited at the American Folk Art Museum and the Galerie René Drouin.

== Early life and marriage ==
Juliette Élisa Bataille was born on 15 June 1896 in Étaples, Pas-de-Calais, the third of ten children. She was married in 1917. After her husband was mobilized to serve in the French Army in World War I, she moved to Paris with her sister. She was employed as a saleswoman and a tram driver, before finding work as a florist. Following her husband's return from the war, he was abusive towards her, had violent outbursts, and would beat her.

== Psychiatric hospital and art ==
When Bataille was around 40 years old, she is said to have started exhibiting signs of a mental disturbance. She was committed to Maison-Blanche and then sent to Ville-Évrard Psychiatric Hospital in Neuilly-sur-Marne, outside of Paris. During her time in the hospital, she made drawings and designed embroideries.

Bataille met the artist Jean Dubuffet at Ville-Évrard, during his first period of collecting art brut (outsider art) in psychiatric hospitals. They met several times at the hospital from 1948 to 1949, and she donated her works to him personally. Dubuffet then sent some of Bataille's small embroidered works to Alfonso A. Ossorio. In October 1949, her works were included in Dubuffet's art brut exhibition at the Galerie René Drouin.

== Artwork ==
Bataille only produced art for about three years, beginning in 1948. She created embroideries using silk, cotton, and thick wool, sewn onto rectangular pieces of cardboard. So her works could be hung, she attached pieces of string. She sometimes used strips of fabric or scraps. The subjects of Bataille's works were animals, gardens, buildings, and people. Her works were executed "in a simplified and often elliptical manner".

Bataille's embroideries have the character of paintings that are composed with thread, including the picture frame. Her nonuniform stitches go in all directions, yet evoke associations with the firm brushwork of painters. She used various thicknesses of wool for her compositions. Her works are sometimes unintelligible. She uses various sizes, though she tended towards works that measured around 15 x 25 cm. Many of Bataille's works depict buildings that are both linear and structurally dynamic. For continuous elements such as the facades of buildings and skies, the area is filled with flat colour, while elements like roofs and windows are given firm outlines. In 1948 and 1949, Bataille also composed drawings on cardboard or paper using pastels. The creative process for the figures she sketched resembled that of her embroideries, with expressive, bright colours and "short, firm strokes".

Bataille's works are held in the collections of the Lille Métropole Museum of Modern, Contemporary and Outsider Art and the Collection de l'art brut in Lausanne, Switzerland. Her works were exhibited at the Collection de l'art brut in Jean Dubuffet's Art Brut, the Origins of the Collection and Architecture. Her works were included in the 2015 exhibition Art Brut in America: The Incursions of Jean Dubuffet at the American Folk Art Museum in Manhattan. In a New York Times review of the exhibition, her wool embroideries were described as having the same "fractious energy" as some of the paintings of Frank Auerbach.

Bataille died on 16 June 1972 in Neuilly-sur-Marne. She was 76.

== Works ==
- Décor de nuit (1948), Collection de l'art brut, 8 x 7 1/8
- Un coin de bibliothèque (1948)
- Prince ancien à son tombeau (1949)
- Montmartre et la Moulin Rouge (1949), Collection de l'art brut, 20 1/2 x 13
- Vieille maison de Montmartre (1949)
- Argument d'un jardin mondial (c. 1951), Collection de l'art brut, 6 1/8 x 9 1/2
- L'Eden Casino de Berck-plage (1952)
