= Slow movement (culture) =

Social movement

- Years active: 1986–present
- Country: Global
- Major figures: Carlo Petrini, Geir Berthelsen, Carl Honoré
- Influences: Slow Food
- Influenced: Cittaslow, slow education, slow fashion, slow travel

The slow movement is a cultural initiative that advocates for a reduction in the pace of modern life, encouraging individuals to embrace a more thoughtful and deliberate approach to their daily activities.

It was an offshoot of the slow food movement, which began in 1986 as a protest led by Carlo Petrini against the opening of a McDonald's restaurant in Rome's Piazza di Spagna.

The key ideas of the slow movement include prioritizing quality over quantity, savoring the present moment, and fostering connections with people and the environment. It encourages a more intentional approach to daily activities, promoting sustainable practices and mindfulness. The movement spans various domains such as food, cities, education, fashion, and more, advocating for a balanced and holistic lifestyle that resists the fast-paced demands of modern society.

Initiatives linked to this movement include the Cittaslow organization to promote slowness in cities, most notably Rome, Naples, and Paris. Car-free days and banning Vespas to reduce urban noise are a few initiatives.

== Origins ==
The slow movement is a cultural movement which advocates slowing down the pace of human life. It emerged from the slow food movement, and Carlo Petrini's 1986 protest against the opening of a McDonald's restaurant in the Piazza di Spagna, Rome.

Geir Berthelsen's The World Institute of Slowness presented a vision in 1999 for a "slow planet".

In Carl Honoré's 2004 book, In Praise of Slow, he describes the slow movement as:

"a cultural revolution against the notion that faster is always better. The Slow philosophy is not about doing everything at a snail's pace. It's about seeking to do everything at the right speed. Savoring the hours and minutes rather than just counting them. Doing everything as well as possible, instead of as fast as possible. It's about quality over quantity in everything from work to food to parenting."

Norwegian professor Guttorm Fløistad summarises the philosophy, stating:

"The only thing for certain is that everything changes. The rate of change increases. If you want to hang on, you better speed up. That is the message of today. It could however be useful to remind everyone that our basic needs never change. The need to be seen and appreciated! It is the need to belong. The need for nearness and care, and for a little love! This is given only through slowness in human relations. In order to master changes, we have to recover slowness, reflection and togetherness. There we will find real renewal."

== Beliefs ==
=== Art ===
Slow Art Day was founded by Phil Terry and officially launched in 2009. During one day in April each year, museums and art galleries around the world host events focused on intentionally experiencing art through "slow looking". The movement aims to help people discover the joy of looking at art, typically through observing a painting or sculpture for 10–15 minutes, often followed by discussion. The Slow Art Day team publishes an Annual Report each year on its website, which features a range of events hosted by art institutions.

=== Ageing ===
Slow ageing (or slow aging) is a distinct approach to successful ageing, advocating a personal and holistic positive approach to the process of ageing. Established as part of the broader slow movement in the 1980s, as opposed to the interventionist-based and commercially backed medical anti-aging system, it involves personal ownership and non-medical intervention options in gaining potential natural life extension.

=== Cinema ===
Slow cinema is a cinematography style which derives from the art film genre. It aims to convey a sense of calculated slowness to the viewer. Slow films often consist of a resistance to movement and emotion, a lack of causality and a devotion to realism. This is usually obtained through the use of long takes, minimalist acting, slow or inexistent camera movements, unconventional use of music and sparse editing. Slow cinema directors include Béla Tarr, Lav Diaz, Nuri Bilge Ceylan, Abbas Kiarostami, Tsai Ming-liang, Andrei Tarkovsky and Theo Angelopoulos.

=== Cittaslow ===
Cittaslow International states its mission as "to enlarge the philosophy of Slow Food to local communities and to government of towns, applying the concepts of ecogastronomy at practice of everyday life". It seeks to improve the quality and enjoyment of living by encouraging happiness and self-determination. Cittaslow cities use the concept of globalization to prevent the impending globalization of their cities. Lisa Servon and Sarah Pink observe that, "The case of the Spanish Cittaslow towns offers a particular example of how towns can actively exploit the interpenetration of the global and the local. In these towns, a local–global relationship has emerged in ways that enable controlled development and the maintenance of local uniqueness."

=== Consumption ===
Tim Cooper, author of Longer Lasting Products, is a strong advocate of "slow consumption", and is quoted as saying, "The issue to address is what kind of economy is going to be sustainable in its wider sense, economically, environmentally and socially." Saul Griffith introduced "heirloom design" during a February Greener Gadgets conference in 2009. He notes a lasting design, the ability to repair, and the option of being modernized to advocate slow consumption. Legislation, alternative options, and consumer pressure can encourage manufacturers to design items in a more heirloom fashion.

=== Counseling ===
According to some, recent technological advances have resulted in a fast-paced style of living. Slow counselors understand that many clients are seeking ways to reduce stress and cultivate a more balanced approach to life. Developed by Dr. Randy Astramovich and Dr. Wendy Hoskins and rooted in the slow movement, slow counseling offers counselors a wellness focused foundation for addressing the time urgency and stress often reported by clients.

=== Conversation ===
According to Fast Company: "An unhurried conversation uses a simple process to allow people to take turns to speak without being interrupted. Everyone agrees at the start that only the person holding a chosen object (often a sugar bowl) is allowed to talk. Once the speaker has finished, they put the object down, signalling that they have said what they want to say. Someone else then picks up the object and takes their turn. Each speaker can respond to some or all of what the previous speaker said, or they can take the conversation in an entirely new direction."

Unhurried Conversations is a term used by the author of Unhurried at Work Johnnie Moore, about how people can work together at a speed that makes the most of their human qualities.

=== Democracy ===
Slow democracy describes local governance models that are inclusive, empowered, and centered on deliberative democracy.

Described by Susan Clark and Woden Teachout in their book Slow Democracy, the concept parallels the Slow Food movement's call for authenticity in food production, and highlights decision-making models based on authentic community involvement. Clark and Teachout note:

"Slow democracy is not a call for longer meetings or more time between decisions. Instead, it is a reminder of the care needed for full-blooded, empowered community decision making."

Examples of slow democracy include: Participatory Budgeting; the Swiss and New England (U.S.) town meeting; Dialogue to Change and Study Circles processes when connected with democratic action, such as the Portsmouth, New Hampshire "Portsmouth Listens" model; and many other participatory democracy models. The National Coalition for Dialogue and Deliberation serves as a network for many scholars and practitioners of slow democracy.

Slow democracy inspired the Living Room Conversations organization co-founded by Joan Blades, because slowing down to consider how we characterize "the other" is crucial to democratic engagement and to peacebuilding.

Harvard Law School professor Lawrence Lessig writes that, like slow food, slow democracy is:

"a strategy for resisting what we know would be most tempting but what we have learned is both empty and harmful. ... [T]he slow democracy movement says that we should do politics in particular contexts, not because those contexts can't be hacked or will never be poisonous, but because it's just harder to hack them or make them poisonous."

Scholars of dialogue and deliberation have expressed concern that increased online and face-to-face communication can lead to information overload, but incorporating slow democracy processes featuring listening and reflection can improve the experience. Proponents of community-led housing cite slow democracy as integral to their place-specific development efforts.

=== Education ===
As an alternative approach to modern faster styles of reading, such as speed reading, the concept of slow reading has been reintroduced as an educational branch of the slow movement. For instance, the ancient Greek method of slow reading known as Lectio, now known as Lectio Divina, has become a way of reading that encourages more in-depth analysis and a greater understanding of the text being read. Though the method is originally of Christian monastic origin, and has been used primarily as a tool to better understand the Bible, its technique can be applied in other areas of education besides the study of theology.

=== Fashion ===
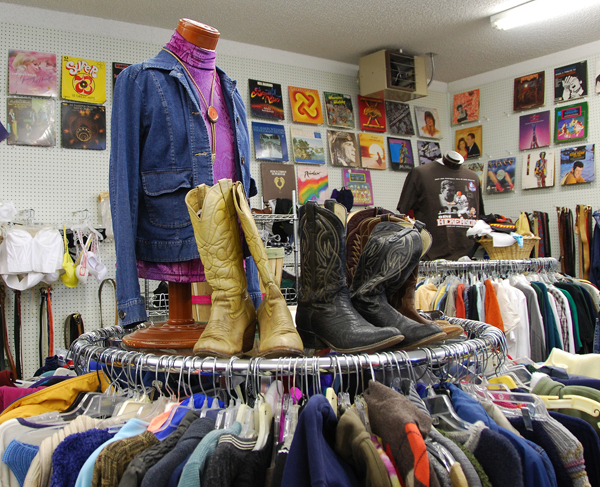
A thrift store, 2009. Shopping for secondhand clothing aligns with slow fashion beliefs.

The term slow fashion was coined by Kate Fletcher in 2007 (Centre for Sustainable Fashion, UK). "Slow fashion is not a seasonal trend that comes and goes like animal print, but a sustainable fashion movement that is gaining momentum."

The slow fashion style is based on the same principles of the slow food movement, as the alternative to mass-produced clothing (also known as fast fashion). Initially, the slow clothing movement was intended to reject all mass-produced clothing, referring only to clothing made by hand, but has broadened to include many interpretations and is practiced in various ways. Functional and fashion novelty drives consumers to replace their items faster, causing an increase of imported goods into the United States alone. It was reported by the Economic Policy Institute that in 2007, the U.S. imported six billion dollars' worth in fashion articles.

Some examples of slow fashion practices include:

- Opposing and boycotting mass-produced "fast fashion" or "McFashion"
- Choosing artisan products to support smaller businesses, fair trade and locally made clothes
- Buying secondhand or vintage clothing, and donating unwanted garments
- Choosing clothing made with sustainable, ethically made or recycled fabrics
- Choosing quality garments that will last longer, transcend trends (a "classic" style), and be repairable
- Doing it yourself: making, mending, customising, altering, and up-cycling one's own clothing
- Slowing the rate of fashion consumption: buying fewer clothes less often

The slow fashion ethos is related to the "sustainable", "eco", "green", and "ethical" fashion movements. It encourages education about the garment industry's connection with and impact on the environment, such as depleting resources, slowing of the supply chain to reduce the number of trends and seasons and to encourage quality production, and return greater value to garments, removing the image of disposability of fashion. Hazel Clark states there are "three lines of reflection: the valuing of local resources and distributed economies; transparent production systems with less intermediation between producer and consumer, and sustainable and sensorial products ..."

=== Food ===
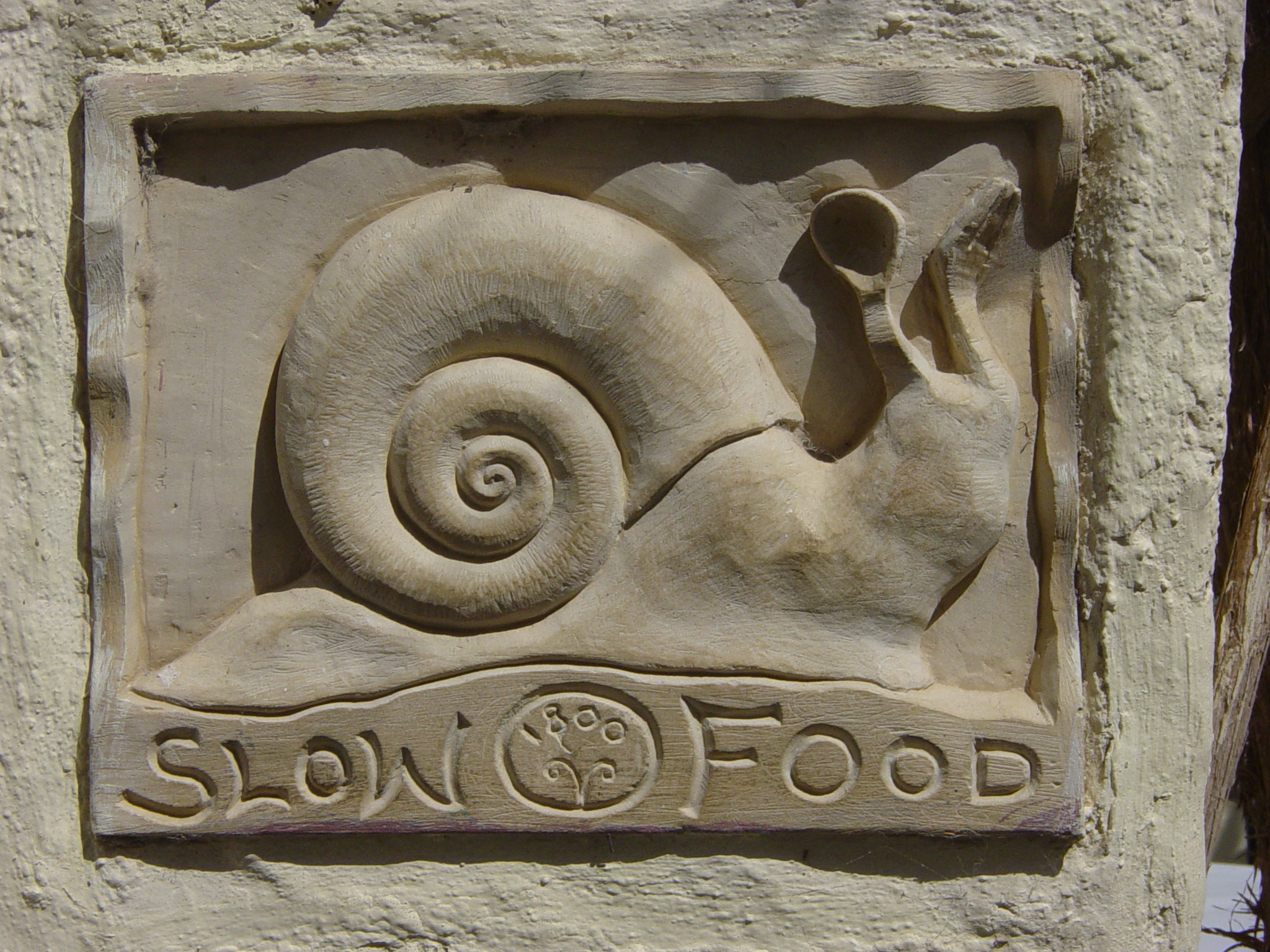
A slow food restaurant placard in Santorini, Greece

As opposed to the culture of fast food, the sub-movement known as slow food seeks to encourage the enjoyment of regional produce and traditional foods, which are often grown organically, and to enjoy these foods in the company of others. It aims to defend agricultural biodiversity.

The movement claims 83,000 members in 50 countries, which are organised into 800 Convivia or local chapters. Sometimes operating under a logo of a snail, the collective philosophy is to preserve and support traditional ways of life. Today, 42 states in the United States have their own convivium.

The movement, while widely celebrated for its emphasis on local, sustainable, and traditional food practices, has faced various criticisms. One significant critique is the potential elitism inherent in its approach. Slow Food's advocacy for artisanal and small-scale production often results in higher prices for its endorsed food products, which may limit the movement's accessibility to wealthier individuals. Founder Carlo Petrini himself has noted this issue, reflecting on his visit to a California farmers market where the clientele appeared predominantly wealthy.

Furthermore, Slow Food has been criticized for prioritizing hedonism over substantive political action. The movement's focus on pleasure, taste, and consumption patterns has led to accusations of it being more concerned with gastronomic enjoyment than with addressing broader political and economic injustices.

=== Gaming ===
Slow gaming is an approach to video games that is meant to be more slow-paced and more focused on challenging the assumptions and feelings of the player than on their skills and reflexes.

A "Slow Games Movement Manifesto" was written by Scottish game designer Mitch Alexander in September 2018, and a "Slow Gaming Manifesto" was independently published on Gamasutra by Polish game designer Artur Ganszyniec in June 2019.

Some games that can be considered examples of "slow gaming" include: Firewatch (2016), Heaven's Vault (2019), Journey (2012), Wanderlust Travel Stories (2019), and The Longing (2020).

=== Gardening ===
Slow gardening is an approach that helps gardeners savor what they grow using all their senses through all the seasons.

=== Goods ===
Slow goods takes its core direction from various elements of the overall slow movement, applying it to the conception, design and manufacturing of physical objects. Its key tenets are: low production runs, the use of craftspeople within the process, on-shore manufacturing, and smaller, local supply and service partners.

The rationale for this local engagement facilitates the assurance of quality, the revitalization of local manufacturing industries, and reduces greatly the footprint related to the shipment of goods across regions of land and/or water.

Physical goods affected by the slow movement represent much diversity, including slow architecture and building design. The slow movement is affecting the concept and planning stages of commercial buildings, chiefly LEED certified projects.

This movement seeks to break current conventions of perpetuating the disposable nature of mass production. By using higher-quality materials and craftsmanship, items attain a longer lifespan, similar to manufacturing eras in the past.

=== Living ===
Authors Beth Meredith and Eric Storm summarize slow living as follows:

Slow Living means structuring your life around meaning and fulfillment. Similar to "voluntary simplicity" and "downshifting", it emphasizes a less-is-more approach, focusing on the quality of your life. ... Slow Living addresses the desire to lead a more balanced life and to pursue a more holistic sense of well-being in the fullest sense of the word.

=== Marketing ===
Slow marketing is a reaction to the perceived "always-on" nature of digital marketing. It emphasizes a customer-centric outlook, sustainability, and ethics. It builds relationships with customers instead of encouraging immediate results, such as a limited time offer.

=== Media ===
Slow media and Slow television are movements aiming at sustainable and focused media production as well as media consumption. They formed in the context of a massive acceleration of news distribution ending in almost real-time digital media such as Twitter. Beginning in 2010, many local Slow Media initiatives formed in the USA and Europe (Germany, France, Italy) leading to a high attention in mass-media. Others experiment with a reduction of their daily media intake and log their efforts online ("slow media diet").

=== Medicine ===
Slow medicine fosters taking time in developing a relationship between the practitioner and the patient, and in applying medical knowledge, technology and treatment to the specific and unique character of the patient in his or her overall situation.

=== Money ===
Slow Money is a non-profit organization, founded to organize investors and donors to steer new sources of capital to small food enterprises, organic farms, and local food systems. Slow Money takes its name from the Slow Food movement. Slow Money aims to develop the relationship between capital markets and place, including social and soil fertility. It supports grass-roots mobilization through network building, convening, publishing, and incubating intermediary strategies and structures of funding.

=== Parenting ===
Slow parenting encourages parents to plan less for their children, allowing them to explore the world at their own pace. It is a response to hyper-parenting and helicopter parenting; the widespread trend for parents to schedule activities and classes after school every day and every weekend, to solve problems on behalf of the children, and to buy commercial services and products. It was described by Carl Honoré in Under Pressure: Rescuing Our Children from the Culture Of Hyper-Parenting.

=== Photography ===
The Slow photography movement prioritizes the process and experience of taking photos over mere documentation. It often involves film photography but can be applied using any camera. The movement emerged as a response to the ubiquity of digital photography and snapshot culture, emphasizing manual techniques and a deeper engagement with the physical materials of images.

David Campany defined the concept in his 2003 essay "Safety in Numbness: Some remarks on the problems of 'Late Photography.'" He used Joel Meyerowitz's post-9/11 photography, later published in Aftermath, to highlight the role of photography in public memory. Norwegian photographer Johanne Seines Svendsen, known for using long exposure times and the wetplate collodion process, exemplifies this technique. Her series "The Slow Photography" was showcased at the 67th North Norwegian Art Exhibition in 2013, featuring ambrotypes and alumitypes.

=== Religion ===
Slow church is a movement in Christian praxis which integrates slow-movement principles into the structure and character of the local church. The phrase was introduced in 2008 by Christian bloggers working independently who imagined what such a "slow church" might look like. Over the next several years, the concept continued to be discussed online and in print by various writers and ministers.

In July 2012, a three-day conference titled Slow Church: Abiding Together in the Patient Work of God was held on the campus of DePaul University in Chicago on the topic of slow church and featured Christian ethicist Stanley Hauerwas and Kyle Childress, among others. An online blog called "Slow Church" written by C. Christopher Smith and John Pattison is hosted by Patheos, and Smith and Pattison have written a book by the same name, published in June 2014.

Ethics, ecology, and economy are cited as areas of central concern to slow church. Smith describes slow church as a "conversation", not a movement, and has cited New Monasticism as an influence. In its emphases on non-traditional ways for churches to operate and on "conversation" over dogma and hierarchy, slow church is also related to the broader Christian "emerging church" movement.

=== Scholarship ===
Slow scholarship is a response to hasty scholarship and the demands of corporatized neoliberal academic culture, which may compromise the quality and integrity of research, education, and well-being. This movement attempts to counter the erosion of humanistic education, analyze the consequences of the culture of speed, and "explores alternatives to the fast-paced, metric-oriented neoliberal university through a slow-moving conversation on ways to slow down and claim time for slow scholarship and collective action."

=== Science ===
The slow science movement's objective is to enable scientists to take the time to think and read. The prevalent culture of science is publish or perish, where scientists are judged to be better if they publish more papers in less time, and only those who do so are able to maintain their careers. Those who practice and promote slow science suggest that "society should give scientists the time they need".

=== Technology ===
The slow technology approach aims to emphasize that technology can support reflection rather than efficiency. This approach has been discussed through various examples, for example those in interaction design or virtual environments. It is related to other parallel efforts such as those towards reflective design, critical design, and critical technical practice.

=== Thought (philosophy) ===
Slow thought calls for a slow philosophy to ease thinking into a more playful and porous dialogue about what it means to live. Vincenzo Di Nicola's "Slow Thought Manifesto" elucidates and illuminates Slow thought through seven proclamations, published and cited in English, Indonesian, Italian, and Portuguese, and frequently cited in French:

1. Slow thought is marked by peripatetic Socratic walks, the face-to-face encounter of Emmanuel Levinas, and Mikhail Bakhtin's dialogic conversations
2. Slow thought creates its own time and place
3. Slow thought has no other object than itself
4. Slow thought is porous
5. Slow thought is playful
6. Slow thought is a counter-method, rather than a method, for thinking as it relaxes, releases, and liberates thought from its constraints and the trauma of tradition
7. Slow thought is deliberate

Notable slow thinkers include Mahatma Gandhi who affirmed that, "There is more to life than simply increasing its speed", Giorgio Agamben (on the philosophy of childhood), Walter Benjamin (on the porosity of Naples), and Johan Huizinga (on play as an interlude in our daily lives). Di Nicola's Slow Thought Manifesto is featured in Julian Hanna's The Manifesto Handbook as a reaction against acceleration, "elucidating seven principles, including the practice of being 'asynchronous' or resisting the speed of modern times in favor of the 'slow logic of thought' and working toward greater focus". The Slow Thought Manifesto is being cited in philosophy, information science, and peacebuilding politics.

"Take your time", the slogan of Slow Thought, cited by Di Nicola, is taken from philosopher Ludwig Wittgenstein, himself a slow thinker:

"In a wonderful philosophical lesson that is structured like a joke, Wittgenstein admonished philosophers about rushing their thinking:

Question: 'How does one philosopher address another?'

Answer: 'Take your time.'"

=== Time poverty ===
The principal perspective of the slow movement is to experience life in a fundamentally different way. Adherents believe that the experience of being present leads to what Abraham Maslow refers to as peak experience.

The International Institute of Not Doing Much is a humorous approach to the serious topic of "time poverty", incivility, and workaholism. The Institute's fictional presence promotes counter-urgency. First created in 2005, SlowDownNow.org is a continually evolving work of art and humor which reports it has over 6,000 members.

=== Travel ===
Slow travel is an evolving movement that has taken its inspiration from nineteenth-century European travel writers, such as Théophile Gautier, who reacted against the cult of speed, prompting some modern analysts to ask, "If we have slow food and slow cities, then why not slow travel?". Other literary and exploration traditions, from early Arab travelers to late nineteenth-century Yiddish writers, have also identified with slow travel, usually marking its connection with community as its most distinctive feature. Espousing modes of travel that were the norm in some less developed societies became, for some writers and travelers from western Europe such as Isabelle Eberhardt, a way of engaging more seriously with those societies.

Slow travel is not only about traveling from one place to another, it is also about immersing oneself in a destination. It consists of staying in the same place for a while to develop a deep connection with it. Frequenting local places, spending time with locals and discovering their habits and customs can turn a regular trip into a slow travel experience. The key is to take one's time and to let oneself be carried along.

Advocates of slow travel argue that all too often the potential pleasure of the journey is lost by too-eager anticipation of arrival. Slow travel, it is asserted, is a state of mind which allows travelers to engage more fully with communities along their route, often favoring visits to spots enjoyed by local residents rather than merely following guidebooks. As such, slow travel shares some common values with ecotourism. Its advocates and devotees generally look for low-impact travel styles, even to the extent of eschewing flying. The future of Slow Travel is aiming toward reducing greenhouse gas emissions by reducing car and air travel because the rate we are using planes and cars is not sustainable for our atmosphere. Advocates believe that the combination of environmental awareness and cost efficient traveling will move people towards Slow Travel.

Aspects of slow travel, including some of the principles detailed in the "Manifesto for Slow Travel", are now increasingly featured in travel writing. The magazine Hidden Europe, which first published the "Manifesto for Slow Travel", has particularly showcased slow travel, featuring articles that focus on unhurried, low-impact journeys, and advocating a stronger engagement with visited communities.

A new book series launched in May 2010 by Bradt Travel Guides explicitly espouses slow travel ideas with volumes that focus very much on local communities within a tightly defined area, often advocating the use of public transport along the way. Titles include Bus-pass Britain, Slow Norfolk and Suffolk, Slow Devon and Exmoor, Slow Cotswolds, Slow North Yorkshire, and Slow Sussex and South Downs National Park.

== Criticism ==
Despite its positive intentions, the slow movement faces criticism for its potential elitism and inaccessibility. Critics argue that the movement's emphasis on artisanal and small-scale production can result in higher costs, making it difficult for individuals with lower incomes to participate. Additionally, some view the movement as overly idealistic and impractical in the context of the fast-paced realities of modern life. There are concerns that it may prioritize personal enjoyment and aesthetic values over addressing broader social and economic issues.

== See also ==
- African time
- Critique of work
- Degrowth
- Downshifting (lifestyle)
- Durable good
- Patience
- Product tracing systems, which allow people to see the source factory of a product
- Simple living
- Sleep tourism
- Slow architecture
- Slow living
- Universal basic income
- Work-life balance
