= In Praise of Slow =

2004 book by Carl Honoré

- Author: Carl Honoré
- Original title: In Praise of Slow
- Language: English
- Genre: Current Events
- Publisher: HarperSanFrancisco
- Publication date: 2004
- Publication place: United States
- Media type: Print
- Pages: 310
- ISBN: 0-06-054578-X
- OCLC: 55495224
- LC Class: BJ1498 .H66 2004
- Website: inpraiseofslow.com

In Praise of Slow (U.S. title In Praise of Slowness: Challenging the Cult of Speed) is a book by Carl Honoré containing his analysis of the "Cult of Speed", which he claims is becoming the societal standard all over the world. He discusses and gives praise to the Slow Movement and the various groups around the world representative of this movement.
