= Tiger mother (disambiguation) =

A tiger mother is a term for a strict or demanding mother who controls her children and pushes them to be academically successful.

Tiger mother (or tiger mom) may also refer to:

== Literature ==
- Battle Hymn of the Tiger Mother, the 2011 book by Amy Chua that popularised the term

== Television shows ==
- Tiger Mom (TV series), a 2015 Chinese series
- Tiger Mom Blues, a 2017 Hong Kong series
- Tiger Mum, a 2014–2015 Singaporean series

== See also ==
- Authoritarian parenting, a restrictive, punishment-heavy parenting style
- Helicopter parent, a parent who pays extremely close attention to a child's or children's experiences and problems
- Hong Kong Kids phenomenon, referring to children who are regarded as spoilt and overly dependent
- Jewish mother, a stereotype of a nagging mother or wife
- Kyōiku mama, a Japanese "education mum"
- Stage mother, sometimes used as a negative stereotype
