= Parenting styles =

Psychological construct

A parenting style is a pattern of behaviors, attitudes, and approaches that a parent uses when interacting with and raising their child. The study of parenting styles is based on the idea that parents differ in their patterns of parenting and that these patterns can have an impact on their children's development and well-being. Parenting styles are distinct from specific parenting practices, since they represent broader patterns of practices and attitudes that create an emotional climate for the child. Parenting styles also encompass the ways in which parents respond to and make demands on their children, and it could be related to Hamilton's rule of benefit and cost.

Children go through many different stages throughout their childhood. Parents create their own parenting styles from a combination of factors that evolve over time. The parenting styles are subject to change as children begin to develop their own personalities. Parents may also change their parenting style between children, so siblings may be raised with different parenting styles. During the stage of infancy, parents try to adjust to a new lifestyle in terms of adapting and bonding with their new infant. Developmental psychologists distinguish between the relationship between the child and parent, which ideally is one of attachment, and the relationship between the parent and child, referred to as bonding. In the stage of adolescence, parents encounter new challenges, such as adolescents seeking and desiring freedom.

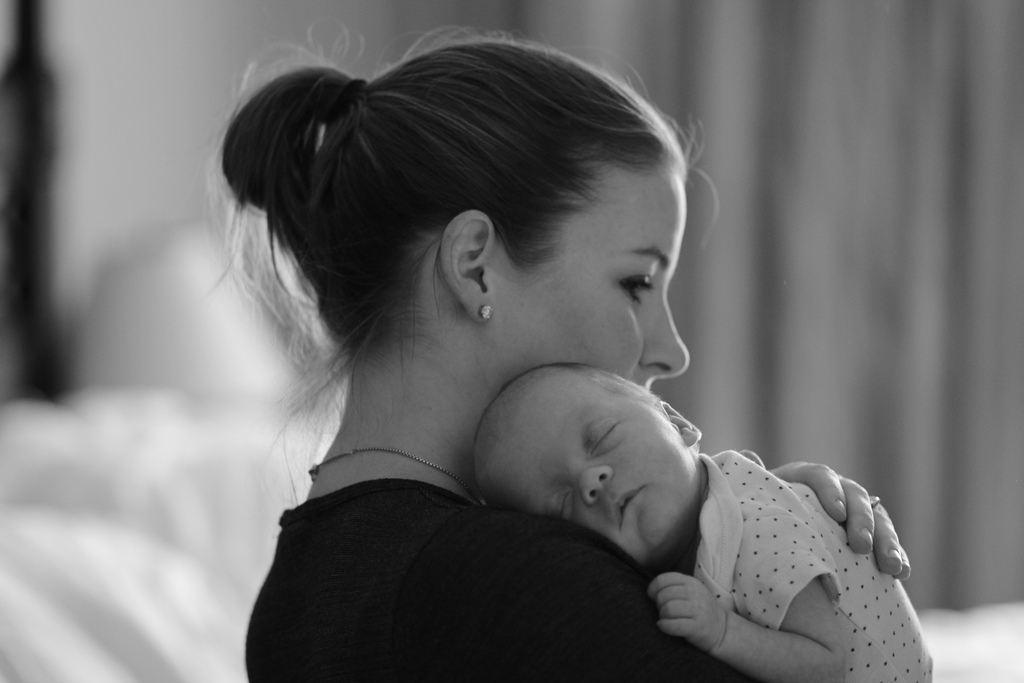
Mother holding an infant child

A child's temperament and parents' cultural patterns have an influence on the kind of parenting style a child may receive. The parenting styles that parents experience as children also influences the parenting styles they choose to use.

Early researchers studied parenting along a range of dimensions, including levels of responsiveness, democracy, emotional involvement, control, acceptance, dominance, and restrictiveness. In the 1960s, Diana Baumrind created a typology of three parenting styles, which she labeled as authoritative, authoritarian and permissive (or indulgent). She characterized the authoritative style as an ideal balance of control and autonomy. This typology became the dominant classification of parenting styles, often with the addition of a fourth category of indifferent or neglectful parents. Baumrind's typology has been criticized as containing overly broad categorizations and an imprecise and overly idealized description of authoritative parenting. Later researchers on parenting styles returned to focus on parenting dimensions and emphasized the situational nature of parenting decisions.

Some early researchers found that children raised in a democratic home environment were more likely to be aggressive and exhibit leadership skills, while those raised in a controlled environment were more likely to be quiet and non-resistant. Contemporary researchers have emphasized that love and nurturing children with care and affection encourage positive physical and mental progress in children. They have also argued that additional developmental skills result from positive parenting styles, including maintaining a close relationship with others, being self-reliant, and being independent.

Contemporary research also emphasizes that parenting styles interact with biological, social, and cultural factors and that development is shaped by different environmental and individual characteristics rather than just parenting style.

== Distinction with parenting practices ==
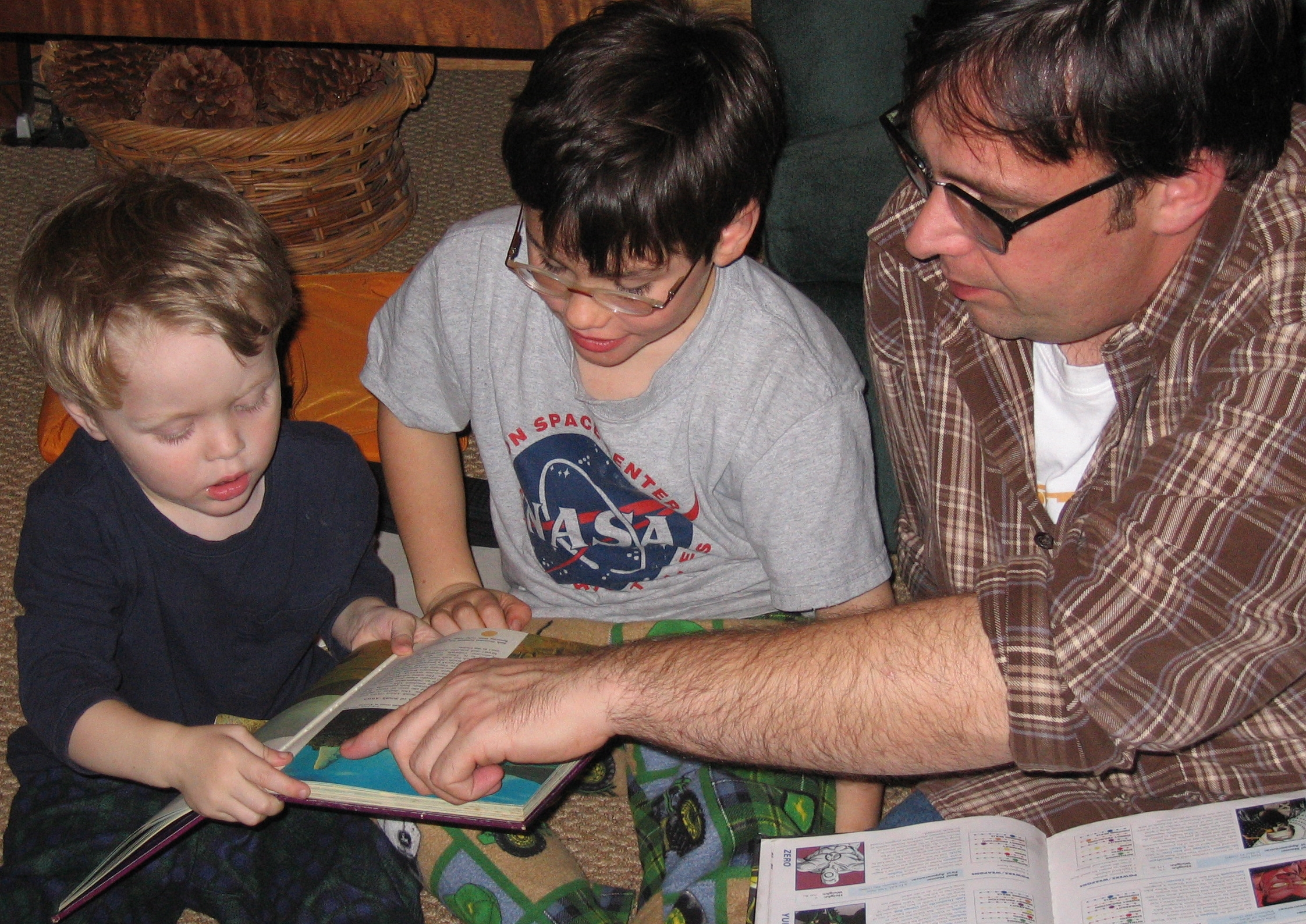
Father and children reading

According to a literature review by Christopher Spera (2005), Darling and Steinberg (1993) suggest that it is important to understand the differences between parenting styles and parenting practices: "Parenting practices are defined as specific behaviors that parents use to socialize their children", while parenting style is "the emotional climate in which parents raise their children."

Studies have identified parenting practices that are associated with differences in child outcomes. Some of the practices shown to be associated with child outcomes include: Support, Engagement, Warmth, Recognition, Control, Monitoring, and Severe punishment. Parenting practices such as parental support, supervision, and strict boundaries appear to be associated with higher school grades, fewer behavioral problems, and better mental health. These components have no age limit and can start in preschool all the way through college.

== Theories of child rearing ==
Beginning in the 17th century, two philosophers independently wrote works that have been widely influential in child-rearing. John Locke's 1693 book Some Thoughts Concerning Education is a well-known foundation for educational pedagogy from a Puritan standpoint. Locke highlights the importance of experiences to a child's development and recommends developing their physical habits first. In 1762, the French philosopher Jean-Jacques Rousseau published a volume on education, Emile: or, On Education. He proposed that early education should be derived less from books and more from a child's interactions with the world. Among them, Rousseau is more in line with slow parenting, and Locke is more for concerted cultivation.

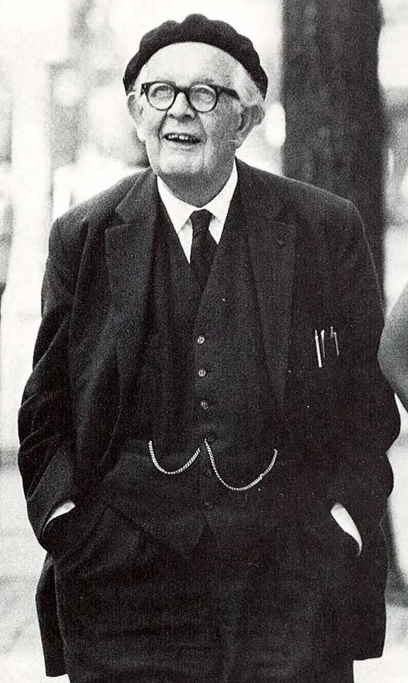
Jean Piaget

Jean Piaget's theory of cognitive development describes how children represent and reason about the world. This is a developmental stage theory that consists of a Sensorimotor stage, Preoperational stage, Concrete operational stage, and Formal operational stage. Piaget was a pioneer in the field of child development and psychology and continues to influence parents, educators, and other theorists with a significant effect on science.

Erik Erikson, a developmental psychologist, proposed eight life stages through which each person must develop. In order to move through the eight stages, there is a crisis that must occur. Then there is a new dilemma that encourages the growth through the next stage. In each stage, they must understand and balance two conflicting forces, and so parents might choose a series of parenting styles that helps each child as appropriate at each stage. The first five of his eight stages occur in childhood: The virtue of hope requires balancing trust with mistrust, and typically occurs from birth to one year old. Will balances autonomy with shame and doubt around the ages of two to three. Purpose balances initiative with guilt around the ages of four to six years. Competence balances industry against inferiority around ages seven to 12. Fidelity contrasts identity with role confusion, in ages 13 to 19. The remaining adult virtues are love, care, and wisdom.

Rudolf Dreikurs believed that pre-adolescent children's misbehavior was caused by their unfulfilled wish to be a member of a social group. He argued that they then act out a sequence of four mistaken goals: first, they seek attention. If they do not get it, they aim for power, then revenge and finally feel inadequate. This theory is used in education as well as parenting, forming a valuable theory upon which to manage misbehavior. Other parenting techniques should also be used to encourage learning and happiness. He emphasized the significance to establish a democratic family style that adopts a method of periodic democratic family councils while averting punishment. He advances "logical and natural consequences" that teach children to be responsible and understand the natural consequences of proper rules of conduct and improper behavior.

Frank Furedi is a sociologist with a particular interest in parenting and families. He believes that the actions of parents are less decisive than others claim. He describes the term infant determinism as the determination of a person's life prospects by what happens to them during infancy, arguing that there is little or no evidence for its truth. While commercial, governmental, and other interests constantly try to guide parents to do more and worry more for their children, he believes that children are capable of developing well in almost any circumstances. Furedi quotes Steve Petersen of Washington University in St. Louis: "development really wants to happen. A very poor environment is needed to interfere with development... [just] do not raise your child in a closet, starve them, or hit them on the head with a frying pan". Similarly, the journalist Tim Gill has expressed concern about excessive risk aversion by parents and those responsible for children in his book No Fear. This aversion limits the opportunities for children to develop sufficient adult skills, particularly in dealing with risk, but also in performing adventurous and imaginative activities.

In 1998, independent scholar Judith Rich Harris published The Nurture Assumption, in which she argued that scientific evidence, particularly from the field of behavioral genetics, showed that parenting styles generally do not have significant effects on children's development, except in cases of severe child abuse or child neglect. She proposed that children turn out the way they do primarily due to two alternative reasons: genetic effects, and social group effects associated with the children's peer groups. She said that the purported effects of different forms of parenting can instead be attributed to heredity, the culture at large, and children's own influence on how their parents treat them. Harris was criticized for taking the point of "parental upbringing seems to matter less than previously thought" and misleadingly implying that "parents do not matter." Harris never actually claimed parents do not matter, but it was feared that the message would be misinterpreted by lay readers.

Despite Harris's arguments, some recent studies suggest that parents can influence the outcomes of their children. For example, one study found that the personality traits of parents are better predictors of the outcomes of their children than those of the children. Other recent studies seem to indicate that parenting does have impacts on adoptive children as well. For example, one study found that children adopted by parents who reported warm parenting at 21 months postplacement tended to have lower levels of internalizing and externalizing problems at 3 years postplacement. However, the study was unable to fully explore whether the parenting style was influenced by the child's characteristics. Another study similarly showed that warm adoptive parenting at 27 months predicted lower levels of child externalizing problems at ages 6 and 7, but also was unable to rule out the possibility that this association was due to the child's effect on the parents rather than the parents' effect on the child.

=== Baumrind's parenting typology ===
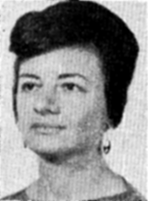
Diana Baumrind

Diana Baumrind is a researcher who focused on the classification of parenting styles into what is now known as Baumrind's parenting typology. She found what she considered to be the four basic elements that could help shape successful parenting: responsiveness vs. unresponsiveness and demanding vs. undemanding. Parental responsiveness refers to the degree to which the parent responds to the child's needs in a supportive and accepting manner. Parental demandingness refers to the rules which the parent has in place for their child's behavior, the expectations for their children to comply with these rules, and the level of repercussions that follow if those rules are broken. Baumrind identified three initial parenting styles: Authoritative parenting, authoritarian parenting and permissive parenting. Maccoby and Martin expanded upon Baumrind's three original parenting styles by placing parenting styles into two distinct categories: demanding and undemanding. With these distinctions, four new parenting styles were defined:

Maccoby and Martin's Four Parenting Styles Baumrind's Three Parenting Styles
	Demanding	Undemanding
Responsive	Authoritative/Propagative	Indulgent (Permissive)
Unresponsive	Authoritarian/Totalitarian	Neglectful

Baumrind believes that parents should be neither punishing nor apathetic. Instead, they should make rules for their children and be affectionate with them. These parenting styles are designed to describe normal changes in parenting, rather than abnormal parenting, such as might be observed in abusive families. In addition, parenting stress can often cause changes in parental behavior such as inconsistency, increased negative communication, decreased monitoring and/or supervision, setting vague rules or limits on behavior, being more reactive and less proactive, and engaging in increasingly harsh disciplinary behaviors.

Chandler, Heffer, and Turner argue that parenting styles are associated with adolescent psychological and behavioral problems and may affect academic performance.

==== The four styles ====
The four styles include Authoritative, Authoritarian, Neglectful, and Indulgent/Permissive. Each style has been explained based on the definition and is elaborated considering demandingness and responsiveness.

===== Authoritative =====
The parent is demanding and responsive.

When this style is systematically developed, it grows to fit the descriptions propagative parenting, democratic parenting, positive parenting, and concerted cultivation.

Authoritative parenting is characterized by a child-centered approach that holds high expectations of maturity. Authoritative parents can understand how their children are feeling and teach them how to regulate their feelings. Even with high expectations of maturity, authoritative parents are usually forgiving of any possible shortcomings. They often help their children to find appropriate outlets to solve problems. Authoritative parents encourage children to be independent but still place limits on their actions. Extensive verbal give-and-take is not refused, and parents try to be warm and nurturing toward the child. Authoritative parents are not usually as controlling as authoritarian parents, allowing the child to explore more freely, thus having them make their own decisions based upon their own reasoning. Often, authoritative parents produce children who are more independent and self-reliant. Authoritative parenting styles are mainly produced in the context of high parental responses and high demands.

Authoritative parents will set clear standards for their children, monitor the limits that they set, and also allow children to develop autonomy. They also expect mature, independent, and age-appropriate behavior of children. Punishments for misbehavior are measured and consistent, not arbitrary or violent. Often, behaviors are not punished; instead, the natural consequences of the child's actions are explored and discussed—allowing the child to see that the behavior is inappropriate and not to be repeated, rather than merely not repeated to avoid adverse consequences. Authoritative parents set limits and demand maturity, and when punishing a child, authoritative parents are more likely to explain their reason for punishment. In some cases, this may lead to more understanding and compliant behavior from the child. A child knows why they are being punished because an authoritative parent makes the reasons known. As a result, children of authoritative parents are more likely to be successful, well-liked by those around them, generous, and capable of self-determination.

===== Authoritarian =====
The parent is demanding but not responsive.

Authoritarian parenting is a restrictive, punishment-heavy parenting style in which parents make their children follow their directions with little to no explanation or feedback and focus on the child's and family's perception and status. Corporal punishment, such as spanking, and yelling are a form of discipline often preferred by authoritarian parents. The goal of this style, at least when well-intentioned, is to teach the child to behave, survive, and thrive as an adult in a harsh and unforgiving society by preparing the child for negative responses, such as anger and aggression, that the child will face if their behavior is inappropriate. In addition, advocates of the authoritarian style often believe that the shock of aggression from someone from the outside world will affect children less because they are accustomed to both acute and chronic stress imposed by parents.

Authoritarian parenting has distinctive effects on children:

- Children raised using this type of parenting may have less social competence because the parent generally tells the child what to do instead of allowing the child to choose by themselves, making the child appear to excel in the short term but limiting development in ways that are increasingly revealed as supervision and opportunities for direct parental control decline.
- Children raised by authoritarian parents tend to be conformist, highly obedient, quiet, and not very happy. These children often experience depression and self-blame.

- For some children raised by authoritarian parents, these behaviors continue into adulthood.
- Children who are resentful of or angry about being raised in an authoritarian environment but have managed to develop high behavioral self-confidence often rebel in adolescence and/or young adulthood.
- Children who experience anger and resentment coupled with the downsides of both inhibited self-efficacy and high self-blame often retreat into escapist behaviors, including but not limited to substance abuse, and are at heightened risk for suicide.

- Specific aspects of authoritarian styles prevalent among certain cultures and ethnic groups, most notably aspects of traditional Asian child-rearing practices sometimes described as authoritarian, often continued by Asian American families and sometimes emulated by intensive parents from other cultures, may be associated with more positive median child outcomes than Baumrind's model predicts, albeit at the risk of exacerbated downside outcomes exemplified by Asian cultural phenomena such as hikikomori and the heightened suicide rates found in South Korea, in India and by international observers of China before 2014.
- Many Non-Western parents tend to have more of an Authoritarian parenting style rather than Authoritative because adult figures are generally more highly respected in other countries. Children are expected to comply with their parents' rules without question. This is a common critique of Baumrind's Three Parenting Styles because Authoritarian parenting is generally associated with negative outcomes, however, many other cultures are considered to use an Authoritarian parenting style, and it is considered in those cultures not to negatively affect the child.

Recents studies have continued to find results that authoritative parenting is associated with positive developmental outcomes, including stronger emotional regulation, high academic achievement, better wellbeing, and lower anxiety rates. Researchers suggest these outcomes may result from a combination of consistent boundaries, high expectations and emotional support that characterizes authoritative parenting.

===== Indulgent or permissive =====
The parent is responsive but not demanding.

Indulgent parenting, also called permissive, non-directive, lenient, libertarian, or (by supporters) anti-authoritarian, is characterized as having few behavioral expectations for the child. "Indulgent parenting is a style of parenting in which parents are very involved with their children but place few demands or controls on them". Parents are nurturing and accepting, and they are responsive to the child's needs and wishes. Indulgent parents do not require children to regulate themselves or behave appropriately. As adults, children of indulgent parents will pay less attention to avoiding behaviors that cause aggression in others.

Permissive parents try to be "friends" with their child and do not play a parental role. The expectations of the child are very low, and there is little discipline. Permissive parents also allow children to make their own decisions, giving them advice as a friend. This type of parenting is very lax, with few punishments or rules. Permissive parents also tend to give their children whatever they want and hope that they are appreciated for their accommodating style. Other permissive parents compensate for what they missed as children, and as a result, give their children both the freedom and materials that they lacked in their childhood. Baumrind's research on pre-school children with permissive parents found that the children were immature, lacked impulse control, and were irresponsible.

Children of permissive parents may tend to be more impulsive and as adolescents may engage more in misconduct such as drug use, "Children never learn to control their own behavior and always expect to get their way." But in other cases, they are emotionally secure, independent, and are willing to learn and accept defeat. They mature quickly and are able to live life without the help of someone else.

From a 2014 study, the teens least prone to heavy drinking had parents who scored high on both accountability and warmth. So-called 'indulgent' parents, those low on accountability and high on warmth, nearly tripled the risk of their teen participating in heavy drinking. In contrast, 'strict parents' or authoritarian parents—high on accountability and low on warmth—more than doubled their teens' risk of heavy drinking.

===== Neglectful or uninvolved =====
The parent is not responsive and not demanding.

Neglectful parenting, also known as uninvolved, detached, dismissive, or hands-off parenting, is characterized by a lack of warmth and control. Neglectful parents are unaware of what their children are doing, and if they find out, they feel indifferent towards them. They may provide basic necessities such as food, shelter, and clothing, but they do not indulge their children's emotions or opinions. This leaves children feeling as if their parents' lives are more important than their own. Sometimes parents can be neglectful because of stressors they are experiencing in their own life.

Children of neglectful parents, also sometimes known as latchkey parents, are often lonely, sad, immature, and have a difficult time to adapting to social norms. They are more likely to end up in abusive relationships, perform risky behaviors, and have increased rates of injury. They can also struggle with low self-esteem and emotional neediness, which may be caused from children being left alone throughout their younger years. They are also at a risk of developing depression.

Neglectful parenting has a significant impact on educational performance. A 2013 study involving 1000 Indian students showed that children raised under this parenting style—about one-fourth of the subjects—consistently score lower in all subject areas, regardless of their gender or education boards. Lack of parental involvement and emotional support often leads these children to develop a sense of emotional detachment, mistrust of authority figures, and patterns of delinquency during adolescence, because they might feel that no one is monitoring them. These children might still get along well with their peers.

==== Cultural effects on children ====
Most studies, mainly in English-speaking countries, show that children of authoritative parents have the best outcomes in different domains (behavioral, psychological and social adjustment...). The case might be different, however, for Asian populations, where the authoritarian style was found as good as the authoritative style. On the other hand, some studies have found a superiority of the indulgent style in Spain, Portugal or Brazil, but the methodology of these studies has been contested. More recently a study has shown that in Spain, while using the same questionnaire used in other countries, the authoritative style continues to be the best one for children. Furthermore, a systematic review has shown that the results do not depend on the culture but on the instruments used: studies measuring control as coercion find a detrimental effect of such control on adolescents, and better outcomes for children of permissive parents; however, when behavioral control is measured, such control is positive, and authoritative parents get the best results.

Recent cross cultural research suggests that the relationship between child outcomes and parenting styles is influenced by social an cultural norms. In one culture some parenting styles may be considered authoritarian, while in another culture it can be seen as caring or being involved.Therefore, researchers have argued that parenting styles should be understood within their cultural context rather than evaluated according to Western parenting examples. Studies also suggest that parental warmth and emotional support are consistently associated with positive developmental outcomes across many different cultures even when there's differing levels of behavioral control.

==== Criticism of Baumrind's typology ====
Baumrind's typology has received significant criticism for containing overly broad categorizations and an imprecise and overly idealized description of authoritative parenting.

Author Alfie Kohn argued that Baumrind's "favored approach [of authoritative parenting], supposedly a blend of firmness and caring, is actually quite traditional and control-oriented," adding that the typology serves to "blur the differences between 'permissive' parents who were really just confused and those who were deliberately democratic." Kohn's preferred approach is anti-authoritarian but also encourages respectful adult guidance and unconditional love, an approach which is not accounted for in Baumrind's typology.

Dr. Wendy Grolnick has critiqued Baumrind's use of the term "firm control" in her description of authoritative parenting and argued that there should be clear differentiation between coercive power assertion (which is associated with negative effects on children) and the more positive roles of structure and high expectations.

Catherine C. Lewis argued that the empirical research on authoritative parenting did not sufficiently account for the possibility that positive effects associated with parental control emerged from the child's willingness to obey rather than the parent's tendency to exercise control. Lewis also argued that the studies did not sufficiently separate the effects of firm control from the effects of other parenting practices that tend to accompany it. Therefore, it is possible for the child's outcomes to be attributed to those accompanying parenting practices rather than to the measure of firm control.

More recent developmental research has emphasized that parenting exists on a continuum rather than in fixed categories. More frequently researchers increasingly examine parenting dimensions like warmth, responsiveness, autonomy support, and behavioral control independently because parents often display characteristics associated with different parenting styles. This approach reflects the complexity of a parent-child relationship and shows how parenting behaviors may differ across situations and child development stages.

== Attachment theory ==
Attachment theory was created by John Bowlby and Mary Ainsworth. This theory focuses on the attachment of parents and children (specifically through infancy), and the aspect of children staying in close distance with their caregiver who will protect them from the outside world. The bond that is created between child and mother is a vital part of how the child will grow up. Attachment between a mother and her child can be seen by the "child's cry's, their smiles and if they cling to their mother", babies also turn to these attachment techniques when they feel unsafe, scared, or confused. However, when the stress is gone, and they know they are safe due to that relationship, the infant or child can then engage in activities to strengthen how they explore and view the world around them.

This theory includes the possible types of attachment:

- Secure attachment is when the child feels comfortable exploring their environment when their caregiver is not there, but uses them as a base for comfort and security if they become frightened.
- Insecure attachment is when the child is hesitant to explore the environment on their own, and displays reluctance in accepting comfort from their parent.

=== Attachment theory in adolescence ===
Although research on attachment theory has focused on infancy and early childhood, research has shown that the relationship between teens and their parents can be affected depending on whether they have a secure or insecure attachment between them. A parent's interaction with their child during infancy creates an internal working model of attachment, which is the development of expectations that a child has for future relationships and interactions based on the interactions they had during infancy with their caregiver. If an adolescent continues to have a secure attachment with their caregiver, they are more likely to talk to their guardian about their problems and concerns, have stronger interpersonal relationships with friends and significant others, and also have higher self-esteem. Parents continue to maintain a secure attachment through adolescence by expressing understanding, good communication skills, and allowing their children to safely start doing things independently.

== Other parenting styles ==
=== Attachment parenting ===
Attachment parenting is a parenting philosophy that proposes methods aiming to promote the attachment of mother and infant not only by maximal parental empathy and responsiveness but also by continuous bodily closeness and touch. Attachment in psychology is defined as "a lasting emotional bond between people". Attachment parenting style is based on psychological attachment theory. This theory identifies four main types of attachment: secure, avoidant, anxious, and disorganized attachment. The term attachment parenting was coined by the American pediatrician William Sears. Important principles are: bonding at birth, breastfeeding, carrying the baby on your body, co-sleeping and "reading" the crying of the baby.

=== Child-centered parenting ===
Child-centered parenting is a parenting style advocated by Blythe and David Daniel, which focuses on the real needs and the unique person-hood of each child. Some psychologists have argued that child-centered parenting is difficult to get right.

=== Positive parenting ===
Positive parenting is a parenting style that generally overlaps with authoritative parenting and is defined by consistent support and guidance throughout developmental stages.

Concerted Cultivation is a specific form of positive parenting characterized by parents' attempts to foster their child's talents through organized extracurricular activities such as music lessons, sports/athletics, and academic enrichment.

=== Narcissistic parenting ===
A narcissistic parent is a parent affected by narcissism or narcissistic personality disorder. Typically narcissistic parents are exclusively and possessively close to their children and may be especially envious of, and threatened by, their child's growing independence. The result may be what has been termed a pattern of narcissistic attachment, with the child considered to exist solely for the parent's benefit. Narcissistic parents typically form dysfunctional parent-child relationships and can be abusive or neglectful, or both. Behavioral issues and self esteem issues are more common for children raised by a narcissistic parent. People who were raised by a narcissistic parent may experience emotional neglect which puts them at a higher risk of several health issues like anxiety and depression. Parents who are narcissistic in their parenting will be involved in some if not all of these traits:

- self-importance
- no respect for boundaries
- communication as warfare
- gaslighting
- playing the victim
- abusive behavior/ neglect

=== Nurturant parenting ===
Nurturant parenting is defined by characteristics of being responsive and empathetic. It is a family model where children are expected to explore their surroundings with protection from their parents. This style of parenting is encouraging and helps offer development opportunities for a child and their temperaments. A child's self-image, social skills, and academic performance will improve, impacting how they will grow up to be mature, happy, well-balanced adults. It has been found that when families have low levels of nurturant-involved parenting the youth are more likely to get involved with illegal substances and underage drinking. This is an example of how powerful parenting styles are and the impact it has on children. Nurturant parenting is a warm and supportive environment for the children and there is a lack of hostility and rejection from the parents toward their kids.

=== Overparenting ===
Overparenting is parents who try to involve themselves in every aspect of their child's life, often attempting to solve all their problems and stifling the child's ability to act independently or solve their own problems. A helicopter parent is a colloquial early 21st-century term for a parent who pays extremely close attention to their children's experiences and problems and attempts to sweep all obstacles out of their paths, particularly at educational institutions. Overparenting limits a child's autonomy and essential development for independence. Helicopter parents are so named because they hover overhead like a helicopter, especially from late adolescence to early adulthood, during which time developing independence and self-sufficiency is critical to future success. Modern communication technology has facilitated this style, allowing parents to monitor their children through cell phones, email and online monitoring of academic performance.

=== Affectionless control ===
The affectionless control parental style combines a lack of warmth and caring (low parental care) with over-control (such as parental criticism, and intrusiveness). This has been linked to children's anxiety and to dysfunctional attitudes and low self-esteem in the children, although it is not necessarily the cause. There is evidence that parental affectionless control is associated with suicidal behavior.

=== Slow parenting ===
Slow parenting encourages parents to plan and organize less for their children, instead allowing them to enjoy their childhood and explore the world at their own pace. Electronics are limited, simplistic toys are utilized, and the child is allowed to develop their own interests and to grow into their own person with much family time, allowing children to make their own decisions.

Idle parenting is a specific form of slow parenting according to which children can take care of themselves most of the time, and the parents would be happier if they spent more time taking care of themselves, too.

=== Toxic parenting ===
Toxic parenting is poor parenting, with a toxic relationship between the parent and child. It results in complete disruption of the child's ability to identify themselves and reduced self-esteem, neglecting the needs of the child. Abuse is sometimes seen in this parenting style. Adults who had toxic parents are mostly unable to recognize toxic parenting behavior in themselves. Children with toxic and/or abusive parents often grow up with psychological and behavioral damage. Some of the behaviors of toxic parenting include talking over their child, being in a cycle of negative thinking, being overly critical towards their children, and using guilt to control their child.

=== Pathogenic parenting ===
Pathogenic parenting refers to parenting style practices that are so aberrant and distorted that they produce significant psychopathology in the child. This may lead to child psychological abuse (DSM-5 V995.51). It is generally used in the context of distortions to the child's attachment system since the attachment system does not spontaneously or independently dysfunctional.

=== Dolphin parenting ===
Dolphin parenting is a term used by psychiatrist Shimi Kang and happiness researcher Shawn Achor to represent a parenting style seen as similar to the nature of dolphins, being "playful, social and intelligent". It has been contrasted to "tiger" parenting. According to Kang, dolphin parenting provides a balance between the strict approach of tiger parenting and the lack of rules and expectations that characterizes what she calls "jellyfish parents". Dolphin parents avoid overscheduling activities for their children, refrain from being overprotective, and take into account the desires and goals of their children when setting expectations for behavior and academic success.

=== Tiger parenting ===
Tiger parenting is a style of parenting that combines authoritarian parenting with being highly invested in the child's academic or other success. The term was coined by Amy Chua with her memoir Battle Hymn of the Tiger Mother.

=== 'Balloon' parenting ===
Balloon parenting is a form of uninvolved parenting in which the parents are often away from their children. When they leave their children, balloon parents may leave their child in daycare for long periods of time, or leave their children with a babysitter. They may also simply leave their children at home without a caretaker.

=== 'Ethnic minority' parenting style ===
'Ethnic minority' parenting style is an ethnocentric term coined in the USA out of authoritarian parenting, and it refers to a style characterized by exceptionally high academic achievements among children from Asian backgrounds. Ethnic minority style differs from strict authoritarian parenting by being highly responsive towards children's needs, while also differing from authoritative parenting by maintaining high demands, and not placing children's needs as a priority. This style promotes high demandingness and high responsiveness together to produce high academic performance in children.

=== Alloparenting parenting style ===
Alloparenting is the practice of co-parenting a child by biological parents and members of the extended family or community. This type of parenting is most prevalent in Central African countries, such as the Democratic Republic of Congo and the Central African Republic; especially in Akka foraging communities. Alloparenting is considered to help alleviate parental burdens by utilizing the community and allowing biological parents more time to work or participate in social events. Some historians, such as Stephanie Coontz, suggest that alloparenting as a parenting style helps children to understand love and trust through a widened perspective due to increased bonds formed between child and adult.

=== Unconditional parenting ===
The unconditional parenting style is one where parents provide their children with love and support no matter what the situation. This type of parenting does not involve rewards or punishments but instead focuses on building a strong relationship with one's child. It can be beneficial as it provides a sense of security for children.

Commando Parenting is another style where parents essentially do whatever it takes to raise children in their desired way.

=== Gentle parenting ===
In The Gentle Parenting Book, Sarah Ockwell-Smith describes the discipline of gentle parenting as "being responsive to children's needs" and "recogniz[ing] that all children are individuals.". With the help of sensitivity, respect, and understanding as well as the establishment of sound limits, gentle parenting aims to raise children who are self-assured, autonomous, and content. This method of parenting places a strong emphasis on age-appropriate growth. Traditional parenting methods emphasize rewards and discipline. One rewards their kid with enjoyable activities, treats, and encouraging words when they behave well or do something nice. Instead of concentrating on punishment and incentive, gentle parenting focuses on improving a child's self-awareness and understanding of their own conduct. Gentle parenting emphasizes how the parent's feelings are impacted by the child's behavior. This instills in them the same teachings about repercussions as conventional parenting methods, but with an emphasis on emotion. The child is observing the parent's reactions and learning how those actions make the parent feel. One of the greatest worries about gentle parenting is that the parent might come off as more of a companion than a parent, however, this is a misconception.

=== Parenting neurodivergent children ===
Baumrind recommends implementing an accountable parenting approach. Research findings indicate that ADHD children are more negative and are often outspoken and dictatorial and show fewer inclinations to fixing issues. Researchers' findings showed that ADHD parents are less lenient but more strict in their parenting styles. Parents of children with ADHD and other parents share a comparable authoritative parenting approach. Gender has no bearing on parenting style, but parents of ADHD kids with greater schooling tend to be more permissive and authoritarian. Additionally, parents of children with ADHD who had lesser levels of schooling were more lax than parents of kids without ADHD. These results suggest that families of children and teenagers with ADHD experience less family support and more behavioral and relational disturbances. When a parent adopts an autocratic parenting style, they are demanding but unresponsive. High standards and adherence to parental guidelines and directives define this parenting approach. Verbal conversation lacks emotional depth and is one-sided. When issuing orders, authoritarian parents frequently do not offer justification. These children are consequently lonely, depressed, susceptible, and wary. Additionally, in our research, parents of children with ADHD were less lax, which indicates that these parents have high expectations for their kids and exercise greater control over them. All of these things may be contributing factors to the signs of ADHD in kids and teenagers getting worse.

== Dysfunctional styles ==
Unhealthy parenting signs, which could lead to a family becoming dysfunctional include:

- Unrealistic expectations
- Ridicule
- Conditional love
- Disrespect; especially contempt
- Emotional intolerance (family members not allowed to express the "wrong" emotions)
- Emotional abuse
- Emotional Neglect (Child's emotional needs are not met or dismissed in some way.)
- Social dysfunction or isolation (for example, parents unwilling to reach out to other families—especially those with children of the same gender and approximate age, or do nothing to help their "friendless" child)
- Stifled speech (children not allowed to dissent or question authority)
- Denial of an "inner life" (children are not allowed to develop their own value systems)
- Being under- or over-protective
- Apathy ("I don't care!")
- Belittling ("You can't do anything right!")
- Shame ("Shame on you!")
- Bitterness (regardless of what is said, using a bitter tone of voice)
- Hypocrisy ("Do as I say, not as I do")
- Lack of forgiveness for minor misdeeds or accidents
- Judgmental statements or demonization ("You are a liar!")
- Being overly critical and withholding proper praise (experts say 80–90% praise, and 10–20% constructive criticism is the most healthy)
- Double standards or giving "mixed messages" by having a dual system of values (i.e. one set for the outside world, another when in private, or teaching divergent values to each child)
- The absentee parent (seldom available for their child due to work overload, alcohol/drug abuse, gambling, or other addictions)
- Unfulfilled projects, activities, and promises affecting children ("We'll do it later")
- Giving to one child what rightly belongs to another
- Gender prejudice (treats one gender of children fairly; the other unfairly)
- Discussion and exposure to sexuality: either too much, too soon or too little, too late
- Faulty discipline based more on emotions or family politics than on established rules (e.g., punishment by "surprise")
- Having an unpredictable emotional state due to substance abuse, personality disorder(s), or stress
- Parents always (or never) take their children's side when others report acts of misbehavior, or teachers report problems at school
- Scapegoating (knowingly or recklessly blaming one child for the misdeeds of another)
- "Tunnel vision" diagnosis of children's problems (for example, a parent may think their child is either lazy or has learning disabilities after he falls behind in school despite recent absence due to illness)
- Older siblings given either no or excessive authority over younger siblings with respect to their age difference and level of maturity
- Frequent withholding of consent ("blessing") for culturally common, lawful, and age-appropriate activities a child wants to take part in
- The "know-it-all" (has no need to obtain child's side of the story when accusing, or listen to child's opinions on matters which greatly impact them)
- Regularly forcing children to attend activities for which they are extremely over- or under-qualified (e.g. using a preschool to babysit a typical nine-year-old boy, taking a young child to poker games, etc.)
- Either being a miser ("scrooge") in totality or selectively allowing children's needs to go unmet (e.g. a father will not buy a bicycle for his son because he wants to save money for retirement or "something important")
- Disagreements about nature and nurture (parents, often non-biological, blame common problems on child's heredity, when faulty parenting may be the actual cause)

=== "Children as pawns" ===
One common dysfunctional parental behavior is a parent's manipulation of a child in order to achieve some outcome adverse to the other parent's rights or interests. Examples include verbal manipulation such as spreading gossip about the other parent, communicating with the parent through the child (and in the process exposing the child to the risks of the other parent's displeasure with that communication) rather than doing so directly, trying to obtain information through the child (spying), or causing the child to dislike the other parent, with insufficient or no concern for the damaging effects of the parent's behavior on the child. While many instances of such manipulation occur in shared custody situations that have resulted from separation or divorce, it can also take place in intact families, where it is known as triangulation.

=== List of other dysfunctional styles ===
- "Using" (destructively narcissistic parents who rule by fear and conditional love)
- Abusing (parents who use physical violence, or emotionally, or sexually abuse their children)
- Dogmatic or cult-like (harsh and inflexible discipline, with children not allowed, within reason, to dissent, question authority, or develop their own value system)
- Inequitable parenting (going to extremes for one child while continually ignoring the needs of another)
- Deprivation (control or neglect by withholding love, support, necessities, sympathy, praise, attention, encouragement, supervision, or otherwise putting their children's well-being at risk)
- Abuse among siblings (parents fail to intervene when a sibling physically or sexually abuses another sibling)
- Abandonment (a parent who willfully separates from their children, not wishing any further contact, and in some cases without locating alternative, long-term parenting arrangements, leaving them as orphans)
- Appeasement (parents who reward bad behavior—even by their own standards—and inevitably punish another child's good behavior in order to maintain the peace and avoid temper tantrums. "Peace at any price")
- Loyalty manipulation (giving unearned rewards and lavish attention trying to ensure a favored yet rebellious child will be the one most loyal and well-behaved, while subtly ignoring the wants and needs of their most loyal child currently)
- "The deceivers" (well-regarded parents in the community, likely to be involved in some charitable/non-profit works, who abuse or mistreat one or more of their children)
- "Public image manager" (sometimes related to above, children warned to not disclose what fights, abuse, or damage happens at home, or face severe punishment. "Don't tell anyone what goes on in this family")
- "The paranoid parent" (a parent having persistent and irrational fear accompanied by anger and false accusations that their child is up to no good or others are plotting harm)
- "No friends allowed" (parents discourage, prohibit, or interfere with their child from making friends of the same age and gender)
- Role reversal (parents who expect their minor children to take care of them instead)
- "Not your business" (children continuously told that a particular brother or sister who is often causing problems is none of their concern)
- Ultra-egalitarianism (either a much younger child is permitted to do whatever an older child may, or an older child must wait years until a younger child is mature enough)
- "The guard dog" (a parent who blindly attacks family members perceived as causing the slightest upset to their esteemed spouse, partner, or child)
- "My baby forever" (a parent who will not allow one or more of their young children to grow up and begin taking care of themselves)
- "The cheerleader" (one parent "cheers on" the other parent who is simultaneously abusing their child)
- "Along for the ride" (a reluctant de facto, step, foster, or adoptive parent who does not truly care about their non-biological child, but must co-exist in the same home for the sake of their spouse or partner) (See also: Cinderella effect)
- "The politician" (a parent who repeatedly makes or agrees to children's promises while having little to no intention of keeping them)
- "It's taboo" (parents rebuff any questions children may have about sexuality, pregnancy, romance, puberty, certain areas of human anatomy, nudity, etc.)
- Identified patient (one child, usually selected by the mother, who is forced into going to therapy while the family's overall dysfunction is kept hidden)
- Münchausen syndrome by proxy (a much more extreme situation than above, where the child is intentionally made ill by a parent seeking attention from physicians and other professionals)

== Cross-cultural variation ==
Many of these theories of parenting styles are almost entirely based on evidence from high-income countries, especially the USA. However, there are many fundamental differences in child development between high and low-income countries, due to differences in parenting styles and practices. For instance, in sub-Saharan Africa children are likely to have more than one main caregiver, to acquire language in a bilingual environment, and to play in mixed aged peer groups. However, when comparing African American caregiving among lower, middle, and upper socioeconomic families, the number of non-parental caregivers decreases as economic resources increase. In addition, international studies have found Chinese parents to be more concerned with impulse control, which may explain the greater use of authoritarian style as compared to U.S. parents. Thus, social values and norms within a culture influence the choice of parenting style that will help the child conform to cultural expectations.

There is evidence to suggest cultural differences in the way children respond to parenting practices. In particular, there is ongoing debate surrounding physical discipline and corporal punishment of children. with some authors suggesting it is less harmful in ethnic groups or countries where it is culturally normative, such as several low income countries, where the prevalence rate remains high. Lansford et al (2004) reported harsh parenting was associated with more externalising behaviours in European American compared with African American adolescents. Resolving these issues is important in assessing the transferability of parenting interventions across cultures and from high to low income countries in order to improve child development and health outcomes.

Some parenting styles correlate with positive outcomes across cultures, while other parenting styles correlate with outcomes that are specific to one culture. For example, authoritative parenting is related to positive self-esteem and academic outcomes for both Chinese and European American adolescents, but the positive effects of the "ethnic minority" parenting style are specific to Chinese adolescents. There is also evidence to suggest that there is not only cultural variation but variations across settings within a culture. For example, Mexican American and African American parental expectations of obedience and autonomy differ in school and other social settings vs. home. A study comparing Indian parents who stayed in India and Indian parents who immigrated to a different country shows that the influence cultural traditions have on parenting changes according to social/geographical context, concluding that immigrant parents place greater emphasis on traditional Indian culture in order to preserve traditional practices in their new country. Thus, in immigrant families, parenting styles according to culture may be the result of conscious reinforcement as opposed to unconscious tradition.

== Differences for male and female children ==
Parents tend to adopt different parenting behaviors based on the sex of their child, fathers more so than mothers. Studies have shown that fathers are more emotionally and mentally reactive with their daughters. This may cause fathers to have a different parental style between their daughters and sons. For example, fathers tend to focus on their sons' masculinity, teaching them about independence. Fathers treat their daughters with more gentleness, focusing on her ability to care for others.

Mothers tend to engage with their children differently based on the child's sex, being less restrictive when engaging in physical play with their sons and encouraging children to behave in different manners based on the child's sex. Conversations and the vocabulary mothers use with their children may also differ based on their gender, with mothers having more social conversation with their daughters. Mothers tend to have the same parenting style regardless of the gender of their child.

Children who are transgender are more likely to have some sort of conflict with their parents because they are transgender. Transgender youth are more likely to have worse parental relationships compared to their peers and feel unsupported by their familial unit. Trans women often experience rejection from their family or others in their youth because they participated in activities that did not align with traditional gender roles or because they were seen as too feminine.

== Differential parenting ==
Differential parenting is when siblings individually receive different parenting styles or behavior from their parents. This most often occurs in families where the children are adolescents, and is highly related as to how each child interprets their parent's behavior. Research shows that children who view their parents as authoritative generally tend to be happier and functioning at a higher level in a variety of areas. When analyzing the level of differentiation within a family, it is important to look at the difference in the level of responsiveness (including specific characteristics of warmth, sensitivity, and positivity), control, leniency, and negativity that are directed at each individual child. Differential parenting often leads to a non-shared environment, which is when siblings have different experiences growing up in the same household, and different personal outcomes based on their environment.

In most families with more than one child, parents will adjust their parenting styles according to what their child best responds to, however, a high level of differential parenting can have negative effects on children. The effects that differential parenting has on families differs, but in general there are usually negative effects on both children. The severity of effects is more extreme for the child who is viewed as disfavored. The "disfavored" child generally has a variety of personal development issues such as low self-esteem and depression. The favored child tends to have higher self-esteem and more friends in school. However, studies show that both favored and disfavored children tend to have problems with interpersonal relationships, as well as problems with managing their emotions. A high level of differential parenting also influences how siblings treat one another, and the level of conflict in the sibling relationship. Research shows that this is due in part to children imitating their parents' behaviors.

One theory being discussed in relation to differential parenting is social comparison. Social comparison is the outcome of adolescents comparing the treatment they receive from their guardians versus the treatment their siblings receive. While these comparisons on treatment may be subconscious, it is vital to a child's formation of self-worth and their perceived role within the family dynamic. As the years go on and adolescents grow and mature, their perception of differential parenting within their household becomes prominent and plays a role in forming one's own identity. If the adolescent views inequitable treatment intentional or not on behalf of the guardian's report have shown internalized symptoms of depression, anxiety, etc., and external outburst such as risk-taking, and delinquency to non-verbally communicate to a guardian unfair treatment. Parental differential treatment is seen by researchers as "arguably a subjective phenomenon" because it is based on perception. Much research has still yet to be completed on this subject but based on what is known can be attributed to the social comparison arising from differential parenting.

Contemporary research also recognizes that parenting practices may be different depending on a child's individuals characteristics like developmental stage, temperament and emotional needs. This multi perspective suggest that children influence parenting behaviors as parents respond to their children unique personalities and behaviors across time.

== See also ==
- Child abuse
- Chastisement
- Dysfunctional family
- Neglect
- Resources for Infant Education (RIE)
- Hong Kong children
- Honor killing
- Battle Hymn of the Tiger Mother
- Reflective Parenting
- Tough love § Parenting and cultures
