= Monster parents =

Term characterizing irrational parenting

Monster parents (Japanese: モンスターペアレント, Chinese: 怪獸家長) is a term characterizing irrational parenting. Monster parents are known to raise their children with a "bizarre blend of authoritarianism and overprotectiveness." They are overprotective by virtue of making numerous requests and complaints to their children's teachers, which themselves are often viewed as "unreasonable". The phrase originated in Japan and gained widespread usage in Hong Kong.

== Origins ==
The phrase "monster parent" was originally a Wasei-eigo term coined by Japanese educator Yōichi Mukōyama (ja:向山洋一) in 2007. It was subsequently made known in Asia by a Japanese TV drama also called Monster Parents. The show depicted a series of observations from real life situations in schools where parents of students often interfered in school affairs and teachers' teaching. The show was broadcast from July 1, 2008, to September 9, 2008. By 2011, the phrase had also seen widespread usage in Hong Kong as well.

== Hong Kong ==
=== Education system ===
Under the Hong Kong education system, most students are required to attend interviews that assess their academic and extracurricular achievements in order for them to attend academically prestigious schools. Most schools will select a group of academically gifted interviewees to attend. Because of this, parents have been observed to pressure their children to excel in school and extracurricular activities in order to get into their selected school. Once their children get into these schools, the parents may continue to voice complaints in order to make their concerns heard.

=== Development ===
Monster parents exhibit an authoritarian parenting style, forcing children to follow tight schedules with little time to manage their daily lives and routines. They are highly-protective in taking care of their children and are seen as restrictive and controlling. They often spoil their children in order to get them to do tasks that the parents wish them to do. According to Global Voices, Hong Kong has been a knowledge-based economic system since the early 2000s. This puts pressure on parents to ensure that their children excel in early childhood and gain acceptance into prestigious schools. The rise of monster parents has been thought to be caused by a decline in birth rate in recent years. Children are also coming from other parts of China, often called "cross-border students", and attending schools that only Hong Kong children were originally allowed to attend.

=== Traits ===
Monster parents are often identified as meeting four criteria, according to many that come in contact with them. They are first identified as having an intense need to control their children. This causes the children to develop an inability to think for themselves. Next, they often force their children to take part in activities that they do not necessarily like. This includes taking extra classes on top of their normal ones, and participating in extracurricular activities that they are not interested in. Third, monster parents look at academics before anything else regarding their children. If their children do poorly in school, monster parents blame it on everything but the children. Lastly, monster parents think that their children are right in everything they do. According to them, they can do no wrong.

== Japan ==
Naoki Oji, an education critic and former professor at Hosei University, mentions this "monster parents' phenomena" in a report based on a survey about monster parents in Japan (2007). Since a lack of communication between teachers and parents is responsible for the "monster parents' phenomena", he suggests that constructing closer relationships between schools and community can be a solution to this problem by creating better mutual understanding.

The survey was conducted in 2007 and 1247 people responded. 31% of responders were men while 68.6% were women. 12.3% of them are parents, and the majority of the rest are people who work in education or education-related occupations. He then later categorizes the monster parents in several types and analyses their psychological elements.

1) Overparenting/Over interference type
The parents in this category who believe in children-centered policy demand excessive requests to teachers. For instance, "report me how many times my child raised his/her hand in the class." The centralization of parents' attention on single child will explains this as a result of lower number of children.

== Effects on children ==
=== Social effects ===
Monster parents often interfere in their children's personal life and tend to coddle them. As a result, these children often end up developing anti-social personality traits and attitudes and tend to be overly-reliant on their parents. A commonly used term in Asia to describe this phenomenon is "prince/princess sickness". These children have also been seen to exhibit tendencies towards aggression and violence to get their way, according to some researchers.

=== Psychological effects ===
Monster parents tend to be very overprotective of their children and often coddle them for most of their childhood. Because of this, children of monster parents often grow up to exhibit bad behavior and narcissistic personality traits. Monster parents also place a great deal of pressure on their children to excel in school in order to be admitted into more prestigious schools. This places an enormous amount of pressure and stress on the children. Children have to handle a significant workload at school, which may be too intense for them to deal with. They are constantly expected to expand their knowledge and skills. Children of monster parents often feel depressed and disappointed in themselves if they fail to meet the expectations of their parents. This anxiety can build up in the children and cause severe mental illness. It may even lead to suicide.

=== Consequences ===
There are foreseeable influences caused by monster parenting style. It may affect children's academic developments and their future careers as well. With the monster parenting style, it is believed that the parents may have extremely high expectations about their children's academic achievements. Indeed, children may appear to start feeling the pressure when they start failing to reach the high hopes and expectations of their parents while academic stress arises. Generally, the lack of independence may influence the children's future career as there are no opportunities for them to practice and learn before entering the workplace. A good deal of how one parents is shaped by how they were parented. It is reasonable to assume that monster parenting style is a vicious cycle and becomes a long-term social issue. Parents wield enormous clout in the development of their children, as they are who the children look up to and learn from. Parenting patterns are passed down from generation to generation. Thus, excessively protective parenting style may influence more and more generation until there is an alternative parenting style to replace it.

== See also ==
- Helicopter parent, a similar parenting style in the United States
- Kyoiku mama, a similar parenting style in Japan
- Tiger parent, a similar parenting style in Mainland China and other parts of East Asia, South Asia and Southeast Asia
- Concerted cultivation
- Overqualification
- Credentialism
- Population decline
- Free-range parenting
- Evolutionary psychology of parenting
