= Helicoptering =

Helicoptering can refer to the actions of a helicopter, or by analogy to:

- the anemochoric (wind-based) dispersal of autorotating samara
- the hovering behavior of a helicopter parent
