= Little emperor syndrome =

Children's psychology term in China

The little emperors (or little emperor effect) is an aspect or view of the People's Republic of China's one-child policy. It occurs where children of the modern upper class and wealthier Chinese families gain seemingly excessive amounts of attention from their parents and grandparents. Combined with increased spending power within the family unit due to China's growing economic strength, and parents' general desire for their child to experience the benefits they themselves were denied, the phenomenon is generally considered to be controversial. The British journalist Andrew Marshall even argues that it is shaping modern Chinese society in unexpected ways that may culminate into a future "behavioral time-bomb".

Little emperors were primarily an urban phenomenon. The one-child policy generally only applied to urban communities and, given the value of labor, one-child families are not prevalent within rural communities. Economic development has not had as large of an impact outside of urban locations.

== Dynamics ==
=== Son preference in China ===
There is a cultural preference for having sons over daughters in China. It is argued that this is due to agrarian traditions. A preference for sons has also been linked to Confucianism.

=== Socio-economic implications ===
Modern China's economic growth has tremendously elevated the annual per capita income of urban areas as women have become increasingly represented in the workforce, frequently resulting in families with two sources of income. This greatly improved purchasing power coupled with excessive pampering of an only children is the cause of increased spending on children. From toys to clothes, parents shower their child in material goods and give in to every demand; it is common for children to be the "best-dressed members of their families".

Recently, it has become common for most of a family's income to be spent on the child. This effect has become considerable enough to be noticed on a global scale: marketing groups attribute a near doubling of platinum jewelry sales in China to "Chinese's 'spoiled brat' generation".

=== Parental expectations ===
Little emperors also bear the burden of heavy expectations. Parents who feel they lost their chance in the Cultural Revolution ("compensation syndrome") put immense pressure on these children to succeed and compete academically. From an early age parents push their only child to educational extremes as they cater to their whims; "though many of these precocious kids can recite the English alphabet or read newspapers in traditional Chinese characters by the time they're 10, their parents often still perform basic tasks for them: fixing their hair, tying their shoes, wiping their bottoms." Boarding school, private English lessons, music lessons and an additional range of extracurricular activities are the normal fare.

Child's slave (Chinese: 孩奴; pinyin: háinú) is a term used in China to describe parents, especially those born in the 1980s, who are under financial, physical, or mental pressure when raising their children. Parents who are "child's slaves" may lose their sense of purpose because they live and work solely for their children, while children themselves are usually spoiled by their parents' indulgence.

=== Household structure ===
One factor frequently associated with the little emperor effect is the "four-two-one" family structure, which refers to the collapse of the traditionally large Chinese family into four grandparents and two parents doting on one child. Beyond the obvious further funneling of resources towards the whims and potential of the only child, this four-two-one reconfiguration of the familial structure has distinct ramifications for Chinese society. The little emperors of the one-child policy have warped the traditional family beyond recognition; "in the past, the power in a household devolved from the father", who ruled over a multitude of offspring. Now the household structures itself entirely around the one child.

This shift from earlier structures that supported the culture of filial piety has caused much concern; "traditionally, a great number of children, particularly sons, was seen as proof of the family's standing and it guaranteed the continuity of ancestor-worshipping customs." The most salient issue stems from the worry about who will look after the elderly. Aside from a potentially radical shift in cultural norms concerning the treatment of the elderly, this new family structure poses a purely demographic problem: "the composition of the dependent population is shifting away from children toward elderly population."

=== Religion and psychology ===
Many Chinese families use traditional Confucian values to teach their only child. Confucianism considers Ren (love and social responsibility) the core emotion that inspires other moral concepts in personal motivation. The child often receives too much love and has been highly mentally and physically restricted to devote themselves to a heavy load of schoolwork, considering that the economic future of the family depends on their success. Such a situation can directly lead to the overindulgence of the child thus reversing traditional Confucian values of Ren (仁) and filial piety (xiao 孝). There is also evidence that many young Chinese feel heavily burdened and a huge sense of responsibility toward their parents, understanding that their success can have crucial consequences for their family.

Depending on specific family conditions and a child's outlook, this burden can lead to a diligent lifestyle, a more rebellious attitude to traditional codes, an inability to cope with such pressure, or a lack of self-discipline.

The combination of immense pressure to excel and extreme pampering is reported to have resulted in a stunting of social and emotional growth. The perceived maladjustment of the little emperors is an exaggerated subject within the media; "the government has [tried] to cope with the little emperor problem through frequent cautionary stories in the press." These stories depict children hanging themselves after being denied sweets and cases of matricide in retribution for a scolding or late dinner. The discussion of little emperors has saturated public discussion concerning the one-child policy in Chinese and international media.

Psychological studies do not support this view or, at best, offered mixed results. Results from earlier studies are inconsistent with some more recent studies that suggest there are no reliable differences between only children and those with siblings. However, a survey published in 2013 on 431 Beijing adults finds that those who had grown up after the introduction of the one-child policy were lacking "entrepreneurial drive and the willingness to take risks". This even had a significant impact on career choices.

== Prevalence ==
Peter Hessler, who worked as an English teacher in China in periods from the 1990s until 2020, argued that "I saw few signs of Little Emperor syndrome, which seems to be based primarily on a Western imagining of what an only-child society might be like."

== See also ==
- Hong Kong Kids phenomenon
- Helicopter parent
- Chinese kinship
- Princess sickness
