= Harvard Girl =

Book by Liu Weihua

哈佛女孩刘亦婷 Harvard Girl Liu Yiting
- The cover of Harvard Girl, showing Liu with her Harvard acceptance letter.
- Author: Liu Weihua, Zhang Xinwu
- Language: Chinese
- Genre: Parenting
- Publisher: Writers Publishing House
- Publication date: 2000
- Publication place: People's Republic of China
- Pages: 384
- ISBN: 7-5063-1942-X

Harvard Girl (full title Harvard Girl Liu Yiting: A Character Training Record; Chinese: 哈佛女孩刘亦婷：素质培养纪实; pinyin: Hāfó Nǚhái Liú Yìtíng: sùzhì péiyǎng jìshí) is a book written by Liu Weihua (刘卫华) and Zhang Xinwu (张欣武), which describes how they raised their daughter, Liu Yiting (刘亦婷), to be accepted to Harvard University.

Published in 2000 in Chinese by the Writers Publishing House, the book details the rigorous lifestyle that Liu led and includes advice from Liu's parents on how to raise children to gain acceptance to top-tier universities; it has been described as a "manual" for child-rearing and early education.

The book was a bestseller in mainland China and made both Harvard and Liu Yiting household names among Chinese parents and students. It has since had numerous imitators, spawning an entire genre of how-to books on child-rearing for Chinese parents.

== Biography of Liu Yiting ==
Liu was raised in Chengdu, the capital of Sichuan province. Liu's parents, believers in the value of early childhood education, subjected her to a rigorous education since she was just 15 days old. For example, to ensure that someone was always talking to Liu, they invited relatives over to the house. They also had her participate in "character-building" physical exercises such as swimming, jumping rope, and holding ice in her hands for extended periods of time. Liu also acted in a soap opera when she was five years old.

While in high school, Liu met then Gibson, Dunn & Crutcher partner Larry L. Simms, a Dartmouth ('66) and Boston University Law (’73) alumnus and former Navy communications officer who, having served as editor-in-chief of the BU Law Review, clerked for Supreme Court Justice Byron White for October Term 1974, coming from the chambers of Judge James L. Oakes of U.S. Court of Appeals for the Second Circuit. He then worked at Reporters Committee for Freedom of the Press for one year and joined DOJ's Office of Legal Counsel in 1976, rising to the rank of Deputy Assistant Attorney General (DAAG) with a breif period during 1981 presidential transition serving as Acting Assistant Attorney General (AAG), and left in 1985 for parntership at Gibson Dunn until retiring in 2005. With Simms' assistance, Liu participated in a student exchange program sponsored by Washington-Beijing Scholastic Exchange, Inc., of which Simms was the founder and President, and visited America in 1998. This experience changed her views about life in America, because like many Chinese citizens, most of her impressions about America came from Hollywood, and when she came to the country she was "surprised that [she] didn't see any street fights or police-car chases". The program also piqued her interest in American universities, where she realized she would be able to study a variety of subjects.

Although they had been training her to attend a preeminent university, Liu's parents had not expected that she would attend an American one; her mother has said that until Liu came back from America, she had not been aware that Chinese students could apply to American universities. At the time, it was unusual for Chinese students to attend American schools as undergraduates, as most only applied to schools abroad for postgraduate education. However, rather than taking the gaokao, China's national college entrance examination, and attending one of the National Key Universities, Liu applied to American colleges with recommendation from Simms. She was accepted to several schools, including Harvard, Columbia, Wellesley, and Mount Holyoke, from which she ultimately chose to attend Harvard. Not long afterwards, a local newspaper announced her acceptance and the family was "besieged with thousands of phone calls".

At Harvard, Liu majored in applied mathematics and economics and earned high grades; she also chaired the Harvard Project for Asian and International Relations, a student organization. She was described as "unassuming" and a "typical student", to the point that it took her roommate four years to realize Liu was a celebrity in China. In 2003, Liu graduated and took a job at the Boston Consulting Group in New York City.

== Synopsis ==
Liu Weihua (Liu's mother) and Zhang Xinwu (Liu's stepfather) published Harvard Girl in 2000, after Liu had matriculated at Harvard. According to Liu, her parents had plans early on to write about their parenting methods, but they waited until 2000 to publish the book, relying on Liu's perceived success to establish themselves as "experts". The book primarily consists of research-like notes and diary entries, which Liu and her parents began recording and saving before Liu was in first grade. Liu herself helped edit the book, and wrote several of the later chapters.

One major element of the child-rearing strategy described in the book was treating Liu as an adult and "encourag[ing] her to develop a mature style of thinking". Liu's parents never used baby talk when Liu was a child, and they allowed her to argue with them but required her to present reasoned arguments like an adult. According to education scholar Ben Mardell, the book's focus on independent thinking and intellectual development was a "break with the past" in China, where both early and higher education often emphasize rote learning.

In addition, the book details the rigorous "character-building exercises" Liu's parents had her perform. In addition to having her do physical exercises, Liu's parents controlled her diet. They also frequently took her traveling, both on short trips to nearby rural areas and on longer trips to historical sites such as Xi'an. Throughout the book, high value is placed on "full development", and the writers encourage parents to cultivate more than just academic ability in their children.

The book also includes supplementary chapters on topics such as how to select which schools to apply to, and advice for students on filling out applications and taking TOEFL and SAT exams.

== Impact ==
The book was at the top of China's bestseller list for 16 months, during which time it sold at least 1.5 million copies (Note: The exact number of sales is unclear; while it had sold about 1.5 million copies through the publisher by early 2003, it was estimated that 2 million more infringing copies were sold in the same time period (Lin-Liu 2003).) and the writers were estimated to have earned at least the equivalent of $100,000 in royalties. It became a must-have book for middle-class parents in China. The popularity of Harvard Girl made Liu a "national superstar" and she frequently received fan mail and drew large crowds at book signings in mainland China. The success of this and similar books (another bestseller in 2001 and 2002 was Robert Kiyosaki's Rich Dad Poor Dad) in mainland China has been said to reflect a "national obsession" among Chinese parents to get their children into top-ranking American schools.

Harvard Girl was followed by numerous imitations by parents of other successful students, and is said to have spawned an entire genre of education "manuals" for Chinese parents, including similar books on how to get one's children into schools such as Oxford University, Cambridge University, or Cornell University. This genre includes titles such as Ivy League is Not a Dream, From Andover to Harvard, How We Got Our Child Into Yale, Harvard Family Instruction, The Door of the Elite, Harvard Boy Zhang Zhaomu, Harvard Talents: Children Cultivated by the Karl Weter Educational Law, Tokyo University Boy, Cornell Girl, and Our Dumb Little Boy Goes to Cambridge.

Comparable books have also been published in South Korea, although American undergraduate universities are not "revered" in the same way there as they are in mainland China. In addition to imitators, Liu's parents have written their own follow-up: Harvard Girl 2: Liu Yiting's Studying Methods and Upbringing Details (＜哈佛女孩刘亦婷＞之二： 刘亦婷的学习方法和培养细节), which describes Liu's four years in college, was published in 2004 by Writers Publishing House.

The book also affected applications to Harvard. It made Harvard a household name in China, and books of this genre caused a significant increase in the number of Chinese applicants to top-tier American universities. In 1999, Liu and 43 other Chinese students applied to Harvard, and by 2008, 484 Chinese students had.

=== Criticism ===
The book has been criticized for increasing the pressure many Chinese students already had to succeed in school, and for taking advantage of the widespread belief that admission into leading universities is necessary for success in life. Some critics have called the book "boastful."

A 2004 book by Xiao Hui (萧愚), entitled Raising Children Requires Great Wisdom: The Truth About "Harvard Girl Liu Yiting" (教育孩子需要大智慧：“哈佛女孩刘亦婷”真相), harshly criticizes Harvard Girl, calling the methods described in the book "false character building" ("伪素质教育") and claiming that Liu gained entrance into Harvard not because of her comprehensive or well-rounded education, but by exploiting loopholes and defects in Harvard's admissions policy for Chinese students or by taking advantage of guanxi, personal relationships and networks.

Many successful Chinese students after Liu have tried to distance themselves from the so-called "Harvard Girl Phenomenon;" Harvard students Yin Zhongrui and Tang Meijie have both stated they do not want to be compared to "Harvard Girl." Yin's mother published a book, From Andover to Harvard, about how her son was accepted by Harvard, but Yin only allowed his full name to appear in the book's preface. Tang received at least six offers from publishers to have a book written about her, but declined them all. Nevertheless, many of China's top students are still compared to "Harvard Girl," and admissions to top overseas universities often make big news in mainland China; for example, Cheng Wanxin (程琬芯) attracted media attention in Sichuan province when she was accepted to Harvard in April 2009.

== See also ==
- Hothousing
- Battle Hymn of the Tiger Mother
