= Gong nui =

Pejorative stereotype of Hong Kong women

Gong nui, also spelt gong neoi or kong nui (Chinese: 港女; lit. 'Kong girl') is a Cantonese pejorative term describing a negative stereotype of Hong Kong women as materialistic, narcissistic and being obsessed with non-Chinese culture, generally suffering from "princess syndrome".

== Origin ==
The use of gong nui as a pejorative term originated on internet forums. In February 2005, a Hong Kong woman identified as "Jenny" complained on an online forum about her boyfriend not paying for snacks worth 63.8 Hong Kong dollars, later known as the "63.8 Incident". After the posts, a lot of internet users negatively commented on Jenny's behaviour, which led to a conflict between Jenny, her few supporters, and her attackers. "Gong nui" was then used to describe Jenny. This word does not represent all women in Hong Kong but being used to describe all the women who are arrogant, proud, and shallow.

The word "Hong Kong Girls" was coined online and there are several main forums either defending or attacking this phenomenon.

== Situation ==
"Gong Nui" comes from the phrase "Hong Kong's girl". Originally, it was a neutral phrase. But after many Hong Kong internet forum users used this word to describe the women they met in Hong Kong who were materialistic, snobbish, superficial, self-centered and selfish, this word became a negative phrase. There are no formal characteristics to describe "Gong Nui". According to "Kong Girls and Lang Mo: teen perceptions of emergent gender stereotypes in Hong Kong", respondents suggest that "Gong Nui" always expect others to comply, full of vanity, bad-tempered and materialistic. Although this phrase normally addresses specific individuals, it is also used to compare women from Hong Kong to other women. According to research, 50% of the respondents say that all women in Hong Kong have Gong Nui characteristics.

Sometimes, "Gong Nui" is used to mention a woman who is considered to be a "gold worshipper" with "Princess Sickness". "Princess Sickness" is a popular slang expression closely related to the "by imperial decree" attitude.

Over time, Gong Nui has become synonymous with women with "princess sickness", those who act as if they were princesses waiting for others to serve them.

While most often the term is used by men, some women use it to belittle or criticize those who display these traits. They make efforts to avoid being considered Gong Nui. This may owe to the reason for the increase of Hong Kong men marrying Mainland Chinese women. The number of cross-border marriages between Hong Kong residents and Mainland Chinese has risen tenfold from 1995 to 2005, accounting for more than one-third of registered marriages involving Hong Kong residents in 2005.

"Kong Girl" is not only stereotypical term applied to women in Hong Kong. "Lang Mo" is another example.. Although half of respondents think that "Lang Mo" is positive in research, "Lang Mo" are criticized for using their bodies as a form of currency. Both terms are derogatory when used by those who hold old-fashioned beliefs of what a woman should be.

"Gender stereotypes are not created in a vacuum, but rather emerge from within a particular sociohistorical context in which social participants position themselves and others in salient ways." Hong Kong is an international city, but the main gender stereotypes still come from China.

== Viewpoints on Gong Nui ==
Generally, men have negative feelings on 'Gong Nui'. They refuse to get married with Gong Nui as they think those girls are materialistic and above all, the girls are not looking for true love but someone who is wealthy. Besides, it is difficult to get along with Gong Nui while they are "narcissistic" according to the definition of Gong Nui. Gong Nui being self-confident, men would gradually lose their self-esteem in front of these girls and they would be afraid of having low status at home after marriage. They, therefore, do not even want to have a relationship with Gong Nui. However, the truth is that there is also existence of "Gong nui", narcissistic women in many countries. They are merely not publicised and talked widespread by people.

In most cases, women in Hong Kong regard the "Gong nui" label as offensive. Some of them nowadays have high education level and income, as a result, they would simply want their partner to have as same social status as they have. From their point of view, all they want is a stable future and the sense of security instead of money or material stuff.

== Reason ==
Consumerism is a serious phenomenon in Hong Kong, due to the fact that Hong Kong is an international city. No one cares how people work hard at the back of success, but only how you superficially behave gloriously. According to "After the Binge, the Hangover" Research, there are more than 50% Hong Kong respondents have brand new clothes with hangtags in their closets that have never been worn, because they have to continuously buy clothes in order to show that he or she lives well under this international city. Gong nui is definitely one of the respondents and consumers. Consumerism surely relates to materialism. In Hong Kong, many loan advertisements are existed on the TV show and they promote that Loan can help people pay off the credit card. Some even say loan can help people travelling and shopping freely. Normally, they hide the consequence and set the step of loan more earlier. The media of Hong Kong encourages people to consume, which actually encourage materialism too.

The education level of Hong Kong women has been increasing, that more and more women in Hong Kong are getting equal opportunities of higher education as men. Women can be more independent nowadays, but the old Chinese gender stereotype is still staying in Hong Kong. Although equality of male and female is encouraged in Hong Kong, the old thinking "husband should be richer than wife" is still not eliminated. An asymmetric gender stereotype change is happening. The right of the females is increasing without the responsibility. Nowadays, females can be financially independent from males, it means that they don't need males to afford their consumption. They can choose a male not only because he is rich but more about love, personality... But the old thinking "husband should richer than wife" encourage females to choose a male with more property. According to the research of the Women's Commission, more women considered objective factors such as education level and social status to be among the major considerations for choosing a spouse.

Additionally, the population proportion in Hong Kong also accounts for the reason why there is an existence of the term of gong nui. According to the Census and Statistics Department of Hong Kong government, the female population in Hong Kong in 2017 is 4.012 million, while male population is merely 3.397 million. The gender population in Hong Kong is rather imbalanced. Moreover, Hong Kong men start to search for women in other countries instead of in Hong Kong, leading to more and more Hong Kong unmarried women in excess. That is why Hong Kong women become more materialistic and arrogant, because they also do not aim for Hong Kong men within Hong Kong society.

== Gong nui VS Gong nam ==
In addition to Gong nui, there is also an existence of the term "Gong nam", referring to a typical type of Hong Kong boys. While the online platform criticises gong nui as unruly, obstinate, materialistic, picky and have princess sickness, gong nui also criticises gong nam for an equal number of shortcomings. There is an article listing 81 faults of Hong Kong boys, including stingy, horny, immature and appear to be very weak in a relationship . In 2013 October, one Hong Kong girl slapped her boyfriend publicly in the street. The man kneeled on the ground, apologised and hoped for a forgiveness from his girlfriend. The video later was uploaded online to many of the online platforms and become widespread. On one hand, people criticise the girl acting exactly like a Gong nui, however, on the other hand, people also blame the man for being coward and losing male's faces, which refers to the characteristics of a Gong nam.

The conflicts usually start with a contradiction of generosity and narrow-mind, material and body. Gong nui believe men should appropriately do a better work and be generous on the aspect of money, while gong nam criticise women in Hong Kong over-rank themselves.

== See also ==
- Kong Boys and Kong Girls
- Culture of Hong Kong
- Internet culture
- Women in Hong Kong
