= Writers Publishing House =

Chinese publishing house

The Writers Publishing House (Chinese: 作家出版社; pinyin: Zuòjiā Chūbǎnshè) is a large-scale publishing house in mainland China. It was established in 1953, and was attached to the Chinese Publishing Association (作家出版协会). It publishes mostly contemporary literature, and has published several bestselling novels. Its readership tends to have a relatively high level of education.

One notable publication from the Writers Publishing House was the 2000 book Harvard Girl, which spent 16 months at the number-one position on China's bestseller list and sold over 3 million copies.
