= Evolutionary approaches to postpartum depression =

For evolutionary theory, postpartum depression is of interest due to its relatively high rates and seemingly universal expression, which may provide evidence of functionality.

== Background ==
Postpartum depression (PPD), from Latin post partum (after birth), also known as perinatal depression, is a mood disorder which may be experienced by pregnant or postpartum women. Symptoms include extreme sadness, low energy, anxiety, crying episodes, irritability, and extreme changes in sleeping or eating patterns. PPD can also negatively affect the newborn child.

Although the exact cause of PPD is unclear, it is believed to be due to a combination of physical, emotional, genetic, and social factors such as hormone imbalances and sleep deprivation. Risk factors include prior episodes of postpartum depression, bipolar disorder, a family history of depression, psychological stress, complications of childbirth, lack of support, or a drug use disorder. Diagnosis is based on a person's symptoms. While most women experience a brief period of worry or unhappiness after delivery, postpartum depression should be suspected when symptoms are severe and last over two weeks.

Depression occurs in roughly 10 to 20% of postpartum women. Postpartum depression commonly affects mothers who have experienced stillbirth, mothers who live in urban areas, and adolescent mothers. Moreover, this mood disorder is estimated to affect 1% to 26% of new fathers. A different kind of postpartum mood disorder is postpartum psychosis, which is more severe and occurs in about 1 to 2 per 1,000 women following childbirth. Postpartum psychosis is one of the leading causes of the murder of children less than one year of age, which occurs in about 8 per 100,000 births in the United States.

== Mismatch hypothesis ==
One of the explanations of postpartum depression is framed by the changes in human lifestyles in recent history. Hahn-Holbrook and Haselton review a number of lifestyle shifts that have affected humans since the development of agriculture. First, most people today consume grain-fed domesticated animal products rather than wild-caught animals. Unlike wild animals, domesticated animals have much lower levels of omega-3 fatty acids, which are essential to brain development and to fetal health. In support of the theory that postpartum depression may be related to modern diets, the authors find that rates of postpartum depression are lower in countries that consume higher amounts of seafood, which contain high levels of omega-3 fatty acids.

This hypothesis is weakened by the known poor reliability of measures of postpartum depression in Asian samples, which often return low rates of postpartum depression in countries including Japan. Emerging evidence suggests that postpartum depression may be just as common in these samples, but is experienced differently and is not detected by measures including the Edinburgh Postnatal Depression Scale. Furthermore, a direct randomized control trial found no effect of supplementary omega-3 fatty acids in women with postpartum depression.

The authors also review the relationship between breastfeeding and postpartum depression. They do not specifically explore the child loss hypothesis, discussed above [Discussed where?], but instead examine evidence that breastfeeding is related to stress regulation and reduces negative affect, offering a buffer against the risk of postpartum depression. However, since most studies are cross-sectional the direction of this effect is yet to be determined as it may be that depressed women are less likely to breastfeed than non-depressed women.

Finally, the authors review evidence that lower rates of exercise and sun-exposure, common in Western lifestyles, have also been found to be related to postpartum depression. However, evidence is mixed. These hypotheses would be easy to test in randomized controlled trials, in which supplementary exercise and Vitamin D could be administered to test samples. However, evidence from direct trials is also mixed.

One of the more commonly cited mismatch hypotheses relates to changes in family networks and childcare routines. Hunter-gatherer families often live with their extended families and regularly share childcare duties, whereas Western families may live very far from their relatives and therefore must meet the demands of childcare themselves. This likely causes additional stress and anxiety in new parents, who do not have access to assistance from their family members. This aspect of the hypothesis is more difficult to test, as the relationship between family assistance and postpartum depression is likely more complicated.

== Psychological pain hypothesis ==
Another explanation of postnatal depression is focused on the crux of reproductive decision-making in humans, which is twofold. Firstly, there is a tradeoff between present and future offspring. In life-history theory, organisms have limited reproductive energy which requires that trade-offs be made when choosing to invest in one infant over another or over additional mating opportunities. Secondly, there is a tradeoff between the quantity and quality of offspring.

Because women's reproduction is more constrained than men's by obligate energetic demands, women experience higher risks relative to decisions to invest or not invest. As such, a mechanism which served to signal to women that they faced a bad investment opportunity, would be evolutionarily adaptive. For instance, in modern, industrialized societies where mortality is low, parents are incentivized to invest more per child than parents who live in less stable environments or utilizing riskier subsistence strategies. See life history theory.

For example, Bereczkei et al. found that women in Hungary with higher rates of low birth-weight infants had shorter inter-birth intervals, corresponding to an additional 2–4 years of potential reproduction. These women had significantly more children by the end of their reproductive careers than women who did not have low birth-weight children, pointing to a tradeoff between offspring quantity and quality.

In this vein, some researchers hypothesized that postpartum depression is more likely to occur in mothers who are suffering a fitness cost, in order to inform them that they should reduce or withdraw investment in their infants. Support for this hypothesis was found in a population of hunter-horticulturalists, the Shuar, located in the Ecuadorian Amazon. Reasons for this could include lack of paternal or other social support, poor infant health, or birth complications, all of which are commonly associated with postpartum depression. Hagen also found support that postpartum depression could function as a bargaining strategy, in which parents who were not receiving adequate support from their partners withdrew their investment in order to elicit additional support. In support of this, Hagen found that postpartum depression in one spouse was related to increased levels of child investment in the other spouse. Furthermore, support was also found for a reduction in rates of postpartum depression for older women with few future reproductive opportunities. Another study reported similar findings.

== Suggested adaptive qualities and relationship to reduced fertility ==
There is a reproductive cost to experiencing postpartum depression which likely affects future reproductive strategies and child-spacing decisions. Specifically, it has been found that women who experienced postpartum depression with their first or second birth had reduced likelihood of parity progression to a third birth, and lower completed fertility overall. Hagen and Thornhill argue that limiting complete family size is one method of reducing parental investment in poor circumstances. Furthermore, they found evidence that poor maternal condition at birth one was highly correlated with poor condition at subsequent births, as such it could be the poor condition, not postpartum depression that drives lower fertility.

== See also ==
- Evolutionary approaches to depression
- Evolutionary psychology of parenting
