= Evolutionary psychology of parenting =

Psychological adaptations in men and women

Due to not carrying the child, the male is suggested to experience paternal uncertainty.

Different parenting styles across cultures also influence the temperament of an offspring. Additionally, varying attachment styles can influence the development of an offspring, impacting their future choices on their own mates and parenting skills.

Such parental influences lead to the theories of inclusive fitness as well as parental investment in illustrating the roots of parenting styles relayed upon offspring, such as to ensure the parents' reproductive success as well as their fitness through resources that which offspring obtain when making mating choices.

== Gender differences ==
=== Maternal role ===
According to the parental investment theory, mothers are inclined to provide optimal care for their offspring due to the certainty of a genetic relationship. In regards to this, polyandry is rare in most societies as women will not take more than one husband in order to ensure the father with knowledge of the child's paternity and assistance with future care of their child from the father. Brain circuitry also evolved to favor monogamous attachment around the same time that our ancestors developed upright bipedal abilities. The development of upright movement led to the development of females caring for their children by carrying infants in their arms instead of on their backs.

Holding their infants in their arms led to greater bonds between mother and child. Upright bipedal abilities also developed stronger pairing-bonds between males and females as it became easier for males to protect just one female on the land instead of multiple females as they had done while living in trees. Natural selection favored males and females who had genes regulated towards forming pair-bonds because their young were more likely to survive, and brain circuitry gradually evolved to include attachment in parenting styles.

Women have adapted the ability to recognize infant facial expression of emotion, most especially negative emotion. This adaptation allows for the primary caretaker to develop a bond with their child leading to secure attachment during development. The "tend-and-befriend" hypothesis, which allows for the mother to care for and protect the child during detrimental situations, ensures offspring survival. Women are also able to create and maintain social networks that offer social protection for their offspring.

Grandmothers have evolved mechanisms that allow them to invest in their grandchildren. Menopause might be an adaptation for older women to invest in care of their offspring and their children's offspring. A desire to improve inclusive fitness allows grandmothers, especially maternal grandmothers, to invest the most since they are guaranteed that the child carries their genes. Aunts will also invest more than uncles. Specifically maternal aunts will invest more than paternal aunts.

=== Paternal role ===
Males have less investment in potential offspring and are generally less adept in their nurturing skills due to a greater emphasis on genetic reproduction, because any children that their mate births may or may not be their own. This phenomenon is termed paternal insecurity. However, "Human males do spend a lot of time investing in their kids and they invest quite heavily...That is a sharp contrast with other mammals, including our closest primate kin." Research has shown that for this reason, fathers tend to invest more resources in children that look and smell like them. Studies have demonstrated that when an infant is first born, males will experience decreased testosterone levels, making them less likely to be abusive, to commit infidelity, or seek divorce. Increased levels of investment when a child is first born may be due to the fact that males want to protect their genes and assure the reproductive success of their offspring in order for their genes to be spread.

Human fathers are involved with their family life as social connections are beneficial and alleviate access to resources. Long term monogamous relationships between parental units are necessary for children's improved development. From an evolutionary perspective, the well-being of children during their development improves the probability of reproduction for the child, and therefore the continuation of the father's genes. Evolutionary perspectives do not see the behavior of fathers who abandon their families, solely based on passing down genetic information, but also through a social perspective as father involvement is an adaptation that has been shaped by the environment and experiences.

In the modern case of divorce, fathers may feel less obliged to care for their children if guardianship of the child or children is granted to the mother, leading men to feel as if they do not need to be involved in the upbringing of their child. Remarrying, entering new romantic relationships, and having children with other women may also lead to fathers detracting from their parental investment towards their first born children. Divorced men finding new reproductive partners overrides their parental investment, as they naturally focus on spreading their genes as widely as possible.

== Influence on offspring in mate selection ==
This is an emerging field of much interest.

Mating adaptations, such as competition for females, can be rooted in evolution, due to them being receivers of "scarce reproductive resources". Therefore, males' nature to involve themselves in competition can be traced to their desire to have genes passed down while using the females resources. The parent who willfully invests in their offspring, is then in control of an offspring's mating choices, specifically those of their daughters. According to Robert Trivers' theory of parental investment, the parent which commits to greater investment in an offspring will have greater investment in the mate choices of their children, in order to assure that their engaged parenting will not be wasted on a mate who will not lead to successful reproduction and a loss of their genes being passed down.

Parents play a significant role in determining the offspring's future mates, with greater influence on daughters.

In the ancestral environment, parents of young women recognized the power they possessed in assisting the selection of their daughter's mate and utilizing that power (either as main resource provider or through physical intimidation) to benefit and enhance their own inclusive fitness. Not only do parents have an influence on their offspring's mating choices, they also have an influence on the sexual strategies they adopt.

According to David Buss, a father's absence in early childhood directly affects the sexual strategy that a person will adopt later on. Those who experience a lack of a fatherly role during development may develop insecure attachment expectations that parental resources are not reliable and develop the idea that adult pair bonds do not last, leading them to develop sexual strategies that involve early sexual maturation, early sexual initiation, and frequent partner switching. This corresponds to a so-called r-strategy. Those who grew up with the presence of a father or fatherly role in their life have greater secure attachment and view people as generally reliable and trustworthy. They believe that relationships are expected to last, therefore developing a long-term mating strategy. These people delay in sexual maturation, later onset of sexual activity, search for securely attached long-term adult relationships, and heavy investment in a smaller number of children. Accordingly, modern conditions are easily seen to massively select against such traits and those that harbor them.

== See also ==
- Cinderella effect
- Parental investment § Trivers' parental investment theory
- Life history theory
- Differential K theory
- Evolutionary approaches to postpartum depression
- Evolutionary psychiatry
