= Battle Hymn of the Tiger Mother =

2011 book by Amy Chua

- Author: Amy Chua
- Language: English
- Subject: Family and parenting
- Genre: Education, parenting, memoir
- Publisher: Penguin Group
- Publication date: 2011
- Publication place: United States
- Pages: 240
- ISBN: 978-1-59420-284-1

Battle Hymn of the Tiger Mother is a book by American author and law professor Amy Chua that was published in 2011. It quickly popularized the concept and term "tiger mother".

== Summary ==
The complete blurb of the book reads: "This is a story about a mother, two daughters, and two dogs. This was supposed to be a story of how Chinese parents are better at raising kids than Western ones. But instead, it's about a bitter clash of cultures, a fleeting taste of glory, and how I was humbled by a thirteen-year-old."

An article published under the headline "Why Chinese Mothers Are Superior" in The Wall Street Journal on January 8, 2011, contained excerpts from her book in which Chua recounts her efforts to give her children what she describes as a traditional, strict, Chinese, Confucian-style upbringing. The piece was controversial, as many readers believed that Chua was advocating the superiority of a particular, very strict, ethnically defined approach to parenting. In response, Chua has stated that the book was not a "how-to" manual, but rather a self-mocking memoir. She defines "Chinese mother" loosely to include parents of other ethnic backgrounds who practice traditional, strict child-rearing while also acknowledging that "Western parents come in all varieties" and that not all ethnically Chinese parents necessarily practice strict child-rearing techniques.

Chua also reported that in one study of 48 Chinese immigrant mothers, the vast majority "said that they believe their children can be 'the best' students, the notion that 'academic achievement reflects successful parenting', and that if children did not excel in school, then there was 'a problem' in the household and the parents 'were not doing their job'." Chua contrasts them with the view she labels "Western" – that a child's self-esteem is paramount.

Chua employs the term "Tiger Mother" to describe a mother who is a strict disciplinarian. In one extreme example, Chua mentioned that she had called one of her children "garbage", a translation of a term her own father called her on occasion in her family's native Hokkien dialect. Particularly controversial was the "Little White Donkey" anecdote, where Chua described how she got her unwilling younger daughter to learn a very difficult piano song: "I hauled Lulu's dollhouse to the car and told her I'd donate it to the Salvation Army piece by piece if she didn't have 'The Little White Donkey' perfect by the next day. When Lulu said, 'I thought you were going to the Salvation Army, why are you still here?' I threatened her with no lunch, no dinner, no Christmas or Hanukkah presents, no birthday parties for two, three, four years. When she still kept playing it wrong, I told her she was purposely working herself into a frenzy because she was secretly afraid she couldn't do it. I told her to stop being lazy, cowardly, self-indulgent and pathetic." They then "work[ed] right through dinner" without letting her daughter "get up, not for water, not even for bathroom breaks". The anecdote concludes by describing how her daughter was "beaming" after she finally mastered the piece and "wanted to play [it] over and over".

== Reviews ==
The Wall Street Journal article generated a huge response, both positive and negative. American political scientist Charles Murray argued "large numbers of talented children everywhere would profit from Chua's approach, and instead are frittering away their gifts—they're nice kids, not brats, but they are also self-indulgent and inclined to make excuses for themselves". In a poll on the Wall Street Journal website regarding Chua's response to readers, two-thirds of respondents voted that the "Demanding Eastern" parenting model is better than the "Permissive Western" model. Allison Pearson remarked in The Daily Telegraph, "Amy Chua's philosophy of child-rearing may be harsh and not for the fainthearted, but ask yourself this: is it really more cruel than the laissez-faire indifference and babysitting-by-TV which too often passes for parenting these days?"

Columnist Annie Paul, writing for Time, describes, "[i]n the 2008 book A Nation of Wimps, author Hara Estroff Marano, editor-at-large of Psychology Today magazine, marshals evidence supporting Chua's approach: "Research demonstrates that children who are protected from grappling with difficult tasks don't develop what psychologists call 'mastery experiences' ... Kids who have this well-earned sense of mastery are more optimistic and decisive; they've learned that they're capable of overcoming adversity and achieving goals". Ann Hulbert of Slate remarked on Chua's "shocking honesty about tactics. She has written the kind of exposé usually staged later by former prodigies themselves ... [Chua] is a tiger who roars rather than purrs. That's because no child, she points out, naturally clamors for the 'tenacious practice, practice, practice' that mastery demands."

MSNBC stated that the article "reads alternately like a how-to guide, a satire or a lament". MSNBC's critical response goes on to state that "the article sounds so incredible to Western readers—and many Asian ones, too—that many people thought the whole thing was satire ... [but] aspects of her essay resonated profoundly with many people, especially Chinese Americans—not necessarily in a good way". In the Financial Times, Isabel Berwick called the "tiger mother" approach to parenting "the exact opposite of everything that the Western liberal holds dear".

David Brooks of The New York Times, in an op-ed piece entitled "Amy Chua is a 'Wimp'", wrote that he believed Chua was "coddling her children" because "[m]anaging status rivalries, negotiating group dynamics, understanding social norms, navigating the distinction between self and group—these and other social tests impose cognitive demands that blow away any intense tutoring session or a class at Yale". The Washington Post, while not as critical, did suggest that "ending a parenting story when one child is only 15 seems premature".

Others have noted that the Wall Street Journal article took excerpts only from the beginning of the book, and not from any of the later chapters in which Chua describes her retreat from what she calls "Chinese" parenting. Author Amy Gutman felt many have missed the point of Chua's book, which she described as "coming of age", and states the controversial examples shown in the book "reflect where Chua started, not who she is today, and passing judgment on her based on them strikes me as a bit akin to passing judgment on Jane Austen's Emma for her churlish behaviour to Miss Bates. Like Emma's, Chua's narrative has an arc. It's a coming-of-age story—where the one to come of age is the parent".

Jon Carroll of the San Francisco Chronicle felt the excerpts in the Wall Street Journal article failed to represent the content in Chua's book and states that "the excerpt was chosen by the editors of the Journal and the publishers. The editors wanted to make a sensation; the publishers want to sell books" but "it does not tell the whole story." A spokeswoman for the Wall Street Journal told the Columbia Journalism Review that "[w]e worked extensively with Amy's publisher, as we always do with book excerpts, and they signed off on the chosen extract in advance". Chua maintains that the Wall Street Journal "basically strung together the most controversial sections of the book. And I had no idea they'd put that kind of a title on it".

On March 29, 2011, the Wall Street Journal organized an event called "The Return of Tiger Mom" in the New York Public Library. This event discussed different aspects of child-raising, in a more nuanced and sensible manner, compared to controversy which the book had previously provoked. Amy Chua's husband, Jed Rubenfeld, and their two daughters also attended the event. Rubenfeld, who has become known as "Tiger Dad", said that he does not believe the Tiger Mom education method representative of Chinese education, but rather a more traditional old-fashioned style. He and Chua expressed a more liberal attitude compared with the Wall Street Journal's article, while still stressing the importance of discipline in a child's early years.

The book was on the New York Times bestseller list from January 30 to April 10, 2011.

=== Chua's defense ===
Chua has openly confronted criticism in print and during her book signings. In a follow-up article in the Wall Street Journal, Chua explains that "my actual book is not a how-to guide; it's a memoir, the story of our family's journey in two cultures, and my own eventual transformation as a mother. Much of the book is about my decision to retreat from the strict 'Chinese' approach, after my younger daughter rebelled at thirteen".

In an interview with Jezebel, Chua addresses why she believes the book has hit such a chord with parents: "We parents, including me, are all so anxious about whether we're doing the right thing. You can never know the results. It's this latent anxiety." In a conversation with Die Zeit, Chua says about her book: "I would never burn the stuffed animals of my children—that was a hyperbole, an exaggeration. I have intensified many situations to clarify my position". She adds that the book "was therapy for me at the time of a great defeat".

=== Reaction by Chua's daughter Sophia ===
On January 17, 2011, an open letter from Chua's older daughter, Sophia Chua-Rubenfeld, to her mother was published in the New York Post. Sophia's letter defends her parents' child-rearing methods and states that she and her sister were not oppressed by an "evil mother". She discusses some of the incidents that have been criticized as unduly harsh, and explains that they were not as bad as they sound out of context. She ends the letter saying, "If I died tomorrow, I would die feeling I've lived my whole life at 110 percent. And for that, Tiger Mom, thank you."

== In popular culture ==
The term and behavior of the "Tiger Mother" has been satirized in the online anthropomorphic animal comic strip series Kevin and Kell with the recurring characters Mei-Li Lee and her raising methods with her daughter Lin as well as in attitude, although it has been noted that she is not actually a tigress but a tabby cat who "willed" (assimilated) herself into becoming a tiger through sheer effort, and is married to a tiger.

"Bios for New York's Most Popular Tutors", a humor article by Ryan Max Riley on CollegeHumor, explicitly satirizes Amy Chua's Battle Hymn of the Tiger Mother. Tiger mom is described in the article as "the best known teacher", and among many other accomplishments, "her students achieve standardized test scores that range from perfect to perfect with less bruising and blood loss but the same amount of shame". The "students become so proficient at piano that they can embed hidden SOS messages in songs during concert performances".

=== Neologism ===
The term tiger mom or tiger mother has been used as a neologism used to describe a tough, disciplinarian mother due to the way Amy Chua describes bringing up her children in the strict, traditional Chinese way.

=== Public reference by David Cameron ===
In a speech in January 2016, British Prime Minister David Cameron praised "tiger mums" as he laid out his strategy for tackling child poverty in the United Kingdom. In a speech he stated, "No matter how clever you are, if you do not believe in continued hard work and concentration, and if you do not believe that you can return from failure, you will not fulfill your potential. It is what the Tiger Mothers' battle hymn is all about: work, try hard, believe you can succeed, get up and try again." The Prime Minister also criticized schools that have a culture where all children are rewarded prizes and insisted that "children thrive on high expectations."

== See also ==
- Helicopter parent
- Kyōiku mama, the concept in 1960s Japanese culture
