= Kyōiku mama =

Japanese pejorative term

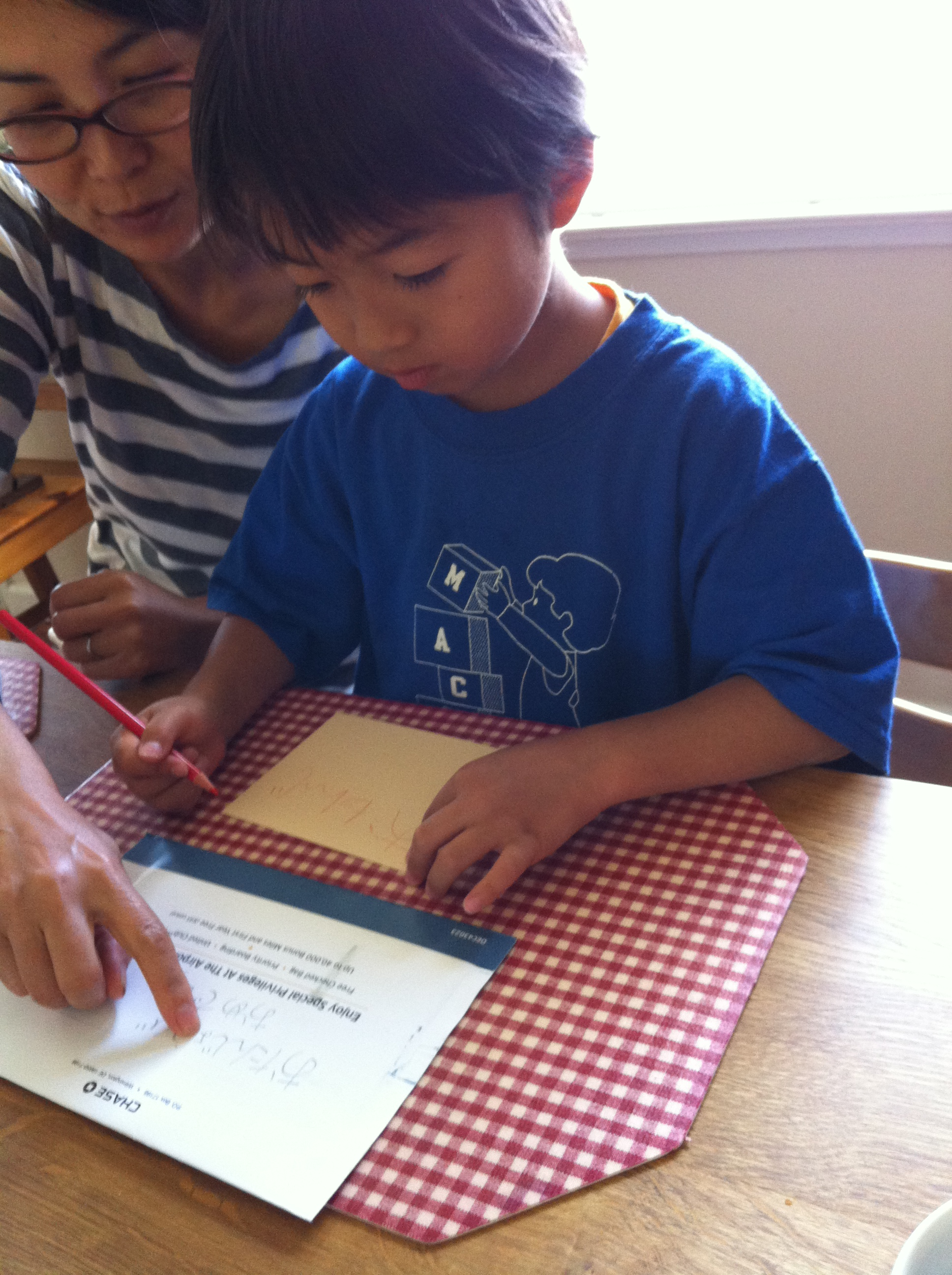
Japanese Mom and Child

Kyōiku mama (教育ママ) is a Japanese pejorative term which translates literally as 'education mother'. The kyōiku mama is a stereotyped figure in modern Japanese society, portrayed as a mother who relentlessly drives her child to study, to the detriment of the child's social and physical development, and emotional well-being.

The kyōiku mama is one of the best-known and least-liked pop-culture figures in contemporary Japan. The kyōiku mama is analogous to American stereotypes such as the stage mother who forces her child to achieve show-business success in Hollywood, the stereotypical Chinese tiger mother who takes an enormous amount of effort to direct much of her maternal influence towards developing their children's educational and intellectual achievement, and the stereotypical Jewish mother's drive for her children to succeed academically and professionally, resulting in a push for perfection and a continual dissatisfaction with anything less or the critical, self-sacrificing mother who coerces her child into medical school or law school.

The stereotype is that a kyōiku mama is feared by her children, blamed by the press for school phobias and youth suicides, and envied and resented by the mothers of children who study less and fare less well on exams.

== Factors influencing development of kyōiku mama ==
In the early 1960s, part-time women's labor began at a few major corporations in Japan and was adopted by other companies within a decade. It became popular among married women in the 1970s and even more so by 1985.

Women's return to the workplace is often explained two-fold: by financial demands to complement the family budget, and by psychological demands to relate themselves to society.

Child-rearing women in the 1960s inspired the media to produce the idiom kyōiku mama, which referred to "the domestic counterpart of sararii-man" (salaryman). This encompassed a major responsibility to "rear children, especially the males, to successfully pass the competitive tests needed to enter high school and college". No such idiom emerged that deemed men "education papas"; it was "mamas" who became a social phenomenon.

=== The education system ===
The education system and larger political economy it serves influence why mothers become obsessed with children's education. Social prejudices influence media stereotypes of kyōiku mamas that blame women rather than political conditions. Getting a good, steady job in the future very much depends on getting into a good university, which depends on attaining high scores on the national university exams in a student's last year of high school. Ordinary people, including mothers, feel powerless to change this system.

As a result, there is a clear map pointing students to the right nursery school that leads to the right kindergarten, the best elementary school, junior high school, and high school, all of which may be associated with prestigious universities. To ensure these results, some parents have been known to commit unethical or illegal acts to promote their child's success.

In one case, a restaurant owner paid a $95,000 bribe in an attempt to get his child enrolled in Aoyama Gakuin, a prestigious kindergarten for children who are three or four years old. Because of the kindergarten's affiliation with an elite university, parents are willing to go to extreme lengths to get their children enrolled. Aoyama Gakuin has room for 40 new students a year. Every year, it receives more than 2000 hopeful applicants. The tests the potential students take are known to be extremely difficult.

The issue is compounded by the notion that most important job positions in business and government are held by graduates of the University of Tokyo. In addition, which university a student attends is believed to affect one's choices for a future spouse. Because a child's life appears to be determined by what schools he or she attends, many mothers take extraordinary measures to get children into good schools.

=== Changing family structures ===
The older generation of Japanese grew up in larger households than those normally found in Japan today. Back then, ikuji (育児, "child-raising") included a larger surrounding environment, made up of more relatives and extended family, and more children: siblings and cousins. Children who grew up in that time learned responsibilities through the care of younger siblings. These children relied on themselves in the outside world through much of their childhood lives. In those days, child-raising was more of a private matter, handled only by the child's surrounding family.

In the 1970s, men's wages decreased and women left home earlier to find jobs. These women "considered themselves free" after the child's junior high education. The previous generation did not feel this until after the child had finished high school.

In contemporary Japan, couples are having fewer children and teaching the children self-reliance. This involves consulting child-raising professionals. This new need in professional advice is commonly termed "child-raising neurosis" by professionals. Reliance on professionals has largely created a new generation of young mothers with low self-confidence in their child-raising abilities. Indeed, most Japanese mothers today grew up in smaller families with only one or two children. Their mothers provided them with everything they needed and gave them little to no responsibilities involving their siblings. Thus, that generation of children has grown up to become mothers who have no idea how to raise their children.

In addition, in contemporary Japan there are mothers who completely devote themselves to child-raising. Another subtype, described by Nishioka Rice, is the kosodate mama (子育てママ), who adds psychosociological elements into child-raising. In addition to providing for her a good education, she develops an emotional and psychological relationship with her children. One way to do this is through "skinship"—being in constant close physical contact with her children. This could, for example, involve carrying her child on her back wherever she goes or bathing with her children every night. Through skinship, ittaikan (一体感) is achieved, a "one-ness and balanced, positively valenced dependency" between mother and child.

=== Societal views ===
In Japan, a mother who works is commonly seen as selfish in a society where child-raising is linked directly with the physical closeness between mother and child. This emphasis can be a cause of the development of a kyōiku mama who always worries about her children's education success. This produces children that society views as lacking self-reliance, antisocial, and selfish.

When compared to American mothers, Japanese mothers have a stronger belief in effort as opposed to innate ability. Japanese children see their efforts as necessary to fulfill a social obligation to family, peers, and community. Children are forced to focus on their effort, seeing it as the cause of success. According to society, if a child does not succeed, they were not trying hard enough. This is unrelated to the child's grades; children always need to put forth more effort. Mothers pressure children because they are held strongly accountable for their children's actions.

It is very hard to find daycare in some parts of Japan, and it is socially looked down upon if a mother sends her child to one. The mother is seen as insufficient, not having the skills to raise a child on her own, or selfish, giving her child over to a caretaker while she pursues her own separate goals.

The term kyōiku mama became used in other similar contexts. For example, the former Ministry of International Trade and Industry was dubbed kyōiku mama for its approach and initiatives in guiding industrial growth, in a manner similar to the definition of a nanny state.

=== Media ===
Housewives are surrounded by popular media that encourages their actions. Daytime television, magazines, products, and services for mothers are largely focused on improving the home and raising the children. Thus, the job of motherhood is taken very seriously by mothers in Japan. A common description of a mother's free time is “three meals and a nap.”

=== Class distinctions ===
Kyōiku mamas, preparatory preschools, and heavily academic curricula exist in Japan, yet they are relatively rare and concentrated in urban, wealthy areas. Kyōiku mamas are prominent in the middle classes. Middle-class women train the children, the next generation of the middle class.

In the post-World War II era in Japan, the mother was the creator of a new child-centered world stamped with middle-class values. The mother was linked with the success of the child's education. A woman was expected to be a "good wife, wise mother" and became the single most important figure in raising the child to become a successful future adult. Mothers needed to put their efforts into raising and teaching their children. Through self-cultivation and rearing of the children, the woman was crucial to a family's ability to claim a place in the so-called middle stratum.

As education credentials became the recognized prerequisite to social advancement in the early 20th century, kyōiku mama actively looked to the education system, especially admission into middle school for boys and higher school for girls, to help improve the family's social position. The competition to pass the entrance examination to middle school and girls' higher school became intense, creating the social phenomenon known as shiken jigoku (試験地獄): examination hell. While risshin shusse (立身出世), or rising in the world, was the clarion call of the mass of the middle class, there was no risshin shusse without a kyōiku mama. For the education mother, making the child into a superior student was a concern that began with the child's entrance into elementary school at age six and extended to all aspects of the child's education.

Working-class mothers are not as intensely active in their children's education as middle-class mothers. An ethnographic study by Shimizu Tokuda (1991) portrayed one middle school that faced persistent academic problems in a working-class neighborhood of Osaka. The study illustrated efforts by teachers to improve the student's academic performance: providing tests, promoting monthly teacher discussions, painting walls to enhance the study environment, and restricting hours spent in extracurricular activities. While students' enrollment in high school slightly improved, academic achievement level remained lower than the national average. This study revealed that students' academic problems were deeply related to their home environments. Most students had parents who were uneducated and not involved in their children's education.

== American view ==
In contrast to Japan's mostly negative images of kyōiku mamas, American leaders who put forth the image of "superhuman Japan" to boost American education performance extolled Japan's education-minded mothers. Both of Ronald Reagan's education secretaries focused attention on Japanese mothers as mirrors to improve American families and schools. Reagan's first Secretary of Education, Terrel Bell (credited for the wording of A Nation at Risk) wrote an enthusiastic foreword to Guy Odom's Mothers, Leadership and Success—a book whose basic point was that only vigorous, aggressive and intelligent Super Moms exemplified by Japanese mothers could reinvigorate America. William J. Bennett, head of the Department of Education in Reagan's second term, praised Japan's "one parent on the scene" who "stays in touch with the teachers, supervises the homework, arranges extra instructional help if needed, and buttresses the child's motivation to do well in school and beyond".

== Contemporary kyōiku mamas ==
Many Japanese mothers dedicate much time to get their children from one entrance exam to another. At the national university entrance exams, held in Tokyo, most mothers travel with their children to the examination hall. They arrive and stay at a nearby hotel, grilling their children on last-minute statistics and making sure that they are not late to the exam.

Some mothers are beginning their children's education at even younger ages. A 30-year-old mother in Japan says, "This is my first baby, and I didn't know how to play with her or help her develop". She sends her 6-month-old daughter to a pre-pre-school in Tokyo. A headmaster at another pre-pre-school claims that the school, for children one year or older, helps to nurture and develop the children's curiosity through "tangerine-peeling or collecting and coloring snow".

Mothers are essentially in heavy competition with other mothers who want their children to get into the elite universities. In some cases, to make it seem like her own child is not studying as much, mothers will let their child use the parents' bedroom to study while the mothers watch television in the living room. Other mothers who pass by the house will see the child's bedroom light off, assuming that the child has shirked his or her studies to watch television. The next morning, the mother will report what happened on the shows to her child, who will go to school and talk about it to his or her classmates, who will also assume that their friend is a slacker, lowering their expectations of their friend and for themselves. However, when examination time rolls around, the "slacker" will be admitted into an elite school while his or her friends will drop behind.

Kyōiku mamas often give their children a big first appearance in the neighborhood through a kōen debyū (公園デビュー), where the mothers "parade their offspring around the neighborhood parks for approval".

Mothers send their children to cram schools (juku), where children may stay until 10 or 11pm. Japan has over 35,000 cram schools for college examinations. In addition to cram schools, children are sent to calligraphy, keyboard, abacus, or kendo classes. As revealed by Marie Thorsten, moral panics about juku and education mamas occurred at the same time, in the 1970s. "As 'second schools', the juku, as consumer services, appealed to mothers’ anxieties about their children, shaping the image of the 'normal' mother as one who sends her children to juku and stays up to date with commercialized trends in examination preparation."

== Effects on children ==
In the 1950s, full-time mothers devoted themselves to a smaller number of children. Parental stress resulted in the commonality of new childhood problems; these include bronchial asthma, stammering, poor appetite, proneness to bone fractures, and school phobia. Children were aware they were their mother's purpose in life. Mothers played the role of their children's school teachers while they were at home.

Sometimes, a child who grows up with a kyōiku mama turns into a tenuki okusan (手抜き奥さん, "hands-off housewife"). This stereotype describes women who typically have jobs and are not around the children as much, essentially becoming the female version of the stereotypical absent Japanese father, a "leisure-time parent" or "Sunday friend". These mothers are said to not do a lot of homemaking, commonly making large, freezable meals that are easy to reheat in case they are not home or too busy to do the cooking. They do not attempt to represent their families in the community through participation in their children's school PTA and other community functions.

Compared to modern American children, Japanese youths have less drug use, depression, violence, and teenage pregnancy, although these may be caused due to harsher laws and intrinsic social values in the Japanese culture.

== Government regulations ==
The Ministry of Education, Culture, Sports, Science and Technology has admitted that the education system and parental pressure are taking their toll on children. Education reforms that the Ministry of Education has enacted beginning in the 1970s have challenged Japan's egalitarian school system. To decrease academic pressure among students from examination competition, the Ministry of Education cut school hours and increased non-academic activities such as recess and clubs in elementary and junior high schools.

In 2002, the central government reduced school hours again, decreased content, and introduced a new curriculum at all public elementary schools to encourage individual students' learning interests and motivation. The Japanese Ministry of Education published a white paper stating that children do not have opportunities such as "coming into contact with nature, feeling awe and respect for life, and experiencing the importance of hard work learning from difficulties".

== Japanese education and related stress ==
Post-war Japan in the 1950s made it a "national mission to accelerate its education program. Children of this era had to distinguish themselves from peers at an early age if they hoped to get into a top university. Entrance exams for these children began in kindergarten.

By the mid-1970s, pressure to achieve in children created the need for specialty schools. Seventy percent of students continued their long school day at juku or "cram schools".

In the 1980s, a series of suicides linked to school pressures began. Elementary and middle school students took their lives after failing entrance exams.

During the 1990s, the economic collapse in Japan following its global economic dominance in the previous decade led to a loss of motivation by students. The once highly touted academic ratings of Japan in math and science fell behind those of American levels. The stress began to lead to classroom disruption.

In 2001, the National Education Research Institute found that 33 percent of teachers and principals polled said that they had witnessed a complete breakdown of class "over a continuous period" due to defiant children "engaging in arbitrary activity". In 2002, the Japanese Education Ministry — pressured by the need to reform — eliminated 30 percent of its core curriculum. This freed up time for students to learn in groups according to the students' chosen path.

The use of the term mukatsuku, meaning "irritating and troublesome", has been rising in use among students as a description of the feelings they experience of being fed up with teachers, parents, and life.

== See also ==
- Education in Japan
- Helicopter parent
- Hong Kong children
- Tiger parenting, a similar parenting style in mainland China and other parts of East Asia, South Asia and Southeast Asia
- Soccer mom
