= The Little White Donkey =

Piece for piano

The Little White Donkey (Le petit âne blanc) is a piece for piano by the French composer Jacques Ibert.

It is the second piece from his suite of 10 pieces called Histoires, written in 1922, and is in the key of F♯ major.

It was later orchestrated. It is frequently taught to children learning to play the piano, and is known for its staccato texture.
