= Reflective parenting =

Theory of parenting

Reflective Parenting is a theory of parenting developed from the work of psychoanalyst Peter Fonagy and his colleagues at the Tavistock Clinic in London. Fonagy introduced the concept of “reflective functioning”, which is defined as the ability to imagine mental states in self and others. Through this capacity for reflection, we develop the ability to understand our own behavioral responses and the responses of others as a meaningful attempt to communicate those inner mental states. As Fonagy describes it, “reflective function is the… uniquely human capacity to make sense of each other”.

Numerous researchers have studied how reflective functioning works in the parent-child relationship. They have learned that a mother with high reflective functioning has the ability to see her child as a separate, autonomous individual with “a mind of his own.” As a result, she attributes thoughts, feelings, intentionality and desires to her child, and can recognize her own thoughts, feelings, intentions and desires. This research has demonstrated that when a parent has this capacity, it 1) strengthens the parent-child relationship 2) teaches the child how to understand and regulate his behavior, and 3) supports cognitive development.

Arietta Slade and her colleagues at Yale Child Study Center, John Grienenberger and his team at the Wright Institute in Los Angeles, Daniel Schechter and his colleagues at Columbia University and Alicia Lieberman and Patricia Van Horn at UC San Francisco are some of the first researchers and clinicians in the United States to use this research to develop reflective parenting programs and interventions. These programs share a common focus; to develop and enhance parents’ capacity for reflective thinking. They teach parents to understand and respond to a child’s motivations instead of her actions, in the belief that reflection is more productive for healthy family relationships than addressing specific actions.
