= Princess sickness =

East Asian derogatory term for perceived entitled or materialistic behavior

Princess sickness, also referred to as princess complex, princess syndrome, or princess disease (Chinese: 公主病; pinyin: gōngzhǔ bìng; Cantonese Yale: gūng jyú behng; Korean: 공주병; RR: gongjubyeong; Vietnamese: bệnh công chúa), is a neologism used colloquially in parts of East Asia as a derogatory label for individuals—most often women—perceived as exhibiting entitled, dependent, or materialistic behavior, or as expecting preferential treatment in interpersonal relationships.

The term is not a recognized medical or psychological diagnosis and is used informally in popular media and everyday speech. In some contexts, a comparable term may be applied to men, sometimes described as having “prince sickness,” though this usage is less common.

Commentators and researchers have linked the spread of the term to social and economic changes in East Asia, including rising living standards, consumer culture, and shifts in family dynamics during periods of rapid economic growth.

== Causes ==
In Mainland China, Hong Kong, Macau, and Taiwan, declining birth rates have resulted in many families having a single child, who may receive concentrated attention from parents and, in some cases, grandparents. In Mainland China, this situation has often been discussed in relation to the former one-child policy and is sometimes referred to as the Little Emperor Syndrome.

Commentators have linked these dynamics to parenting styles such as helicopter parenting, as well as to the use of domestic workers, particularly in middle-class households where parents work long hours. In Hong Kong, discussions of perceived entitlement have also appeared alongside broader public debates about income inequality, social mobility, and political representation.

Social mobility in much of East Asia is often linked to educational attainment and academic performance. As a result, some parents place strong emphasis on academic achievement and closely monitor their children’s schooling. Some observers suggest that these pressures may contribute to increased dependence or reduced autonomy among children, though views on this vary.

== In popular culture ==
- "Princess Syndrome" (公主病, Gōng zhǔ bìng) – a song by Taiwanese singer Jay Chou from the album Exclamation Mark.
- "Disease Princess" – a song by Japanese musician Masa.
- “Princess Disease" – a song by British power electronics group Whitehouse from the album Cruise.
- "World Is Mine" – a song by ryo of supercell using the vocal synthesizer Hatsune Miku.

== See also ==
- Black American princess
- Narcissism
- Gong nui
- Gynocentrism
- Jewish-American princess
- Little emperor syndrome
