= Parenting stress =

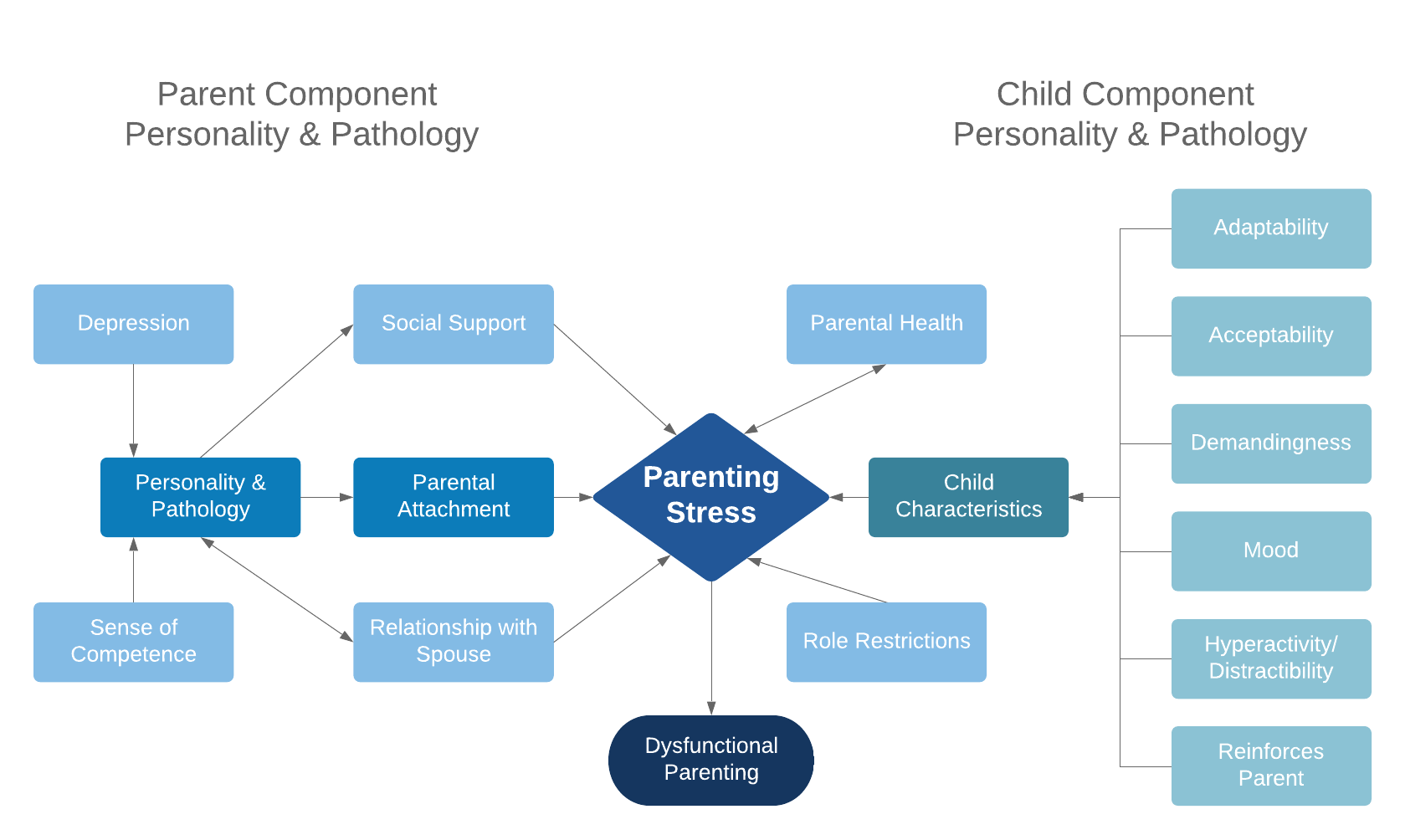
Parent and child personality and pathology factors that contribute to parenting stress.

Parenting stress also known as "parental burnout" relates to stressors that are a function of being in and executing the parenting role. It is a construct that relates to both psychological phenomena and to the human body's physiological state as a parent or caretaker of a child. Such effects can be exacerbated when the child has complex care needs such as physical, developmental, emotional or behavioural needs.

== Context ==
Unlike many stressful situations and events, parenting stressors tend to be long-term, repetitive, and can create chronic stress that manifests both in psychological and physiological ways.However,Data from the British Household Panel Survey and the German Socio-Economic Panel suggests that having up to two children increases happiness in the years around the birth, and mostly only for those who have postponed childbearing. However, having a third child is not shown to increase happiness. Data from a private opinion American survey, called Success Index, suggests that parenting is deemed important for people, especially for those aged 65 and older as compared to those aged 18 to 35. According to the survey, being a parent is now an integral part of the new American Dream. Extensive cross-cultural research has found that parenting stress is associated with parenting and child behaviors, various parenting-related cognitions, and the parent's and child's physiological states. Abidin has presented a non-exhaustive model and a measure that attempts to define the major components of parenting stress, and the impact of these stressors on parenting behavior and their child's development. The model concentrates on proximal variables related to the execution of the parenting role: the perceived behavioral characteristics of the child, the parent's self-cognitions, and their perceptions of the familial and friend support available to them. These proximal factors in turn connect with other aspects of the child's and the parent's interpersonal milieu. There are several operational definitions and ways of measuring aspects of parenting stress. Many of these have shown good reliability and criterion validity across a range of different samples, establishing evidence of generalizability. The Parenting Stress Index (PSI), the most widely used measure of parenting stress, has shown associations with a wide range of parenting behaviors and child outcomes and has been used in hundreds of published studies. Since the fourth edition of the PSI has been translated in over 30 languages, cross-cultural replications of the PSI factor structure have been published using normative samples from several countries. Copies of these measures and their test manuals may be obtained from the respective publisher. The goal is to provide a brief overview of the construct of parenting stress for a broader audience, given that the topic is likely to be of interest and importance across a wide range of medical and research contexts. Parenting is a human universal across time and culture, and the construct connects with psychological development, socialization of children, education, health (including when either person in the parent-child dyad experiences other illness or injury), and a wealth of other issues. The overview concludes with links to resources for learning more, or for incorporating measures into other programs of research.

== Description ==
The construct of parenting stress builds on the seminal works of both Selye and Lazarus. Selye demonstrated that a physiological response occurred in the body by phenomenological events like physical environmental stimuli. Although not always maladaptive, the stress in parenting is more likely to be maladaptive, especially when the stress is severe or chronic. Further, he demonstrated that, regardless of the sources of stress, the greater the number of stressors, the larger the body's physiological response. That finding suggested that parenting stress would need to be understood and measured by considering multiple variables. Lazarus articulated the connection of perceptions to emotions and subsequently to both the physiological response and the likely behavioral responses of individuals. Parenting stress thus conceived is not simply a reaction to observable events but the interpretations and other cognitions of the parent relative to the events. The Lazarus model suggests four stages of the stress reaction:

1. Recognition of an environmental demand,
2. The perception of the demand in terms of whether it is perceived as a threat,
3. Whether or not the individual believes they have the resources to cope with the event. This process is instantaneous and is essentially an unconscious response.
4. Based on stage three, the nervous system responds by either relaxing or preparing to flee or fight.

Thus, the works of Selye and Lazarus provide conceptual frameworks for understanding the links between emotion perception, stress, and coping. Multiple evidence-based measures of parenting stress have been developed.

== Research ==
Kirby Deater-Deckard, in the volume Parenting Stress, presented the first comprehensive articulation of the research on parenting stress concerning the characteristics of parents, the parent-child relationship, and parents' coping behaviors. Since Deater-Deckard's work, there has been a rapid expansion of research documenting the linkage between parenting stress and a wide variety of important issues related to family functioning and child development and behavior. The summary below provides a brief sampling to illustrate the breadth of impact parenting stress has on members of the core family system. It is an illustrative review extracting some examples from a recent more comprehensive review (with its own formal literature review search and extraction process) to concisely introduce a range of topics.

Observed Parenting Behavior

Parenting stress has been demonstrated to be predictive of abusive mother's behavior towards their children during free play and task situations, parents’ verbal harshness, demanding and controlling behaviors, and parents' level of warmth and engagement with their child. Parental stress or burnout can manifest as an "emotional distancing from their children" due to overwhelming exhaustion among other causes.

Child Development and Outcomes

Parents’ level of stress has been found to be predictive of the development of problem behaviors in children, children's aggressiveness, callous-unemotional traits in children, and children's coping competence. Barroso et al. conducted a major review and meta-analysis of the parenting stress literature, which revealed that parenting stress is a major factor with parents coping with their children's behavior.

Child Academic Functioning

Children whose parents exhibit high levels of parenting stress display difficulties in executive functioning, lower levels of academic competence, and other behavioral problems in school.

Physical Health and Physiological Issues

Parenting stress has been associated with elevated cortisol and oxytocin levels both in parents and their children. These are well-established chemical markers of an individual's mental and physical health. Mothers who exhibit high levels of parenting stress also display a failure to care for their own health needs while also overusing pediatric healthcare services for their children. Parenting stress has also been associated with parental brain functioning, epigenetic DNA methylation, and parent-child behavioral synchrony, and brain synchrony.

Compliance with Medical and Psychological Treatment

Parents with elevated stress levels have significantly higher non-compliance rates for their treatment and the medically necessary care of their children. They also are early terminators of psychological treatments for their children.

The Parenting Partner Relationship

The quality of the parents' relationship is a central variable in terms of child outcomes. The level of parenting stress experienced by parenting partners is associated with the child's physical and mental health.
