= Helicopter parent =

Parent who closely manages their child's life

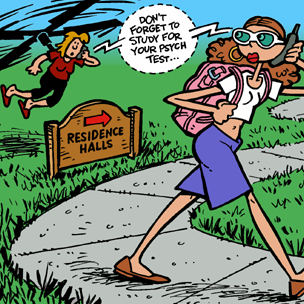
Cartoon demonstrating and making light of the term "helicopter parent"

A helicopter parent (also called a cosseting parent or simply a cosseter) is a parent considered overattentive and overly fearful for their child, particularly outside the home and at educational institutions. Helicopter parents are so named because, like helicopters, they "hover overhead", overseeing every aspect of their child's life. A helicopter parent is also known to strictly supervise their children in all aspects of their lives, including in social interactions. The term originally gained popularity regarding the behaviour of parents towards their adult children; however, in recent years, the use of term has expanded to cover parenting practices at increasingly lower ages.

== Etymology ==
The simile appeared as early as 1969 in the bestselling book Between Parent & Teenager by Dr. Haim Ginott, which mentions a teenager who complains: "Mother hovers over me like a helicopter..."

The term "helicopter parent" has been in use since the late 1980s. It subsequently gained wide currency when American academic administrators began using it in the early 2000s as the oldest millennials began reaching college age. Administrators complained about practices such as calling their children each morning to wake them up for class and complaining to their professors about grades the children had received. Summer camp administrators made similar complaints.

== Roots ==
The Chronicle of Higher Education reported that helicopter parents continued advocating for their adult children at the graduate school level as well, such as advocating for their adult child's admission to law school or business school. As this cohort entered the workforce, Human Resource officials reported helicopter parents showing up in the workplace or phoning managers to advocate on their adult child's behalf or to negotiate salaries for their adult children.

Generational demographer Neil Howe describes helicopter parenting as the parenting style of baby boomer parents of millennial children. Howe describes the helicopter parenting of baby-boomers as a distinct parenting style from Generation X parents. He describes the latter as "stealth-fighter parents" due to a tendency of Gen X parents to let minor issues go while striking without warning and vigorously in the event of serious issues. Howe contrasts this to the sustained participation of Boomer parents of Millennials in the educational setting, describing these parents as "sometimes helpful, sometimes annoying, yet always hovering over their children and making noise". Howe describes baby boomers as incredibly close to their children, saying that in his opinion, this is a good thing.

Helicopter parents attempt to "ensure their children are on a path to success by paving it for them". The rise of helicopter parenting coincided with two social shifts. The first was the comparatively booming economy of the 1990s, with low unemployment and higher disposable income. The second was the public perception of increased child endangerment, a perception which free-range parenting advocate Lenore Skenazy described as "rooted in paranoia".

Helicopter parenting is on occasion associated with societal or cultural norms that furnish or standardize themes related to vicariousness.

=== China ===
Tianjin University has been building "love tents" to accommodate parents who have traveled there with their matriculating freshmen, letting them sleep on mats laid out on the gym floor. Commentators on social media have argued that the one-child policy has been an aggravating factor in the rise of helicopter parenting (see little emperor syndrome).

=== In research ===
Helicopter parenting is a colloquial term; research often refers to the concept as overprotective parenting or overparenting. Research in the past referred to overprotective mothering, but overprotective parenting and overparenting are now favoured to include the role of fathers in parenting. Overparenting can be seen as a form of control and refers to any form of inappropriate (excessive or developmentally) involvement in a child's life from the parent. In response to its use in everyday terminology, research has recently started also using the term helicopter parenting.

== Literature ==
Madeline Levine has written on helicopter parenting. Judith Warner recounts Levine's descriptions of parents who are physically "hyper-present" but psychologically absent. Katie Roiphe, commenting on Levine's work in Slate elaborates on myths about helicopter parenting: "[I]t is about too much presence, but it's also about the wrong kind of presence. In fact, it can be reasonably read by children as absence, as not caring about what is really going on with them ... As Levine points out, it is the confusion of overinvolvement with stability." Similarly, she reminds readers that helicopter parenting is not the product of "bad or pathetic people with deranged values ... It is not necessarily a sign of parents who are ridiculous or unhappy or nastily controlling. It can be a product of good intentions gone awry, the play of culture on natural parental fears."

The Chinese parenting style depicted in the book Battle Hymn of the Tiger Mother has been compared to western helicopter parenting. Nancy Gibbs writing for Time magazine described them both as "extreme parenting", although she noted key differences between the two. Gibbs describes tiger mothers as focused on success in precision-oriented fields such as music and math, while helicopter parents are "obsessed with failure and preventing it at all costs". Another difference she described was the Tiger Mother's emphasis on hard work with parents adopting an "extreme, rigid and authoritarian approach" toward their children, which she contrasts to western helicopter parents who she says "enshrine their children and crave their friendship".

Former Stanford dean Julie Lythcott-Haims, drawing from her experiences seeing students come in academically prepared but not prepared to fend for themselves, wrote a book called How to Raise an Adult: Break Free of the Overparenting Trap and Prepare Your Kid for Success in which she urges parents to avoid "overhelping" their children.

== Effects ==
University of Georgia professor Richard Mullendore claims the mobile phone is a contributing factor for helicopter parenting. Some parents, for their part, point to rising college tuition costs, saying they are just protecting their investment or acting like any other consumer. Inter-generational research published in "The Gerontologist" observed educators and popular media lament helicopter parents who hover over their grown children, but reported "complex economic and social demands make it difficult for the Baby Boomers' children to gain a foothold in adulthood".

Clare Ashton-James, in a cross-national survey of parents, concluded that "helicopter parents" reported higher levels of happiness. Some studies suggest overprotective, overbearing, or over-controlling parents cause long-term mental health problems for their children. The description of these mental health problems may be lifelong, and their impact is comparable in scale to individuals who have suffered bereavement, according to the University College London. According to the Medical Research Council, "psychological control can limit a child's independence and leave them less able to regulate their own behaviour".

According to a 2019 national poll on children's health by the C.S. Mott Children's Hospital at the University of Michigan, one-quarter of parents surveyed say they are the main barrier to their teen's independence by not taking the time or effort to give their teen more responsibility. The national survey of nearly 900 parents found most of those with kids between 14 and 18 who conceded to helicoptering said they did it because it was just easier to do things themselves.

Although parents or proponents of helicopter parenting claim that such a restrictive and imposing parenting style may instill discipline, other analysts have claimed that there is evidence that such forms of parenting result in teenage rebellion, and may even extend into a vicenarian rebellion.

A study from Beijing Normal University found that overparenting had a detrimental effect on children's leadership skills. Another study from the University of Florida found that helicopter parenting was associated with more emotional problems, struggles with decision-making, and worse academic performance in a group of 500 students.

Statistics showed that when college students remained at home and had fewer siblings, over-parenting was more prevalent. Furthermore, parental participation, although not over-parenting, was linked to poorer confidence in students and unfavorable reactions to working situations.

Moreover, there are several college-related circumstances for the student that are connected to over-parenting. For instance, over-parenting is linked to more detrimental results, for example, poorer self-efficacy, whereas parental participation is linked to more favorable results for students, like as better social self-efficacy and graduate school goals.

== Related concepts ==
The "snowplow parent" is said to go a step further than the helicopter parent by proactively removing obstacles that their child would otherwise face. The New York Times used the term in its 2019 article on the Varsity Blues scandal. The phrase "lawnmower parent", coined by Karen Fancher of Duquesne University, has the same meaning as "snowplow parent". Psychologists have also used the term "bulldozer parent".

The trailing parent is one that follows their children to college, often leasing or buying a property nearby.

== See also ==
- Free-range parenting (parenting that purposely exercises minimal supervision over a child and allows them extended freedom in their activities)
- Monster parents (Japanese equivalent)
- Battle Hymn of the Tiger Mother
- Harvard Girl
- Kyoiku mama ("education mother")
- Parenting styles
- Paternalism
- Concerted cultivation
- Hong Kong children
- Mother (Pink Floyd song)
- "Father Knows Worst" (an episode of The Simpsons dealing with helicopter parenting)
- "Peeping Mom" (another episode of The Simpsons dealing with helicopter parenting)
- "Arkangel" (a Black Mirror episode involving helicopter parenting)
- Soccer mom
- Stage mother
- Spying
- Tiger mother
- Turning Red (A Pixar animated film involving helicopter parenting)
