= Hong Kong Kids phenomenon =

Referring to children who are regarded as spoilt and overly dependent

"Hong Kong Kids" or "Kong Kids" (Chinese: 港孩; pinyin: Gǎng Hái; Jyutping: Gong2 Haai4) is a derogatory term that refers to a stereotype of children or teenagers in Hong Kong who are said to be overly dependent on their families, have low emotional intelligence and lack self-management skills. The term was coined in 2009 in a book titled Kong Kids: The Nightmares for Parents and Teachers published by the Ming Pao newspaper. The stereotype is reinforced by anecdotal evidence from the media, but has no scientific literature to speak of.

== Description ==
The stereotypical characteristics ascribed to "Kong kids" are as follows:

1. They are typically born during the 1990s to 2000s and belong to middle-class families.
2. As young children, they often lack life skills, such as bathing, cooking, and tying shoelaces. They are used to relying on their parents and foreign domestic helpers.
3. They have a low emotional quotient (EQ): they are self-centered, and cannot control their emotions. They are usually weak in interpersonal communication. As a result, they lack basic manners and come into conflicts easily.
4. When faced with difficulty, "Kong Kids" expect others to solve the problems, because they are inexperienced with managing setbacks and have low self-esteem. "Kong Kids" are said to be unwilling or unable to solve problems by themselves. Being afraid of failure, they evade adversity.
5. "Kong Kids" often love chasing new trends and pursuing well-known brands. Most of them own brand name goods and electronic gadgets such as mobile phones, iPads, iPods, and digital cameras.

These characteristics are described to stem from the way they are brought up: their parents are said to be "monster parents". The "Kong kids" are pampered and spoiled by other family members, and fail to develop autonomy due to foreign domestic servants in the house. Additionally, the parents are said to emphasize academic results over anything else to the point that the children become "Kong kids".

== In the media ==
In December 2010, when a snowstorm paralysed the London Heathrow Airport, many Hong Kong students who came home for holidays were stranded at the airport. According to a Ming Pao article, they stayed in the banquet rooms of hotels or slept in the airport. During that period, those Hong Kong students complained continuously about the situation and that the banquet rooms were like concentration camps. At the same time, the parents strongly requested the government to assist those students. The article brands the students as "Kong kids". The article blames both the parents and the foreign domestic helpers for the behavior of the students.

A survey done by the Sing Tao Daily in 2010 "found that nearly 90% of parents hired foreign helpers to help their children". The article states this to be a cause of the creation of "Kong kids".

On 9 July 2011, a video entitled Tai Po Impolite Kong Kid Scolding Parents (大埔超級城無禮小學雞當街鬧父母) was filmed by witnesses to the incident, posted on websites like YouTube, and was reported by the media. In the three-minute video, a young boy with his hands on his hips shouted and condemned his parents for "forcing" him to accompany them to the Tai Po supermarket. He threatened to call the police and despite a surrounding crowd, spoke foul language when his parents asked him to be quiet. A passer-by, unable to stand the child's behaviour, gave the child HK$20 so that he could take a taxi home and stop harassing his parents.

== See also ==
- Education in Hong Kong
- "Four–two–one" or "4–2–1" phenomenon
- Helicopter parents
- Narcissism
- Princess sickness
- NEET
