= Educational inequality in southeast Michigan =

Educational inequality has existed in the Southeast Michigan area of the United States since the birth of institutional, urban schooling in the US. Inequality between lower and higher class districts have perpetuated divisions in educational opportunities and outcomes between Michigan communities, especially areas in and around Detroit, the state's largest city. According to a report by the Kerner Commission from 1967, "spending per pupil in Detroit suburbs was 27% greater than in the city and that spending since World War II had risen more in the suburbs than in the city. (Kerner Report 1968, 435)." More recently, the economic decline of Detroit culminating in the 2013 Detroit bankruptcy has aggravated the educational tensions.

Since it is more common for people of color to be part of the less-affluent communities with fewer educational resources, the phenomenon has also perpetuated opportunity differences between races. The Brown v. Board of Education case of 1954, which banned racial segregation in public schools, did not end this form of educational inequality. The gaps in educational inequality and acquirement negatively affect residents' development into adulthood, specifically when it comes to employment between whites and blacks. According to a study, "In 2014, employed adult black men in metropolitan Detroit earned 56% as much as their white counterparts. In 2014, employed African American women earned 75% as much as white women. Racial differences in education account for a share of the racial gap in earnings."

== Background: The impact of Detroit's collapse ==
Previously home to the Ford Motor Industry, Detroit gained recognition as the country's pinnacle of a thriving domestic labor markets. In its peak, between 1900 and 1950, Detroit's population increased exponentially, encouraging healthy economy and overall quality of life. In current times, "Detroit ranks seventy-third in median income and dead last in the value of its owner-occupied houses. It is the only city in the nation where single parents head the majority of families. And Detroit is more segregated than any other major metropolitan area," according to the Michigan Historical Review. Being that Detroit was once the bustling capital, the hub of south-eastern Michigan economy, the fall of Detroit meant trouble for surrounding areas. Worsened economy meant compromised spending in school systems, especially those that were already less-funded in comparison to more affluent districts. Scholars explain that, "where people live impacts their access to opportunities. Moreover, the geographic distribution of opportunity is particularly important for children because it impacts their schooling experiences." Being that students in poorer communities were those of color, this increased the gap between educational opportunities for white and children of color in Michigan. Black students in particular were left behind when it came to their predominantly African American school. districts.

Detroit’s schools, in the past, enrolled the majority of the state’s African American children. Those schools were viewed as so under-performing and poorly run that the state took them over in 1999. Then, in 2008, after many protested, the schools were returned to local control. Problems persisted, however, and in 2011 the state of Michigan took over again. The takeover did not improve achievement levels and generated new debts of about a half billion dollars. The state paid off those debts in 2016 and funded the creation of a new locally run school district (Gray 2016).

Since 2016, Betsy DeVos proposed a solution which funded privately operated schools, making them more accessible to students rather than attending "failing" public schools; "State-equalized support for all students ended the situation in which funding for a student's instruction was directly linked to the tax base of the student's district." The plan encouraged more residents of color, and residents in general, to attend academically apt schools.

== Impacts of race on educational inequality ==
Detroit became the final destination of many African Americans involved in The Great Migration, most of whom moved into predominantly black neighborhoods; this demographic change in Michigan's population affected the degree of segregation in all aspects, including education. Un-welcomed into white communities, African American families were forced to send their children to lower quality schools within their poorer districts, affecting educational opportunity significantly. In 1974, US Supreme Court case Milliken v. Bradley dealt with educational inequality and the accessibility of education to students of color among 50 school districts in Southeast Michigan. In conjunction with the changes that Brown v. Board of Education implemented in 1954, this court case sought to discuss the organized, segregated bussing by public schools which perpetuated racial inequality in educational systems. The court ruled that schools were, "not obligated to desegregate unless it had been proven that the lines were drawn with racist intent on the part of the districts." See Milliken v. Bradley. In short, very little changed since no solution was addressed to combat district segregation, not included in racist segregation but also a major roadblock in terms of educational inequality. State decisions like these influenced educational standards by normalizing segregation and continue to impact education today.

== Education in Southeast Michigan ==
=== Literacy rates ===
Detroit public schools have high illiteracy rates and low academic performance compared to cities across the United States; "eighth graders scored lowest in math and reading in the nation." According to the National Institute for Literacy, 47% (200,000) of adults in Detroit are functionally illiterate, and half of the 200,000 adults do not have a high school diploma or GED, showing that the lack of these skills learned in an academic setting is generationally embedded into different groups of society.

Mark Rosenbaum, a director of Public Counsel Opportunity Under Law, is concerned about the "mis-education" of America, claiming that the institution of public education constitutes a large range of inequality. Rosenbaum focuses on disadvantaged communities like Detroit, where not only almost half of the population are not functionally literate, but 40.3% also live in poverty. Little government interaction or solutions to this issue adds to the inequality of opportunity faced by public school students in Detroit, who are unable to access the education received by children who live just outside of Detroit in Livonia, Novi, or Ann Arbor.

Teacher vacancies, poor heating and cooling infrastructure, and lack of textbooks and materials are environmental features that contribute to the inequality of opportunity that exists in Detroit public schools, relating to low levels of academic achievement. This violates the constitutional rights of attending students. Public counsel and educational policy makers avoid resolving this matter as part of litigation processes, arguing that the state can't be held responsible for illiteracy.

=== Policy ===
The state of Michigan passed a law to allow teachers without proper credentials to teach in classrooms; as a result, Detroit public schools have seen an increase in teachers who hold a bachelor's degree, but no certifications related to teaching.

Racial and socioeconomic inequalities that have been worsened by educational policy changes in the 21st century are not limited to any one intersection of identities. The Latino community in Detroit has voiced their concerns in response to the impacts of changes made to standardized testing and teacher assessments in public schools. These changes were made by the Obama administration in an attempt to hold schools, teachers, and students more accountable in hope of improving achievement scores.

70% of the students who identify as Latino are also defined as economically disadvantaged, and testing scores in 2012 show rates of less than 30% proficiency in all subjects tested, a common problem in Detroit public schools. Resistance efforts made by the youth of these communities communicate that policy reforms have created the need for more police enforcement, caused overcrowding, and under-resourced classrooms in certain schools, despite their intentions. Protests and walk-outs are some forms of backlash that students have used to demonstrate their frustrations in an attempt to communicate that the policies that may work for communities with different hardships and resources do not work for them.

=== School funding ===
In Michigan, Proposal A was approved in 1994. It drastically changed funding method for public education and led to lower property taxes, reducing inequalities in per-pupil funding across local districts.

However, there are different effects among regions. In the south and west of the state, a greater percentage of local funding was supported by property tax revenues in 1989-90 than 2002–03. In addition, a smaller percentage of the total revenue was supported by the states, while that by deferral sources increased. After Proposal A was passed, less education revenue came from local sources such as local property taxes, while more came from foundation allowances from the state. This change in the sources of revenue consequently leveled the revenue across districts.

The number of students in public schools declined because families tried to search for jobs outside of the state just after the Great Recession. This outflow of workers and recession in Michigan decreased tax revenues that financially support the public schools. This downward trend has dramatically changed since 2009, and unemployment rates in Southeastern Michigan have improved from 16% in 2008 to less than 5% in 2017. This economic recovery contributed to an increase in tax revenues, and therefore it enhanced the budget for education in Michigan.

=== Inequality in funding ===
In Michigan, the inequality in per-pupil based funding has decreased after Proposal A's passage. Before Proposal A was approved, 80% of Michigan school operating funds came from local property taxes. This funding structure was the main cause of unequal funding, because property values differed across local districts. After Proposal A passed, new funding sources such as state income taxes, sales taxes, and education property taxes created another $11 billion annual fund for public school districts, which decreased the disparities in funding across local districts. As a result, the vast majority of schools were funded within a significantly narrower range in 2009. According to the House Fiscal Agency, 80% of all districts (including charter public schools) receive between $7,100 and $7,400 per student through the foundation allowance formula; 94% fell between $7,100 and $8,500 in 2010. However, if the funding per pupil in each district is considered, there is a significant difference in Southeast Michigan districts. The table below shows that the revenue per pupil in Branch was more than three times higher than that of Wayne in 2005–06.

Per-pupil funding, by school district
School district	General fund	Special education fund	Vocational education fund	Cooperative education fund	Total	Rank
Branch	531.99	1533.78	925.91	0	3011.68	1
Calhoun	253.14	1260.01	285.04	74.34	1872.53	8
Hillsdale	265.25	1278.46	193.02	0	1736.73	9
Huron	271.33	1668.85	544.2	119.4	2603.78	2
Jackson	324.70	1453.52	420	0	2198.23	4
Lenawee	390.9	1381.46	612.77	0	2385.13	3
Lewis Cass	454.91	918.64	0	539.73	1913.28	7
Livingston	241.59	1058.57	0	0	1300.16	13
Macomb	184.53	1054.74	0	0	1239.27	15
Monroe	481.74	1446.83	0	0	1928.57	6
Oakland	152.12	1063.92	227.8	0	1433.84	12
St. Clair	332.92	925.89	247.74	0	1506.55	11
St. Joseph	179.08	825.18	238.73	0	1242.99	14
Van Buren	360.7	1149.12	515.42	0	2022.24	5
Washtenaw	107.12	1481.58	0	0	1588.7	10
Wayne	75.78	834.7	0	20.51	930.99	16

=== Impact on college education gap ===
Educational inequality presents itself in the districts of Southeast Michigan as some provide exceptional schooling and opportunities while the others fall short; as a result, children in these less fortunate districts have been falling behind. According to Michigan Radio (NPR), lower-end schools receive less funding, less qualified teachers, and worse resources and infrastructure. Furthermore, turnover rates in less fortunate schools remain at an all-time high, with principals reporting the need to replace over 60% of her teachers each year. Thus resulting in either lacking numbers of teachers or less qualified teachers. These inferior educational environments are hindering the children's ability to be properly prepared to succeed in high school and continue on to college. As school districts are determined by geographical borders, the lower quality schools reside in the poorer neighborhoods. That being said, research shows that economically integrated schools will improve all children's success, creating greater opportunities to attain a college degree in the future. The Detroit Free Press claimed that the college graduation gap for low income students has reached an all-time high. Therefore, less fortunate children who attend schools in worse school districts have less of a chance to graduate college - thus significantly limiting their future opportunities. According to a database of the Detroit Free Press, various districts in Michigan have a college enrollment rate of 90%, while others have a college enrollment rate of less than 5%. Therefore, of the thousands of children enrolled in less qualified schools, only a handful even enroll in college, with even fewer actually finishing college. As a result, the cycle of poverty and these unfortunate neighborhoods continue.

=== The Detroit Public Community Schools and the charter system ===
Detroit Public Community School district is the site of the most significant federal school desegregation cases in U.S. history. The Supreme Court decision essentially reinforced racialized educational opportunities between suburban district's white students and black students in DPS. The Detroit Public Community School District replaced the prior Detroit Public Schools in 2016. Furthermore, Detroit's first school board in seven years was publicly seated in early 2017. Prior to this, the district had been under a plethora of government appointed emergency managers. Moody's investors service released a report in 2018 stating that “the Detroit Public School Community District (DPSCD) could also become a major drag on revitalization beyond downtown. Two years following a state rescue package, the district does not have the ability to address its significant capital needs.”

A charter school in Michigan is a state-supported public school operating under a contract issued by an authorizing body. Over half of the students in Detroit attend charter schools, thus, Detroit has the most for-profit charter schools in the nation. In 1994 charter schools first came into Detroit. Charter schools are held to the same standard for core curriculum as other public schools. Furthermore, “Charter school board members are public officials that have sworn a constitutional oath of office in Michigan,” according to the Michigan Department of Education. Charter schools shape the education market that is distinguished by surpassed capacity, policy-enabled choice across districts, and also with a need to fill seats or close instead. The Education Trust-Midwest's 2016 report on Michigan's charter sector states that 70% of Michigan's charters are composed of low-income minority students and they also sit at the bottom hap of the state's ranking.

=== Socioeconomic status ===
Research indicates that children from low socioeconomic households and school districts develop academic skills and some life skills more slowly than children from higher socioeconomic groups, examples being language, memory, emotional processing, and even health in adulthood. This idea is also supported by the Summer Learning Gap phenomenon, represented in a graph that shows the achievement gap that grows between high and low income students after years in school. This finding has allowed researchers to make significant connections between schooling and income status: home life during the summer is a large part of educational inequality (family environment), school does not reduce inequality in learning, but also keeps it from growing.

Inequalities in school systems that stem from socioeconomic status are shown in Southeastern Michigan, and specifically in Wayne County (Detroit). As of 2016, Detroit's poverty rate was 35.7%, with a median household income of just over $28,000. Wayne County has the highest school dropout rate in Michigan, at 15%, which is also higher than the dropout rate in the United States in general, 13%. In Detroit, “10% of students are classified as homeless and 65% of our students qualified for free and reduced lunch in the 2016-17 school year.” When a student is living in poverty and has to focus on how to meet the most basic needs of life, it is nearly impossible to pay attention in school, let alone achieve high success in their classes. Thus, places with children from lower socioeconomic status homes will be impacted differently in school by standardization methods compared to places with students from wealthier homes.

Segregation in the Southeast areas of Michigan is very prevalent is the education system. In the city of Detroit, majority of the residents in the suburb area are predominantly white, while in the actual city majority of the residents are Black. This segregation creates lack of diversity in the schools in this area. Not only does this cause racial differences is these different districts, but also affects the quality of the school itself. Most of the city's wealth lies within the suburb areas in the cities, or the “white” neighborhoods. This allows for the wealthier districts to put more money into their schools, furthering the education of their students while other, less privileged schools get left behind. In the early 2000s Detroit lost at least 25% of their population, basically causing the economic downfall of the city while the “white neighborhoods” were still thriving. This left behind business owners that had no more customers, resulting in failed business and even more abandoned buildings on top of the buildings from people leaving their homes. This is just an example of what's happening in many different areas.

== Community outreach programs ==
=== Blueprint 2020 ===
Blueprint 2020 is a Detroit-based initiative focused on helping students to excel in school and have more career options afterward. The initiative has three main goals: access to harder curriculum and accelerated programs, career academies with different programs, and a college-ready student body through common core teachings and SAT prep classes. The program also focuses on creating well-rounded students with experience in the arts, athletics, and drama. The Superintendent of Detroit Public Schools Community District who helped create the initiative saw the struggle and gap that was appearing in students with a low socioeconomic background, and created this "blueprint" to try and make a change to better those students' lives.

=== New Economy Initiative ===
Created for the greater Detroit area of Southeast Michigan, the New Economy Initiative (NEI) is a philanthropic program focused on helping and rebuilding the economy of the area by supporting local businesses. Partners which help funding and programming include the Michigan Economic Development Corporation through the state government in Lansing, the University of Michigan in Ann Arbor, and NextEnergy, a Detroit-based environmental organization. Since launching in 2007, the program has provided over $96.2 to small businesses and local entrepreneurs in the metro area.

Wayne County, which has significantly benefited from the NEI, has a high level of socioeconomic inequality, with the highest levels of poverty, but also some of the top wealthiest cities, according to some sources. Approximately $12,250 (70% of money given by NEI) has gone to Wayne County, with the hope of creating direct and indirect steady jobs (182 that directly went into the education sector). The average annual income accredited to NEI is $44,000 for each job. There is an achievement gap between low and high income parents, and while the jobs created by NEI are not in the higher brackets of income, the creation of jobs is still significant in increasing average family income. Other scholarly pieces, such as Unequal Childhoods, a book by sociologist Annette Lareau, show the different parenting styles between low- and high-income houses.

The hope is that the NEI will help areas of all counties with less economic prosperity to close the existing wealth gap that is apparent is many of the regional public and private schools. However, some reports criticize the initiative because it does not report on the long-term health of the businesses it helps start.

- Wafa Dinaro is the Executive Director of NEI, a special project of the Community Foundation for Southeast Michigan (CFSEM).

=== Teach For America ===
Work done by Teach For America in the Detroit area began in 2010. Beyond participating in the classroom, it has also been involved with community based learning events for inner-city students in the metro area, including an equestrian program for teaching students about horseback riding and horse care, book donations on African-American culture, and advocating for Latino students. The Detroit headquarters' website lists the average teacher's annual take-home salary, which was about $17,500 as of 2018, and the master's degree requirements to be a teacher in the program. The program is concerned that 81% of children from low income families do not graduate college by age 25.

While this program, and many others, have worked to lessen inequality in the region, inequality is still evident in figures from funding, achievement scores, and social mobility.

== Social mobility ==
According to the Equality of Opportunity Project, “Children's prospects of earning more than their parents have fallen from 90% to 50% over the past half century.” It is becoming increasingly difficult for children to earn more than their parents. Each additional year corresponds to a 1% decline in the number of American children who earn more than their parents. Therefore, if the level of education affects earning rates, children need to attain higher levels of education than their parents to earn similar to greater salaries than them.

Proficiency exam scores in Detroit public schools are extremely low in comparison to the rest of the county, as well as to adjacent counties. The lack of education in these areas lowers the chances of future success for local students. According to The RedPin, to achieve the "American Dream", one needs to make an income of around $42,000. People obtaining less education than an associate degree have little chance of attaining the American Dream. This differs when gender comes into play. The median income for men with associate degrees is $43,871, while women with associate degrees make substantially less at $27,122. These statistics reveal the severity of the gender inequality and pay gap that exist in the US. They also show that only men, and not women, with an associate degree, meet the margin for earning enough income to live the American Dream. At the next education level are surprising results. The median income for men with a bachelor's degree is $60,933, and only $40,003 for women with a bachelor's degree. Men with a bachelor's degree are able to attain the American Dream, while women with the same level of education fail to reach that income threshold. Inferring from this information, the average working woman in the United States needs to attain a higher level of education than a bachelor's degree, while the average working man only has to attain an associate degree to reach the American Dream.

In pockets within Southeast Michigan, high school graduation rates fluctuate between 78% and 96%. The highest high school dropout rates occur in the Detroit Public Schools Community District, and the lowest occur in Rochester Community Schools. The median household income for families living in the district of Rochester Community Schools is $80,806, while the median household income for families living in the Detroit Public Schools district is $26,127. The areas in Southeast Michigan with high median household incomes correspond to more high school graduates.

== See also ==
- Educational inequality in the United States
