= Racial achievement gap in the United States =

Overview of the US racial achievement gap in particular

The racial achievement gap in the United States are disparities in educational achievement between differing ethnic/racial groups. It manifests itself in a variety of ways: African-American and Hispanic students are more likely to earn lower grades, score lower on standardized tests, drop out of high school, and they are less likely to enter and complete college than whites, while whites score lower than Asian Americans.

There is disagreement among scholars regarding the causes of the racial achievement gap. Some focus on the home life of individual students, and others focus more on unequal access to resources between certain ethnic groups. Additionally, political histories, such as anti-literacy laws, and current policies, such as those related to school funding, have resulted in an education debt between districts, schools, and students.

The achievement gap affects economic disparities, political participation, and political representation. Solutions have ranged from national policies such as No Child Left Behind and the Every Student Succeeds Act, to private industry closing this gap, and even local efforts.

== Overview ==
Over the past 45 years, students in the United States have made notable gains in academic achievement. However, racial achievement gaps remain because not all groups of students are advancing at the same rates. Evidence of the racial achievement gaps have been manifested through standardized test scores, high school dropout rates, high school completion rates, college acceptance and retention rates, as well as through longitudinal trends. While efforts to close racial achievement gaps have increased over the years with varying degrees of success, studies have shown that disparities still exist between achievement levels of different ethnic groups.

=== Early schooling years ===
Racial achievement gaps have been found to exist before students enter kindergarten for their first year of schooling, as a "school readiness" gap. One study claims that about half the test score gap between black and white high school students is already evident when children start school. Children of Latino, Native, and African American heritage arrive to kindergarten and first grade with lower levels of oral language, reading, and mathematics skills than Caucasian and Asian American children. While results differ depending on the instrument, estimates of the black-white gap range from slightly less than half a standard deviation to slightly more than 1 standard deviation. Reardon and Galindo (2009), using data from the ECLS-K, discovered that on average, Hispanic and black students start kindergarten with math scores three-quarters of a standard deviation lower than white students, and reading scores half a standard deviation lower than white students. After six years, Hispanic-white gaps decrease by approximately a third, while black-white gaps increase by about a third. Specifically, by the end of fifth grade, the Hispanic-white gap is half a standard deviation in math and three-eighths in reading. The trends in Hispanic-white gaps are particularly intriguing due to the rapid narrowing observed between kindergarten and first grade. During this period, the estimated math gap decreases from 0.77 to 0.56 standard deviations, and the estimated reading gap decreases from 0.52 to 0.29 over roughly 18 months from the fall of kindergarten to the spring of first grade. From the spring of first grade to the spring of fifth grade, the Hispanic-white gaps show a slight narrowing to 0.50 standard deviations in math and a slight widening to 0.38 deviations in reading.

In a 2009 study, Clotfelter et al. examine test scores of North Carolina public school students by race. They found that while black-white gaps are substantial, both Hispanic and Asian students tend to gain on whites as they progress in school. The white-black achievement gap in both math and reading scores is around half a standard deviation. By fifth grade, Hispanic and white students have roughly the same math and reading scores. By eighth grade, scores for Hispanic students in North Carolina surpassed those of observationally equivalent whites by roughly a tenth of a standard deviation. Asian students surpass whites on math and reading tests in all years except third and fourth grade reading. In both fourth-grade reading and eighth-grade math, African American students are about two and a half times as likely as white students to lack basic skills and only about one-third as likely to be proficient or advanced.

In a 2006 study, LoGerfo, Nichols, and Reardon (2006) found that, starting in the eighth grade, white students have an initial advantage in reading achievement over black and Hispanic students but not Asian students. Using nationally representative data from by the National Center for Education Statistics (NCES)—the Early Childhood Longitudinal Study (ECLS-K) and the National Education Longitudinal Study (NELS:88), LoGerfo, Nichols, and Reardon (2006) find that black students score 5.49 points lower than white students and Hispanic students score 4.83 points lower than white students on reading tests. These differences in initial status are compounded by differences in reading gains made during high school. Specifically, between ninth and tenth grades, white students gain slightly more than black students and Hispanic students, but white students gain less than Asian students. Between tenth and twelfth grades, white students gain at a slightly faster rate than black students, but white students gain at a slower rate than Hispanic students and Asian students.

In eighth grade, white students also have an initial advantage over black and Hispanic students in math tests. However, Asian students have an initial 2.71 point advantage over white students and keep pace with white students throughout high school. Between eighth and tenth grade, black students and Hispanic students make slower gains in math than white students, and black students fall farthest behind. Asian students gain 2.71 points more than white students between eight and tenth grade. Some of these differences in gains persist later in high school. For example, between tenth and twelfth grades, white students gain more than black students, and Asian students gain more than white students. There are no significant differences in math gains between white students and Hispanic students. By the end of high school, gaps between groups increase slightly. Specifically, the initial 9-point advantage of white students over black students increases by about a point, and the initial advantage of Asian students over white students also increases by about a point. Essentially, by the end of high school, Asian students are beginning to learn intermediate-level math concepts, whereas black and Hispanic students are far behind, learning fractions and decimals, which are math concepts that the white and Asian students learned in the eighth grade. Black and Hispanic students end twelfth grade with scores 11 and 7 points behind those of white students, while the male-female difference in math scores is only around 2 points.

=== Standardized test scores ===
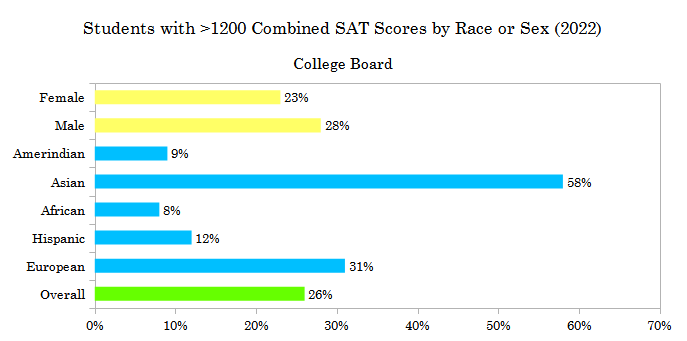
Significant sex and race differences exist in SAT scores

The racial group differences across admissions tests, such as the SAT, ACT, GRE, GMAT, MCAT, LSAT, Advanced Placement Program examinations and other measures of educational achievement, have been fairly consistent. Since the 1960s, the population of students taking these assessments has become increasingly diverse. Consequently, the examination of ethnic score differences has been more rigorous. Specifically, from six large surveys conducted between 1965 and 1992, the largest gap exists between white and African American students. On average, they score about .82 to 1.18 standard deviations lower than white students in composite test scores. Following closely behind is the gap between white and Hispanic students. The overall performance of Asian American students was higher than that of white students, except Asian American students performed one quarter standard deviation unit lower on the SAT verbal section, and about one half a standard deviation unit higher in the GRE Quantitative test. In the current version of the SAT, Asian-American students of Taiwanese, Korean, Japanese, Indian and Han Chinese descent have scored higher on both the verbal and math sections of the new SAT test than whites and all other student racial groups.

The National Assessment of Educational Progress reports the national Black-White gap and the Hispanic-White Gap in math and reading assessments, measured at the 4th and 8th grade level. The trends show that both gaps widen in mathematics as students grow older, but tend to stay the same in reading. Furthermore, the NAEP measures the widening and narrowing of achievement gaps on a state level. From 2007 to 2009, the achievement gaps for the majority of states stayed the same, although more fluctuations were seen at the 8th grade level than the 4th grade level.

The Black-White gap demonstrates:

- In mathematics, a 26-point difference at the 4th grade level and a 31-point difference at the 8th grade level.
- In reading, a 27-point difference at the 4th grade level and a 26-point difference at the 8th grade level.

The Hispanic-White gap demonstrates:

- In mathematics, a 21-point difference at the 4th grade level and a 26-point difference at the 8th grade level.
- In reading, there is a 25-point difference at the 4th grade level and a 24-point difference at the 8th grade level (NAEP, 2011).

The National Educational Longitudinal Survey (NELS, 1988) demonstrates similar findings in their evaluation of assessments administered to 12th graders in reading and math.

==== Mathematics ====
Results of the mathematics achievement test:

White-African American gap

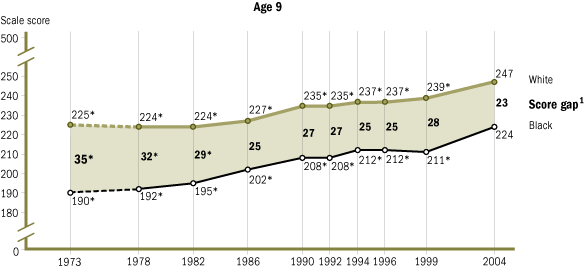

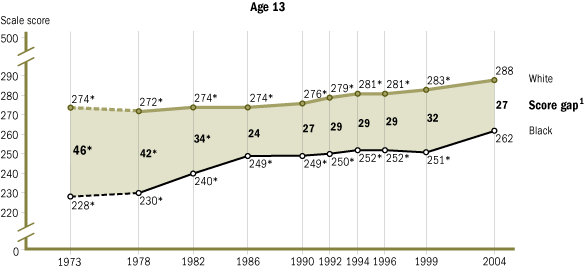

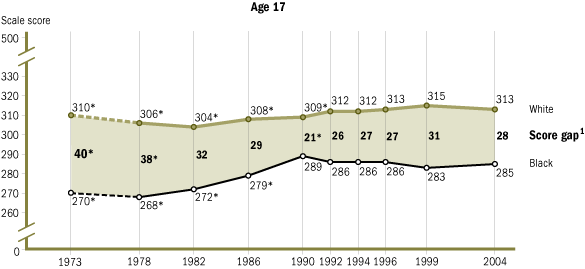

Non Hispanic White-Hispanic gap

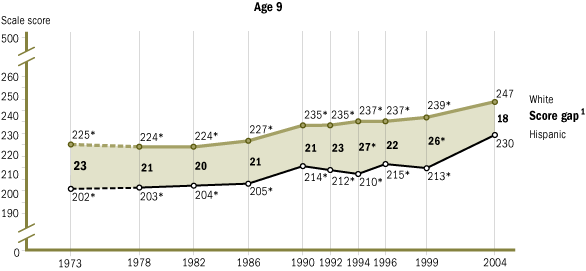

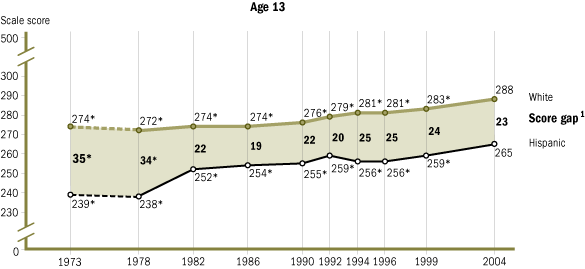

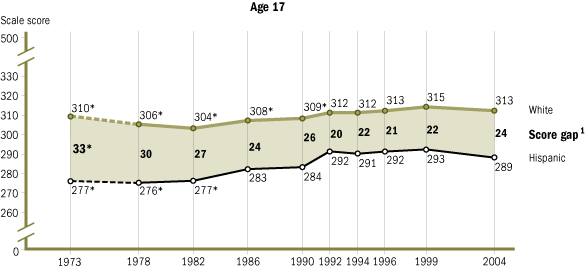

==== Reading ====
Results of the reading achievement test:

White-African American gap

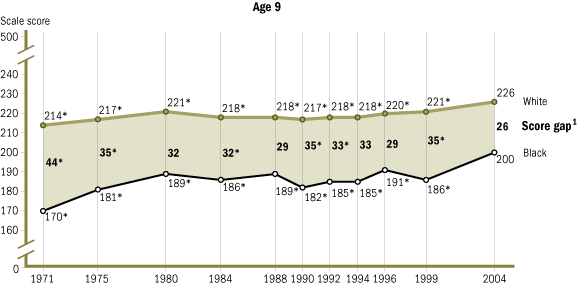

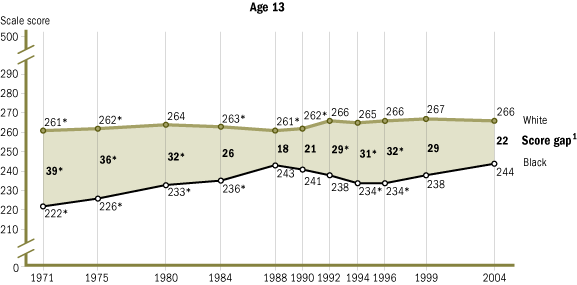

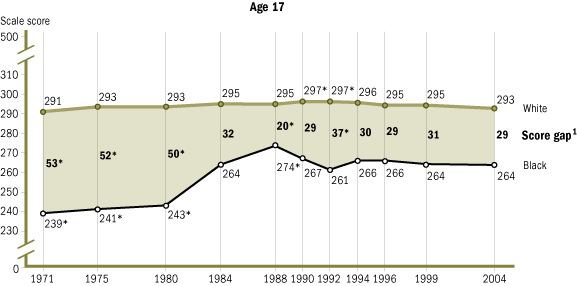

Non Hispanic White-Hispanic gap

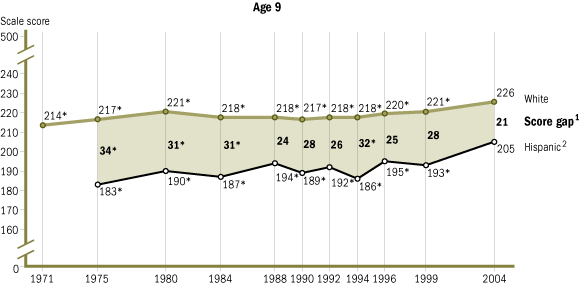

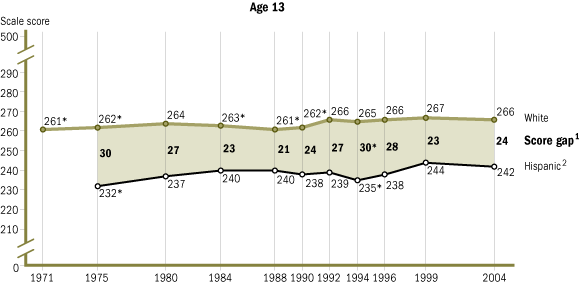

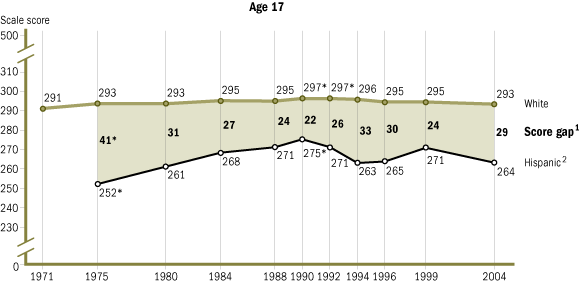

==== SAT scores ====
Racial and ethnic variations in SAT scores follow a similar pattern to other racial achievement gaps. In 1990, the average SAT was 528 for Asian-Americans, 491 for whites, 429 for Mexican Americans and 385 for blacks. 34% of Asians compared with 20% of whites, 3% of blacks, 7% of Mexican Americans, and 9% of Native Americans scored above a 600 on the SAT math section. On the SAT verbal section in 1990, whites scored an average of 442, compared with 410 for Asians, 352 for blacks, 380 for Mexican Americans, and 388 for Native Americans. In 2015, the average SAT scores on the math section were 598 for Asian-Americans, 534 for whites, 457 for Hispanic Latinos and 428 for blacks. Additionally, 10% of Asian-Americans, 8% of whites, 3% of Mexican Americans, 3% of Native Americans and 2% of blacks scored above 600 on the SAT verbal section in 1990. Race gaps on the SATs are especially pronounced at the tails of the distribution. In a perfectly equal distribution, the racial breakdown of scores at every point in the distribution should ideally mirror the demographic composition of test-takers as whole i.e. 51% whites, 21% Hispanic Latinos, 14% blacks, and 14% Asian-Americans. But ironically, among the highest top scorers, those scoring between a 750 and 800 (perfect scores) over 60% are East Asians of Taiwanese, Japanese, Korean and Han Chinese descent, while only 33% are white, compared to 5% Hispanic Latinos and 2% blacks.

There are some limitations to the data which may mean that, if anything, the race gap is being understated. The ceiling on the SAT score may, for example, understate the achievement and full potential of East Asians of Taiwanese, Japanese, Korean and Han Chinese descent. If the exam was redesigned to increase score variance (add harder and easier questions than it currently has), the achievement gap across racial groups could be even more wider and pronounced. In other words, if the math section was scored between 0 and 1000, we might see more complete tails on both the right and the left. More East Asians score between 750 and 800 than score between 700 and 750, suggesting that many East Asians of Taiwanese, Japanese, Korean and Han Chinese descent could be scoring high above 800 if the test allowed them to.

==== State standards tests ====
Most state tests showing African American failure rates anywhere from two to four times the rate of whites, such as Washington State's WASL test, and only half to one-quarter as likely to achieve a high score, even though these tests were designed to eliminate the negative effects of bias associated with standardized multiple choice tests. It is a top goal of education reform to eliminate the Education gap between all races, though skeptics question whether legislation such as No Child Left Behind truly closes the gap just by raising expectations. Others, such as Alfie Kohn, observe it may merely penalize those who do not score as well as the most educated ethnic and income groups.

Scored Level 3 on WASL Washington Assessment of Student Learning, Mathematics Grade 4 (1997) Data: Office Washington State Superintendent of Instruction

White	Black	Hispanic	Asian	Native American
17.1%	4.0%	4.3%	15.6%	1.6%

=== Education attainment ===
==== High school ====
In 2017, 93% of all 18- through 24-year-olds not enrolled in elementary or secondary school had completed high school. The gap between black and white completion rates narrowed since the 1970s, with completion rates for white students increasing from 86% in 1972 to 95% in 2017, and completion rates for black students rising from 72% in 1972 to 94% in 2017.

High school completion rates by race, 2017
Asian/Pacific Islander	98.6%
White	94.8%
Black	93.8%
Hispanic	88.3%

High school dropout rates by race, 2017
Asian	2.1%
White	4.3%
Black	6.5%
Hispanic	8.2%

==== Post-secondary education ====
As of 2008, 13 percent of Hispanics adults have earned a bachelor's degree or higher, compared with 15 percent of American Indian/Alaska Native adults, 20 percent of blacks, 33 percent of whites, and 52 percent of Asian Americans. Asians obtain more first professional degrees than any other race. The table below shows the number of degrees awarded for each group.

Post-secondary degree attainment by race, 2008

Race	Associate degree	Bachelor's degree	Master's degree	First professional degree	Cumulative %
Asians	6.9%	31.6%	14.0%	6.4%	58.9%
Whites	9.3%	21.1%	8.4%	3.1%	41.9%
Blacks	8.9%	13.6%	4.9%	1.3%	28.7%
American Indians/Alaska Natives	8.4%	9.8%	3.6%	1.4%	23.2%
Hispanics	6.1%	9.4%	2.9%	1.0%	19.4%

(Issued August 2003) Educational attainment by race and gender: 2000[26]
Census 2000 Brief
Percent of Adults 25 and over in group
Ranked by advanced degree                   HS   SC   BA   AD
Asian alone . .. . . . . . . . . . . . . .  80.4 64.6 44.1 17.4
White alone, not Hispanic or Latino.. . . . 85.5 55.4 27.0  9.8
White alone... . . . . . . . . . . . . . .  83.6 54.1 26.1  9.5
Two or more races. . . . . . . . . . . .    73.3 48.1 19.6  7.0
Black or African American alone . . . . .   72.3 42.5 14.3  4.8
Native Hawaiian and Other Pacific Islander  78.3 44.6 13.8  4.1
American Indian and Alaska Native alone . . 70.9 41.7 11.5  3.9
Hispanic or Latino (of any race).. . . . .  52.4 30.3 10.4  3.8
Some other race alone . . . . . . . . . . . 46.8 25.0  7.3  2.3
HS = high school completed SC = some college
BA = bachelor's degree AD = advanced degree

In 2018, the overall college enrollment rate of recent high school graduates for all races was 68%; Asian Americans had the highest enrollment rate (78%), followed by Whites (70%), Hispanics (63%), and Blacks (62%). Asian students also had the highest 6-year college graduation rate (74%), followed by Whites (64%), Hispanics (54%), and Blacks (40%). Even at prestigious institutions, the graduation rate of white students is higher than that of black students.

The college enrollment rate increased for each racial and ethnic group between 1980 and 2007, but the enrollment rates for Blacks and Hispanics did not increase at the same rate as among White students. Between 1980 and 2007, the college enrollment rate for Blacks increased from 44% to 56% and the college enrollment rates for Hispanics increased from 50% to 62%. In comparison, the same rate increased from 49.8% to 77.7% for Whites. There are no data for Asians or American Indians/Alaska Natives regarding enrollment rates from the 1980s to 2007.

=== Illiteracy ===
African Americans were once denied education. Even as late as 1947, about one third of African Americans over 65 were considered to lack the literacy to read and write their own names. By 1969, however, illiteracy among African Americans was less than one percent, though African Americans still lag in more stringent definitions of document literacy. Inability to read, write or speak English in America today is largely an issue for immigrants, mostly from Asia and Latin America.

Illiteracy rates by race: 1870 to 1979
Year	White	Black
1870	11.5%	79.9%
1880	9.4%	70.0%
1890	7.7%	56.8%
1900	6.2%	44.5%
1910	5.0%	30.5%
1920	4.0%	23.0%
1930	3.0%	16.4%
1940	2.0%	11.5%
1947	1.8%	11.0%
1952	1.8%	10.2%
1959	1.6%	7.5%
1969	0.7%	3.6%
1979	0.4%	1.6%

=== Long-term trends ===
The National Assessment of Educational Progress (NAEP) has been testing seventeen-year-olds since 1971. From 1971 to 1996, the black-white reading gap shrank by almost one half and the math gap by almost one third. Specifically, blacks scored an average of 239 points, and whites scored an average of 291 points on the NAEP reading tests in 1971. In 1990, blacks scored an average of 267, and whites scored an average of 297 points. On NAEP math tests in 1973, blacks scored an average of 270, and whites scored 310. In 1990, black average score was 289 and whites scored an average of 310 points. For Hispanics, the average NAEP math score for seventeen-year-olds in 1973 was 277 and 310 for whites. In 1990, the average score among Hispanics was 284 compared with 310 for whites.

Because of small population size in the 1970s, similar trend data are not available for Asian Americans. Data from the 1990 NAEP Mathematics Assessment Tests show that among twelfth graders, Asians scored an average of 315 points compared with 301 points for whites, 270 for blacks, 278 for Hispanics, and 290 for Native Americans. Racial and ethnic differentiation is most apparent at the highest achievement levels. Specifically, 13% of Asians performed at level of 350 points or higher, 6% of whites, less than 1% of blacks, and 1% of Hispanics did so.

The NAEP has since collected and analyzed data through 2008. Overall, the White-Hispanic and the White-Black gap for NAEP scores have significantly decreased since the 1970s. The Black-White Gap demonstrates:

- In mathematics, the gap for 17-year-olds was narrowed by 14 points from 1973 to 2008.
- In reading, the gap for 17-year-olds was narrowed by 24 points from 1971 to 2008.

The Hispanic-White Gap demonstrates:

- In mathematics, the gap for 17-year-olds was narrowed by 12 points from 1973 to 2008.
- In reading, the gap for 17-year-olds was narrowed by 15 points from 1975 to 2008.

Furthermore, subgroups showed predominant gains in 4th grade at all achievement levels. In terms of achieving proficiency, gaps between subgroups in most states have narrowed across grade levels, yet had widened in 23% of instances. The progress made in elementary and middle schools was greater than that in high schools, which demonstrates the importance of early childhood education. Greater gains were seen in lower-performing subgroups rather than in higher-performing subgroups. Similarly, greater gains were seen in Latino and African American subgroups than for low-income and Native American subgroups.

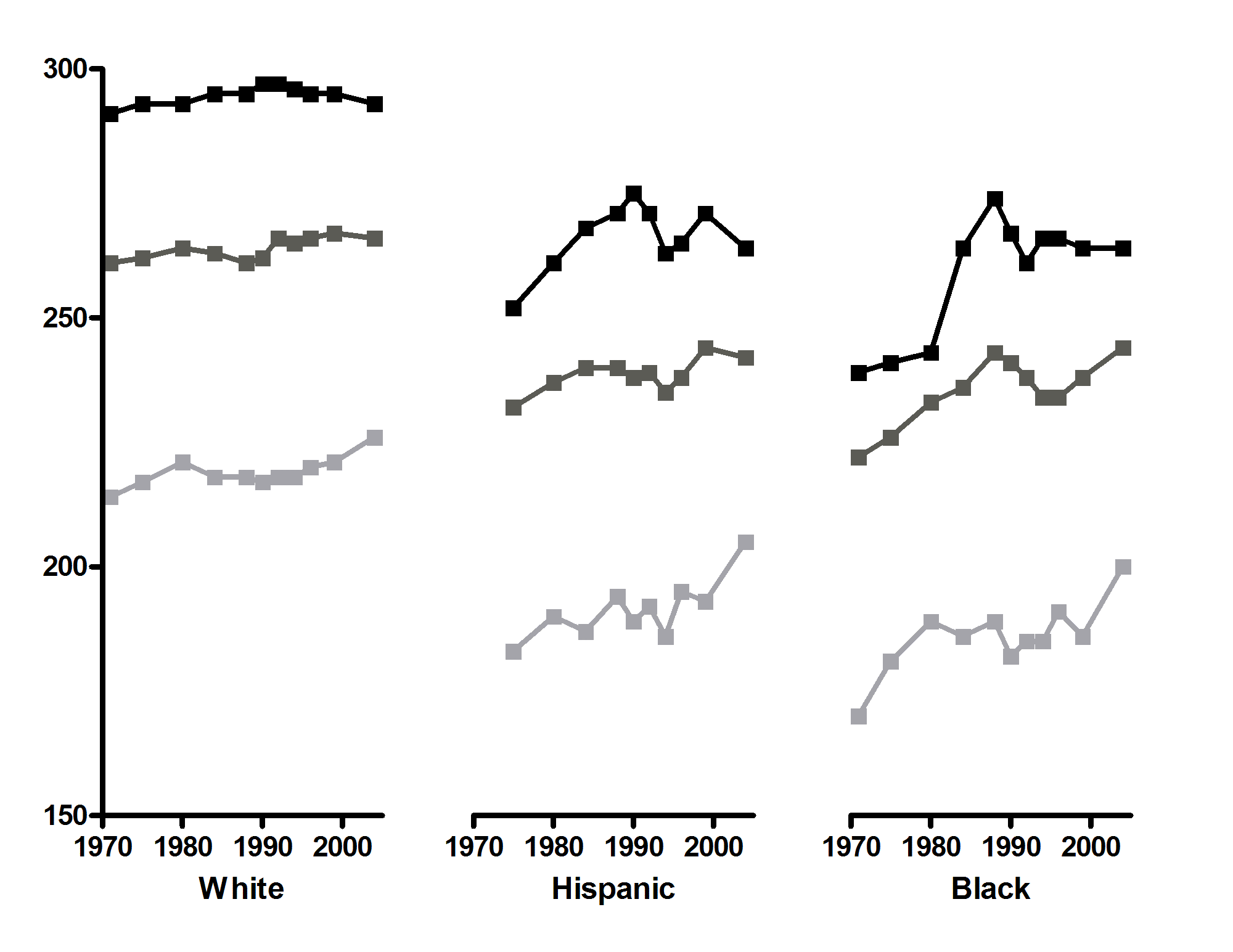

Reading- ages 9 (light gray), 13 (dark gray), and 17 (black).

=== International comparisons ===
International educational math scores (2007) (4th graders average score, TIMSS; International Math and Science Study, 2007)
American students: (by origin)	Maths
American students: (by origin)	Score
Asian American	582
European American	550
Hispanic American	504
African American	482
Highlights From TIMSS 2007

As a whole, students in the United States lagged the leading Asian and European nations in the TIMSS international math and science test. However, broken down by race, US Asians scored comparably to Asian nations, and white Americans scored comparably to leading European nations. Although some races generally score lower than whites in the US, they scored as well as whites in European nations: Hispanic Americans averaged 505, comparable to students in Austria and Sweden, while African Americans, at 482, were comparable to students in Norway and Ukraine.

== Possible causes ==
The achievement gap between low-income minority students and middle-income white students has been a popular research topic among sociologists since the publication of the report, "Equality of Educational Opportunity" (more widely known as the Coleman Report). This report was commissioned by the U.S. Department of Education in 1966 to investigate whether the performance of African-American students was caused by their attending schools of a lesser quality than white students. The report suggested that both in-school factors and home/community factors affect the academic achievement of students and contribute to the achievement gap that exists between races.

The study of the achievement gap can be addressed from two standpoints—from a supply-side and a demand-side viewpoint of education. In Poor Economics, Banerjee and Duflo explain the two families of arguments surrounding education of underserved populations. Demand-side arguments focus on aspects of minority populations that influence education achievement. These include family background and culture, which shape perceptions and expectations surrounding education. A large body of research has been dedicated to studying these factors contributing to the achievement gap. Supply-side arguments focus on the provision of education and resources and the systemic structures in place that perpetuate the achievement gap. These include neighborhoods, funding, and policy. In 2006, Ladson-Billings called on education researchers to move the spotlight of education research away from family background to take into account the rest of the factors that affect educational achievement, as explained by the Coleman Report. The concept of opportunity gaps—rather than achievement gaps—has changed the paradigm of education research to assess education from a top-down approach.

=== Social belonging ===
A person's sense of social belonging is one non-cognitive factor that plays a part in the racial achievement gap. Some of the processes that threaten a person's sense of belonging in schools include social stigma, negative intellectual stereotypes, and numeric under-representation.

Walton and Cohen describe three ways in which a sense of social belonging boosts motivation, the first being positive self-image. By adopting similar interests as those who a person considers to be socially significant, it may help to increase or affirm a person's sense of his or her personal worth. People have a basic need to belong, which is why people may feel a sense of distress when social rejection occurs. Students in minority groups have to battle other factors as well, such as peer and friend groups being separated by race. Homogeneous friend groups can segregate people out of important networking connections, thus limiting important future opportunities that non-minority groups have because they have access to these networking connections. Oakland students that come from low socioeconomic families are less likely to attend schools that provide equal education as wealthier schools that come from major American cities. This means that only two of ten students will go to schools that have a closing achievement gap.

Students who do not fall into the majority or dominant group in their schools often worry about whether or not they will belong and find a valued place in their school. Their thoughts are often centered around whether they will be accepted and valued for who they are around their peers. Social rejection can cause reductions in IQ test performance, self-regulation, and also can prompt aggression. People can do more together than they can alone. Social life is a form of collaborative activity, and an important feature of human life. When goals and objectives become shared, they offer a person and the social units he or she is a part of major advantages over if he or she was working alone.

Under performing groups in schools often report that they feel like they do not belong and that they are unhappy a majority of the time. Steele offers an example, explaining an observation done by his colleague, Treisman. It was observed that African American students at Berkeley did their work independently in their rooms with nobody to converse with. They spent most of their time checking answers to their arithmetic in the back of their textbook, weakening their grasp of the concepts themselves. This ultimately caused these students to do worse on tests and assessments than their white peers, creating a frustrating experience and also contributing to the racial achievement gap.

Another explanation that has been suggested for racial and ethnic differences in standardized test performance is that some minority children may not be motivated to do their best on these assessments. Many argue that standardized IQ tests and other testing procedures are culturally biased toward the knowledge and experiences of the European-American middle class.

=== Purpose ===
When students feel that what they are doing has purpose, they are more likely to succeed academically. Students who identify and actively work towards their individual, purposeful, life goals have a better chance at eliminating disengagement that commonly occurs in middle school and continues into later adolescence. These life goals give students a chance to believe that their school work is done in hopes of achieving larger, more long-term goals that matter to the world. This also gives students the opportunity to feel that their lives have meaning by working towards these goals.

Purposeful life goals, such as work goals, may also increase students motivation to learn. Adolescents may make connections between what they are learning in school and how they will use those skills and knowledge will help them make an impact in the future. This idea ultimately will lead students to create their own goals related to mastering the material they are learning in school.

Adolescents who have goals and believe that their opinions and voices can impact the world positively may become more motivated. They become more committed to mastering concepts and being accountable for their own learning, rather than focusing on getting the highest grade in the class. Students will study more intently and deeply, as well as persist longer, seeking out more challenges. They will like learning more because the tasks they are doing have purpose, creating a personal meaning to them and in turn leading to satisfaction.

=== Mindset ===
Carol Dweck, professor of psychology at Stanford University, suggests that students' mindsets (how they perceive their own abilities) play a large role in educational achievement and motivation. An adolescent's level of self-efficacy is a great predictor of their level of academic performance, going above and beyond a student's measured level of ability and also their prior performance in school. Students having a growth mindset believe that their intelligence can be developed over time. Those with a fixed mindset believe that their intelligence is fixed and cannot grow and develop. Students with growth mindsets tend to outperform their peers who have fixed mindsets.

Dweck points out that teachers have a high degree of influence on which kind of mindset a student develops in school. When people are taught with a growth mindset, the ideas of challenging themselves and putting in more effort follow. People believe that each mindset is better than the other, which causes students to feel that they are not as good as other students in school. A big question that is asked in schooling is when does someone feel smart: when they are flawless or when they are learning? With a fixed mindset, you must be flawless, and not just smart in the classroom. With this mindset, there is even more pressure on students to not only succeed, but to be flawless in front of their peers.

Students who have a fixed mindset, have come to change the idea of failure as an action to an identity. They come to think of the idea of failing something as being that they are a failure and that they cannot achieve something. This links back into how they think of themselves as a person and decreases their motivation in school. This sense of "failure" is especially prominent during adolescence. If one thing goes wrong, one with a fixed mindset will feel that they cannot overcome this small failure, and thus their mindset motivation will decrease.

=== Structural and institutional factors ===
Different schools have different effects on similar students. Children of color tend to be concentrated in low-achieving, highly segregated schools. In general, minority students are more likely to come from low-income households, meaning minority students are more likely to attend poorly funded schools based on the districting patterns within the school system. Schools in lower-income districts tend to employ less qualified teachers and have fewer educational resources. Research shows that teacher effectiveness is the most important in-school factor affecting student learning. Good teachers can actually close or eliminate the gaps in achievement on the standardized tests that separate white and minority students.

Schools also tend to place students in tracking groups as a means of tailoring lesson plans for different types of learners. However, as a result of schools placing emphasis on socioeconomic status and cultural capital, minority students are vastly over-represented in lower educational tracks. Similarly, Hispanic and African American students are often wrongly placed into lower tracks based on teachers' and administrators' expectations for minority students. Such expectations of a race within school systems are a form of institutional racism. Some researchers compare the tracking system to a modern form of racial segregation within the schools.

Studies on tracking groups within schools have also proven to be detrimental for minority students. Once students are in these lower tracks, they tend to have less-qualified teachers, a less challenging curriculum, and few opportunities to advance into higher tracks. There is also some research that suggests students in lower tracks suffer from social psychological consequences of being labeled as a slower learner, which often leads children to stop trying in school. In fact, many sociologists argue that tracking in schools does not provide any lasting benefits to any group of students.

The practice of awarding low grades and test scores to children who struggle causes low-performing children to experience anxiety, demoralization, and a loss of control. This undermines performance, and may explain why the achievement gap increases over the school years, and why the interventions implemented thus far seem to have failed to close it.

=== School funding and geography ===
The quality of school that a student attends and the socioeconomic status of the student's residential neighborhood are two factors that can affect a student's academic performance.

In the United States, only 8% of public education funding comes from the federal government. The other 92% comes from local, state, and private sources. Local funding is considered unequal as it is based on property taxes. So those who are in areas in which there is lower property value have less funded schools, making schools unequal within a district. This system means that schools located in areas with lower real estate values have proportionately less money to spend per pupil than schools located in areas with higher real estate values. This system has also maintained a "funding segregation": because minority students are much more likely to live in a neighborhood with lower property values, they are much more likely to attend a school that receives significantly lower funding.

Data from research shows that when the quality of the school is better and students are given more resources, it reduces the racial achievement gap. When white and black schools were given the equal amount of resources, it shows that black students started improving while white students stayed the same because they didn't need the resources. This showed that lack of resources is a factor in the racial achievement gap. The research that was conducted shows that predominantly white schools have more resources than black schools. However, lack of resources is only a small effect on academic achievement in comparison to students' family backgrounds.

Using property taxes to fund public schools contributes to school inequality. Lower-funded schools are more likely to have lower-paid teachers; higher student-teacher ratios, meaning less individual attention for each student; older books; fewer extracurricular activities, which have been shown to increase academic achievement; poorly maintained school facilities; and less access to services like school nursing and social workers. All of these factors can affect student performance and perpetuate inequalities between students of different races.

Living in a high-poverty or disadvantaged neighborhood have been shown to negatively influence educational aspirations and consequently attainment. The Moving to Opportunity experiment showed that moving to a low-poverty neighborhood had a positive effect on the educational attainment of minority adolescents. The school characteristics associated with the low-poverty neighborhoods proved to be effective mediators, since low-poverty neighborhoods tended to have more favorable school composition, safety, and quality. Additionally, living in a neighborhood with economic and social inequalities leads to negative attitudes and more problematic behavior due to and social tensions. Greater college aspirations have been correlated with more social cohesiveness among neighborhood youth, since community support from both youth and adults in the neighborhood tends to have a positive influence on educational aspirations. Some researchers believe that vouchers should be given to low income students so they can go to school in other places. However, other researchers believe that the idea of vouchers promotes equality and doesn't eliminate it.

Racial and ethnic residential segregation in the United States still persists, with African Americans experiencing the highest degree of residential segregation, followed by Latino Americans and Asian Americans and Pacific Islanders. This isolation from white American communities is highly correlated with low property values and high-poverty neighborhoods. This issue is propagated by issues of home ownership facing minorities, especially African Americans and Latino Americans, since residential areas predominantly populated by these minority groups are perceived as less attractive in the housing market. Home ownership by minority groups is further undermined by institutionalized discriminatory practices, such as differential treatment of African Americans and Latino Americans in the housing market compared with white Americans. Higher mortgages charged to African American or Latino American buyers make it more difficult for members of these minority groups to attain full home ownership and accumulate wealth. As a result, African American and Latino American groups continue to live in racially segregated neighborhoods and face the socioeconomic consequences of residential segregation.

Differences in the academic performance of African-American and white students exist even in schools that are desegregated and diverse, and studies have shown that a school's racial mix does not seem to have much effect on changes in reading scores after sixth grade, or on math scores at any age. In fact, minority students in segregated-minority schools have more optimism and greater educational aspirations as well as achievements than minority students in segregated-white schools. This can be attributed to various factors, including the attitudes of faculty and staff at segregated-white schools and the effect of stereotype threat.

=== Education debt ===
Education debt is a theory developed by Gloria Ladson-Billings, a pedagogical theorist, to attempt to explain the racial achievement gap. As defined by a colleague of Ladson-Billings, professor emeritus Robert Haveman, education debt is the "foregone schooling resources that we could have (should have) been investing in (primarily) low income kids, which deficit leads to a variety of social problems (e.g. crime, low productivity, low wages, low labor force participation) that require on-going public investment". The education debt theory has historical, economic, sociopolitical and moral components.

=== Parenting influence ===
Parenting methods are different across cultures, thus can have dramatic influence on educational outcomes. For instance, Asian parents often apply strict rules and parental authoritarianism to their children while many white American parents deem creativity and self-sufficiency to be more valuable. Battle Hymn of the Tiger Mother by Yale Professor Amy Chua highlights some of the very important aspects in East Asian parenting method in comparison to the "American way". Chua's book has generated interests and controversies in the "Tiger Mom" parenting method and its role in determining children's education outcomes. Many Hispanic parents and their children believe that a college degree is necessary for obtaining stable and meaningful work. This attitude is reflected in the educational expectations parents hold for their children and in the expectations that young people have for themselves (U.S. Department of Education, 1995b, p. 88). High educational expectations can be found among all racial and ethnic groups regardless of their economic and social resources (p. 73). Although parents and children share high educational aims, their aspirations do not necessarily translate into postsecondary matriculation. This is especially the case for Hispanic high school students, particularly those whose parents have not attended college.

Parental involvement in children's education is influential to children's success at school. Teachers often view low parental involvement as a barrier to student success. Collaboration between teachers and parents is necessary when working to help a child; parents have the necessary knowledge of what is best for their child's situation. However, the student body in schools is diverse, and although teachers make an effort to try and understand each child's unique cultural beliefs, it is important that they are meeting with parents to get a clear understanding of what needs should be met in order for the student to succeed. School administrators must accommodate and account for family differences and also be supportive by promoting ways families can get involved. For example, schools can provide support by accommodating the needs of the family who have do not have transportation, schools may do so by providing external resources that may benefit the family. As referenced by Feliciano et al. (2016), educators can also account for culture by providing education about the diversity at the school. This can be achieved by creating an environment where both teachers and students learn about cultures represented among the student population.

Larocquem et al. (2011) stated that family involvement may include visiting their children's class, being involved with a parent teacher organization, attending school activities, speaking to the child's class, and volunteering at school events. It is also important for families to be involved with the child's school assignments, especially by holding them accountable for completion and discussion of the work assigned. Also, educators may want to consider how parental language barriers and educational experiences affect families and the influence of contributing to their child's education. In addition, even when families want to get involved, they may not know how to collaborate with school personnel, especially for families who are Hispanic, African American, and or of low economic status. A study done by Nistler and Maiers (2000), found that although different barriers for families may inhibit participation, families reported that they would want to participate nonetheless. Larocque et al. (2011) suggest that teachers need to find out what values and expectations are held for the child, which should be done by involving parents in the decision-making process.

Children can differ in their readiness to learn before they enter school. Research has shown that parental involvement in a child's development has a significant effect on the educational achievement of minority children. According to sociologist Annette Lareau, differences in parenting styles can affect a child's future achievement. In her book Unequal Childhoods, she argues that there are two main types of parenting: concerted cultivation and the achievement of natural growth.

- Concerted cultivation is usually practiced by middle-class parents, regardless of their race. These parents are more likely to be involved in their children's education, encourage their children's participation in extracurricular activities or sports teams, and to teach their children how to successfully communicate with authority figures. These communication skills give children a form of social capital that help them communicate their needs and negotiate with adults throughout their life.
- The achievement of natural growth is generally practiced by poor and working-class families. These parents generally do not play as large a role in their children's education, their children are less likely to participate in extracurriculars or sports teams, and they usually do not teach their children the communication skills that middle- and upper-class children have. Instead, these parents are more concerned that their children obey authority figures and have respect for authority, which are two characteristics that are important to have in order to succeed in working-class jobs.

The parenting practices that a child is raised with influences their future educational achievement. However, parenting styles are heavily influenced by the parents' and family's social, economic, and physical circumstances. In particular, immigration status (if applicable), education level, incomes, and occupations influence the degree of parental involvement their children's academic achievement. These factors directly determine the access of the parents to time and resources to dedicate to their children's development. These factors also indirectly determine the home environment and parents' educational expectations of their children. For example, children from poor families have lower academic performance in kindergarten than children from middle to upper-class backgrounds, but children from poor families who had cognitively stimulating materials in the home demonstrated higher rates of academic achievement in kindergarten. Additionally, parents of children living in poverty are less likely to have cognitively stimulating materials in the home for their children and are less likely to be involved in their child's school. The quality of language that the student uses is affected by family's socioeconomic backgrounds, which is another factor in the academic achievement gap.

=== Preschool education ===
Additionally, poor and minority students have disproportionately less access to high-quality early childhood education, which has been shown to have a strong impact on early learning and development. One study found that although black children are more likely to attend preschool than white children, they may experience lower-quality care. The same study also found that Hispanic children in the U.S. are much less likely to attend preschool than white children. Another study conducted in Illinois in 2010 found that only one in three Latino parents could find a preschool slot for his or her child, compared to almost two thirds of other families.

Finally, according to the National Institute for Early Education Research (NIEER), families with modest incomes (less than $60,000) have the least access to preschool education. Research suggests that dramatic increases in both enrollment and quality of prekindergarten programs would help to alleviate the school readiness gap and ensure that low-income and minority children begin school on even footing with their peers.

=== Income ===
In the United States, socioeconomic status of families affects children schooling. Sociologist Laura Perry found what she calls 'Student Socioeconomic Status' has the third strongest influence on educational outcomes in the United States out of nations within this study and it ranked sixth in influence of equity differences among schools. These families are more susceptible to multidimensional poverty, meaning the three dimensions of poverty, health, education, and standard of living are interconnected to give an overall assessment of a nations poverty.

Some researchers, such as Katherine Paschall, argue that family income plays more of a factor in the academic achievement gap than race/ethnicity. However, other studies find that the racial gaps persists between families of different race and ethnicity that have similar incomes. When comparing white students from families with incomes below $10,000 they had a mean SAT test score that was 61 points higher than African American students whose families had incomes between $80,000 and $100,000. This means that there are more contributing factors than just economic status.

Conservative African American scholars such as Thomas Sowell observe that while SAT scores are lower for students with less parental education and income, Asian Americans who took the SAT with incomes below $10,000 score 482 in math in 1995, comparable to whites earning $30–40,000 and higher and blacks over $70,000. Similarly, a later study reveals that for the 2003 college bound cohort, Black test-takers with more than $100,000 in family income have mean SAT math and verbal scores of 490 and 495 respectively, and this is comparable with the scores of the White test-takers with $20,000–$25,000 in family income (493 and 495). Test scores in middle-income black communities, such as Charles County and Prince George's County, are still not comparable to those in non-black suburbs.

Economic factors were identified as lack of online course access (McCoy, 2012) and online course attrition which indicated before (Liu et al., 2007). Based on the National Center for Educational Statistic (2015), about half of African American male students grew up in single-parent households. They are associated with higher incidences of poverty, which leads to poorer educational outcomes (Child Trends Databank, 2015). Low-income households tend to have fewer home computers and less access to the Internet (Zickuhr & Smith, 2012).

=== Cultural differences ===
Some experts believe that cultural factors contribute to the racial achievement gap. Students from minority cultures face language barriers, differences in cultural norms in interactions, learning styles, varying levels of receptiveness of their culture to white American culture, and varying levels of acceptance of the white American culture by the students. In particular, it has been found that minority students from cultures with views that generally do not align with the mainstream cultural views have a harder time in school. Furthermore, views of the value of education differ by minority groups as well as members within each group. Both Hispanic and African-American youths often receive mixed messages about the importance of education, and often end up performing below their academic potential.

=== Online education ===
Achievement gaps between African American students and White students in online classes tend to be greater than regular class. Expanding from 14% in 1995 to 22% in 2015 (National Center for Education Statistics, 2016). Possible causes include differences in socio-economic status (Palmer et al., 2013), academic performance differences (Osborne, 2001), technology inaccessibility (Fairlie, 2012), lack of online technical support (Rovai & Gallien, 2005), and anxiety towards racial stereotyping (Osborne, 2001).

Nowadays, there is a growing population of students who use online education, and the number of institutions which offering fully online degrees is also increasing. According to several studies, online education probably could create an environment where there is less cultural division and negative stereotypes of African Americans, thus protecting those students who have had bad experiences. In addition, the influence technology and user skills and so as economics and academic influences are tightly bonded, that may have positively contributed to African American online learners experience. However, it appears African American male students are less likely to enroll in online classes.

=== Latino American cultural factors ===
Many Hispanic parents who immigrate to The United States see a high school diploma as being a sufficient amount of schooling and may not stress the importance of continuing on to college. Parental discouragement from pursuing higher education tends to be based on the notion of "we made it without formal schooling, so you can too". Additionally, depending on the immigration generation and economic status of the student, some students prioritize their obligations to assisting their family over their educational aspirations. Poor economic circumstances place greater pressure on the students to sacrifice time spent working towards educational attainment in order to dedicate more time to help support the family. Surveys have shown that while Latino American families would like their children to have a formal education, they also place high value on getting jobs, marrying, and having children as early as possible, all of which conflict with the goal of educational achievement. However, counselors and teachers usually promote continuing on to college. This message conflicts with the one being sent to Hispanic students by their families and can negatively affect the motivation of Hispanic students, as evidenced by the fact that Latinos have the lowest college attendance rates of any racial/ethnic group. Overall, Latino American students face barriers such as financial stability and insufficient support for higher education within their families. Reading to children when they are younger increases literacy comprehension, which is a fundamental concept in the education system; however, it is less likely to occur within Latino American families because many parents do not have any formal education. Currently, Latino Americans over the age of 25 have the lowest percentage in obtaining a bachelor's degree or higher amongst all other racial groups; while only having 11 percent.

Disadvantages in a child's early life can cultivate into achievement gaps in their education. Poverty, coupled with the environment they are raised in, can lead to shortcomings in educational achievement. Despite strong standards and beliefs in education, Hispanic children consistently perform poorly, reflected by a low average of math and reading scores, as compared to other groups except African American. Hispanic and African American children have been shown to be more likely to be raised in poverty, with 33% of Hispanic families living below the economic poverty level, compared to African American (39%), Asian (14%) and White (13%) counterparts. Children who are raised in poverty are less likely to be enrolled in nursery or preschool. Though researchers are seeing improvements in achievement levels, such as a decrease in high school dropout rates (from 24% to 17%) and a steady increase in math and reading scores over the past 10 years, there are still issues that must be addressed.

There is a common misconception that Hispanic parents are not involved in their child's education and fail to transmit strong educational values to their children. However, there is evidence that Hispanic parents actually hold their children's education in high value. The majority of Hispanic children are affected by immigration. It affects recent immigrants as well as the children of immigrants. Both recent immigrants and the children of immigrants are faced with language barriers and other migration obstacles. A study explored the unique situation and stressors recent Latin American immigrants face. Hispanic students showed lower academic achievement, more absences, and more life stressors than their counterparts. In 2014–2015, 77.8% of Hispanic children were English Language learners. This can be problematic because children may not have parents who speak English at home to help with language acquisition. Immigration struggles can be used as a motivator for students. Immigrant parents appeal to their children and hold high expectations because of the "gift" they are bestowing on them. They immigrated and sacrificed their lives so their children can succeed, and this framework is salient in encouraging children to pursue their education. Parents use their struggles and occupation to encourage a better life.

Parental involvement has been shown to increase educational success and attainment for students. For example, parental involvement in elementary school has been shown to lower high school dropout rates and improved on time completion of high school. A common misconception is that Latino parents don't hold their children's education in high regards (Valencia, 2002), but this has been debunked. Parents show their values in education by holding high academic expectations and giving "consejos" or advice. In 2012, 97% of families reported teaching their children letters, words or numbers. A study reported that parent involvement during adolescence continues to be as influential as in early childhood.

=== African American cultural factors ===
The culture and environment in which children are raised may play a role in the achievement gap. Jencks and Phillips argue that African American parents may not encourage early education in toddlers because they do not see the personal benefits of having exceptional academic skills. As a result of cultural differences, African American students tend to begin school with smaller vocabularies than their white classmates. Hart and Risley calculated a "30 million word gap" between children of high school dropouts and those of professionals who are college educated. The differences are qualitative as well as quantitative, with differences in "unique" words, complexity, and "conversational turns."

However, poverty often acts as a confounding factor and differences that are assumed to arise from racial/cultural factors may be socioeconomically driven, as can be seen by a study where immigrant-origin Black undergraduates outperformed U.S.-origin Black undergraduates until socioeconomic status was taken into account. Many children who are poor, regardless of race, come from homes that lack stability, continuity of care, adequate nutrition, and medical care creating a level of environmental stress that can affect the young child's development. As a result, these children enter school with decreased word knowledge that can affect their language skills, influence their experience with books, and create different perceptions and expectations in the classroom context.

Studies show that when students have parental assistance with homework, they perform better in school. This is a problem for many minority students due to the large number of single-parent households (67% of African-American children are in a single-parent household) and the increase in non-English speaking parents. Students from single-parent homes often find it difficult to find time to receive help from their parent. Similarly, some Hispanic students have difficulty getting help with their homework because there is not an English speaker at home to offer assistance.

African American students are also likely to receive different messages about the importance of education from their peer group and from their parents. Many young African-Americans are told by their parents to concentrate on school and do well academically, which is similar to the message that many middle-class white students receive. However, the peers of African-American students are more likely to place less emphasis on education, sometimes accusing studious African-American students of "acting white". This causes problems for black students who want to pursue higher levels of education, forcing some to hide their study or homework habits from their peers and perform below their academic potential. As some researchers point out, minority students may feel little motivation to do well in school because they do not believe it will pay off in the form of a better job or upward social mobility. By not trying to do well in school, such students engage in a rejection of the achievement ideology – that is, the idea that working hard and studying long hours will pay off for students in the form of higher wages or upward social mobility.

=== Asian American cultural factors ===
Asian American students are more likely to view education as a means to social mobility and career advancement. It may also provide a means to overcome discrimination as well as language barriers. This notion comes from cultural expectations and parental expectations of their children, which are rooted in the cultural belief that education and hard work is the key to educational and eventually occupational attainment. Many Asian Americans immigrated to the United States voluntarily, in search for better opportunities. This immigration status comes into play when assessing the cultural views of Asian Americans since attitudes of more recent immigration are associated with optimistic views about the correlation between hard work and success. Obstacles such as language barriers and acceptance of white American culture are more easily overcome by voluntary immigrants since their expectations of attaining better opportunities in the United States influence their interactions and experiences. Students that identify as Asian American believe that having a good education would also help them speak out against racism based on the model-minority stereotype.

=== Factors specific to refugees ===
Part of the racial achievement gap can be attributed to the experience of the refugee population in the United States. Refugee groups in particular face obstacles such as cultural and language barriers and discrimination, in addition to migration-related stresses. These factors affect how successfully refugee children can assimilate to and succeed in the United States. Furthermore, it has been shown that immigrant children from politically unstable countries do not perform as well as immigrant children from politically stable countries.

=== Genetic factors ===
Scientific consensus tells us that there is no genetic component behind differences in academic achievement between racial groups. However, pseudoscientific claims that certain racial groups are intellectually superior and others inferior continue to circulate. A recent example is Herrnstein and Murray's 1994 book The Bell Curve, which controversially claimed that variation in average levels of intelligence (IQ) between racial groups are genetic in origin, and that this may explain some portion of the racial disparities in achievement. The book has been described by many academics as a restatement of previously debunked "scientific racism", and was condemned by both literary reviewers and academics within related fields. The consensus view among scientists is that there is no difference in inherent cognitive ability between different races, and that environment is at the root of the achievement gap.

== Implications ==
Sociologists Christopher Jencks and Meredith Phillips have argued that narrowing the black-white test score gap "would do more to move [the United States] toward racial equality than any politically plausible alternative". There is also strong evidence that narrowing the gap would have a significant positive economic and social impact.

=== Economic outcomes ===
The racial achievement gap has consequences on the life outcomes of minority students. However, this gap also has the potential for negative implications for American society as a whole, especially in terms of workforce quality and the competitiveness of the American economy. As the economy has become more globalized and the United States' economy has shifted away from manufacturing and towards a knowledge-based economy, education has become an increasingly important determinant of economic success and prosperity. A strong education is now essential for preparing and training the future workforce that is able to compete in the global economy. Education is also important for attaining jobs and a stable career, which is critical for breaking the cycle of poverty and securing a sound economic future, both individually and as a nation. Students with lower achievement are more likely to drop out of high school, entering the workforce with minimal training and skills, and subsequently earning substantially less than those with more education. Therefore, eliminating the racial achievement gap and improving the achievement of minority students will help eliminate economic disparities and ensure that America's future workforce is well prepared to be productive and competitive citizens.

Reducing the racial achievement gap is especially important because the United States is becoming an increasingly diverse country. The percentage of African-American and Hispanic students in school is increasing: in 1970, African-Americans and Hispanics made up 15% of the school-age population, and that number had increased to 30% by 2000. It is expected that minority students will represent the majority of school enrollments by 2015. Minorities make up a growing share of America's future workforce; therefore, the United States' economic competitiveness depends heavily on closing the racial achievement gap.

The racial achievement gap affects the volume and quality of human capital, which is also reflected through calculations of GDP. The cost of racial achievement gap accounts for 2–4 percent of the 2008 GDP. This percentage is likely to increase as blacks and Hispanics continue to account for a higher proportion of the population and workforce. Furthermore, it was estimated that $310 billion would be added to the US economy by 2020 if minority students graduated at the same rate as white students. Even more substantial is the narrowing of educational achievement levels in the US compared to those of higher-achieving nations, such as Finland and Korea. McKinsey & Company estimate a $1.3 trillion to $2.3 trillion, or a 9 to 16 percent difference in GDP. Furthermore, if high school dropouts were to cut in half, over $45 billion would be added in savings and additional revenue. In a single high school class, halving the dropout rate would be able to support over 54,000 new jobs, and increase GDP by as much as $9.6 billion. Overall, the cost of high school drop outs on the US economy is roughly $355 billion.

$3.7 billion would be saved on community college remediation costs and lost earnings if all high school students were ready for college. Furthermore, if high school graduation rates for males raised by 5 percent, cutting back on crime spending and increasing earnings each year would lead to an $8 billion increase the US economy.

A 2009 report by the management consulting firm McKinsey & Company asserts that the persistence of the achievement gap in the U.S. has the economic effect of a "permanent national recession." The report claims that if the achievement gap between black and Latino performance and white student performance had been narrowed, GDP in 2008 would have been $310 billion to $525 billion higher (2–4 percent).

If the gap between low-income students and their peers had been narrowed, GDP in the same year would have been $400 billion to $670 billion higher (3–5 percent). In addition to the potential increase in GDP, the report projects that closing the achievement gap would lead to cost savings in areas outside of education, such as incarceration and healthcare. The link between low school performance and crime, low earnings and poor health has been echoed in academic research.

=== Job opportunities ===
As the United States' economy has moved towards a globalized knowledge-based economy, education has become even more important for attaining jobs and a stable career, which is critical for breaking the cycle of poverty and securing a sound economic future. The racial achievement gap can hinder job attainment and social mobility for minority students. The United States Census Bureau reported $62,545 as the median income of white families, $38,409 of Black families, and $39,730 for Hispanic families. And while the median income of Asian families is $75,027, the number of people working in these households is usually greater than that in white American families. The difference in income levels relate highly to educational opportunities between various groups. Students who drop out of high school as a result of the racial achievement gap demonstrate difficulty in the job market. The median income of young adults who do not finish high school is about $21,000, compared to the $30,000 of those who have at least earned a high school credential. This translates into a difference of $630,000 in the course of a lifetime. Students who are not accepted or decide not to attend college as a result of the racial achievement gap may forgo over $450,000 in lifetime earnings had they earned a Bachelor of Arts degree. In 2009, $36,000 was the median income for those with an associate degree; $45,000 was the median income for those with a bachelor's degree; and $60,000 was the median income for those with a master's degree or higher.

=== Stereotype threat ===
Beyond differences in earnings, minority students also experience stereotype threats that negatively affects performance through activation of salient racial stereotypes. The stereotype threat both perpetuates and is caused by the achievement gap. Furthermore, students of low academic performance demonstrate low expectations for themselves and self-handicapping tendencies. Psychologists Claude Steele, Joshua Aronson, and Steven Spencer, have found that microaggressions such as passing reminders that someone belongs to one group or another (i.e., a group stereotyped as inferior in academics) can affect test performance.

Steele, Aronson and Spencer, have examined and performed experiments to see how stereotypes can threaten how students evaluate themselves, which then alters academic identity and intellectual performance. Steele tested the stereotype threat theory by giving Black and white college students a half-hour test using difficult questions from the verbal Graduate Record Examination (GRE). In the stereotype-threat condition, they told students the test diagnosed intellectual ability. In saying that the test diagnoses intellectual ability it can potentially elicit the stereotype that Blacks are less intelligent than whites. In the no-stereotype-threat condition, they told students that the test was a problem-solving lab task that said nothing about ability. This made stereotypes irrelevant. In the stereotype threat condition, Blacks who were evenly matched with whites in their group by SAT scores, performed worse compared to their white counterparts. In the experiments with no stereotype threat, Blacks performed slightly better than in those with a stereotype threat, though still significantly worse than whites. Aronson believes the study of stereotype threat offers some "exciting and encouraging answers to these old questions [of achievement gaps] by looking at the psychology of stigma – the way human beings respond to negative stereotypes about their racial or gender group".

Claude M. Steele suggested that minority children and adolescents may also experience stereotype threat—the fear that they will be judged to have traits associated with negative appraisals and/or stereotypes of their race or ethnic group. According to this theory, this produces test anxiety and keeps them from doing as well as they could on tests. According to Steele, minority test takers experience anxiety, believing that if they do poorly on their test they will confirm the stereotypes about inferior intellectual performance of their minority group. As a result, a self-fulfilling prophecy begins, and the child performs at a level beneath his or her inherent abilities.

=== Political representation ===
Another consequence of the racial achievement gap can be seen in the lack of representation of minority groups in public office. Studies have shown that higher socioeconomic status—in terms of income, occupation, and/or educational attainment—is correlated with higher participation in politics. This participation is defined as "individual or collective action at the national or local level that supports or opposes state structures, authorities, and/or decisions regarding allocation of public goods"; this action ranges from engaging in activities such as voting in elections to running for public office.

Since median income per capita for minority groups (except Asians) is lower than that of white Americans, and since minority groups (except Asians) are more likely to occupy less gainful employment and achieve lower education levels, there is a lowered likelihood of political participation among minority groups. Education attainment is highly correlated with earnings and occupation. And there is a proven disparity between educational attainment of white Americans and minority groups, with only 30% of bachelor's degrees awarded in 2009 to minority groups. Thus socioeconomic status—and therefore political participation—is correlated with race. Research has shown that African Americans, Latino Americans, and Asian Americans are less politically active, by varying degrees, than white Americans.

A consequence of underrepresentation of minority groups in leadership is incongruence between policy and community needs. A study conducted by Kenneth J. Meier and Robert E. England of 82 of the largest urban school districts in the United States showed that African American membership on the school board of these districts led to more policies encouraging more African American inclusion in policy considerations. It has been shown that both passive and active representation of minority groups serves to align constituent policy preference and representation of these opinions, and thereby facilitate political empowerment of these groups.

=== Special programs ===
Achievement gaps among students may also manifest themselves in the racial and ethnic composition of special education and gifted education programs. Typically, African American and Hispanic students are enrolled in greater numbers in special education programs than their numbers would indicate in most populations, while these groups are underrepresented in gifted programs. Research shows that these disproportionate enrollment trends may be a consequence of the differences in educational achievement among groups.

== Efforts to narrow the achievement gap ==
The United States has seen a variety of different attempts to narrow the racial achievement gap. These attempts include focusing on the importance of early childhood education, using federal standards based reforms, and implementing institutional changes. The consequences of the achievement gap will still be felt for years. For instance, the Oakland achievement gap grew by 11 percent between 2011 and 2013. This rate is a quicker pace than 80 percent of other major nationwide cities. This means that Oakland's achievement gap is larger than half of California's cities. Attempts to narrow the achievement gap have been met with resistance. For example, in August 2020, the US Justice Department argued that Yale University discriminated against Asian candidates on the basis of their race, a charge the university denied.

Explanations for the achievement gap and concerns over its effects and even the existence of such a gap are contested. These explanations are also the source of much controversy, especially since efforts to "close the gap" have become some of the more politically prominent education reform issues. The issues that the achievement gap perpetuate also hold politically charged issues. For example, the cause of the Latino education crisis is not attributable to any single factor. It is likely the result of multiple variables—all of which can have an effect on one another—ranging from social, economic, and educational conditions to inadequate social services and families with exceptionally low human and social capital. The effects of the achievement gap in school can be seen later in life for students. For example, since schools often lack the resources to meet many students' most basic educational needs and since there are few entry-level jobs that provide a living wage and benefits available to those without higher education or special skills in the economy, many are left at a disadvantage. The following attempts have all been made in order to counteract the effects of the achievement gap at schools. They range from nationwide, government-led initiatives to smaller school-based initiatives.

=== Early childhood education ===
There are large cognitive and emotional gaps that form at early ages. They persist throughout childhood and strongly influence adult outcomes. The gaps originate before formal schooling begins and persists through childhood and into adulthood. Children who score poorly on tests of cognitive skills before starting kindergarten are highly likely to be low performers throughout their school careers. The evidence of the early appearance of the gap has led to efforts focused on early childhood interventions. Remediating the problems created by the gaps is not as cost effective as preventing them at the outset. Eight psychologists performed an experiment of infant children born in Quebec in 1997/1998 and followed annually until 7 years of age. Children receiving formal childcare were distinguished from those receiving informal childcare. Children of mothers with low levels of education showed a consistent pattern of lower scores on academic readiness and achievement tests at 6 and 7 years than those of highly educated mothers, unless they received formal childcare. The findings provide further evidence suggesting that formal childcare could represent a preventative means of attenuating effects of disadvantage on children's early academic trajectory. Economic research shows that investment at this stage is both more effective and cost effective than interventions later in a child's life. An evaluation of Chicago Public Schools' federally funded Child Parent Centers find that for every $1 invested in the preschool program, nearly $11 is projected to return to society over the participants' lifetimes. This amount is equivalent to an 18% annual return.

Head Start Program, Title I of the Elementary and Secondary Education Act (ESEA), and various state-funded pre-kindergarten programs target students from low-income families in an attempt to equal the playing field for these children before school begins. In addition to increased access, there has also an increased national focus on raising quality standards for Head Start and state-funded pre-K programs, and in improving training and professional development for early care providers. There is substantial evidence pointing to early childhood development playing a huge role in closing the achievement gap: various studies, including the Carolina Abecedarian study, Child-Parent Center study, and HighScope Perry Preschool study, have shown that pre-K programs can have a positive and long-lasting impact on academic achievement of low-income and minority students. Furthermore, the role of early childhood education and development has been tied to success even out of the classroom. Pre-K programs help students develop social, emotional, and critical thinking skills at a young age, and while none of this prevents the effects of poverty, it does help in dampening the effects while also better preparing student for their future. Evaluations of Head Start have reported positive results. However, fade-out effects were found in Head Start.

Critics question whether an emphasis on early childhood education will benefit long-term kindergarten through 12th grade learning. Critics point to fade-out effects found in Head Start. Adam Schaeffer, a policy analyst with the Cato Institute highlights research shows that students make some gains in the first two years after preschool but it fades out after. Recent literature also reveals positive, short-term effects of early childhood education on children's development that weaken over time. However, Mary Ellen McGuire, an education policy director at think tank New America Foundations, pointed out that early childhood education isn't intended to be a silver-bullet fix to the educational system. It is merely one aspect. In order for those effects to last high-quality early childhood education needs to be connected to high-quality elementary schools.

=== Standards-based reform ===
Standards-based reform has been a popular strategy used to try to eliminate the achievement gap in recent years. The goal of this reform strategy is to raise the educational achievement of all students, not just minorities. Many states have adopted higher standards for student achievement. This type of reform focuses on scores on standardized tests, and these scores show that a disproportionate share of the students who are not meeting state achievement standards are Hispanic and African-American. Therefore, it is not enough for minorities to improve just as much as whites do—they must make greater educational gains in order to close the gap.

==== Goals 2000 ====
One example of standards-based reform was Goals 2000, also known as the Educate America Act. Goals 2000 was enacted in 1994 by President Clinton and allowed the federal government a new role in its support for education. It aimed to "provide a framework for meeting the National Education Goals". It was designed to provide resources to states and communities to make sure that all students achieved their full potential by the year 2000. This program set forth eight goals for American students, including all children in America will start school ready to learn, increasing the high school graduation rate to at least 90%, and increasing the standing of American students to first in the world in achievement in math and science. Goals 2000 also placed an emphasis on the importance of technology, promising that all teachers would have modern computers in their classroom and that effective software would be an integral part of the curriculum in every school. President George Bush's No Child Left Behind Act essentially replaced the Goals 2000 program.

==== No Child Left Behind ====
The No Child Left Behind Act (NCLB) legislation was signed by President Bush in January 2002 and dramatically expanded federal influence over the nation's more than 90,000 public schools. NCLB focuses on standardized test scores and school accountability to ensure that all students have the same educational opportunities. The main implications of this legislation were that states had to conduct annual student assessments linked to state standards to identify schools failing to make "adequate yearly progress" (AYP) toward the stated goal of having all students achieve proficiency in reading and math by 2013–2014 and to institute sanctions and rewards based on each school's AYP status. One of the motivations for this reform is that publicizing detailed information on school-specific performance and linking that "high-stakes" test performance to the possibility of sanctions will improve the focus and productivity of public schools. However, critics charge that test-based school accountability has several negative consequences for the broad cognitive development of children.

Critics argue that NCLB and other test-based accountability policies cause educators to shift resources away from important but non-tested subjects and to focus instruction in math and reading on the relatively narrow set of topics that are most heavily represented on the high-stakes tests. Some even suggest that high-stakes testing may lead school personnel to intentionally manipulate student test scores. This system has been criticized by some for being unfair toward schools that have the highest population of minority and poor students, as it is harder for these schools to meet the standards set by the No Child Left Behind Act, due to insufficient funding from either local, district, or state actors. This in turn leads to a cycle of underperformance and sanctions within these areas which furthers the problems that the Act meant to fix.

NCLB has shown mixed success in eliminating the racial achievement gap. Although test scores are improving, they are improving equally for all races, which means that minority students are still behind whites. There has also been some criticism as to whether an increase in test scores actually corresponds to improvements in education, since test standards vary from state to state and from year to year.

==== Race to the Top ====
In 2010, the Obama Administration instituted the Race to the Top (RTTT) program which provides financial incentives to states to produce measurable student gains. RTTT's primary goals are to improve student achievement, close achievement gaps, and improve high school graduation rates. The goals of both programs has been to close the achievement gap, but the RTTT has been more focused on closing the gap between higher and lower performing schools rather than focusing on a national approach. The major difference between the two educational reform programs is that RTTT is a competitive grant program that provides incentives for schools to change, while the NCLB Act mandated various changes in state and local education systems. The RTTT's approach is more adaptable and focused as it allows for individual actions between schools, and is meant to encourage reform within schools without resorting to punishments, whereas the No Child Left Behind Act relies on punishments as its main form of promoting reform in schools.

==== Common Core ====
Another attempt to standardize the education of students is the Common Core State Standards Initiative, also known as Common Core. The Common Core, created in 2009 and 2010, sets benchmarks for the skills that students should have by certain grade levels in subjects such as Math and Language Arts and the system itself is to meant to be a national baseline for how students are achieving. This baseline is meant to help establish what students need in order to achieve in higher education. While the standards are meant to be nationwide, they have only been adopted by 35 states as it is not mandatory for states to subscribe to the Common Core unless they desire federal grants. The Common Core Initiative has been criticized as it has not yielded any noticeable improvement in what has almost 10 years since it has been implemented, due to a multiple reasons, from incorrect implementation to content as the idea of a centralized system for education has been criticized for not taking the dynamic differences in learning-style into consideration.

==== Every Student Succeeds Act ====
The newest addition to the growing list of government-led initiatives has been the Every Student Succeeds Act (ESSA). The ESSA, enacted in December 2015, is Congress's replacement for the NCLB. The ESSA takes notes from both the RTTT and the NCLB, by keeping the standardized testing of the NCLB while allowing for the flexibility of the RTTT. The ESSA gives states more say in how schools are held accountable, and how states can act to fix issues at their schools, and as such, states can set long-term goals instead of having to worry about year-to-year performance issues as with the NCLB. States must still identify low performing schools and provide additional support, but now states can focus on long-term solutions. The new bill also focuses more on academic growth, which is subjective and does not always line up with a student's grade level, whereas the NCLB only cared whether students were performing to grade level. By combining the standardized test requirements of the NCLB while allowing for more state control like in the RTTT, the ESSA hopes to achieve long-lasting success and reform.

=== Institutional changes ===
Research has shown that making certain changes within schools can improve the performance of minority students. These include lowering class size in schools with a large population of minority students; expanding access to high-quality preschool programs to minority families; and focus on teaching the critical thinking and problem-solving skills that are necessary to retain high-level information.

==== School-based reform ====
Initiatives to close the achievement gap have been implemented at the school, district and state level in order to better address the issue. These include investments in pre-kindergarten programs, class size reduction, small schools, curricular reform, alignment of pre-kindergarten through college standards and expectations, and improved teacher education programs. Many schools have started implementing after-school activities such as tutoring sessions, remedial programs, and rapid assessment programs. These programs are meant to help minority students learn at a more accelerated rate in order to help them catch up to their peers. Other schools have started de-tracking their students in order to provide the same quality education for all students, regardless of race. De-tracking not only allows for all students to be taught in the same way, but it also opens up new opportunities for students who would be put on a certain career path by their education.

==== Charter schools ====
In the United States there are now 5,042 charter schools serving 1.5 million students in 39 states and Washington, D.C. Although they serve only a fraction of the nation's public school students, charter schools have seized a prominent role in education today. The question of whether charters or traditional public schools do a better job of educating students is still open to debate. The research is highly mixed due to the complexities of comparison and wide performance differences among charters.

Charter schools are by definition independent public schools. Although funded with taxpayer dollars, they operate free from many of the laws and regulations that govern traditional public schools. In exchange for that freedom, they are bound to the terms of a contract, or "charter," that lays out a school's mission, academic goals, and accountability procedures. The average charter school enrollment is 372, compared with about 478 in all public schools. Researchers have linked small schools with higher achievement, more individualized instruction, greater safety, and increased student involvement. With their relative autonomy, charter schools are also seen as a way to provide greater educational choice and innovation within the public school system. Another attraction of charter schools is that they often have specialized educational programs. Charters frequently take alternative curricular approaches, emphasize particular fields of study or serve special populations of students. That growth of charter schools has been particularly strong in cities. More than 55 percent of public charter schools were in urban settings. Some charters have high concentrations of minority students because demand for schooling alternatives is highest among such students, whom they say are often poorly served by the traditional public school systems. Lastly, another positive argument for charter schools is that they improve the existing school systems through choice and competition.

However, there are some criticisms of charter schools. There is a high variability in the quality and success of charter schools across the nation. A high-profile report from the American Federation of Teachers (2002), for example, argued that many charter school authorizers have failed to hold the administrators and teachers accountable, leaving some students to languish in low-performing schools. Another concern of critics is that charters are more racially segregated than traditional public schools, thus denying students the educational "benefits associated with attending diverse schools". Skeptics also worry that charter schools unfairly divert resources and policy attention from regular public schools.

Taken together, studies about charter schools are inconclusive and have mixed results. Studies by the Goldwater Institute and California State University-Los Angeles found that students in charter schools show higher growth in achievement than their counterparts in traditional public schools. However, another study by the Institute of Race and Poverty at the University of Minnesota Law show that after two decades of experience, most charter schools in the Twin Cities still underperform comparable traditional public schools and are highly segregated by race and income.

===== Non-English schools =====
To evade a shift to English, some Native American tribes have initiated language immersion schools for children, where a native Indian language is the medium of instruction. For example, the Cherokee Nation instigated a 10-year language preservation plan that involved growing new fluent speakers of the Cherokee language from childhood on up through school immersion programs as well as a collaborative community effort to continue to use the language at home. This plan was part of an ambitious goal that in 50 years, 80% or more of the Cherokee people will be fluent in the language. The Cherokee Preservation Foundation has invested $3 million into opening schools, training teachers, and developing curricula for language education, as well as initiating community gatherings where the language can be actively used. Formed in 2006, the Kituwah Preservation & Education Program (KPEP) on the Qualla Boundary focuses on language immersion programs for children from birth to fifth grade, developing cultural resources for the general public and community language programs to foster the Cherokee language among adults.

There is also a Cherokee language immersion school in Tahlequah, Oklahoma that educates students from pre-school through eighth grade. Because Oklahoma's official language is English, Cherokee immersion students are hindered when taking state-mandated tests because they have little competence in English. The Department of Education of Oklahoma said that in 2012 state tests: 11% of the school's sixth-graders showed proficiency in math, and 25% showed proficiency in reading; 31% of the seventh-graders showed proficiency in math, and 87% showed proficiency in reading; 50% of the eighth-graders showed proficiency in math, and 78% showed proficiency in reading. The Oklahoma Department of Education listed the charter school as a Targeted Intervention school, meaning the school was identified as a low-performing school but has not so that it was a Priority School. Ultimately, the school made a C, or a 2.33 grade point average on the state's A-F report card system. The report card shows the school getting an F in mathematics achievement and mathematics growth, a C in social studies achievement, a D in reading achievement, and an A in reading growth and student attendance. "The C we made is tremendous," said school principal Holly Davis, "[t]here is no English instruction in our school's younger grades, and we gave them this test in English." She said she had anticipated the low grade because it was the school's first year as a state-funded charter school, and many students had difficulty with English. Eighth graders who graduate from the Tahlequah immersion school are fluent speakers of the language, and they usually go on to attend Sequoyah High School where classes are taught in both English and Cherokee.

==== Private schools ====
Private schools are another institution used in attempt to narrow the racial achievement gap. A disparity between achievement gaps in private and public schools can be seen using a U.S. Department of Education database to compute the average National Assessment of Educational Progress test score differences between black students and white students in both public and private schools.

NAEP Achievement Differences for Public and Private Schools
NAEP Test Subject	Year	4th Grade Gap (Public)	12th Grade Gap (Public)	Percent Difference* Between 4th and 12th Grade Gaps (Public)	4th Grade Gap (Private)	12th Grade Gap (Private)	Percent Difference* Between 4th and 12th Grade Gaps (Private)
Reading	2002	29	25	−13.8	27	14	−48.1
Writing	2002	20	23	15	22	18	−18.2
Math	2000	30	33	10	28	23	−17.9
Science	2001	35	31	−11.4	27	20	−25.9

The table on white/Black NAEP Achievement Differences for Public and Private Schools above, shows a sizeable achievement gap between black and white fourth-graders in both public and private schools. However, the private-sector achievement gap is narrower in the 12th grade than the fourth grade for all of the core NAEP subjects. Public schools, on the other hand, see a larger gap in both writing and mathematics at the 12th-grade level than at the fourth. Averaged across subjects, the public school racial achievement gap is virtually unchanged between fourth and 12th grades, while the gap in private schools is an average of 27.5 percentage points smaller in the 12th grade than the fourth.

The achievement gap closes faster in private schools not because white private school students lose ground with respect to white public school students as they move to higher grades, but because black private school students learn at a substantially higher rate than black public school students. Economist Derek Neal has found that black students attending urban private schools are far more likely to complete high school, gain admission to college, and complete college than similar students in urban public schools. Similarly, in a study comparing graduation rates of all Milwaukee public school students (of all income levels) with those of the low-income participants in the city's private school voucher program, Manhattan Institute Senior Fellow Jay Greene found the voucher students were more than one-and-a-half-times as likely to graduate as public school students.

However, others argue that private schools actually perpetuate and exacerbate the achievement gap. Without controlling for student background differences, private schools scored higher than public schools. However, a study showed that demographic differences between students in public and private schools more than account for the relatively high scores of private schools. In fact, after controlling for these differences, the advantageous "private school effect" disappears and even reverses in most cases. Private schools have selective acceptance and a different demographic. Another criticism is that private schools only serve a small percent of the population and therefore cannot make a huge effect on closing the achievement gap.

Greg Wiggan believes that although there is a lot of research on the topic of the racial achievement gap, there is a gap in the research. Wiggan believes that the gap that is missing is the research of the perspective of the students, specifically high-achieving Black students in private schools.

==== Resources for poor school districts ====
Another explanation to address this educational gap is the lack of resources attainable by certain groups of students. A study found that there is a need for financial literacy for students enrolled in colleges and universities. Specifically, there is a need for student knowledge about loans, budgeting, and time requirements for degree completion. Focus group results in the same study concluded that students in search of financial aid information believe that there will be a lack of understanding among advisors and staff regarding minority student's cultural/identity based circumstances. As a result of this belief, many students rather just not seek any services.

On the high school level, a report finds that the more people of color enrolled at any particular school, the less likely that the school offers any computer science courses whatsoever. Nationwide economics indicate 1.3 million new jobs in the tech industry by 2022. Meanwhile, African Americans and Latinos only make up about 5 percent of the technical work force.

Supplemental funding for targeted disadvantaged school districts in Ohio showed a reduction in performance gaps between disadvantaged districts and other districts. Supplementing state funds for the districts with higher numbers of disadvantaged students produced benefits in the form of student achievement. IDAs, or individual development account initiatives, introduced in the 1990s to address poverty, were based on the belief that poor families should have access to asset development in order to break the cycle of poverty. As of now the main focus of most IDAs is on home ownership or starting small businesses. There has been a push for partnerships between community agencies and higher education institutions that would offer IDAs to encourage lower income individuals to turn towards higher education.

==== Teacher-focused reform ====
Another focus of reform directed toward the achievement gap has been on teacher development, as research shows that since teachers are responsible for almost every aspect of a child's education within the bounds of a classroom. Therefore, in order to best address the achievement gap, reform efforts based on improved teaching are one of the main strategies used to address the gap. This reform effort has been both top-down, in the form of higher state standards for teacher education and preparation, as well as bottom-up, through programs like Teach for America and AmeriCorps that aim to address educational inequity by recruiting and training teachers specifically to work in high-needs schools.

==== Teach For America ====
Teach for America (TFA) recruits and selects graduates from some of the top colleges and universities across the country to teach in the nation's most challenging K-12 schools throughout the nation. It began in 1990 with 500 teachers and has since expanded to over 4,000 teacher placements in 2010. In the Journal of Policy Analysis and Management they use individual-level student data linked to teacher data in North Carolina to estimate the effects of having a TFA teacher compared to a traditional teacher. According to studies about the effect of different teacher-preparation programs in Louisiana, North Carolina, and Tennessee, TFA is among the most effective sources of new teachers in low-income communities. Each of these statewide studies, conducted between 2009 and 2012, found that corps members often help their students achieve academic gains at rates equal to or larger than those for students of more veteran teachers. The findings show that TFA teachers are in general more effective, according to student exam scores, than traditional teachers that would be in the classroom in their stead. These estimates demonstrate that, compared with traditional teachers with similar levels of experience, TFA teachers have strong positive effects on student test scores. And despite the limitations of TFA teachers, they are no worse than average traditional teachers in teaching math subjects and much more effective in teaching science subjects.

Although TFA teachers tend to have stronger academic credentials, they have not been taught in traditional training programs, are more likely to teach for a few years, and are assigned to some of the most challenging schools in the country. Given these differences, the TFA program has been controversial. Critics of Teach For America point out two of the major problems. The first is that most TFA teachers have not received traditional teacher training. TFA corps members participate in an intensive five-week summer national institute and a two-week local orientation and induction program prior to their first teaching assignment, and therefore some argued they are not as prepared for the demands of the classroom as traditionally trained teachers. The second criticism is that TFA requires only a two-year teaching commitment, and the majority of corps members leave at the end of that commitment. The short tenure of TFA teachers is troubling because research shows that new teachers are generally less effective than more experienced teachers.

==== Narrowing the achievement gap through technology ====
Computer and technology use have been linked to increased student achievement. "When teachers and administrators make a sustained commitment to the use of computers in the classroom, student achievement increases (Mann & Shafer, 1997). Randomized experiments demonstrate that the performance of low-achieving students can be improved by using technology that adjusts the level of difficulty of the books and math problems that are presented to each student, raises the probability that each student will achieve high scores on end-of-book reading comprehension quizzes and high accuracy scores on daily math assignments, raises the probability that each student can earn high letter grades, and creates a structured environment where each student is likely to receive regular, objective, positive feedback signaling that he or she is advancing on a daily basis, promoting high self-efficacy and a strong sense of control over academic outcomes. This demonstrates that it is possible to increase engagement, effort and performance, even when the tasks presented to each student become progressively more difficult, if technology is used to individualize task difficulty and create a structure where it is possible for all students to achieve high reading comprehension and math accuracy scores on a regular basis. A comparison of the cost-effectiveness of this approach indicates that it is more efficient than 22 other strategies for raising student achievement.

Generally, those students who enrolled and finished online courses were older college students. Also, these students have better chance to perform higher self-efficacy scores (Xie & Huang, 2014) and future career ambitions or higher incomes (Carr, 2000; Park & Choi, 2009). Studies shows that online learners are tend to less likely to make friends and become socialized (Varela et al., 2012), while there's possible cause for example the experience of disappointing relationships in the context of education (Romero & Usart, 2014). As Friedman (2007) claimed that the world is flat, online education has made the education becomes more accessible for a wider range of students. But there's also some counterpoints of online education for example: lack of technical support (Palmer & Holt, 2010; Yang & Cornelius, 2014); inadequate teacher support (Palmer & Holt, 2010); feeling of isolation (Reilly, Gallagher-Lepak, & Killion, 2012; Tucker, 2014; Yang & Cornelius, 2004).

Using technology as a tool for narrowing the achievement gap begins with a purpose, communication, listening, and collaboration. These skills can be achieved through the use of weblogs, social networking sites, feeds, and myriad other multimedia. In classrooms, students can communicate internally, or they can work side by side with others who are located thousands of miles away. Through the use of technology, presentations can be archived so that the material can be reviewed at any time. "All teachers could record important parts of what they do in the classroom that can then be archived to the class Weblog and used by students who may have missed the class or just want a refresher on what happened." (Richardson, p. 117)

Having access to information on the web gives students an advantage to learning. "Students at all levels show more interest in their work and their ability to locate and reflect upon their work is greatly enhanced as are the opportunities for collaborative learning" (Richardson, p. 28). Weblogs are different from posts or comments; they require students to analyze and synthesize the content and communicate their understanding with the audience responses in mind.

Technology has been incorporated into the Standards. Even though the NCLB Act holds school districts accountable for student achievement, there are still many students who do not have the resources at home to fully take part in these excellent educational tools. Some teachers feel that technology is not the solution and see it as a risk. Therefore, technology is not always being used to its fullest potential by teachers and students do not gain the advantages technology offers. "Given the fact that the amount of information going online shows no sign of slowing, if they are unable to consistently collect potentially relevant information for their lives and careers and quickly discern what of that information is most useful, they will be at a disadvantage." (Richardson, p. 73).

According to the U.S. Census, by 2012, it is estimated that 70% of homes will have broadband access. While this is a large percentage, it still leaves 30% of households without internet access. The government has lent its hand in closing the Global Achievement Gap by granting funding for low-income school districts for programs such as one-on-one computing, however, the fact that many of these students do not have online capability at home is still a main issue. This digital divide may cause the achievement gap to increase as technology continues to become heavily integrated in the daily coursework for school children. Students need to have Internet access outside of school on a regular basis to successfully complete challenging coursework.

According to National Center for Education Statistics, it noted that African American 12th grade male students had the lowest reading scores among other racial and ethnic group. Reading gaps between African Americans and Whites have increased from 1992 to present (National Center for Education Statistics, 2016). Tonsing-Meyer (2012) claimed that the reading and writing practice was specified and emphasized in 85% of online course assignment, with activities attached, which might improve this situation.

Students who have problems with technology interfered are more likely to withdraw from their online courses (Bambara et al., 2009). Also, there's no sufficient technology support which will also leads students to drop the class since their problems could not be solved quickly (Palmer & Holt, 2010; Yang & Cornelius, 2004).

Students who were more focused and engaged themselves to the class tends to receive higher grades; their self-confidence can be gained through daily life use of Internet (Sahin & Shelley, 2008). Male online learners had higher Internet self-efficacy than female, while they participated less in discussions (Chang et al., 2014; Ong & Lai, 2006).

As Fletcher (2015) indicated, possible factors that helped African American college students to gain academic success via online education might be: positive pre-college educational experiences, supportive environments in college campus, involving in campus activities, positive faculty interactions and support, same race/gender relationships with peers, family support, self-confidence, future career ambitions and the ability to face racism.

==== College environment ====
Students of color like African American students need a color-blind environment to support them reaching towards academic success better. In this way, they are more likely to gain self-confidence and educational resilience (Tucker, 2014).

==== Interventions for non-cognitive factors ====
Many different types of interventions can be done to help students who are a part of a negative stereotype. One example is a self-affirmation intervention. This intervention was expected to help improve the academic performance of a group of at-risk students. It was tested in two different double-blind field experiences, and then compared. For African American students who were a part of the control condition and who saw their performance declining early in the term, their performance did not improve as the term went on, and in fact it got worse. One thing that could lead to a slight improvement is having a small reduction in the psychological threats. Having just one intervention one time does not have a positive effect on a student. Small interventions were seen to have a greater effect when they were carried out in multiple trials, different times.

== Other items ==
=== Recent Developments ===
Impact of the COVID-19 Pandemic: Recent studies indicate that the pandemic has exacerbated existing educational inequalities. For instance, a study by Harvard, Stanford, and Dartmouth found that affluent districts have recovered more effectively than impoverished areas, widening the achievement gap. Conversely, some districts, like Compton, California, have made notable progress through targeted interventions such as hiring additional tutors and implementing extensive tutoring programs.

=== Progress and Persistent Disparities ===
While there have been significant milestones in Black political representation and economic progress, disparities persist, particularly in economic well-being. The median household wealth for Black families remains significantly lower than that of white families, highlighting the need for continued efforts to address socio-economic challenges.

== See also ==
- Achievement gap in the United States
- Educational inequality in the United States
- Education in the United States
- Knowledge is Power Program
- Racial inequality in the United States
- Racial segregation in the United States § Education
- YES Prep Public Schools
- Harmony Public Schools
