= Michigan State Historic Preservation Office =

State agency of Michigan, US

Agency overview
- Formed: 1966
- Jurisdiction: State of Michigan
- Headquarters: 735 East Michigan Avenue Lansing, Michigan 48912
- Parent agency: Michigan Economic Development Corporation

The Michigan State Historic Preservation Office is one of 59 state historic preservation offices established according to the National Historic Preservation Act of 1966 that plays a role in implementing federal historic preservation policy in the United States. The purposes of a SHPO include surveying and recognizing historic properties, reviewing nominations for properties to be included in the National Register of Historic Places, reviewing federal and state undertakings for their impact on historic resources, and supporting federal organizations, state and local governments, and private sector in historic preservation matters.

The organization was formerly involved in the listing of state historic sites and operating the state's historical marker program; that function is now performed by the Michigan History Center and Eastern Michigan University.

== Administration ==
The Michigan State Historic Preservation Office has administered by the Michigan Economic Development Corporation since August 11, 2019.

== See also ==
- List of Michigan State Historic Sites
- List of National Historic Landmarks in Michigan
- National Register of Historic Places listings in Michigan
