= The Black Star Project =

American nonprofit

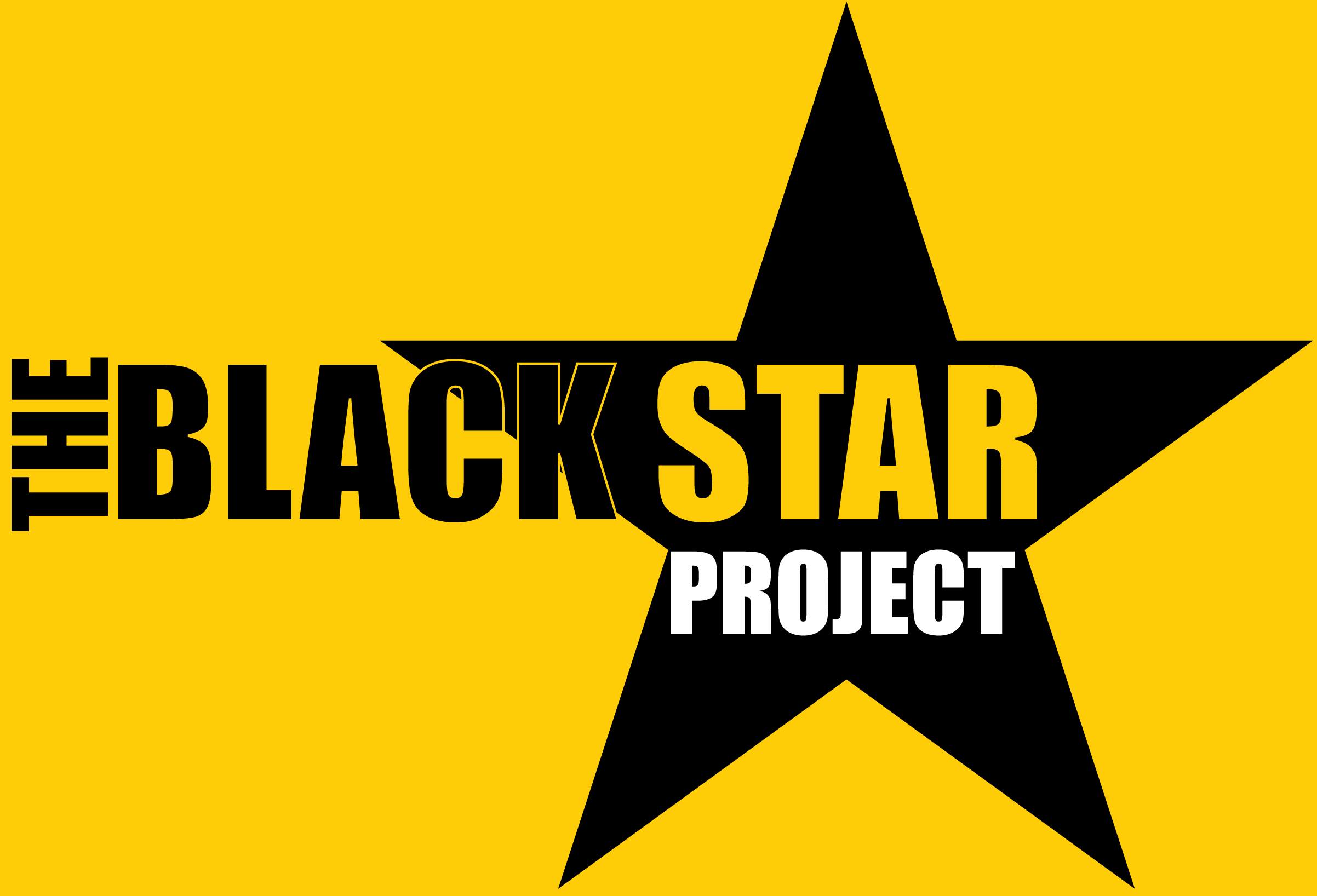
- Formation: 1996; 30 years ago
- Founder: Phillip Jackson
- Type: non-profit organization
- Purpose: Improving the lives of young African American and Latinos in Chicago.
- Headquarters: Chicago, Illinois, U.S.
- Website: blackstarproject.org

Founded by Phillip Jackson in 1996, the Black Star Project is an educational nonprofit reform organization located in the Bronzeville neighborhood of Chicago. Its focus is to eliminate the racial academic achievement gap by improving the lives of those living in African American and Latino communities. By providing mentoring and tutoring services, the Black Star Project ensures that students, parents, and community people become productive citizens in their neighborhoods. The project focuses on one-on-one interactions with students; but also involves parents so that they can have positive influences on their children's education. The Black Star Project provides a range of activities including parent and mentoring programs, school outreach programs, special events and national initiatives.

== Programs ==
The Black Star Project has a selection of diverse programs for children, parents, and community members listed on the Black Star Project's official website. The academic programs that are offered for African American youth include Saturday University, Math Boot Camp, Private Tutoring and reading academy. There are also parent programs like the Million Father's March, Father's Club and Parent University. The mentoring programs and special events are put in place in order to bring the African American and Latino communities together.

In the end, the organization hopes to improve the lives of African American youth by focusing on education reform and fair discipline policies. On June 24, 2017, the Black Star Project started their fourth annual ceremony for black males’ graduation. At a Mass Black Male Graduation and a Transition to Manhood Ceremony, Philip Jackson outlines the Black Star Project's vision "To improve violence in Chicago, the best way to improve our city, is to improve these young men."

=== Academic programs ===
The academic programs include Saturday University, Math Boot Camp, Private Tutoring, and a reading academy for youth. All the students must register online. The academic programs are free except for private tutoring.

==== Saturday University ====
Saturday University launched in the Spring of 2011, consists of voluntary tutors, workers and organizers. It focuses on improving academic performance for African American youths through offering free math, reading and writing sessions. The program is based on a network of Saturday schools and completely free for children of all races to join for 10 weeks. The class sizes usually have 15-20 students ranged from kindergarteners to high schoolers. The session holds at The Black Star Project's headquarters at 3509 D Martin Luther King DR, but the locations have extended to the communities that far from the headquarter, in a purpose to benefit more kids.

==== Math Boot Camp ====
The 2013 National Assessment for Educational Progress (NAEP) reports that, in Chicago, African American children are below a basic level in mathematics performing. Math Boot Camps focuses on 5th through 8th grade students for math tutoring in order strengthen basic math conception and problem solving.

==== Private tutoring ====
Private tutoring is focused on assessing the areas that students need help in, and matching students with specialized tutors. This is a charged one-on-one private tutoring program for students in kindergarten through 12 grade. Students must available to schedule as low as one hour each week.

==== Black Male Reading Academy ====
This program is targeted toward elementary school children who are in 1st to 4th grade. Reading academy focuses on developing comprehension and vocabulary. The National Assessment for Educational Progress report shows that reading proficiency is below a basic level in 8th grade, within Chicago's African American community. The Black Males Reading Academy aims to build a positive life and hopeful future.

=== Parent programs ===
The parent programs include Million Father's March, Father's Club.

==== Million Father's March ====
One of the Black Star Project's national initiative is the Million Father March that started in 2004. In this program fathers, uncles, grandfathers, and father figures accompany children on their first day of school. Due to this initiative, an increase was seen in 2004 and in 2007 on the first-day of school attendance. It went up from 86% to 93%.

==== Fathers Club ====
This club strives to create affordable events for fathers to spend quality time with their children. Philip Jackson, the founder, and executive director created this program because of the recognition of the importance of a male figure in a child's life. The Black Star Project holds events around the Chicago area to build bonding experience for father to children relationships. Different events that have been held were at the University of Illinois at Chicago (UIC) Pavilion, Brookfield Zoo, Shedd Aquarium.
