= Southeast Michigan =

Region of US state

- Lower Peninsula of Michigan
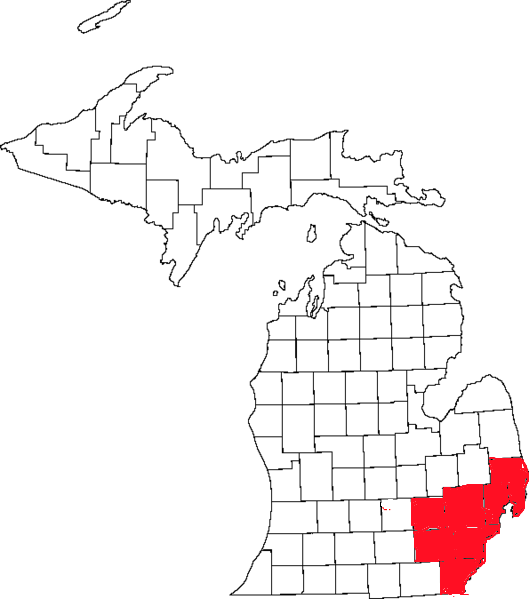
- Metro Detroit lies within southeast Michigan.
- Country: United States
- State: Michigan

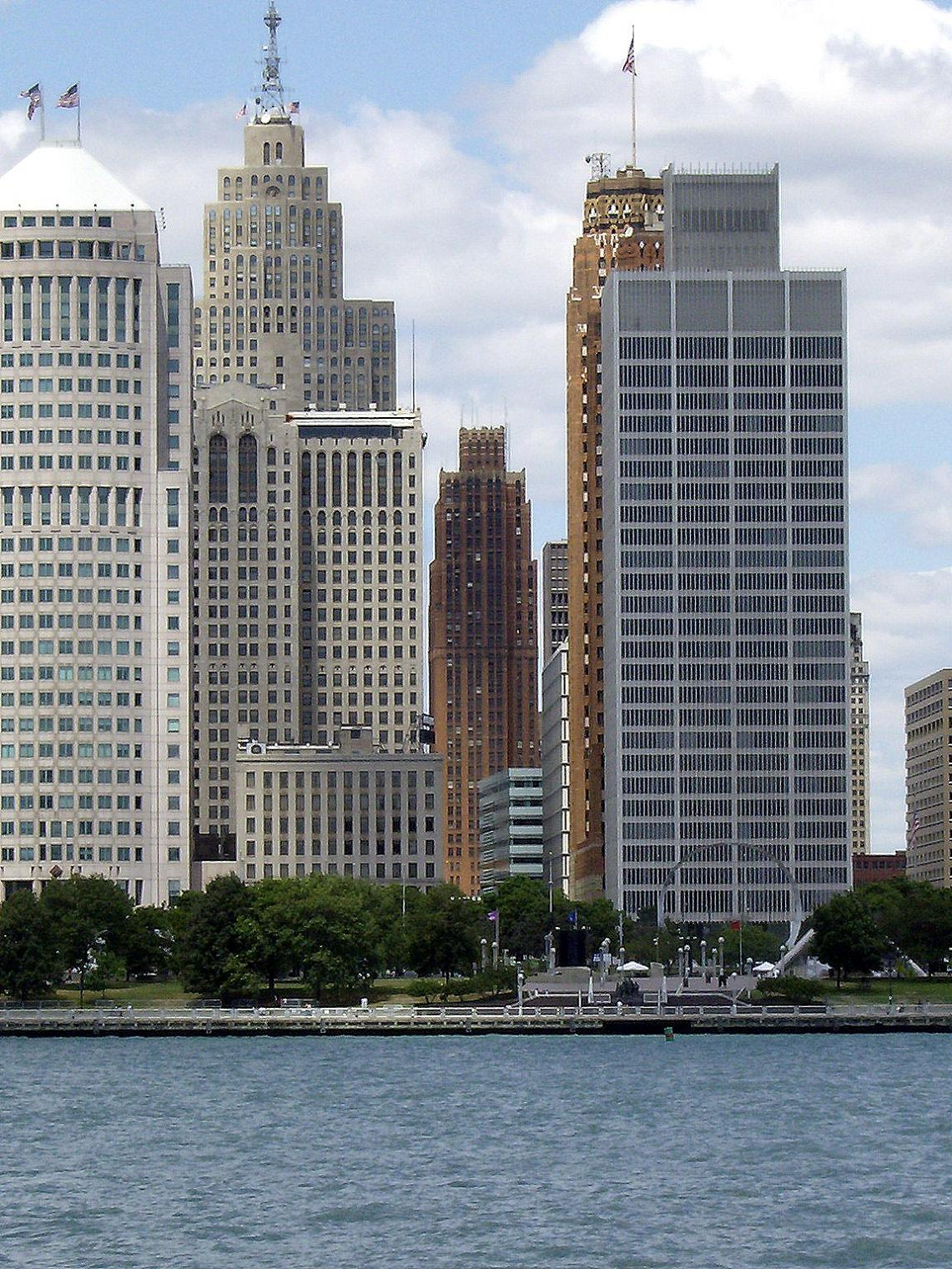
Financial District in downtown Detroit

Southeast Michigan, also called southeastern Michigan, is a region in the Lower Peninsula of Michigan that is home to a majority of the state's businesses and industries as well as slightly over half of the state's population, most of whom are concentrated in Metro Detroit.

== Geography ==
It is bordered in the northeast by Lake St. Clair, to the south-east Lake Erie, and the Detroit River which connects these two lakes.

=== Principal cities ===
- Detroit, the state's largest city (and the nation's eighteenth-largest) and the county seat of Wayne County.
- Mount Clemens, the county seat of Macomb County.
- Pontiac, the county seat of Oakland County.

==== Other important cities within the core counties of Oakland, Macomb, and Wayne ====
- Birmingham
- Dearborn
- Livonia
- Novi
- Romulus, home to Detroit Metro Airport
- Royal Oak
- Southfield
- Sterling Heights, the fourth-largest city (by population) in Michigan.
- Troy
- Warren, third-largest city (by population) in Michigan, location of General Motors Technical Center, the United States Army Tank-Automotive and Armaments Command (TACOM), the Tank Automotive Research, Development and Engineering Center (TARDEC), the National Automotive Center (NAC).
- West Bloomfield Township

=== Outlying cities ===
Some cities are considered within southeast Michigan, while also being a part of another region or metropolitan area. The following cities tend to identify themselves separately from southeast Michigan and are isolated from the core counties of Oakland, Macomb, and Wayne.

- Adrian, county seat of Lenawee County and home of Adrian College, Siena Heights University.
- Hillsdale, county seat of Hillsdale County located between the southeast and southwest corners of the state.
- Howell, county seat of Livingston County located between Metro Detroit and the Greater Lansing areas.
- Jackson, county seat of Jackson County also considered to be a part of Greater Lansing.
- Monroe, county seat of Monroe County.
- Port Huron, county seat of St. Clair County, also considered to be part of the Thumb.
- Saline, a community in Washtenaw County.

== Metropolitan area ==
With 4,488,335 people in 2010, Metro Detroit was the tenth-largest metropolitan area in the United States, while Ann Arbor's metropolitan area ranked 141st with 341,847. Metropolitan areas of southeast Michigan, and parts of the Thumb and Flint/Tri-Cities, are grouped together by the U.S. Census Bureau with Detroit-Warren-Livonia MSA in a wider nine-county region designated the Detroit–Ann Arbor–Flint Combined Statistical Area (CSA) with a population of 5,428,000.

=== Combined Statistical Area ===
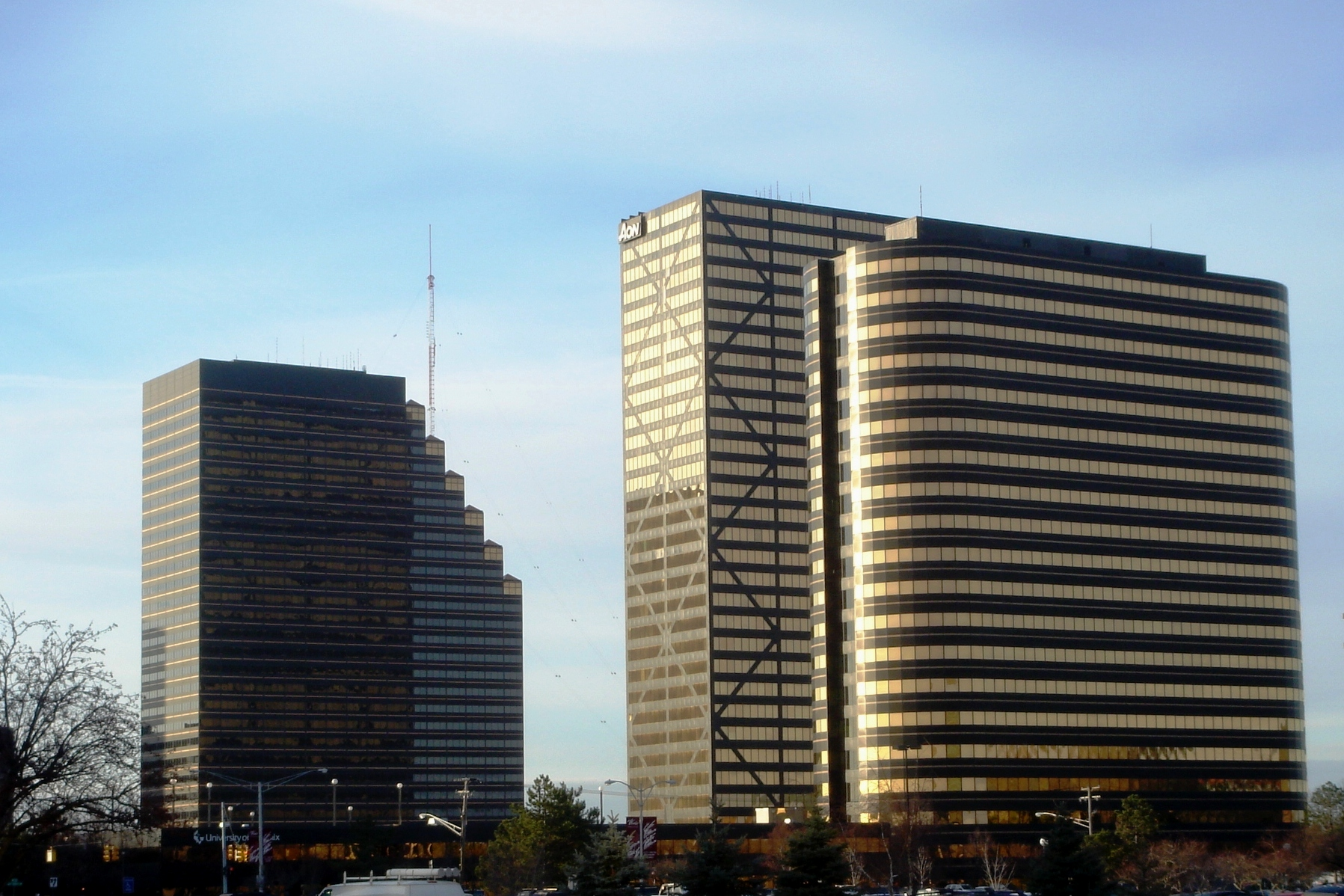
Southfield Town Center

- Genesee County
- Lapeer County
- Lenawee County (removed from the CSA in 2001 but relisted in 2013)
- Livingston County*
- Macomb County*
- Monroe County*
- Oakland County*
- Saint Clair County*
- Washtenaw County*
- Wayne County*

*Denotes member counties of the Southeast Michigan Council of Governments (SEMCOG)

== Economy ==
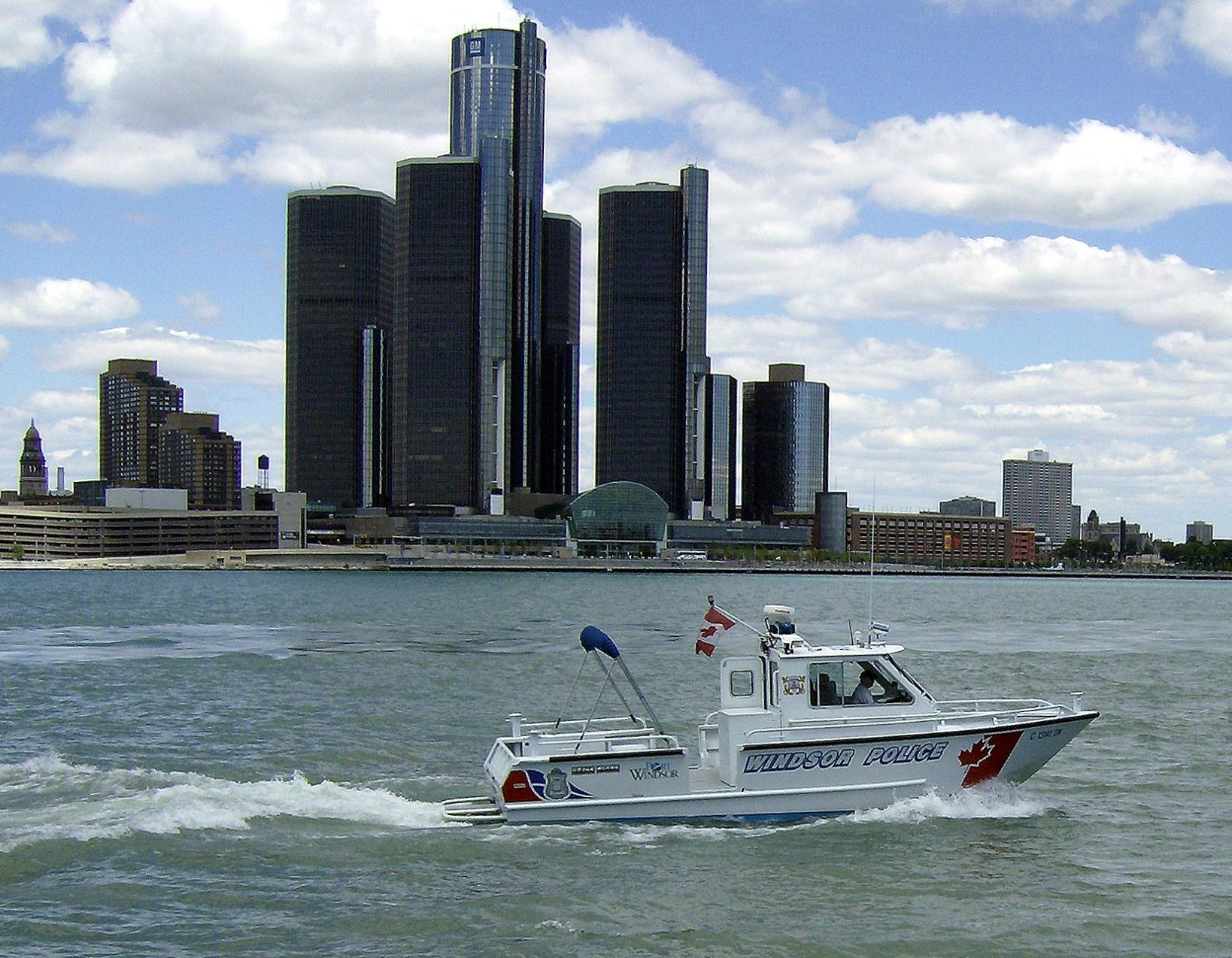
The Renaissance Center, General Motors world headquarters

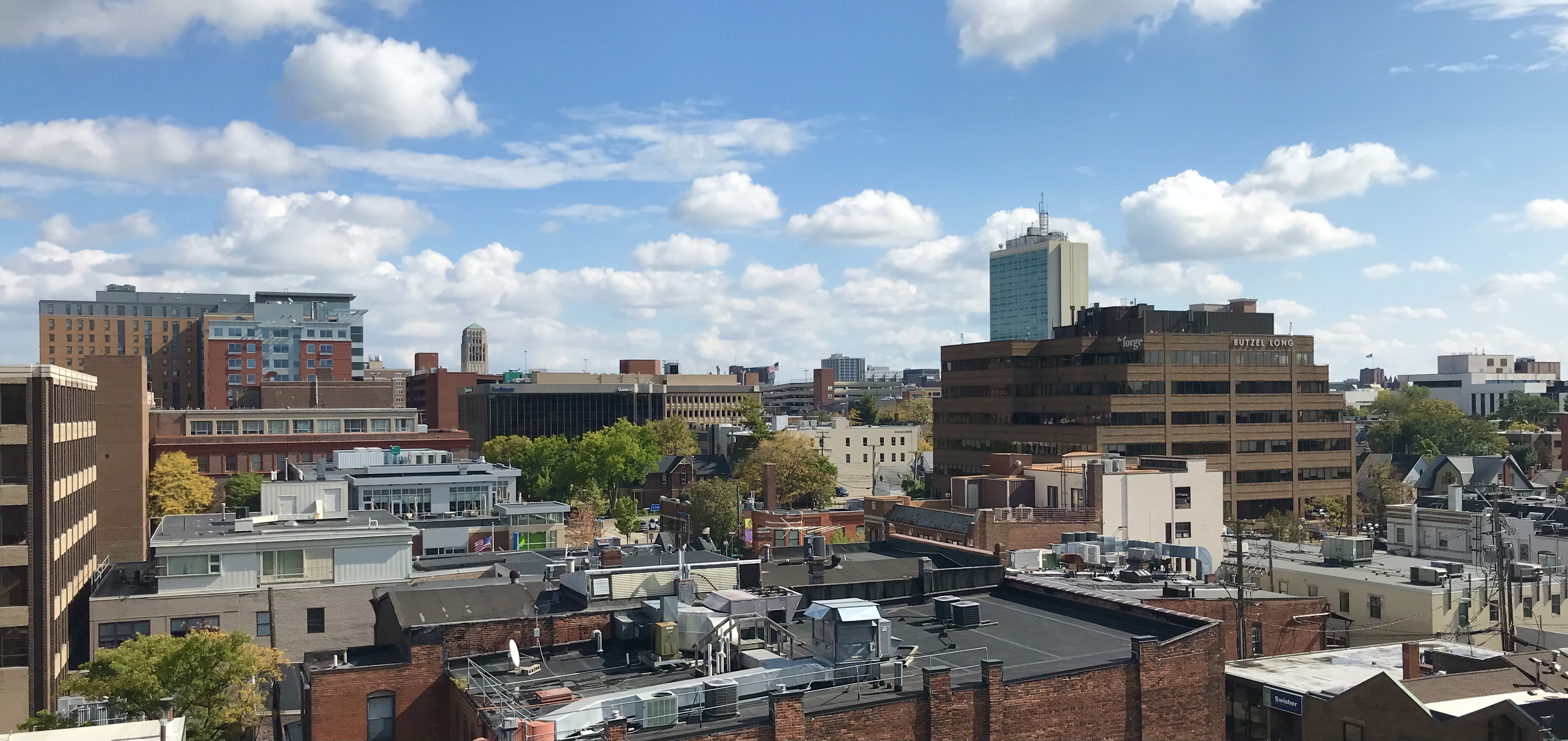
Ann Arbor, home to the University of Michigan's main campus

The main economic activity is manufacturing cars. Major manufacturing cities are Warren, Sterling Heights, Dearborn (Henry Ford's childhood home) and Detroit, also called "Motor City" or "Motown". Other economic activities include banking and other service industries. Most people in Livingston, Macomb, Monroe, Oakland, Washtenaw, and Wayne Counties live in urban areas. In the recent years, urban sprawl has affected the areas of Canton, Commerce, Chesterfield, and Macomb townships. The metropolitan area is also home to some of the highest ranked hospitals and medical centers, Such as the Detroit Medical Center(DMC), Henry Ford Hospital, Beaumont Hospital, and the University of Michigan hospital in Ann Arbor.

SEMCOG Commuter Rail is a proposed regional rail link between Ann Arbor and Detroit.

The Detroit Metro Airport is the busiest in the area with the opening of the McNamara terminal and the now completed North Terminal. The airport is located in Romulus.

Manufacturing and service industries have replaced agriculture for the most part. In rural areas of Saint Clair County, Monroe, and Livingston Counties still grow crops such as corn, sugar beets, soy beans, other types of beans, and fruits. Romeo and northern Macomb County is well known for its apple and peach orchards.

== Media ==
Radio

Most major Detroit radio stations, such as WJR and WWJ, can be heard in most or all of southeastern Michigan. Port Huron, Howell, Ann Arbor/Ypsilanti, Adrian, and Monroe are also served by their own locally-originating stations. National Public Radio is broadcast locally from Ann Arbor on Michigan Radio WUOM 91.7 FM and from Detroit on WDET-FM 101.9 FM.

Television

Major television stations include: WJBK Fox 2 Detroit (Fox), WXYZ Channel 7 (ABC), WDIV Local 4 (NBC), WWJ-TV CBS 62 (CBS) and WKBD CW 50 (CW).

Newspaper

Daily editions of the Detroit Free Press and The Detroit News are available throughout the area.

== See also ==
- Educational inequality in Southeast Michigan
