= Michigan Economic Development Corporation =

State agency of Michigan, US

The Michigan Economic Development Corporation (MEDC) is a public-private partnership agency and economic development corporation in the U.S. state of Michigan. Operating under the slogan "Pure Michigan", MEDC attempts to encourage the tourism potential of the state and foster business relocations to Michigan.

MEDC is the successor-in-interest of the Michigan Jobs Commission, created in 1993. The commission was translated into the Development Corporation in 1999. Its growth and operations during the following twenty years reflected the urgency of moving away from Michigan's perceived standing as a one-industry state dependent on fluctuating conditions in the motor vehicle industry.

== See also ==
- Educational inequality in southeast Michigan
