= Unequal Childhoods =

2003 book by Annette Lareau

Unequal Childhoods: Class, Race, and Family Life
- First Edition Cover
- Author: Annette Lareau
- Language: English
- Subject: Sociology; American Studies; Ethnic Studies
- Genre: non-fiction
- Publisher: University of California Press
- Publication date: September 2003
- Publication place: United States
- Pages: 343
- ISBN: 0-520-23950-4
- OCLC: 315483187
- Dewey Decimal: 305.23 21
- LC Class: HQ767.9 .L37 2003

Unequal Childhoods: Class, Race, and Family Life is a 2003 non-fiction book by American sociologist Annette Lareau based upon a study of 88 African American and white families (of which only 12 were discussed) to understand the impact of how social class makes a difference in family life, more specifically in children's lives.

== Methodology ==
Lareau and her graduate researchers followed these families around in their daily lives. They attended sporting events, spent the night in the family's home, and attended a doctor's visit to observe the differences between the working- and lower-class families, and middle-class families. During her observations, she notices two different parenting styles.

In her follow-up with families ten years later, Lareau admits that the ideal study would have involved on-going participant observation, but that was not feasible given the resources and time investment of the families that would have required. Instead, she conducted two hour recorded interviews with each of the twelve children, and had separate interviews with each of the mothers, fathers and siblings that agreed to be interviewed. Some declined.

In response to the second edition of the book, critics continue to comment on the limitations of this study given its small sample size, while applying broad theoretical conclusions to North American society. Lareau briefly addresses race factors having an influence on outcomes for youth, but claims the class factors play a more significant role.

== Parenting styles ==
Annette Lareau distinguishes between two different parenting styles: Concerted Cultivation and the Accomplishment of Natural Growth.

Concerted Cultivation: The parenting style, favored by middle-class families, in which parents encourage negotiation and discussion and the questioning of authority, and enroll their children in extensive organized activity participation. This style helps children in middle-class careers, teaches them to question people in authority, develops a large vocabulary, and makes them comfortable in discussions with people of authority. However, it gives the children a sense of entitlement.

Accomplishment of Natural Growth: The parenting style, favored by working-class and lower-class families, in which parents issue directives to their children rather than negotiations, encourage the following and trusting of people in authority positions, and do not structure their children's daily activities, but rather let the children play on their own.This method has benefits that prepare the children for a job in the "working" or "poor-class" jobs, teaches the children to respect and take the advice of people in authority, and allows the children to become independent at a younger age.

== Reviews ==
- Margaret Foley, "Class Matters", "Mother's Movement Online", October, 2005.
- Harry Brighouse, "David Brooks on Annette Lareau’s Unequal Childhoods", "Crooked Timber", March 12, 2006; BW05
- Elizabeth Lower-Basch, "Review: Unequal Childhoods", "Half Changed World", May 4, 2005
- Gladwell, M. (2008). Outliers: The story of success. New York: Little, Brown and Co.
- Linda Quirke, "Book Review of Unequal Childhoods:Class, Race, and Family Life, Second Edition with an Update a Decade Later. (https://ejournals.library.ualberta.ca/index.php/CJS/article/viewFile/16651/13567), Berkeley: University of California Press, pp480, 2011

== See also ==
- Concerted cultivation
- Middle class
- Working class
- Social class
