= Annette Lareau =

American sociologist

Annette P. Lareau
- Born: December 28, 1952 (age 73)
- Occupations: Sociologist, author
- Writing career
- Subject: Sociology

Annette Patricia Lareau (born December 28, 1952) is a sociologist working at the University of Pennsylvania.

She has completed extensive field work studying the daily lives of African-Americans and European-Americans. She is also credited with the creation of the term concerted cultivation. This concept refers to middle class child rearing practices. She says that this differs from the parents of children in working-class families, who attribute much of their child raising tactics to the accomplishment of natural growth.

== Education ==
Lareau is a graduate of U.C. Santa Cruz and earned her PhD in sociology from U.C. Berkeley. She started her career at Southern Illinois University at Carbondale and also previously worked as a professor of sociology at Temple University, Pennsylvania from 1990 to 2005. She has served as a professor of sociology at the University of Maryland, College Park, and in 2008 joined as professor of sociology at the University of Pennsylvania where she is the Stanley I. Sheerr Professor. During the 2005–2006 school year she moved to Palo Alto, California to complete a residence at the Center for Advanced Study of Behavioral Sciences. Lareau has been very active with organizations such as the Eastern Sociological Society, Sociology of Education journal, and the American Sociological Association.

== Writings ==
Lareau is the author of Home Advantage: Social Class and Parental Intervention in Elementary Education (1989), co-editor of Journeys through Ethnography: Realistic Accounts of Fieldwork (1996), and author of Unequal Childhoods: Class, Race, and Family Life (2003). She conducted field work between 1993 and 1995 with 10- and 11-year-old children, and followed up with them 10 years later when the children were 20 and 21 years old.

=== Unequal Childhoods ===
Her field research was the basis for her book Unequal Childhoods, which explained in detail her research and interviews with 88 children and their parents. The subjects included white and black children from middle class, working class, and poor families. Through her observations she discovered differences in parenting styles that related to class distinctions. Specifically, she observed how different family circumstances influenced the children's performance and interactions in and out of school. Her findings allowed her to draw a major distinction between the parenting styles of working class / poor parents and middle-class parents. In this book, she highlights the benefits and shortcomings of raising children through either concerted cultivation or natural growth.

"Concerted cultivation" is the type of childrearing that middle-class parents practice. This childrearing practice consists of parents participating in the organization of their child's afterschool activities and providing a structured life for their child. The parents generally have a better education and try to impress this upon their child on a daily basis. Parents teach their children things that are not taught in school that will help them to perform better and get better grades on tests and ultimately do better in school. The main advantage to this type of childrearing is that children are taught lessons through organized activities that help prepare them for a white collar job and the types of interactions that a white-collar worker encounters. Some examples of this type of parental teaching is engagement in critical thinking such as asking challenging questions, the use of advanced grammar, and help a stronger family support structure. The main disadvantage of concerted cultivation is that often the child becomes bored easily and cannot entertain themselves.

"The Accomplishment of Natural Growth" is the type of childrearing that working class and poor parents practice, and not necessarily by choice. They are less involved with the structure of their child's after school activities and generally have less education and time to impress values upon their children that will give them an advantage in school. This type of childrearing involves less organized activities and more free time for their children to play with other children in the neighborhood.

The book Unequal Childhoods includes detailed descriptions of her encounters and organized data from her analysis. She compiled a list of formal and informal activities that specific children were involved in, whether they were middle class, working class, or poor, and whether they have requested a teacher for their children. There is also information about whether or not the parents knew people who are psychologists, doctors, lawyers, or teachers. The book contains a great deal of quotes, stories of her experiences while observing, and connections that explain why particular children might act a certain way. Each chapter is an in-depth analysis of a different family, concerning the specific situation surrounding the child and how it has affected their life. From all her observations and analysis, Lareau concludes that the different types of childrearing have more to do with class than race. Through her research she has found that the childrearing ways of the middle class perpetuate inequality because of the advantages that the children have through participation in extracurricular activities, engagement in critical thinking and problem solving. These practices of more parental involvement are what perpetuate inequalities from one generation to the next. Lareau stresses the importance of parents being involved in their children's lives and talks about how middle class children benefit from having a sense of entitlement and the practice of gaining access to scarce resources. She also stresses the importance of literacy as a huge factor in a child's success. A second edition of the book was released in September 2011; it added over 100 new pages of text to the original version.

== Data collection process ==
In 1989–1990 Lareau observed white and black children from two third-grade classrooms in a small Midwestern town, Lawrenceville, and interviewed their mothers, fathers, and guardians, as well as school professionals working with the children. In 1992–1993 she received a grant from the Spencer Foundation to study a third grade classroom in Lower Richmond, an urban school district. In order to do this, she hired and trained five research assistants in 1993, who would carry out in-depth interviews with the families. Lareau and her research team studied 88 African-American and white families, and later chose 12 of the 88 families for more intensive visits. During the study, they visited the 12 families 20 times each, roughly two to three hours at a time, and accompanied them on various outings and appointments. Lareau conducted about half of the interviews, and did many family visits. Lareau wrote the first draft of her book Unequal Childhoods and completed the first edition of the book by 2002. Unequal Childhoods was discussed by Malcolm Gladwell in his book Outliers.

A second edition of Unequal Childhoods was published in 2011, to which Lareau added over 100 pages. She traced the lives of the 12 children whose families were observed into adulthood. With Elliot Weininger and Dalton Conley, she also reported national data on children's participation in organized activities which affirmed the findings of her ethnographic study.

== Other works ==
In 2014, Lareau published Choosing Homes, Choosing Schools, which she edited with Kimberly Goyette. The book was published by the Russell Sage Foundation. It reports on the results of a number of studies of how residential decisions facilitate the maintenance of social inequality. On the book's back cover, Sean Reardon, Professor of Sociology and Education at Stanford University called it "a 'must-read' for urban sociologists and educational policy makers interested in understanding modern American inequality, segregation, and educational opportunity".

== Awards ==
Lareau's first book, Home Advantage, won the Sociology of Education Award for Scholarship of the American Sociological Association. It also won the AESA Critic's Choice award from the American Educational Studies Association.

For Unequal Childhoods, she won the Sociology of Culture Section Best Book Award as well as the William J. Goode Best Book Length Contribution to Family Sociology Award, both from the American Sociological Association.

In 2004, she won the American Sociological Association Section on Children and Youth Distinguished Contribution to Scholarship Award.

Lareau served as President of the American Sociological Association between 2013 and 2014.

== See also ==
- Concerted cultivation
- Educational inequality
- Hidden curriculum
- Parenting styles
