= After-school activity =

Type of educational activity

After-school activities, also known as after-school programs or after-school care, started in the early 1900s mainly just as supervision of students after the final school bell. Today, after-school programs do much more. There is a focus on helping students with school work but can be beneficial to students in other ways. An after-school program, today, will not limit its focus on academics but with a holistic sense of helping the student population. An after-school activity is any organized program that youth or adult learners voluntary can participate in outside of the traditional school day. Some programs are run by a primary or secondary school, while others are run by externally funded non-profit or commercial organizations. After-school youth programs can occur inside a school building or elsewhere in the community, for instance at a community center, church, library, or park. After-school activities are a cornerstone of concerted cultivation, which is a style of parenting that emphasizes children gaining leadership experience and social skills through participating in organized activities. Such children are believed by proponents to be more successful in later life, while others consider too many activities to indicate overparenting.

While some research has shown that structured after-school programs can lead to better test scores, improved homework completion, and higher grades, further research has questioned the effectiveness of after-school programs at improving youth outcomes such as externalizing behavior and school attendance. Additionally, certain activities or programs have made strides in closing the achievement gap, or the gap in academic performance between white students and students of color as measured by standardized tests. Though the existence of after-school activities is relatively universal, different countries implement after-school activities differently, causing after-school activities to vary on a global scale.

== History ==
After World War II, the number of single parent families in the United States increased as women began to participate in the labor force. Traditional family roles and structure were tremendously altered as women began to serve as major financial contributors, increasing the average percentage of employed women from 38 percent in 1955 to 78 percent by 2004. Many women worked jobs with long hours with no one available to pick up children from school at the appropriate time. After-school programs, then, had the significant function of serving as a place where children could receive safe adult supervision after school hours, allowing parents to continue working without the worry of their child’s safety or well-being.

During the World War, after-school programs served as a solution to the decline in child labor and offered supervision for families active in the working economy. The end of the war repurposed after-school activities as opportunities for developing children to receive interactive care that promoted child health and well-being that may not have been received at home. As children began to work fewer or no hours after school, they could focus more on education and participating in school, resulting in a "new outlook on childhood" that emphasized the importance of well-rounded care. A large factor contributing to the continuation and expansion of after-school activities involved growing concerns that children without this source of extra care were at an increased risk of developing social and academic problems because they would utilize learned behaviors of rejecting opportunities before they could be rejected themselves.

== Case countries ==
=== United Kingdom ===
After-school activities in Britain are typically organised commercially and paid for by parents. Many children attend several a week, and occasionally even more than one per day. Similar activities also occur at weekends.

There is typically less focus on the managed "enrichment" than in the US, beyond the basic choice of activity; for example football (soccer) is physically active and develops teamwork.

=== United States ===
After school programs are common in the United States. The oldest after school program in the country, the Knickerbocker Greys, was established in 1881 and is located in New York City.

In Texas, a statewide program exists for creating after-school programs: Texas Afterschool Centers on Education, or Texas ACE. Texas ACE is a part of the Texas Education Agency, funded by the U.S. Department of Education's 21st Century Community Learning Centers program, which sponsors afterschool enrichment programs at under-resourced schools in the U.S.

In California, after-school programming at the secondary level is funded primarily with 21st Century High School ASSETS (After School Safety and Enrichment for Teens) program grants. These grants stipulate programs must include academic, enrichment, and health and nutrition components. The after-school programs at California's elementary schools are predominantly funded with ASES (After-School Education & Safety) Program grants mandated when voters statewide approved California's Proposition 49 (2002). These grants provide for much of what the ASSETS grants provide at the secondary level, though there is an added family literacy component. Throughout Southern California, non-profit providers work in partnership with school districts to provide after-school programs for k-12 students. Typically school districts apply for the grants to fund the local after-school programs. Then districts either elect to manage those program internally or outsource management to a Community-based organization (CBO), Non-governmental organization (NGO) or other local non-profit provider. Beyond the Bell is a district run and managed after-school program offered to students in the Los Angeles Unified School District (LAUSD).

THINK Together, California's largest non-profit provider, contracts with approximately 20 Southern California school district partners to run and manage academically oriented after-school programs at approximately 200 school sites located across Los Angeles, Orange, Riverside and San Bernardino Counties.

== Benefits of after-school activities ==
=== Positive use of time ===
Some working parents wish for their children to be more supervised during after-school hours, which Mahoney, Larson, and Eccles's 2005 study discovered to be a leading reason for student enrollment in structured after-school programs. Likewise, in a 2010 article, scholars Wu and Van Egeren found that some parents enroll their students in after-school programs in order to give them a supervised, safe place to spend time. Many after-school activities take place in the afternoons of school days, on the weekends, or during the summer, thereby helping working parents with childcare. While some after-school programs serve as a day-care facility for young children, other programs specifically target adolescents in middle and high schools—providing opportunities for children of all ages.

Some proponents of these programs argue that if left unsupervised, children and adolescents may fall into undesirable activities such as sexual promiscuity, substance abuse, or gang-affiliated activity. Since adolescents are old enough to be left unsupervised, they have a higher risk of engaging in criminal behavior than young children do, which may increase the perceived need for constructive after-school programs, as Cook, Godfredson, and Na argue in their 2010 article in the journal Crime and Justice. In the United States, interest in utilizing after-school programs for delinquency-prevention increased dramatically after research found that juvenile arrest rates peak between 2 p.m. and 6 p.m. on school days. By keeping students involved in school related activities, it lessens the chance for them to get involved in criminal activity or abuse drugs and alcohol. Involvement with after-school programs has led to students obtaining a more negative view on drugs. A study of positive outcomes from after-school program involvement shows that there are lower uses of drugs such as "alcohol, marijuana, and other drug use" (Kraemer, et al. 2007) after being involved with an after-school program.

=== Academic growth ===
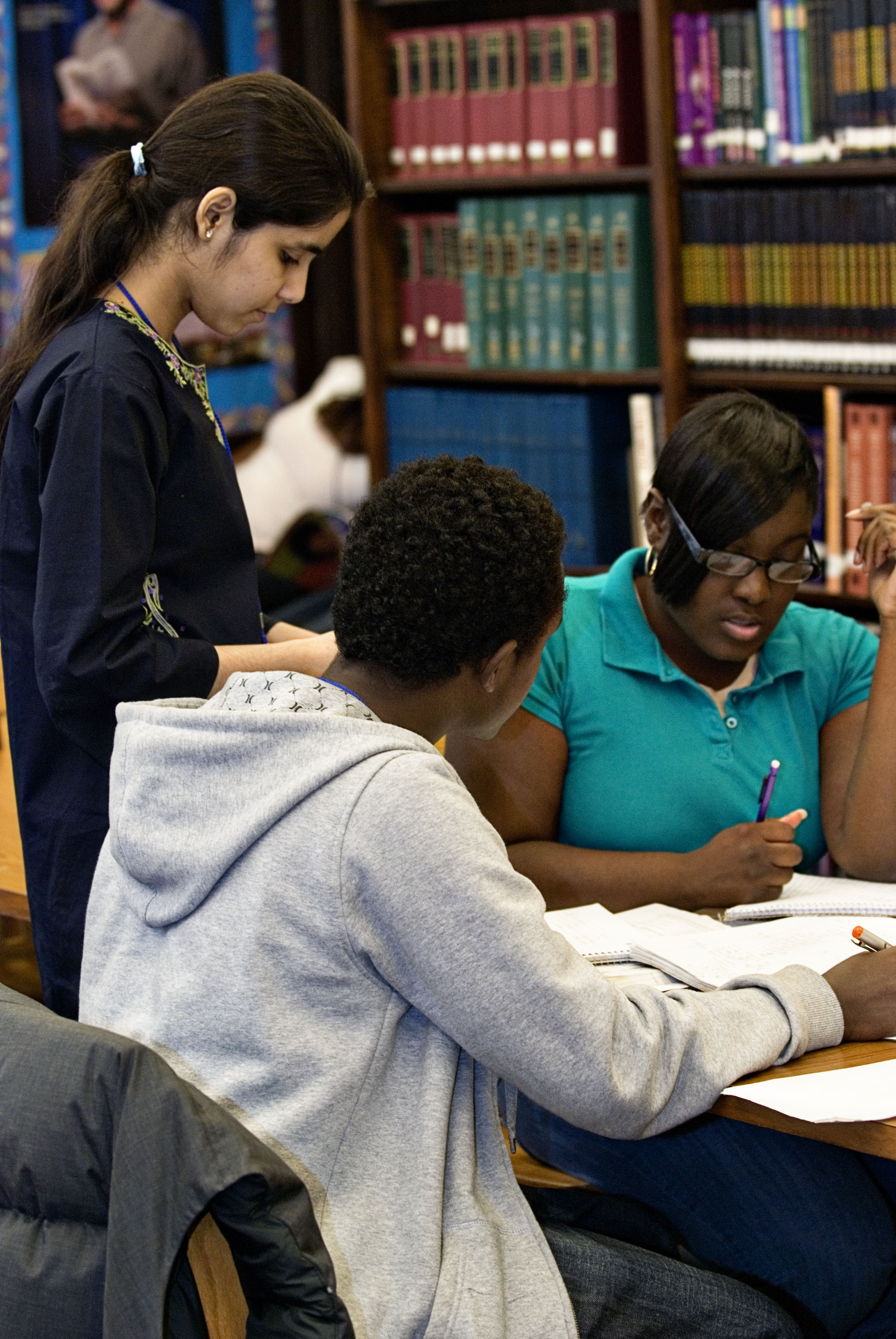
Students participating in an after-school program through Columbia College Chicago at Sullivan High School in Chicago, Illinois in May 2012.

Studies show that afterschool programs are beneficial for both children and adolescents. A 1994 long-term study by Posner and Vandell found that children in structured, academic afterschool programs had increased academic achievement when compared to their peers. Researchers chose a pool of children who had taken part in some sort of after-school program and another pool of children who did not take part in a formal after-school program as a control group. They gave assessments to the children, their parents, and their teachers in order to determine the children's levels of academic achievement, and the results showed that students who had taken part in a structured after-school program were more likely to have better grades and to perform higher in math and reading tests than those who had not taken part in an after-school program.

Similarly, a 2010 study by Durlak, Weissberg, and Pachan showed that both children and adolescents experienced significant academic gains by taking part in afterschool programs.

Several other studies (e.g., Morrison, Storino, Robertson, Weissglass, & Dondero, 2000; Tucker et al., 1995) have found that after-school academic tutoring or homework assistance may not result in an improvement in academic performance, but, rather, prevent a decline in performance that is evidenced by many at-risk youth. Morrison et al. (2000) studied 350 at-risk students, half of whom participated in an after-school program that provided homework assistance, tutoring, and cultural enrichment activities. They found after 1 year that students in the program maintained their initial levels of school bonding and teacher ratings of student behavior, while a matched cohort of students who did not participate in the program showed decreases on these measures over the same period of time.

Tucker et al. (1995) evaluated an afterschool tutoring program serving low-income African American students. After 2 years, participants did not show significant increases in grades, but students who were not in the program showed a significant grade decrease. Together, these studies indicate that after-school academic support may play a protective role by helping to prevent a loss of school engagement even if it doesn't result in higher levels of functioning.

Minority, low income, urban settings, "at-risk", and other negative connotations labeling youth's hinder academic achievements. Effective after-school programs can try to bridge the gap between education achievement and the negatively-labeled student.

In an article written by Barton J.Hirsh, he highlights studies that show children who participate in after-school programs show improvements in both their academic performance and personality development. Additionally, they learn problem solving skills and practice their artistic abilities.

=== Behavioral growth ===
There's mixed evidence as to whether afterschool programs positively impact youth behavioral outcomes. The Posner and Vandell study showed that students who had taken part in an after-school program also exhibited more emotional stability and signs of social adjustment than their counterparts. In particular, students in an after-school activity behaved better and adjusted more smoothly when transitioning to new grades or new schools, most notably in the transition from middle to high school. Other studies provided quantitative data in support of these behavioral benefits by showing that students who participate in an after-school program on average have less disciplinary citations, are suspended less, and are expelled less than their peers who do not participate in any activity. On the other hand, a study of after-school programs in Maryland found participants to engage in more rebellious behavior than non-participants.

=== Closing the achievement gap ===
After-school activities have had proven impacts on decreasing the gap in academic achievement between white students and students of color in the United States. In her 2005 study of efforts to address the racial achievement gap in urban areas, psychologist Julie Bryan noted that after-school activities can strongly benefit a student's socio-emotional health and academic performance. The students that she worked with identified extracurricular activities, after-school opportunities for academic aid, and summer enrichment programs as important contributions to their academic success and personal growth.

One aspect of this success is that after-school activities give students the opportunity to deepen relationships with adult mentors, such as sports coaches, teachers, and community leaders. Research shows that having caring and supportive adult presences in the lives of students greatly increases their sense of self-worth, academic achievement, and capabilities for resiliency in the face of adverse circumstances like poverty and abuse. A 2000 study by Gutman and Migley connects the benefits of students having close relationships with caring adults with a decrease in the achievement gap.

=== Summer learning loss ===
After-school activities can play a role in combatting summer learning loss, which refers to the amount of academic skills that students lose during the summer holidays due to a lack of exposure to academic material. According to a series of 39 meta-analyses collected by Harris Cooper in a study on elementary and early childhood education, students' test scores drop significantly from the last day of school in the spring to the first day in the fall; on average, the summer break sets students back over a month. For primary and secondary school students, reading comprehension, in particular, is highly affected by summer learning loss. If students are able to participate in academic activities during the summer months, they are less likely to be at risk for summer learning loss.

Currently, students from higher socioeconomic backgrounds are more likely to have access to and participate in academic activities during the summer months, which gives them an advantage in academic achievement during the school year when compared to their peers with lower socioeconomic statuses.

== Criticisms of after-school activities ==
=== Rigid structure ===
One criticism of after-school activities is that they provide too much rigidity within a child's life. Advocates of slow parenting believe that children should be allowed to develop their own ideas. Getting bored is a step towards having an idea for something else to do, and having little or no adult interference allows children to express their own creativity. Proponents of this theory argue that structured after-school programs have the potential to take away avenues for such creativity and self-expression amongst children. Similarly, the Taoist concept of wu wei, literally translated as "non-action," supports spontaneity in daily life. Thus, while there may be some children that benefit from being supervised and pushed towards didactic goals through organized after-school activities, others might end up achieving more on their own, or with minimal supervision.

=== Indicative of overparenting ===
Another criticism of after-school activities is that participating in them has the potential to lead to increased stress and anxiety amongst students. Children participating in many organized after-school activities is one common symptom of overparenting. In overparenting, which is more common among middle or upper-class families, parents tend to heavily monitor their child's schedule for the sake of protecting their child or improving their social skills, academic development, and/or future prospects. This has the potential to lead to lasting psychological issues amongst children, such as poorly developed independence and coping skills, low self-esteem, and stress- and anxiety-related disorders.

In her study The Price of Privilege, psychologist Madeline Levine examined the psychological effects of overparenting on socioeconomically privileged children, including the impact of participating in after-school activities. She found that children of wealthy families were more likely to suffer psychological disorders such as anxiety and depression. By spending so much time in organized after-school activities that their parents signed them up for, the children that Levine worked with failed to adequately develop self-management, which is a powerful precursor to both psychological inner strength and academic achievement.

== After-school activities ==
=== Arts & Performance ===
- After school sports
- Dance squads / Ballet training
- Drama club
- Esports
- Film club
- Marching band
- Orchestra
- Sewing circle
- Show choir

=== STEM & Academic ===
- 3D printing / CNC and design club
- Code Club
- CoderDojo
- Computational mathematics club
- Hack Club
- Robotics club / FIRST Robotics Competition
- Users' group / Computer club – List of users' groups

=== Community & Service ===
- Comedy club and Improv club
- Garden club
- Habitat for Humanity (student chapters)
- Interact Club for Rotary International
- Junior Reserve Officers' Training Corps (JROTC) and Civil Air Patrol
- Key Club
- Student publication clubs - list of student newspapers
- UNICEF club

=== Leadership & Social ===
- Jewish Student Union
- Junior Statesmen of America
- Language exchange
- Leo clubs
- Model United Nations
- National Speech and Debate Association
- Student council
- Students Against Destructive Decisions (SADD)
- Teen Age Republicans
- Yearbook club
- Youth council
- Young Democrats of America

=== Special Interests / Miscellaneous ===
- Ameteur radio club
- Art club - Anime club, Digital art, 3D animation
- Camera club
- Chess club
- Culinary club
- Literature circle / Book discussion club
- Skill sharing club
- Type Directors Club
- Writing circle / Wikipedian group
- Workout club – CrossFit to Running club

== See also ==
- Extracurricular activity
- Achievement gap
- Summer learning loss
- Concerted cultivation
- Parenting styles
- Slow parenting
- AYSO
- YMCA
- YWCA
- After-School All-Stars
- Boys & Girls Clubs of America
- buildOn
