= Soccer mom =

Term for demographic segment

A soccer mom is typically an American, Canadian, or Australian middle-class, suburban woman who spends a significant amount of her time transporting school-age children to youth sporting events or other activities (whether or not they are soccer-related). It came into widespread use during the 1996 United States presidential election and over time has come to take on an unfavorable connotation.

== History ==
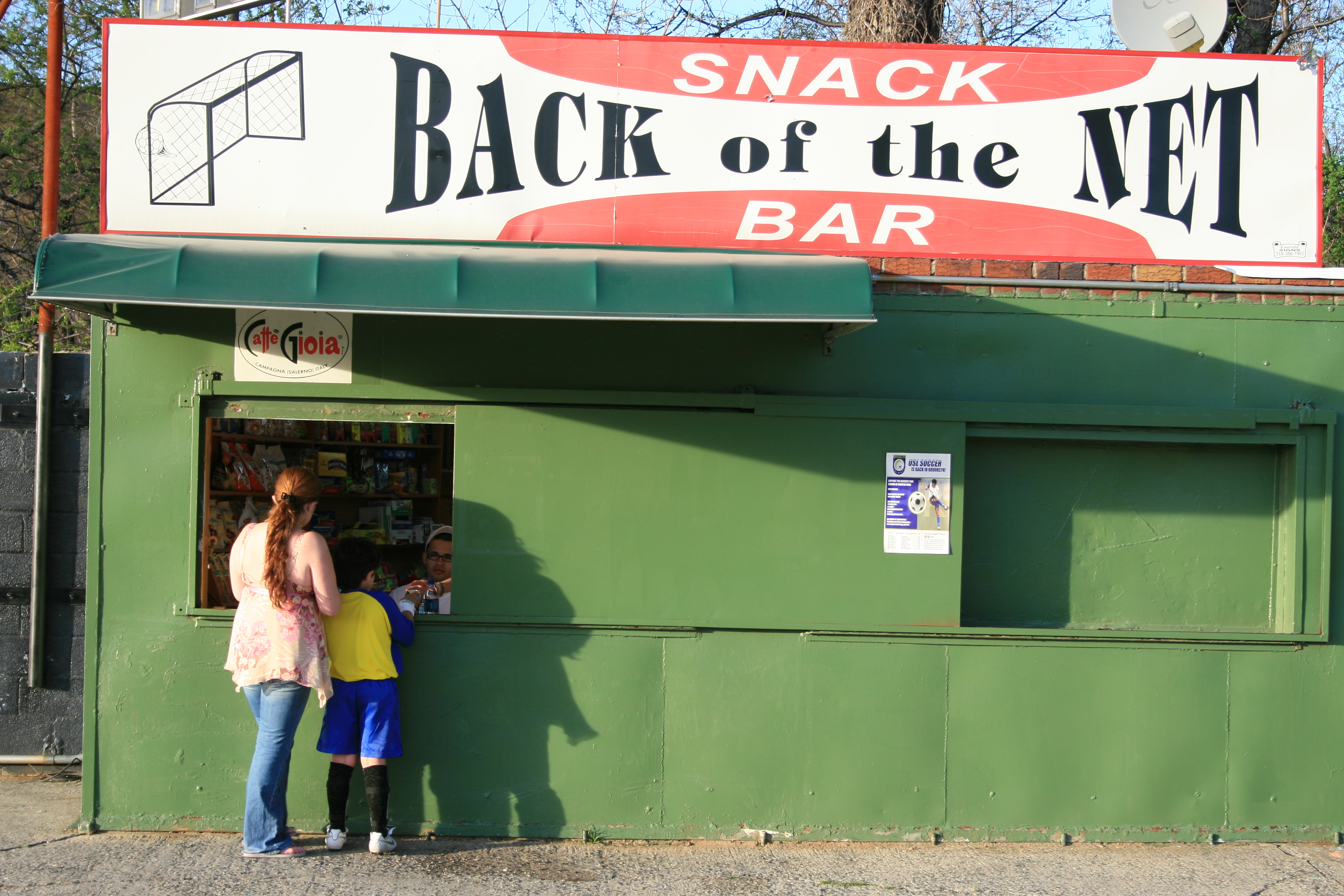
A soccer mom and her child at a refreshment stand at the Metropolitan Oval, a soccer complex in Queens, New York

The phrase "soccer mom" generally refers to a married, American, middle-class woman who lives in the suburbs and has school-age children. She is sometimes portrayed in the media as busy or overburdened and driving a minivan or SUV. She is also described as putting the interests of her family, and most importantly her children, ahead of her own. The phrase derives from the literal, specific description of a mother who transports and watches her children play soccer. It was also used in names of organizations of mothers who raised money to support their children's soccer teams.

The first reference to the term "soccer mom" in the United States national media has been traced to 1982. In that year, the husband of the treasurer of the "Soccer Moms booster club" of Ludlow, Massachusetts, stole $3,150 raised for the benefit of a local soccer league (equivalent to $10,500 in 2025).

Indices of American magazines and newspapers show relatively little usage of the term until 1995, when, during an election for Denver city council, Susan B. Casey ran with the slogan: "A Soccer Mom for City Council." Casey, who held a Ph.D. and managed presidential election campaigns, used the slogan as a way of assuring voters they could trust her to be "just like them," denoting herself as "everyneighbor." The phrase addressed anxiety about women's achievements, and the stereotype that smart, accomplished women were not able to manage professional careers while showing love for their family. Casey won the election with 51 percent of the vote.

The term came into widespread use around the time of the 1996 Republican National Convention. Its first use in a news article about that election appeared in the July 21, 1996, edition of The Washington Post. E. J. Dionne, the article's author, quoted Alex Castellanos (at the time a senior media advisor to Bob Dole) as suggesting that Bill Clinton was targeting a voting demographic whom Castellanos called the "soccer mom". The soccer mom was described in the article as "the overburdened middle income working mother who ferries her kids from soccer practice to scouts to school." The article suggested that the term "soccer mom" was a creation of political consultants. Castellanos was later quoted in The Wall Street Journal as saying: "She's the key swing consumer in the marketplace, and the key swing voter who will decide the election."

Media interest in soccer moms picked up as the election approached. The number of articles on soccer moms in major newspapers increased from a combined total of 12 for the months of August and September to a total of 198 for October and November. The intense media focus stemmed in large part from the media's belief that soccer moms had become the most sought-after group of swing voters in the 1996 elections. In the end, suburban women favored Clinton by 53 to 39 percent, while suburban men voted for Dole.

During the election, the soccer mom's most frequently mentioned attribute cited in major newspaper articles was that she was a mother or a woman who had children. The soccer mom's next most frequently mentioned characteristics were that "she lives in the suburbs (41.2% of the articles); is a swing voter (30.8%); is busy, harried, stressed out, or overburdened (28.4%); works outside the home (24.6%); drives a minivan (usually a Volvo) station wagon or sport utility vehicle (20.9%); is middle-class (17.1%); is married (13.7%); and is white (13.3%)."

Soccer moms received so much attention during the election that the American Dialect Society voted soccer mom Word of the Year for 1996. Columnist Ellen Goodman of The Boston Globe called 1996 "the Year of the Soccer Mom." The Associated Press named soccer moms, along with the Macarena, Bob Dole, and "Rules Girls" as four phenomena that would be forever associated with the year 1996.

== Criticism ==
Soccer moms have been accused of forcing their children to participate in too many after-school activities, overparenting them in concerted cultivation rather than letting them enjoy their childhood.

In 2003, the car manufacturer Nissan, who had for several years courted the "soccer-mom" image, started marketing their Quest minivan as "stylish, sexy and desirable".

== Related terms ==
=== Security moms ===
During the 2004 presidential campaign, pundits started talking about the security mom, which was deemed to be a powerful voting bloc. Security moms were supposed to be concerned primarily with issues such as the war in Iraq, domestic terrorism, and the security of their children.

There is evidence, however, that security moms did not exist in great enough numbers to influence the 2004 election outcome. Democratic women tended to be most interested in healthcare, which Democratic front runner John Kerry abandoned as a talking point, and may explain Kerry's difficulty in garnering their support.

=== Hockey mom ===
Hockey mom is a term widely used in Canada and northern United States (including Alaska), in which mothers often take their children to ice hockey rinks. The first article in The New York Times that used "hockey mom" as a demographic term was a 1999 review of the Chevrolet Silverado, a full-size pickup truck. In the article, the truck is described as a "smooth and gutsy" vehicle that "ought to please everyone from hockey mom to cattle hauler".

Former Alaska governor Sarah Palin, the US Republican vice-presidential candidate in 2008, described herself as a "hockey mom" as far back as her 2006 gubernatorial race. In her speech at the 2008 Republican National Convention and in stump speeches following the convention, she joked that the only difference between a hockey mom and a pit bull was lipstick, suggesting that hockey moms are tough. "Hockey partisans" on the Internet claim that hockey moms are "a bit more intense than their soccer counterparts, both in terms of the commitments they make to the sport and the intensity with which they cheer their kids."

== See also ==
- After-school activity
- Angry white man
- Concerted cultivation
- Helicopter parent
- Karen (slang)
- Kyoiku mama
- Mama grizzly
- NASCAR dad
- Stage mother
- Tiger mom
- Will it play in Peoria?
- Worcester woman
