= Directed attention fatigue =

Neuro-psychological phenomenon

Directed attention fatigue (DAF) is a neuropsychological phenomenon that results from overuse of the brain's inhibitory attention mechanisms, which handle incoming distractions while maintaining focus on a specific task. The greatest threat to a given focus of attention is competition from other stimuli that can cause a shift in focus. This is because one maintains focus on a particular thought by inhibiting all potential distractions and not by strengthening that central mental activity. Directed attention fatigue occurs when a particular part of the brain's global inhibitory system is overworked due to the suppression of increasing numbers of stimuli. This temporary condition is not a clinical illness or a personality disorder. It is rather a temporary fatigue of the inhibitory mechanisms in the brain. According to inhibition theory, it is natural for one to alternate between periods of attention and distraction. Although one's efforts may involve very different tasks, each incoming stimulus calls upon the same directed attention mechanism.

== Signs and symptoms ==
Extreme levels of mental fatigue lead to an inability to perform regular tasks and irritability. Studies that require participants to carry out attention-demanding tasks under conditions of high distraction reveal how unpleasant a mentally fatigued person can be. After exposure to such an experience, individuals are less likely to help someone in need. They are also more aggressive, less tolerant, and less sensitive to socially important cues. Fatigue that is experienced by participants of these kinds of studies is induced by attention-intensive tasks, and the observed effects of such fatigue are correlated with decline in inhibitory control. Signs of Directed Attention Fatigue include temporarily feeling unusually distractible, impatient, forgetful, or cranky when there is no associated illness. In more severe forms, it can lead to bad judgment, apathy, or accidents, and can contribute to increased stress levels.

There are 6 major areas of mental processing that are affected during onset of DAF, which are as follows:

1. Input – One may experience misperception and miss social cues.
2. Thinking – One may experience feelings of restlessness, confusion, forgetfulness and/or decreased metacognition.
3. Behavior – One may experience feelings of impulsiveness and recklessness, and may find that they have a diminished level of threshold between thoughts and actions. One may also act out-of-character.
4. Executive Functioning – One may experience an inability to plan and make appropriate decisions and may experience impaired judgment ability.
5. Emotions – One may experience being short-tempered and feelings of unpleasantness.
6. Social Interactions – One may experience heightened irritability and increased frequency of antisocial feelings.

Overlap of symptoms from the six above categories is highly indicative of Directed Attention Fatigue.

=== Link to ADHD ===
Some symptoms of attention deficit hyperactivity disorder (ADHD) closely mirror the symptoms of directed attention fatigue. Like directed attention fatigue, ADHD involves the prefrontal cortex. Specifically, the right prefrontal cortex is less active among children with ADHD. Experimentation has shown that the severity of ADHD symptoms can be correlated to the degree of asymmetry between blood flow in the left and right prefrontal cortex. It is possible that DAF and ADHD involve disruption of the same underlying mechanism, and recent clinical evidence has found that the same treatments used for directed attention fatigue may reduce the symptoms of ADHD in children. Unlike ADHD, DAF is a temporary condition rather than a clinical disorder.

== Cause ==
The onset of directed attention fatigue can be triggered by a number of activities involving the use of the brain's inhibitory system. Activities that engage this system include multitasking, working in an environment with disruptive background noise, a lack of sleep, and rapidly changing focus during a prolonged period of attention. DAF can also be brought about by performing concentration-intensive tasks such as puzzle-solving or learning unfamiliar ideas. External factors such as stress resulting from emergencies, exams or work deadlines can also induce DAF. Any illness or injury to the brain that interrupts the brain circuits involved in maintaining attention and inhibiting external stimuli (e.g., the posterior parietal cortex) may also contribute to the development of directed attention fatigue.

== Anatomy ==
Directed attention, or voluntary attention, requires a great deal of concentration and focus, and is employed in tasks such as problem solving. This type of attention employs the inhibitory mechanisms of the brain, which help block incoming stimuli that are unrelated to the task at hand. Several parts of the brain are involved in maintaining directed attention, primarily those located in the frontal lobe and the parietal lobe of the brain. Specifically, the mechanism of directed attention employs the prefrontal cortex (PFC), the anterior cingulate cortex (ACC) and the brain stem's basal ganglia. Some fMRI studies have shown that directed attention involves changes in the anterior cingulate cortex and the lateral prefrontal cortex, perhaps as a consequence of increased connectivity between these two areas. Evidence also suggests that the right inferior frontal cortex (IFC) plays a specialized role in response inhibition. It seems that this region plays a key role in the integration of bottom-up response-related information and facilitates goal-directed behavior. While these areas of the brain are known to be involved in DAF, their specific molecular mechanisms in the perpetuation of DAF symptoms are not yet known.

== Diagnosis ==
=== Differential diagnosis ===
The concept of stress is used in many situations that would be described as mental fatigue, but the two concepts are distinctly different. Stress involves preparation for an anticipated event that has been evaluated as being threatening or harmful. Though mental fatigue may well result from stressful circumstances, it also arises out of hard work on a project one enjoys. In such cases, there is no anticipation of threat or harm present but still the result is fatigue. Characteristic of mental fatigue is difficulty focusing. For a mentally fatigued person, paying attention to something uninteresting is burdensome, even though focusing on something of great interest poses no particular challenge. Hence, there are two types of attention, distinguished in terms of the effort involved in their use and their changes in attentional shift:

1. Involuntary attention refers to attention that requires no effort at all, as when something exciting or interesting happens.
2. Voluntary attention, or directed attention, refers to attention that requires a great deal of effort, as when something is monotonous or boring.

== Treatment ==
There are measures that can be taken in order to reduce the impact of DAF. These include reducing the number of distractions present in one's external environment, trying to clear one's mind of any internal distractions and taking short breaks during prolonged periods of focus. Directed attention fatigue can be reduced by getting a sufficient amount of sleep each night, because inhibitory attention chemicals are replenished during sleep.

An aesthetic environment may also serve a restorative function in fostering recovery from mental fatigue. Research has shown that restorative experiences, such as clearing one's head and reflecting on one's life and priorities, may help combat Directed Attention Fatigue. As investigated by attention restoration theory, natural environments, such as forests, mountain landscapes or beaches, appear to be particularly effective for restoring attention, perhaps because they contain a vast amount of diverse, relatively weak stimuli, thus inciting the mind to wander freely while relaxing its strict focus.

== Research ==
Ongoing research is examining ways in which the incidence of DAF can be decreased, and suggests that exposure to the natural environment may aid in the reduction of DAF symptoms. Leading contributors include Rachel and Stephen Kaplan, environmental psychologists at the University of Michigan. Rachel and Stephen Kaplan were among the first to discover that extended periods of focused attention can lead to directed attention fatigue. Their research suggests that directed attention fatigue can be alleviated with exposure to nature. Together, the Kaplans devised the attention restoration theory (ART), which states that a person is better able to maintain focused directed attention after spending time in the natural environment. Core to the Kaplan's theory is their notion of "soft fascination".

Similarly, it has been discovered that even brief amounts of time spent on a busy metropolitan street can affect one's ability to maintain focus on a given task. Experimental findings suggest that spending time in a natural environment or even looking at pictures of nature can improve maintenance of directed attention.

The Landscape and Human Health Laboratory (LHHL) has completed studies examining the complex relationship between people and their environment. Researchers here discovered the correlation between Directed Attention Fatigue, irritability and aggression. Their findings suggest that people deprived of the restorative effects of nature display more aggressive qualities. Results also demonstrate that communities with several trees and other natural areas tend to be stronger, safer and house residents with a higher attention level. More recent experimentation done at the LHHL suggests that children possessing attention deficits increase their attention level after walking outdoors.

A 2022 review by Sun et al. addressed whether directed attention fatigue is lessened after exposure to nature in mentally fatigued athletes. Some of the reviewed studies used walks in nature, recorded video scenes of nature, pictures of nature scenes, or even nature sounds such as bird songs. This review also compared alternative theories to attention restoration theory, including the strength model of self-regulation (SMSR), the attention-resource model, and the stress recovery theory.

A number of studies have been performed that specifically focus on directed attention fatigue experienced by cancer patients. Such studies suggests that the DAF experienced by cancer patients following surgery improves significantly through outdoor restorative activities for 20 minutes per day.

== See also ==
- Attention
- Attention span
- Environmental psychology
- Ego depletion
- Human multitasking
