= JCPenney Afterschool Fund =

American non-profit organization

JCPenney established JCPenney Afterschool, a non-profit, 501(c)(3) organization dedicated to ensuring that every child in need has access to an afterschool program in their community. As an advocate for the afterschool issue, JCPenney works to increase opportunities offered by afterschool programs. Through its legacy of supporting youth and charitable organizations such as the Boys & Girls Clubs of America, YMCA of the USA, National 4-H Conference, United Way and FIRST, JCPenney formalized its commitment to the afterschool issue by making it the company’s signature cause in 1999.

Since its inception, more than $80 million has been distributed to afterschool programs in every JCPenney community.

== About the afterschool issue ==
A study shows that one out of every four children in America are on their own between the hours of 3 p.m. and 6 p.m. Despite growing participation in afterschool programs (8.4 million children), the availability of quality afterschool programs is not keeping pace with the rising needs of 15 million children who have no place to go after school. JCPenney works with afterschool organizations to increase the accessibility and affordability of afterschool programs across the country.

== Contributions and fundraising ==
Round-up for JCPenney Afterschool

In 2007, JCPenney began fundraising events throughout the year to allow the community to support an afterschool program. During each event, customers are invited to round-up their JCPenney purchases to the nearest whole dollar and donate the difference to JCPenney Afterschool. In 2009, customer contributions resulted in an annual total of $4.7 million. All proceeds raised directly benefitted a local afterschool program in over 1,100 communities where JCPenney has a store.

Sponsorship of the Rascal Flatts Unstoppable Tour

JCPenney was the official sponsor of the Rascal Flatts Unstoppable tour. The band promoted JCPenney's brand "American Living," a concept by Polo Ralph Lauren's Global Concept Group. In conjunction with the tour, Rascal Flatts wrote a bonus track for their new CD to debut April 7, 2009, entitled "American Living." $1 of each CD sold was donated to JCPenney Afterschool.
