= Cedarsong Nature School =

Location
- 47.4472°N 122.4597°W

Information
- Established: 2006; 20 years ago
- Founders: Erin K. Kenny; Robin Rogers
- Age: 2 to 6

Cedarsong Nature School is an early education nature immersion program based on the German forest kindergarten model. The students are children ages 2–6 and the curriculum is based on interaction with the environment and establishing a connection to the natural world through play. Founded in 2006 by naturalists and childhood educators Erin K. Kenny and Robin Rogers, Cedarsong was the first school in the United States to open a forest kindergarten, and as of February 2015 was the only school in the United States offering Forest Kindergarten Teacher Training and Certification. The school is located on a five-acre campus on Vashon Island, Washington and serves the Greater Seattle area.
