= Forest school (learning style) =

Outdoor approach to education

Forest school is an outdoor education delivery model in which students visit natural spaces to learn personal, social and technical skills. It has been defined as "an inspirational process that offers children, young people and adults regular opportunities to achieve and develop confidence through hands-on learning in a woodland environment." Forest school is both a pedagogy and a physical entity, with the use often being interchanged. The plural "schools" is often used when referring to a number of groups or sessions.

Forest school uses the woods and forests as a means to build independence and self-esteem in children and young adults. Topics are cross-curriculum (broad in subject) including the natural environment, for example the role of trees in society, the complex ecosystem supported by a wilderness, and recognition of specific plants and animals. However, the personal skills are considered highly valuable, such as teamwork and problem solving. The woodland environment may be used to learn about more abstract concepts such as mathematics and communication. Forest school provision is also called nature schools.

== Activities and scope ==
In the UK Model, schedules within forest schools vary, but one approach is to take students to woodlands once a week, with an initial six-week observation and assessment period, where a baseline is produced for each child in terms of areas of their holistic development, with particular emphasis on their social and emotional aspects of learning (SEAL). Once the baseline assessment has been produced the Forest School Leader/Practitioner will then continue with the long-term programme over the course of the learning period in order to support the child in their development and learning. The practitioner will provide opportunities for each child to develop in areas that have been identified as requiring interventions or support of any kind The duration and frequency of visits influences the degree of outcome; more time spent in forest school brings greater benefits. Visits should ideally continue throughout the year, allowing children to experience all weathers and the changing seasons.

Forest schools are for all students, of any age, often "led by the learner's interests" (learner-initiated learning) by comparison to other outdoor education which "starts with an issue agenda or problem for the learner to investigate". The main goals of forest school in primary age children includes encouraging curiosity and exploration with all of the senses, empowering children in the natural environment, and encouraging spatial awareness and motor development. Forest schools usually provide a higher adult to child ratio than some learning styles, in order to ensure children are supported sufficiently in a higher risk environment.

Beyond primary-school-age children, forest school is frequently used to further develop social skills and explore creative learning and focuses on developing firm foundations for continued personal and education development. In particular it has been used as an alternative curriculum provision to support continued mainstream education involvement, or as a temporary/transitional approach back into school.

Consistent with attention restoration theory, children taking part in forest school have been described as more relaxed. Relationships between the children and each other, with adults, and with the environment, are important. Incorporating simple meditation practices, such as sit spots, helps children develop mindfulness in the natural setting.

Multiple studies have reported on the restorative effects of nature encounters on children, specifically through stress reduction and attention span capacity. The attention restoration theory (ART) theorizes that contact with natural environments can restore the attention capacity of people who have become mentally fatigued. A study published in 2015 tested this theory by comparing the cognitive function of children after a walk through nature to that of children who walked through an urban environment. The children performed significantly higher on the attention task after the nature walk than they did after the urban walk, suggesting that spending time in natural environments has restorative effects on attention that man-made environments do not. A 2017 study looked into the effects of outdoor teaching in a forest vs traditional classroom teaching on the diurnal cortisol rhythm of children. They found that the cortisol levels of students attending the outdoor classes declined throughout the course of the day, which is the healthy diurnal cortisol rhythm for children, but the children taught in traditional classrooms did not show this decrease in cortisol. This suggests that outdoor education classes lead to healthy stress levels in children, while traditional indoor classes do not.

Forest school is part of the broader area of outdoor education. Outside the school curriculum, this extends to summer holiday camps, Scouting, Outward Bound projects and many other activities. Before children reach school age, forest kindergartens provide a similar service.

Forest school is currently taking place in Australia, Canada, New Zealand, USA, Malaysia, Switzerland, Spain, Israel, Ireland, Germany and United Kingdom.

== Supporting exceptional children ==
The combination of freedom and responsibility has been particularly beneficial to children who lack confidence or whose behaviour is challenging. With high adult to child ratios, children can safely experience activities that are often prohibited, such as climbing trees or lighting fires. Children have the freedom to explore the area within the forest, this helps the child to learn to manage their own safety and move around comfortably. The programme allows children to grow in confidence and independence and extend their abilities.

Some children do not perform well in classrooms. They are encouraged to develop their curiosity and motivation to learn. They may come from a non-academic family background, have a short attention span, or not be comfortable with the organisation of a teacher standing in front of a group of pupils. According to one source, boys generally prefer to be outside and learn better in this way.

In a major study in the US, students with behavioural problems in "Environment as an Integrating Context for Learning" (EIC) programmes caused fewer discipline problems than their traditionally educated peers. Similarly, forest schools have been found to help children with additional support needs, including Attention-deficit hyperactivity disorder and autistic children.

== History ==
=== Sweden and Denmark ===
In the 1950s the idea was created in Denmark and shortly thereafter in Sweden. In Denmark it became an embedded part of the curriculum for pre-school children (under seven years) stemming from their småbørnspædagogik, or 'Early childhood education'. Children attending Forest kindergartens were in most cases arriving at school with strong social skills, the ability to work in groups effectively, high self-esteem, and confidence in their own capabilities.

In 1957, a Swedish man, Gösta Frohm, created the "Skogsmulle" concept to promote learning about nature, water, mountains and pollution. With an increasing focus on measurable outcomes, forest schools have gained acceptance as an educational method in their own right. In Denmark, nature schools as well as forest kindergartens are popular with both school teachers and children.

The biophilia hypothesis argues that a love of nature is instinctive. The term nature deficit disorder, coined by Richard Louv in his 2005 book Last Child in the Woods, recognises the erosion of this by the urbanisation of human society. Attention restoration theory and related psychological work has proven health benefits in reduced stress, improved concentration and improved medical outcomes from surgery. Scandinavian countries, rich in woodland, have maintained the human link more closely. Forest schools practice is based on up-to date pedagogy and andragogy.

=== United Kingdom ===
This ethos was introduced to the UK during the 1990s from Denmark. The growth of forest school has been unprecedented throughout the UK developing into a separate and distinct model called the UK Model. Bridgwater College in Somerset was the pioneer of the forest school concept in the UK in 1994 after a group of nursery nurses travelled to Denmark to observe the Danish/Nordic Model of Forest Kindergartens for a few days.

Various government and NGO agencies propose the use of woodland as part of the school educational curriculum; for example the Forest Education Initiative and the Forestry Commission. By 2006, there were approximately 140 forest schools in Britain.

The governmental agencies have in some cases been set targets for the use of their resources for education or health benefits, or are focused on the educational outcomes and see forestry as a step towards them.

Many businesses and non-profit organizations facilitate forest school long term programmes. In Wales, training and strategic oversight is provided by Forest Schools Wales and government agencies such as the Forestry Commission who have supported research and the development of practical experience for forest school practitioners. In England, support has been provided by the Forest Education Network (which has replaced the Forest Education Initiative) to those initiating forest school provision. Such provision is provided within schools using their own trained staff or by external independent forest school providers.

Many organisations now offer training courses designed for the UK to enable practitioners to deliver forest school in their own settings and ensure children and teachers work within rich natural experiences. The OCN Level 3 training course is most widely recognised within the UK.

Developing from the Institute of Outdoor Learning's (IOL) Forest School Special Interest Group, in June 2012 The Forest School Association was established as an independent UK body. In Northern Ireland, the Northern Ireland Forest School's Association runs after school Nature Ranger clubs, teacher training and other forest school activities.

=== Canada ===
Inspired by international developments, the first Canadian forest school was created by Marlene Power in 2007. It was named Carp Ridge Preschool and was located near Ottawa. In 2012, Power founded and became the executive director of Forest School Canada, an educational initiative of the Child and Nature Alliance of Canada. Forest School Canada is focused on being a "network for support, education, and accreditation for concepts associated with the FS movement in Canada."

The movement has spread into Canada's provinces and is primary associated with private schools. However, there is emerging support from public schools such as the Nature Kindergarten pilot which is a partnership between the Sooke District School Board and the University of Victoria's Centre for Early Childhood Research and Policy, Royal Roads University, and Camosun College's Early Learning and Care Program.

== Terminology ==
Attempts have been made to copyright and trademark generic terms related to forest school. There is no known protection of the term "forest school" or "forest schools".

== See also ==
- Forest kindergarten
- Outdoor education
- Sudbury Schools – another school framework (PreK–12) providing access to unlimited time outdoors
