= Nurturant parent model =

Type of Parenting styles

The nurturant parent model is a parenting style, built upon an underlying value system, that goes in contrast with the strict father model. Each system reflects a contrasting value system in parenthood, i.e. conservative parenting and liberal parenting.

The "nurturant parent" is one of the various parenting styles in practice in the world. A nurturing parent gives their children both "roots in the ground" and "wings to fly". The parent accomplishes this by conveying, role-modeling and enforcing boundaries which encourage the child to explore their personal freedom (trying their new wings) while practicing self-discipline as well. The nurturant parent model has a healthy respect for children's inherent intelligence. Thus children are allowed to explore their environment under a careful watch by their parents, who are responsible for protecting the child from serious mistakes, by offering guidance. A child will be picked up if the child cries because the parent wants the child to feel safe and supported. If a child grows up believing their needs are likely to be met, (s)he will grow up confident, ready to face challenges. Meanwhile the nurturant parent also encourages their children to have their roots deeply implanted in stable grounds. This is done by making the child practice appropriate amount of self-discipline and self-connection. They may be asked to do age-appropriate house chores, limit money they spend, take part in discussions of "feelings" and "thoughts" and practice setting healthy boundaries with strangers, friends and adults in general.

Other ideas:

- Discipline is much more than strict, unquestioning obedience
- Mutual respect and compassion are also rights
- Mutual respect and compassion are best taught by example
- The outside world is no more inherently hostile than it is inherently friendly
- The world commands respect

== Research ==
This model is based on a study conducted by the Boston College Graduate Program in Human Development where researchers were investigating the parenting style preferred by parents of extraordinarily creative children. Most parenting books recommend the authoritative style. The researchers discovered another parenting style which they called "the nurturing parent" that focuses on responsibility, empathy, and creativity. The basic approach these parents used was to:

- Trust in their children's fairness and good judgment
- Respect their children's autonomy, thoughts and feelings
- Support their children's interests and goals
- Enjoy their children's company
- Protect their children from doing injury to self or others, not by establishing rules but by communicating values and discussing their children's behavior back with them
- Modeling the self-control, sensitivity and values they believe their children will need

== Further mentions ==
In his unfinished book, Caring Parents: a Guide to Successful Parenting, clinical social worker Herbert Jay Rosenfield encourages use of the acronym "RECEPEE", for "Reasonable Expectations, Clearly Expressed, Performed Everyday and by Example". "The factors that children need to develop good self-esteem … are primarily 'gifts' from us parents!" writes Rosenfield, who offers another acronym "UCARE":

- Uniqueness that is positive, achieved through praise, encouragement, and positive feedback
- Connectiveness to family, to extended family, and to a neighborhood that is safe, healthy and moderate
- Age-appropriate autonomy: responsibilities and privileges that parallel their age and capabilities
- Role Examples: parent models with good self-esteem and behavior, whom they can emulate

Reverend George Englehardt stated succinctly, in 1991, that "parental responsibility is to provide their children with a safe, loving, nurturing environment".

The nurturant parent model is also discussed by George Lakoff in his books, including Moral Politics and Whose Freedom? In these books, the nurturant parent model is contrasted with the strict father model. Lakoff argues that if the metaphor of nation as family and government as parent is used, then progressive politics correspond to the nurturant parent model. For example, progressives want the government to make sure that the citizens are protected and assisted to achieve their potential. This might take the form of tough environmental regulations or healthcare assistance.

The model is also consistent with slow parenting in that children are encouraged to explore the world for themselves. They have to learn to face the risks that nature presents. Although slow parenting might go further and reduce the level of protection offered by parents, it would not advocate withholding it entirely.

== See also ==
- Slow parenting
