= Attention deficit hyperactivity disorder predominantly inattentive =

Neurodevelopmental disorder

- Other names: Attention deficit disorder (ADD) (without hyperactivity) (outdated)
- Specialty: Psychiatry
- Medication: Stimulants (methylphenidate, amphetamine, Lisdexamfetamine); non-stimulants (atomoxetine, viloxazine); alpha-2a agonists (guanfacine XR, clonidine XR)

Attention deficit hyperactivity disorder, predominantly inattentive presentation (ADHD-PI or ADHD-I), is one of the three recognized presentations of attention deficit hyperactivity disorder (ADHD).

Historically, ADHD was not divided into presentations. Between 1987 and 1994, during the publication of the DSM-III-R, the disorder was classified as a single entity without subtypes. In the DSM-5, these subtypes were replaced with "presentations", reflecting that an individual's symptom profile can change over time.

The predominantly inattentive presentation is characterized by symptoms such as difficulty sustaining attention, procrastination, hesitation in task initiation, and frequent forgetfulness. Unlike the hyperactive-impulsive and combined presentations, individuals with ADHD-PI exhibit fewer or no symptoms of hyperactivity and impulsivity. Lethargy and fatigue may be reported, but ADHD-PI is distinct from cognitive disengagement syndrome (CDS), a separate construct characterized by sluggish cognitive tempo.

== Classification ==
ADHD-PI is a presentation of ADHD in which symptoms of inattention predominate, while symptoms of hyperactivity or impulsivity are less prominent or absent. Individuals often exhibit directed attention fatigue and may appear internally distracted rather than outwardly hyperactive.

== Signs and symptoms ==
=== DSM-5 criteria ===
The DSM-5 allows for the diagnosis of the predominantly inattentive presentation of ADHD (ICD-10 code F90.0) if the individual presents with six or more (five for adults) of the following symptoms of inattention for at least six months to a point that is disruptive and inappropriate for their developmental level:

- Often does not give close attention to details or makes careless mistakes in schoolwork, work, or other activities.
- Often has trouble keeping attention on tasks or play activities.
- Often does not seem to listen when spoken to directly.
- Often does not follow instructions and fails to finish schoolwork, chores, or duties in the workplace (not due to oppositional behavior or failure to understand instructions).
- Often has trouble organizing activities.
- Often avoids, dislikes, or doesn't want to do things that take a lot of mental effort for a long period (such as schoolwork or homework).
- Often loses things needed for tasks and activities (e.g. toys, school assignments, pencils, books, or tools).
- Is often easily distracted.
- Is often forgetful in daily activities.

An ADHD diagnosis is contingent upon the symptoms of impairment presenting themselves in two or more settings (e.g., at school or work and at home). There must also be clear evidence of clinically significant impairment in social, academic, or occupational functioning. Lastly, the symptoms must not occur exclusively during the course of schizophrenia or another psychotic disorder, and are not better accounted for by another mental disorder (e.g., mood disorder, anxiety disorder, dissociative disorder, personality disorder).

Life period	Examples of observed symptoms
Children	Failing to pay close attention to details or making careless mistakes when doing schoolwork or other activities
Children	Trouble keeping attention focused during play or tasks
Children	Appearing not to listen when spoken to (often being accused of "daydreaming")
Children	Failing to follow instructions or finish tasks
Children	Avoiding tasks that require a high amount of longer-term mental effort and organization, such as school projects
Children	Frequently losing items required to facilitate tasks or activities, such as school supplies
Children	Excessive distractibility
Children	Forgetfulness
Children	Procrastination, inability to begin an activity, such as completing homework
Adults	Procrastination; delaying or avoiding starting projects that require vigilant mental effort
Adults	Difficulty sustaining concentration in conversations or briefly losing attention on someone speaking
Adults	Hesitation to sustain concentration in planning and organizing for the completion of tasks
Adults	Hesitative responses, doubt, and delayed execution due to inattention remembering information
Adults	Difficulty finishing projects or completing assignments because many tasks are simultaneously on the go
Adults	Forgetting to complete tasks and details after temporarily switching to more stimulating tasks
Adults	Difficulty finding misplaced tools after task switching due to bypassing adequate memory storage
Adults	Sustained information processing is slower than others causing information gaps that inhibit execution
Adults	Problems remembering appointments, obligations, or instructions
Adults	Difficulty learning new projects when concentration deficits cause desire to multitask or daydream
Adults	Distracted from persevering during work; difficulty holding onto a job for a significant amount of time
Adults	Changing plans, to the inconvenience of others, due to forgetting or not fully aware of the bigger scenario
Adults	Maintaining excessive personal items such as storing old items of diminished usefulness
Adults	Compulsive behavior as compensation or coping mechanism for a perseverance deficit
Adults	Difficulty transitioning to new task or activity due to compulsive behavior
Adults	Higher rate of vigilant concentration fatigue after inhibiting many distractions from greater effort required

== Treatment ==
Although ADHD has most often been treated with medication, medications do not cure ADHD. They are used solely to treat its symptoms, which return when the medication is stopped.

==== Organizational Skills Training ====
Organizational skills training is a non-medication treatment that can help children and adolescents with attention-deficit/hyperactivity disorder (ADHD) improve their time management, planning, and ability to organize school materials. Research has shown that this type of training can improve organizational skills and may also lead to smaller improvements in attention and academic performance. These strategies can be used alongside other ADHD treatments to help individuals manage everyday responsibilities.

=== Medication ===
Stimulants are typically formulated into short and long-acting types. These are often referred to as 'instant release' and 'extended release', respectively.

The fast-acting amphetamine mixed salts (Adderall) and its derivatives are often used, with short and long-acting formulations binding to the trace amine associated receptor and triggering the release of dopamine into the synaptic cleft. These medications may have a better cardiovascular disease profile than methylphenidate and potentially better tolerated.

The fast-acting methylphenidate (well known under the trade name Ritalin) is a dopamine reuptake inhibitor. In the short term, methylphenidate is well tolerated. However, long-term studies have not been conducted in adults, and concerns about long-term effects like increases in blood pressure have not been established.

The slow and long-acting nonstimulant atomoxetine (Strattera), is primarily a norepinephrine reuptake inhibitor and, to a lesser extent, a dopamine reuptake inhibitor. It is sometimes prescribed in adults who do not get enough vigilant concentration response from mixed amphetamine salts (Adderall) or get too many side effects. It is also approved for ADHD by the US Food and Drug Administration.

The use of cholinergic adjunctive medications is uncommon and their clinical effects are poorly researched; consequently, cholinergics such as galantamine or varenicline would be off label use for ADHD. New nicotinic cholinergic medications in development for ADHD are pozanicline, ABT-418, and ABT-894.

== Prognosis ==
=== Self-esteem ===
In some cases, children who enjoy learning may develop a sense of fear when faced with structured or planned work, especially long or group-based assignments that require extended focus, even if they thoroughly understand the topic. Children with ADHD-PI may be at greater risk of academic failure and early withdrawal from school. Teachers and parents may make incorrect assumptions about the behaviors and attitudes of a child with ADHD-PI, and may provide them with frequent and erroneous negative feedback (e.g. "you're careless", "you're irresponsible", "you're immature", "you're lazy", "you don't care/show any effort", "you just aren't trying", etc.).

The inattentive children may realize on some level that they are somehow different internally from their peers. However, they are also likely to accept and internalize the continuous negative feedback, creating a negative self-image that becomes self-reinforcing. If these children progress into adulthood undiagnosed or untreated, their inattentiveness, ongoing frustrations, and poor self-image frequently create numerous and severe problems maintaining healthy relationships, succeeding in postsecondary schooling, or succeeding in the workplace. These problems can compound frustrations and low self-esteem and will often lead to the development of secondary pathologies including anxiety disorders, mood disorders, and substance abuse.

=== Coping and age ===
It has been suggested that some of the symptoms of ADHD present in childhood appear to be less overt in adulthood. This is likely due to an adult's ability to make cognitive adjustments and develop compensating or coping skills to minimize the impact of inattentive or hyperactive symptoms. However, the core problems of ADHD do not disappear with age. Some researchers have suggested that individuals with reduced or less overt hyperactivity symptoms should receive the ADHD-combined diagnosis. Hallowell and Ratey (2005) suggest that the manifestation of hyperactivity simply changes with adolescence and adulthood, becoming a more generalized restlessness or tendency to fidget.

=== Comparisons between subtypes ===
A meta-analysis of 37 studies on cognitive differences between those presenting ADHD-Predominantly Inattentive presentations and ADHD-Combined type found that "the ADHD-C presenting performed better than the ADHD-PI presenting in the areas of processing speed, attention, performance IQ, memory, and fluency. The ADHD-PI presenting performed better than the ADHD-C group on measures of flexibility, working memory, visual/spatial ability, non-verbal IQ, motor ability, and language. Both the ADHD-C and ADHD-PI groups were found to perform more poorly than the control group on measures of inhibition, however, there was no difference found between the two groups. Furthermore, the ADHD-C and ADHD-PI presenting did not differ on measures of sustained attention."

== Epidemiology ==
It is difficult to say exactly how many children or adults worldwide have ADHD because different countries have used different ways of diagnosing it, while some do not diagnose it at all. In the UK, diagnosis is based on quite a narrow set of symptoms, and about 0.5–1% of children are thought to have attention or hyperactivity problems. In comparison, professionals in the U.S. used a much broader definition of the term ADHD until recently. This meant up to 10% of children in the U.S. were described as having ADHD. Current estimates suggest that ADHD is present internationally in about 7.2% of children. ADHD is diagnosed around 5 times more often in boys than girls. Reasons for this disparity are debated, but likely involve both biological and social/diagnostic factors. Some theorize this may be because of the particular ways they express their difficulties. Boys and girls both have attention problems, but due to differences in gender and symptoms, boys may come off as more active in their symptoms and therefore seem harder to manage. Children from all cultures and social groups are diagnosed with ADHD. However, children from certain backgrounds may be particularly likely to be diagnosed with ADHD, due to different expectations about how they should behave. It is, therefore, important to ensure that a child's cultural background is understood and taken into account as part of the assessment.

== History ==
In 1980, the DSM-III changed the name of the condition from "hyperkinetic reaction of childhood" to "attention deficit disorder" (ADD), as research by Virginia Douglas had suggested deficits in attention and impulse control were more important than hyperactive behavior for understanding the disorder. The new label also reflected the observation of clinicians that attention deficits could also exist without hyperactivity. Deficits in sustained attention or vigilance could separate the disorder from other psychiatric disorders.

For the first time, two subtypes were introduced: ADD with hyperactivity (ADD+H) and ADD without hyperactivity (ADD-H). While the ADD+H category was fairly consistent with previous definitions, the latter subtype represented essentially a new category. Thus, almost everything that is known about the predominantly inattentive subtype is based on research conducted since 1980. Those diagnosed with ADD-H were distinguished as more prone to daydreaming and developing lethargic and hypoactive behaviors in academic settings. In 1987, revisions to DSM renamed the disorder to "attention deficit hyperactivity disorder" (ADHD). The DSM combined the symptoms lists for inattentive, impulsivity, and hyperactivity into a single list.
