= Concerted cultivation =

Style of parenting

Concerted cultivation is a parenting style or parenting practice marked by a parent's attempts to foster their child's talents by incorporating organized activities in their children's lives. The expression is attributed to Annette Lareau. This parenting style is commonly exhibited in middle-class and upper-class American families, and is also characterized by consciously developing language use and ability to interact with social institutions. Many have attributed cultural benefits to this form of child-rearing due to the style's use in higher income families, conversely affecting the social habitus of children raised in such a manner. A child that has been concertedly cultivated will often express greater social prowess in social situations involving formality or structure attributed to their increased experience and engagement in organized clubs, sports, musical groups as well as increased experience with adults and power structure. This pattern of child rearing has been linked to an increase in financial and academic success.

Negative considerations have included higher levels of adolescent psychopathology, an overburdened sense of entitlement, potentially disrespectful behavior toward authority figures, lack of creativity, and the psychosomatic inability to play or relax. As a result, advocates of slow parenting prefer less management of childhood activities. None of these effects can be considered without broader cultural and economic considerations.

Concerted cultivation also emphasizes the use of reasoning skills and variations in language use. Parents start to encourage their children to learn how to speak with adults so that they become comfortable and understand the importance of eye contact and speaking properly at an earlier age. According to Lareau, with these types of experiences, middle-class parents try to pursue the concerted cultivation approach. A concerted cultivation approach encourages children to see adults as their equals. Children start to form a certain sense of entitlement because of their early comfort interacting with adults. Children also become more comfortable questioning adults, and it is easier for them to see themselves as equals. With concerted cultivation, the practices often infiltrate into the family life. Frequent gatherings provide opportunities for further cultivation such as eating at the dinner table together.

== Structured activities ==
American middle class parents engage in concerted cultivation parenting by attempting to foster children's talents through organized leisure activities, which theoretically teach them to respect authority and how to interact in a structured environment. Learning how to interact in a structured environment much like a classroom gives students a head start in school because they are identified as intelligent or 'good' students. Other aspects of concerted cultivation include emphasis on reasoning skills and language use. Parents challenge their children to think critically and to speak properly and frequently, especially when interacting with adults. These skills also set the child apart in academic settings as well as give them confidence in social situations. By learning these traits, they are advancing themselves in their surroundings. Another difference is the involvement parents have in their children's lives. Parents are much more involved in following their children's academic progression. Through this process children from a concerted cultivation upbringing supposedly feel more entitled in their academic endeavors and will feel more responsible because they know that their parents are highly involved.

== Parenting practices ==
In social stratification (a specific area of study in sociology) different parenting practices lead children to have different upbringings. Differences in child rearing are identified and associated with different social classes.

The two types of child rearing that are introduced by Annette Lareau are concerted cultivation and natural growth. Concerted cultivation parenting is associated with those parents who have traditionally white collar jobs and those considered to be part of the upper class. Natural growth parenting is associated with blue collar workers of the working class. Parenting practices do not apply exclusively to social classes, but they are highly correlated.

=== Critical overview ===
The techniques of child rearing that a parent uses when raising a child ultimately have a great effect on the child and how he or she develops. The difference between the two types presented by Annette Lareau is that concerted cultivation will in most cases provide a child with skills and advantages over natural growth children in the classroom and eventually in their careers. This is where parenting practices play into a larger social inequality issue. Social inequality results from a lack of educational and employment opportunities as well as the lower social status for the poor. This creates various difficulties for the poor and there are fewer opportunities to provide attentive care for their children. The natural growth parenting style arises under these disadvantaged circumstances. Natural growth is then perpetuated because these children will not be as well suited for the work force, and therefore, will make less money, and will most likely not be able to give their children a concerted cultivation upbringing. The critical issue is the difference in opportunities. Children of concerted cultivation, along with their upbringing, are typically provided with connections from their parents, friends, and activities that give them a step up in life. These advantages are perpetuated and inequality continues to exist.

=== Natural growth ===
Parents in the working class (and typically with lower incomes) engage their children in the accomplishment of natural growth. Children usually have more unstructured time and therefore create their own activities to occupy themselves. This environment does not prepare children to survive in settings that are very structured, such as schools. In working class households, the parents have less time to spend with children and do not have the money to hire help. Accompanying the strain on time, working-class parents are left with less time to get involved with their children's schooling and activities; therefore, they leave this up to the professionals. This approach is often not intentional. Rather, external factors like jobs with little flexibility in hours may cause difficulties scheduling meetings with teachers. Consequently, parents may feel frustrated and powerless, and children do not receive the sense of entitlement and support that comes with concerted cultivation. Having less time outside of jobs can also lead to less congruence between parents in their child-rearing practices. Having less consistency can cause the child to become more inhibited and reserved.

However, natural growth is comparable to slow parenting, advocated by well-informed and financially stable parents who wish their children to be more independent and imaginative.

=== Ethnic differences in parenting ===
Though there is evidence that ethnicity is linked to class, in parenting, ethnicity has a much lesser impact on a child's development than social class. Social class, wealth, and income have a much more of an effect on what child rearing practices will be used, rather than the ethnicity of the parents or children. The correlation between ethnicity and social class comes from the perpetuated inequality in the distribution of wealth in the United States of America. The lack of money is the defining factor in the style of child rearing that is chosen, and minorities are more likely to have less wealth or assets available for use in their children's upbringing. Wealth and connections among middle-class parents also defines how these children enter the labor market, with or without help in finding jobs.

=== Inequality ===
Inequality exists in the opportunities that lead to different child-rearing practices but they also cause many other differences, such as the quality of schools, as a result of differences in wealth, income, and assets. The schools in the wealthier neighborhoods have more money to hire better teachers, staff, and materials that improve education. In addition to having better teaching and materials, the schools have more money to make renovations, have a better appearance, and the children develop a sense of confidence and entitlement because they feel that they are learning in an environment of excellence. The quality of the parents work life varies dramatically as well, and this plays into how much time and energy parents have to spend engaging their children. If inequality was not such a powerful force in America, resources, funds, and schools would be distributed more evenly.

== See also ==
- After-school activity
- Educational inequality
- Helicopter parent
- Hidden curriculum
- Mozart effect
- Parenting
- Slow parenting
- Soccer mom
- Socialization
