= Strict father model =

Parenting style

The strict father model of parenting is one which values strict discipline, particularly by the father, in parenting. The strict mother model also exists.

Ideas involved in this model include:

- That children learn through reward and punishment, as in operant conditioning. Corporal punishment, such as spanking, is favored in this model relative to other models.
- That children become more self-reliant and more self-disciplined by having strict parents.
- That the parent, particularly the father, is meant to mete out rewards for good behavior as well as punish bad behavior.

This model of child-rearing would involve, for example, allowing children to cry themselves to sleep on the grounds that picking up a child when it should be sleeping on its own improperly fosters dependence on the parents. In his book Dare to Discipline, James Dobson advocates the strict father model. However, some researchers have linked authoritarian childrearing with children who withdraw, lack spontaneity, and have lesser evidence of conscience.

The strict father model is discussed by George Lakoff in his books, including Moral Politics, Don't Think of an Elephant, The Political Mind, and Whose Freedom?. In these books, the strict father model is contrasted with the nurturant parent model. Lakoff argues that if the metaphor of nation as family and government as parent is used, then conservative politics correspond to the strict father model. For example, conservatives think that adults should refrain from looking to the government for assistance lest they become dependent.
