= Tom Hodgkinson =

British writer

- Hodgkinson at 2009 event, "The Great Escape"
- Born: Newcastle, England
- Education: Jesus College, Cambridge
- Occupations: Journalist, author
- Writing career
- Period: 1993–present
- Genres: Politics, satire
- Notable works: The Idler (editor); How to be Idle; How to be Free; The Idle Parent
- Literary movement: Idling
- Website: idler.co.uk

Tom Hodgkinson is a British writer and the editor of The Idler magazine, which he established in 1993 with his friend Gavin Pretor-Pinney. His philosophy, in his published books and articles, is of a relaxed approach to life, enjoying it as it comes rather than toiling for an imagined better future. The Idler was named after a series of essays written by Dr Johnson from 1758 to 1760.

== Biography ==
Tom Hodgkinson was born in Newcastle, England. He is the brother of journalist and author Will Hodgkinson; their father is the science and medical writer Neville Hodgkinson and their mother is the prolific non-fiction writer and journalist Liz Hodgkinson.

Hodgkinson was educated at Westminster School and Jesus College, Cambridge, during which time he played the bass guitar in the Stupids-influenced thrash band Chopper. He lived in North Devon until 2013. He currently lives in London.

In the early 1990s, he worked at a Rough Trade Records shop in London, where he had the idea for The Idler. In the late 1990s, he became an importer of absinthe.

Hodgkinson has contributed articles to The Sunday Telegraph, The Guardian and The Sunday Times as well as being the author of the Idler spin-offs, How To Be Idle, How To Be Free and The Idle Parent.

In 2006, he created National Unawareness Day, to be celebrated on 1 November.

In March 2011, he and his partner Victoria Hull launched The Idler Academy in London, a school running courses in philosophy, public speaking, grammar, ukulele, singing, drawing, calligraphy, astronomy, foraging, bread baking, bartitsu and small business.

In April 2013, he launched the Idler Academy Bad Grammar Award, and in September 2013 he launched the Ukulele Player of the Year competition. Bloomsbury UK and Bloomsbury US published his and Gavin's book, The Ukulele Handbook.

== Bibliography ==
- The Idler (periodical: 1993–present)
- How To Be Idle (2005)
- How To Be Free (2006)

- Republished as The Freedom Manifesto (US Release, 2007)

- The Idle Parent (2009)
- The Book of Idle Pleasures (May 2010; co-edited with Dan Kieran)
- Brave Old World (2011)

- Republished as How to Live in the Country (2021)

- The Ukulele Handbook (September 2013; co-written with Vampire Weekend)
- Business for Bohemians (2017)
- An Idler's Manual (2021)
- How to Live Like a Stoic (2026)

== See also ==
- Simple living
