= The Price of Privilege =

2006 book by Madeline Levine

- Author: Madeline Levine, Ph.D.
- Publisher: HarperCollins
- Publication date: 2006
- Media type: Hardcover
- Pages: 224, 236 including notes.
- ISBN: 0-06-059584-1
- OCLC: 62393252
- Dewey Decimal: 649/.156 22
- LC Class: HQ769 .L394 2006

The Price of Privilege is a non-fiction book by Madeline Levine. The book's primary thesis is that teenagers from affluent families have more intense psychological problems than expected.

== Overview ==
Levine maintains that children from rich families with psychological dysfunctions have been ignored because many people assume the wealthy have the resources to take care of themselves. Her findings are based on her experience as a psychologist working with children in Marin County and related clinical studies. She defines affluence as a yearly household income in the US$120,000 to $160,000 range.

Over the course of her practice, the author observed many teenage patients, from affluent households, with excellent grades in school, extracurricular involvement and an appearance of thriving in their environment. According to Levine, many of these teens suffered debilitating neuroses, such as anxiety, depression, drug addiction, anorexia, and self-harm. She noted two key indicators of this dysfunction: achievement pressure and emotional isolation from parents. In affluent communities, according to Levine, external accomplishments such as prestige, power, and money for adults, or grades, clothes, and electronics for kids, become more important than happiness or human agency.

Levine states that there is an inverse relationship between parental income and closeness between children and parents. She suggests that the ritual of eating dinner as a family indicates a healthy closeness; children in such a family are much less likely to have psychological problems.

Dr. Levine refers to the research of Dr. Baumrind in distinguishing three styles of parenting: authoritarian, permissive, and authoritative. She makes a number of recommendations on parenting style, based on this model. She reports that a mother's own happiness is the key to raising psychologically healthy kids, and found that there is an unexpectedly high rate of depression, anxiety, substance abuse, loneliness, and overall unhappiness among mothers of affluent households. This is damaging to the children as well as the mother.

The parents' emphasis on perfection is criticised; those parents who attempt to convey an image of flawless and effortless perfection at work and at home or in society, may in fact damage the self-confidence and development of the children. Real achievements are the results of hard work, often associated with occasional failures that one has to overcome.

== Structure ==
The book is divided into four parts:

Part	Title
I	The Diagnosis
II	How the affluence culture hinders self-development
III	Good parenting. Parenting for Autonomy
IV	Independent Self

== Criticism ==
The book is not based on statistically significant data about proportions of patients from each type of background, and reporting each type of problem. Rather, Dr Levine may be describing a trend that she believes she has seen amongst those people who choose (and can afford) to come to her for help.

== See also ==
- Parenting styles
- Slow parenting
- Free-range parenting
