= Secret Garden (outdoor nursery) =

Outdoor preschool in Fife, Scotland

Coordinates: 56.321°N 3.125°W

The Secret Garden is an outdoor nursery school in Letham, Fife, Scotland, for children aged 3–7 years. It is a forest kindergarten in which children walk to a woodland every day, in almost any weather. They use the natural resources they find there rather than modern toys (although with some additional equipment) to learn according to the government educational framework under the heading "Nature as Teacher".

The Secret Garden was started in 2008 by Cathy Bache, a drama and primary teacher and parent of three. Before opening this, she provided childcare to a smaller number of children, and developed her ideas during this time.

Forest kindergartens were started in the 1950s and became popular in Germany in the 1990s.

== Motivation ==
Cathy Bache writes of being a drama teacher, "I believe that this formative training in developing, intuiting and supporting the child’s mind to open in a creative and expressive way to the full realms of the imagination has led me to where I am now: in the woods with pre-school children, supporting the creation of their own magic. We have no toys, limited practical resources of useful tools but plenty of space and opportunity to go where the imagination may take us.

"Within the woodland there is space and freedom, a wildness and variety of landscapes to explore and play, offering the children: mystery, magic and adventure, places to hide in, dens to create, physical and dexterous skills to develop. It is recognised that the senses of a child are stimulated within the natural environment; their desire to look, listen, touch, taste and smell heightened, leading them to develop curiosity, discovery, a graceful learning of what is happening for the individual, the group, the woodland and its inhabitants.

== Funding and eligibility ==
The Secret Garden is funded by government grants and private donors, but does not operate for profit. Children are entitled to use government funding credits in the nursery, and parents can supplement this with tax free childcare vouchers or ordinary payments.

It has received over £7000 from the National Lottery.

It is open 49 weeks a year, for children aged 3–5. Priority of places is given to children from within the catchment area of Letham Primary School and existing clients. Parents can choose to spend their child's standard government funded nursery hours there, or pay for additional time. Tax free vouchers from an employer may be used.

== Awards ==
Newspapers and magazines have written articles on the Secret Garden, including the weekly news magazine Maclean's in Canada, and The Guardian in Britain.

It has been awarded Play Scotland Achievement Award for 'Best Practice in Action'.

On 6 September 2008, staff and ex-students of the Secret Garden attended the Nancy Ovens Awards for Play ceremony at 'House for an Art Lover' in Bellahouston Park, Glasgow. The award for 'Outstanding Contribution to Play' was presented to Cathy Bache and The Secret Garden by Adam Ingram MSP, Minister for Children and Early Years.

The Scottish Government Early Years Framework and other government agencies highlight the Secret Garden as an example of good practice, recommending it to other schools.

== See also ==
- Outdoor Education
