= Liz Hodgkinson =

British journalist

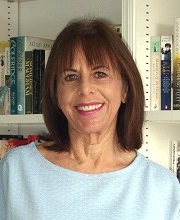
- Liz Hodgkinson in March 2017
- Born: 1945 (age 80–81); St Neots, Cambridgeshire, England
- Education: Durham University
- Occupations: Journalist, author
- Writing career
- Period: 1966–present
- Genres: Health, Lifestyle, Biography, Property
- Website: www.lizhodgkinson.com

Liz Hodgkinson (born 1945) is a British author and journalist who has written more than 50 books. Her books have been translated into over 20 languages. She has also written articles for most of the major British national newspapers in London, and for magazines for women. She has taught journalism for a decade.

== Early life ==
Hodgkinson was born Elizabeth Garrett, and grew up, in the small Cambridgeshire town of St Neots.

She attended Huntingdon Grammar School, which was co-educational and which is now named Hinchingbrooke School. At the school, she became a close friend of Amaryllis Garnett and was influenced by the bohemian household of David and Angelica Garnett. She has written that her parents would have been happy enough for her to leave school at 16 and train as a secretary. "They had no idea of higher education or careers." However, she wanted more from a career, so she attended Durham University where she studied English. Hodgkinson has written that her period at university was dominated by an obsession she developed for a male student, which began at first sight and was to overshadow her subsequent relationships.

== Career ==
After a short stint teaching, Hodgkinson became a freelance reporter and columnist. At first, in the years 1966–1970, she worked in Newcastle upon Tyne in north-east England, on the Thomson Newspapers the Evening Chronicle, the Newcastle Journal, and the Sunday Sun.

During these years, she married Neville Hodgkinson, also a journalist, who would also become a Daily Mail science and medical columnist and author of books. The couple's sons, Tom and Will, have both became journalists and authors like their parents.

The family moved to London, to a house in Richmond, and (like her husband) Hodgkinson gained a series of jobs in Fleet Street. In 1971–1972, Hodgkinson was Deputy Editor of the mother and baby magazine Modern Mother (long since closed), and then in 1972–1973 she worked as a columnist on the London Evening News. She then worked on four national newspapers: the Sunday People, The Sun, the Daily Mail, and The Times, where she was Women's Editor for a period during 1986. After that, in 1986 she became a freelance journalist, writing for The Times, The Guardian, The Independent, and the London Evening Standard, and again for the Daily Mail.

Using her experience as a journalist, Hodgkinson taught beginner, intermediate, and advanced classes in journalism at City Literary Institute for 10 years (1995–2005). One of her books, Ladies of the Street, was about the women who transformed journalism in Britain, from the heart of London in Fleet Street, from the late 19th century to the present day.

Hodgkinson's books are mostly devoted to four main subject areas, over time: first health; then lifestyle, including topics around religion and special ways of life (influenced by her by then ex-husband Neville's involvement with Indian religion); then biography, particularly of some individuals with changing sexuality; and latterly, as a complete change, real estate and property matters.

She continues to contribute to publications and websites, including the Daily Mail’s Femail pages, The Daily Telegraph, and the magazines House Beautiful, The Lady, and Woman.

== Later life ==
In the 1981, Hodgkinson's husband Neville became involved with the Brahma Kumaris religious movement. Seven years later, when their sons had reached adulthood, the couple amicably separated. Neville wrote that he deeply loved his wife but his spiritual journey affected the relationship. He moved to the Brahma Kumaris retreat centre at Nuneham House, Oxfordshire.

In the late 1980s, possibly as part of this personal crisis, although theirs was an amicable divorce, she began to think about the subject of how people can deal with such situations, and published a book on celibacy as a solution to personal problems. She followed that with Bodyshock, a journalism book on transsexuality.

After her divorce, she again suffered obsessive thoughts about a male student from her university days. She sought psychotherapy and wrote a book on the experience: "I believe that with obsessive love, time is no healer at all. The experience of obsessive love can be likened to dropping a stitch in knitting, and never picking it up. The knitting never quite looks right from then on, unless we unpick it and start again from the mistake." She became friends with journalist John Sandilands, then saw him as her partner; and for many years they shared a holiday flat in Worthing, West Sussex; but she has lived alone since his death in 2004. She has (as of late 2016) between them given her five grandchildren.

She is a member of the Society of Authors, the Guild of Health Writers and the National Landlords’ Association.

== Bibliography ==
=== Biographical ===
- Body Shock: The Truth About Changing Sex September (1987), Virgin Books
- Michael née Laura: The story of the world's first female-to-male transsexual (April 1989), Virgin Books
- Ladies of the Street: The Women Who Transformed Journalism (November 2008), Revel Barker
- Alex Williams: TheSurvival of an Artist (May 2012), Quartet Books
- From a Girl to a Man: How Laura Became Michael Paperback – Illustrated (October 2015), Quartet Books
- Dadi Janki - A Century of Service (2015), Brahma Kumaris Information Services

=== Health ===
- Addictions: What They Are, Why They Happen, How to Help (A Life crisis book) (May 1986), HarperCollins
- The Zinc Solution (October 1986). Arrow Books
- Smile Therapy — How Smiling and Laughter Can Change Your Life (August 1987), Optima
- How to Banish Cellulite Forever (April 1989), Grafton
- 20 Ways to Check Your Health (1990), Reader's Digest
- The Anti-cellulite Recipe Book (April 1992), Thorsons
- Counselling: What it is, How it Works, How it Can Help You (April 1992), Simon & Schuster
- How to Stop Snoring (December 1992), Thorsons
- Psychic Counselling (March 1994), Aquarian Press
- The Bristol Experience: Personal Assessment of the Unique Life-enhancing Programme for Cancer Patients and Carers (March 1995), Vermilion
- Alcoholism (Your Questions Answered) (August 1995), Cassell Illustrated
- Eating Disorders (Your Questions Answered) (August 1995), Cassell Illustrated
- Drug Abuse: Your Questions Answered (September 1995), Cassell Illustrated
- Alzheimer's Disease (Your Questions Answered) (September 1995), Cassell Illustrated
- The Drinking Water Cure (1996), Carnell plc
- The Anti-Cellulite Plan (April 1997), Thorsons
- Spiritual Healing: Everything You Want to Know (September 1990), Piatkus Books
- The Alexander Technique and How It Can Help You (1990), Judy Piatkus

=== Lifestyle ===
- The Working Woman's Guide (Whole woman books) (September 1985), Thorsons
- Bhagwan: The God That Failed May (1986), Sphere Books
- Sex is not compulsory: giving up sex for better health and greater happiness (January 1988), Sphere Books
- Unholy matrimony : the case for abolishing marriage (June 1988), Columbus Books
- Reincarnation: the Evidence (October 1989), Piatkus Books
- Obsessive Love: How to Free Your Emotions and Live Again (October 1991), Piatkus Books
- The Personal Growth Handbook (1993), Piatkus Books
- Happy to Be Single: The Pleasures of Independence (January 1993), Thorsons
- Codependency: How to Break Free and Live Your Own Life (July 1998), Piatkus Books
- Peace and Purity: The Story of the Brahma Kumaris (November 1999), Rider & Co
- The Handbook of Ayurveda : India's Medical Wisdom Explained (2006), Kyle Cathie Limited
- Peace and Purity: The Story of a Spiritual Revolution (May 2012), HarperCollins
- Why Women Believe in God (October 2012), Circle Books
- Memoirs of a Party Animal (November 2015), lulu.com

=== Property ===
- The Complete Guide to Letting Property (February 2002), Kogan Page
- The complete guide to buying property abroad (2002, 2006, 2007, 2008), Kogan Page
- How To Buy A Flat: All You Need to Know on Apartment Living and Letting (June 2006), How To Books
- The Complete Guide to Letting Property: Including Information on Buy-to-let, HIPs and Tenancy Deposit Schemes (October 2006), Kogan Page
- The Complete Guide to Renovating and Improving Your Property (December 2006), Kogan Page
- Safe as Houses? The Homeowner's Guide to Property, Inheritance and Taxation (October 2007), Kogan Page
- The Complete Guide to Investing in Property (February 2009), Kogan Page
