= Slow parenting =

Parenting style

Slow parenting (also called simplicity parenting) is a parenting style in which few activities are organised for children. Instead, they are allowed to explore the world at their own pace. It is a response to concerted cultivation and the widespread trend for parents to schedule activities and classes after school; to solve problems on behalf of the children, and to buy services from commercial suppliers rather than letting nature take its course.

The philosophy, stemming at least partially from the Slow Movement, makes recommendations in play, toys, access to nature and scheduled activities. The opposing view is that such children are disadvantaged because their parents do not provide as many learning opportunities.

== Goals ==
The goal of slow parenting is to allow children to be happy and satisfied with their own achievements, even though this may not make them the wealthiest or most famous. These parents suggest that children of other parents are unable to cope with the unpredictability of the real world, either expecting their helicopter parents to intervene, or complaining about unfairness. They may not even understand who they are themselves until much later in adulthood.

=== Play ===
Play is a natural part of childhood, which allows young people to explore and discover at their own pace. Children invest 15% of their energy into play. Children have a natural skill for playing and exploring in a way that is appropriate. Other mammals also play in developing their own skills in a realistic but less dangerous environment. However, formal learning is more beneficial from the age of six. Toys, technology and an adult-imposed educational curriculum are not required, according to the philosophy.

=== Television ===
In general, slow parenting does not advocate watching television. Television is not interactive; a person can watch it with little thinking and no action. It can occupy an enormous amount of time, and some programs are inappropriate for children. At the same time, it is often created by commercial interests with minimal investment in the program content and a maximum of advertising. The social aspects of television are widely discussed and often considered to be negative. Introducing children to television (including families watching it together) is a recommendation to continue this lifestyle, and a discouragement to any other play or activity.

It is believed that television advertisements often encourage people further into consumerism by promoting expensive objects which are often unnecessary and ultimately unsatisfying (a satisfied customer may not need to make further purchases). The presentation of these to people who are tired or not concentrating is a further risk to their behavioural development.

However, it is recognised that television is a convenient baby-sitter, and that some programs are enjoyable (The Idle Parent contains a list of the author's favourites). Choices might include watching only ten-year-old pre-recorded video tapes or watching broadcast television with children and giving a real-time commentary on the content and its message.

=== Safety ===
Everyday life does contain risk. Slow parenting advocates would argue that in order to develop a healthy understanding of that, children must be allowed to face risks.

Because many parents have themselves been raised in a risk-averse way, Slow Parenting advocates would maintain that they are often unable to judge which risks are significant. For example, stranger danger, a cornerstone of child "safety", has been criticized for allegedly assuming that all strangers are dangerous, and by negative inference that all familiar people are safe.

An open letter by more than one hundred leading pediatricians, academics, and authors, published in The Daily Telegraph, highlighted how a fast-paced and consumerist lifestyle has emphasized the fear of physical harm and the subsequent emotional and social damage to children. The newspaper then invited responses from the public and received nearly 120 pro-slow-parenting responses within days. These highlighted frequent assessment, political interference, junk food, television, compulsory schooling, distrust of teachers, and many other areas. Some suggested forest schools and other adventure activities, while many proposed less political interference with schools.

=== Family ===
Spending time with children is always recommended for parents. The book The Price of Privilege finds that eating dinner together as a family is an indicator of good psychological health. Tom Hodgkinson's ideal scenario is to be near his children, although not too near.

== Synonyms and variations ==
The idea of slow parenting has been repeated by many authors and commentators, many of whom have attached their own names. A few are briefly reviewed below:

=== Slow movement ===
In his book Under Pressure: Rescuing Our Children From the Culture of Hyper-parenting, Carl Honoré describes a measured and caring way of stepping back and letting children face the world themselves. Parts of UP have been serialised in the Daily Telegraph. The author has previously written about the Slow Movement in his book In Praise of Slowness.

Honoré steps through the stages of adult intervention in childhood, arguing that many adults drive their children towards goals they have chosen but which are often not suitable. The freedom to play is repeatedly endorsed, with Honoré providing examples that he believes shows that interfering in this often makes less effective use of their time, and damages their development. He highlights some particular educational techniques, such as the Reggio Emilia approach and Forest kindergartens, notably the Secret Garden in Scotland, where the mature attitude to risk is contrasted with the health-and-safety mentality that is more generally taken. Within school, testing and homework are singled out for criticism, while after-school activities are thought to take time away from more enjoyable times. Even sports, which are basically enjoyable and healthy, become detrimental when adults impose their focus on winning.

Consumerism, in particular the pester-power of toy advertising is said to push children and adults apart, converting their enthusiasm into a lust for costly and often useless goods.

Risk aversion in helicopter parents is said to leave children unable to handle risks.

In her book Conscious Parenting: Mindful Living Course for Parents, Nataša Pantović describes the negative social aspects of modern technologies that discourage any other play or activity.

Within her Conscious Parenting Book explaining the importance of Free Play Nataša says: "Children learn intuitively, perceiving the subtle inner relationships observing nature. Free creative play is an invaluable gift that children need to start properly relating to the outside world. Exploring, experiencing and imitating the world of grown-us through free play, children are given a chance to unconsciously learn and emotionally mature through their own games. Too much of today’s learning is structured, children are 'directed', 'instructed' and carefully 'followed' at all times, so they do not have a chance to experience learning through unobstructed observation. Children have deep devotion to life and this devotion is beautifully expressed through the free play".. The author has previously published 5 Mindfulness Books within Serial called: AoL Mindfulness Training.

Nataša researches and supports the Finnish educational model where schools testing and homework are discouraged and where competition is not emphasized. In her article 'Create Freedom in the Learning Environment': Nuit says: "Children need to feel our love at all times; our love gives them confidence that they are heard, that they are present, and that they matter. A warm, loving and gentle environment is absorbed unconsciously and it gives children a wonderful start to life".

=== The idle parent ===
The Idle Parent by Tom Hodgkinson in 2009 is an alternative to over-parenting. It has also been serialised in a newspaper column in the Daily Telegraph. The central premise is that children can take care of themselves most of the time, and that the parents would be happier if they spent more time taking care of themselves too. Hodgkinson's idle parenting "does not refer to slobbing out or giving up, but rather to letting go, going with the flow, a wise and merry detachment. It is, in Aldous Huxley's phrase, an 'active resignation'." IP does not have to be costly: Many activities are free, such as lighting a fire; while others are cheap, such as buying 10-year-old video tapes from charity shops.

Alongside the jests about how much children like to work, and so should be returned to Victorian workhouses, are points about letting children try to make their own breakfast (while the parents sleep), or camping in a field instead of going to an "antiseptic children's fun palace". The Idle Parent constantly moderates its zeal, for example in how completely to ban the use of television, against the excess of the Puritans.

== See also ==
- Free-range parenting
- Waldorf education
- Forest kindergarten
- Helicopter parent (opposite)
- Concerted cultivation (opposite)
- Slow living
- Slow Movement
- The Price of Privilege
