= Madeline Levine =

American psychologist and writer

Madeline Levine is an American psychologist and writer.

Her first book in 1996 was an analysis of the negative effects of media violence on child development. It included parental advice on mitigation. Her third book The Price of Privilege is a study of the psychological ailments plaguing teens from affluent families. The Price of Privilege is based not only on her 25 years of experience in treating such teens within Marin County (an affluent community within the San Francisco Bay Area) but also on her consultations with colleagues around the United States—particularly research psychologist Suniya S. Luthar.

== Works ==
- Viewing Violence, 1996,
- See No Evil: A Guide to Protecting Our Children from Media Violence, 1998
- The Price of Privilege, 2006
- Teach your Children Well, 2012.
- Ready or Not: Preparing Our Kids to Thrive in an Uncertain and Rapidly Changing World
