= Jewish Student Union =

Jewish youth organization

- Formation: 2002
- Affiliations: National Conference of Synagogue Youth; Orthodox Union
- Website: www.dojsu.com

The Jewish Student Union, or JSU is an organization run by the Orthodox Union's youth group, NCSY. Created in 2002, JSU attempts to create Jewish culture clubs in public schools across the United States.

JSU was created to serve a broad spectrum of Jewish teens from all different backgrounds and affiliations. Clubs bearing the "JSU" or "Jewish Student Union" name are run by the Orthodox Union.

JSU clubs are aimed at educating Jewish youth in public schools about Jewish culture, heritage, and religion. The mission of Jewish Student Union is to encourage more Jewish teens attending public high schools "to do something Jewish! That's it! It's that simple!!!" JSU currently has clubs throughout Canada and the United States.

== Partners ==
JSU partners with a variety of Jewish organizations to provide programming. JSU receives funding, including donations of in-kind support, predominantly from the Orthodox Union, and private foundations.
