= Think Together =

California non-profit offering learning programs for children

- Formation: 1994
- Headquarters: Santa Ana, California, U.S.
- President: Randy Barth, Founder and CEO
- Website: thinktogether.org

Think Together is a California-based nonprofit organization that works with school districts and local communities to offer extended learning programs for underprivileged and low-income children. In addition to supplementing in-school programs for students in grades K-12, the organization also offers summer and intersession programs, early learning support and community programs held outside of schools. The company also offers teacher consulting services to help manage state mandates such as Common Core.

== History ==
The organization was launched in 1994 in the Shalimar neighborhood in Costa Mesa by Randy Barth, an investment advisor. He organized a group of volunteers from St. Andrew’s Presbyterian Church, St. Joachim’s Catholic Church, and Women of Vision with the intent to provide a safe place for the local children to study and get education support. During the years of 1997 through 2003 the organization raised funds from private donations and used it to establish over a dozen learning centers.

In 2004 Think Together partnered with the Tustin and Santa Ana unified school districts to continue its expansion, as they were now able to receive access to state and federal funding for after school programs. The organization continued to grow after receiving funding from the After School Education and Safety (ASES) Act and via grants from companies such as Irvine Company, Southern California Edison and Walmart. In 2011 Think Together received $3.5M from the Walmart Foundation in order to help fund nutrition and educational programs for school children in Southern California, which they would receive over the process of a three-year period. That same year they also partnered with Matthew McConaughey's Just Keep Livin Foundation in order to offer nutrition and health programs at two Orange County campuses. In January 2014 Think Together partnered with the Whittier-based PRINCIPAL's Exchange to help improve technical training in the classrooms of California's large at-risk schools. The joint program's focus is to help districts implement new state and federal education mandates, including the Common Core curriculum, Smarter Balanced testing, and California's Local Control Funding Formula (LCFF).

The organization has reported that as of February 2015, they have reached over 100,000 students in over 400 public schools in 42 school districts. That same month Barth, along with former LA Times reporter Jennifer Delson, released a co-written history of the organization and guide for reforming the public education system, entitled THINK Together: How YOU can play a role in improving education in America.

In 2014, Think Together partnered with Principal's Exchange, a Whittier, CA-based group of instructional specialists that offered research, professional development and consulting to schools to help with teacher development and learning in areas such as Common Core. The partnership would reportedly allow Think Together to serve more students.

== Programs ==
Think Together has designed their programs to help underserved students close the achievement gap by providing academic support in multiple areas that include expanded learning, STEM fields, wellness and the arts, while also providing help with homework in a safe, adult-supervised environment. The organization also provides daily physical activity and nutrition education. Each after-school program site is staffed by a full-time Site Coordinator and part-time Program Leaders with a stated goal of maintaining a 20:1 student-to-adult ratio.

Through its affiliate Principal's Exchange, Think Together provides technical assistance to help teachers understand and manage the new practices and mandates that are being implemented at each school site, such as Common Core.

== Scholarships ==
Think Together offers several higher education scholarships to help students who have participated in their programs.

== Organization ==
The organization is headquartered in Santa Ana, California and is a not-for-profit organization with 501(c)(3) tax-exempt status. It serves the communities in Southern California, specifically the Bay Area, Los Angeles, Orange, Riverside, San Bernardino and San Diego.

Think Together has a Board of Directors with 21 members, composed of people with a mix of business and education backgrounds. The organization has listed their mission statement as "Changing the odds for kids."
