= Forest kindergarten =

Outdoor-based early learning approach

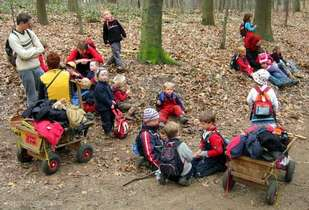
A forest kindergarten in Düsseldorf, Germany

Forest kindergarten is a type of preschool education for children between the ages of three and six that is held almost exclusively outdoors. Whatever the weather, children are encouraged to play, explore and learn in a forest environment. The adult supervision is meant to assist rather than lead. It is also known as Waldkindergarten (in German), outdoor nursery, or nature kindergarten. The concept is closely related to the broader Forest School model, which extends outdoor, experiential learning principles to older children and young people.

== Activities ==
A forest kindergarten can be described as a kindergarten "without a ceiling or walls". The daycare staff and children spend their time outdoors, typically in a forest. A distinctive feature of forest kindergartens is the emphasis on play with objects that can be found in nature, rather than commercial toys. Despite these differences, forest kindergartens are meant to fulfill the same basic purpose as other nurseries, namely, to care for, stimulate, and educate young children.

Each forest kindergarten is different, partly because the organisations are independently minded. But typical activities and goals may include:

Activity	Developmental benefit
Playing imaginative games using whatever resources and ideas come to mind	This helps children to explore their own thoughts without the guidance of a toy designer
Role play	Shared imagination, drama, teamwork, recollection of models of behaviour
Building shelters or other large structures from branches, with the help of other children and adults	This requires goal definition, planning, engineering, teamwork and perseverance
Counting objects or looking for mathematical patterns	Mathematics, visual recognition
Memory games using naturally available objects	Memory, naming objects
Listening to stories; singing songs and rhymes	Art, drama, concentration
Arranging items to make a picture, or building a toy	Art
Drawing scenes	Art, creativity, accurate inspection and copying
Climbing trees and exploring the forest	Improves strength, balance and physical awareness
Playing hide-and-seek with others	Develops children's theory of mind by rewarding accurate anticipation of the thoughts and actions of others
Walking to the woodland, from the building	Improves strength and stamina; preparation (e.g., route selection) improves planning and communication skills
Exploring or reflecting alone	Aids self-awareness and character development
Resting	Aids consolidation of memories and facilitates activities later in the day

== Location and organisation ==
Forest kindergartens operate mainly in woodland. There should be a building where children can shelter from extreme weather. They may also spend a small part of each day indoors, although that is more likely to be for administrative and organisational reasons, such as to provide a known location where parents can deliver and collect their children. If the woodland is too far away to walk, a vehicle might reluctantly be used for transport.

Children are encouraged to dress for the weather, with waterproof clothes and warm layers, according to the climate.

== History ==
In rural areas, and historical times, access to nature has not been a problem. Over the last century, with increasing urbanisation and "nature deficit disorder", there have been many changes in stance on outdoor education.

The first forest kindergarten was created by Ella Flautau in Denmark in the early 1950s. The idea formed gradually as a result of her often spending time with her own and neighbors' children in a nearby forest, a form of daycare which elicited great interest among the neighborhood parents. The parents formed a group and created an initiative to establish the first forest kindergarten.

In Sweden in 1957, an ex-military man, Gösta Frohm, created the idea of "Skogsmulle". "Skog" means wood in Swedish. "Mulle" is one of four fictional characters he created to teach children about nature, along with "Laxe" representing water, "Fjällfina" representing mountains and "Nova" representing an unpolluted nature. Forest schools based on Frohm's model, called "I Ur och Skur" (Rain or Shine Schools) moved the idea from occasional activities to formal nursery schools, being set up by Siw Linde in 1985. Juliet Robertson's review of Skogsmulle is a valuable modern-day summary.

Nature kindergartens have existed in Germany since 1968 but the first forest kindergarten was first officially recognized as a form of daycare in 1993, enabling state subsidies to reduce the daycare fees of children who attended forest kindergarten. Since then, the forest kindergartens have become increasingly popular. As of 2005 there were approximately 450 forest kindergartens in Germany, some of which offer a mix of forest kindergarten and traditional daycare, spending their mornings in the forest and afternoons inside. By late 2017, the number of forest kindergartens in Germany surpassed 1,500.

In 2009, the Forestry Commission Scotland (FCS) undertook a feasibility study to create a Forest Kindergarten pilot project in Glasgow and the Clyde Valley. This model is based upon empowering early years educators to lead weekly sessions in their local woodland or other greenspace using a child-centred approach. The first FCS Forest Kindergarten 3-day training took place in February 2012. In 2017 the course became a Scottish Qualification Award (SQA) at SCQF Level 7. This Forest Kindergarten training has now been embedded in various Early Years College courses within Scotland and delivered by Learning through Landscapes across the UK. This qualification will soon operate in the rest of the UK under NOCN Accreditation.

Aotearoa New Zealand Enviroschools started in 2001, and often incorporate a Māori perspective, and Australia has bush or beach kinders (kindergartens) that provide an outdoor learning program.

While there are similarities, Forest School and Forest Kindergarten are two distinct training programmes. LtL has produced a useful comparison of Forest Kindergarten and Forest School.

From 2018 on, all forest kindergartens are invited to celebrate the International Day of Forest Kindergarten every year on 3 May.

== Effects ==
The fact that most forest kindergartens do not provide commercial toys that have a predefined meaning or purpose supports the development of language skills, as children verbally create a common understanding of the objects used as toys in the context of their play. Forest kindergartens are also generally less noisy than closed rooms, and noise has been shown to be a factor in the stress level of children and daycare professionals. For inner-city girls, having sight of a green space from home improves self-discipline, while the same effect was not noted for boys in the study as they were more likely to play further from home.

Playing outside for prolonged periods has been shown to have a positive impact on children's development, particularly in the areas of balance and agility, but also manual dexterity, physical coordination, tactile sensitivity, and depth perception. According to these studies, children who attend forest kindergartens experience fewer injuries due to accidents and are less likely to injure themselves in a fall. A child's ability to assess risks improves, for example in handling fire and dangerous tools. Other studies have shown that spending time in nature improves attention and medical prognosis in women (see Attention Restoration Theory). Playing outdoors is said to strengthen the immune systems of children and daycare professionals.

When children from German Waldkindergartens go to primary school, teachers observe a significant improvement in reading, writing, mathematics, social interactions and many other areas. Forest kindergartens have been recommended for young boys, who may not yet demonstrate the same fluency in typical school tasks as their female counterparts, to prevent negative self-esteem and associations with school.

Roland Gorges found that children who had been to a forest kindergarten were above average, compared by teachers to those who had not, in all areas of skill tested. In order of advantage, these were:

Improved skills
Knowledge and skills in specific subjects.
Reading
Mathematics
Constructive contributions to learning
Asking questions and interest in learning
Motivation
Sports
Music
Art and creativity
Positive social behaviour
Religion
Concentration
Handling writing and painting equipment

== Motivation ==
Helicopter parenting is becoming more clearly recognised in the culture of fear of today's risk averse society. While some parents rush to 'wrap their children in cotton wool', others see outdoor play and forest kindergartens as a way to develop a mature and healthy outlook on life, as well as practical skills and health. Doing this at a young age is hoped to bring lifelong benefits to the child. It is consistent with the notions of slow parenting, the "idle parent" and "free range kids".

== See also ==
- Free-range parenting
- German Forest
- Outdoor education
- Urban forest
- Adventure playground
- Helicopter parent
- Slow parenting
- Wandervogel
- Kitafahrten

== Related organisations ==
- American Forest Kindergarten Association, U.S. Forest Kindergarten Model based on the Waldkindergarten and Nordic Models.
- Learning through Landscapes Is a non-profit organisation providing SQA Accredited Forest Kindergarten Awards in the UK.
- Eastern Region Association of Forest and Nature Schools (ERAFANS), a 501(c)3 non-profit organization that offers nature-based professional development to teachers and childcare providers.
- Play England, charity raising awareness of the value of play
- PlayScotland charity encouraging children to play
- Association of all Forest Kindergartens in Czech Republic
- Natural Start Alliance in United States
