= Rachel and Stephen Kaplan =

American psychology professors

Rachel and Stephen Kaplan are professors of psychology at the University of Michigan, specializing in environmental psychology. The Kaplans are known for their research on the effect of nature on people's relationships and health.

== About ==
Their work on "restorative environments" and Attention Restoration Theory influenced how landscape and design professionals and others view humanity's relationship with nature. The Kaplans got involved in studying the effects of nature on people in the 1970s with a US Forest Service grant to evaluate a challenge program in Michigan's wilderness. This introduction went on to influence generations of environmental psychologists and designers.

The Kaplans have found that too much focused attention on anything can lead to mental fatigue and such fatigue's remedy is found in exposure to nature. In order for nature to best work its relaxing effect it is preferable for a place to have a high fascination value. An environment that automatically pulls the viewer into it is most beneficial. The Kaplans' research has found that office workers with a view of nature were happier and healthier at work. Exposure to natural environments of the most mundane sort has proven to lift people's moods and enhance their ability to mentally focus.

Recent research of the Kaplans has also shown that people who exercise by walking outside in pleasant environments tend to walk longer than those who walk inside or around their neighborhoods.

== Bibliography ==
=== Rachel and Stephen Kaplan ===
- Kaplan, Rachel; Stephen Kaplan; Robert L. Ryan (1998). With People in Mind: Design And Management Of Everyday Nature. Washington, DC: Island Press. ISBN 978-1-55963-594-3.
- Kaplan, Rachel; Stephen Kaplan (1989). The experience of nature: A psychological perspective. Cambridge University Press. ISBN 978-0-521-34939-0.
- Kaplan, Rachel; Stephen Kaplan (1982). Humanscape: Environments for People. Ann Arbor, Mich.: Ulrich's Books. ISBN 978-0-914004-49-3.

=== Rachel Kaplan ===
- Kaplan, Rachel (1993). "The role of nature in the context of the workplace" (PDF). Landscape and Urban Planning. 26 (1): 193–201. doi:10.1016/0169-2046(93)90016-7. hdl:2027.42/30542.

=== Stephen Kaplan ===
- Kaplan, Stephan (September 1995). "The restorative benefits of nature: Toward an integrative framework". Journal of Environmental Psychology. 15 (3): 169–182. doi:10.1016/0272-4944(95)90001-2.

== See also ==
- Attention Restoration Theory
