= 2002 California Proposition 49 =

Education law in California, United States

Proposition 49 was a proposition in the state of California on the November 5, 2002 ballot. The official title was "The After School Education and Safety Program Act of 2002." The proposition passed with 3,946,448 (56.7%) votes in favor and 3,023,433 (43.3%) against. It was placed on the ballot through the initiative process. The proposition was heavily pushed and backed by actor Arnold Schwarzenegger, and its passage marked his first political success.

When put on the ballot, the question before voters was:

Should funding for before and after school programs be substantially increased, and starting in 2004-05, should general funds be permanently earmarked for this program?

== Official summary ==
The passing of California Proposition 49:

- Increases state grant funds available for before/after school programs, providing tutoring, homework assistance, and educational enrichment.
- Makes every public elementary, middle/junior high school, including charter schools, eligible for after school grants ranging from $50,000–$75,000. Maintains local funding match requirement.
- Provides priority for additional funding to schools with predominantly low-income students.
- Requires that, beginning 2004–05, new funding for before/after school programs not be taken from education funding, guaranteed under Proposition 98. Gives priority to schools already receiving grants and requires increasing expenditures only if state revenues grow.

== State and Local Government ==
The passing of California Proposition 49 for before and after school programs resulted in an additional annual state costs of up to $455 million, beginning in 2004–05.

Results by county: Yes: 60–70%; 50–60%; No: 60–70%; 50–60%

== See also ==
- List of California ballot propositions 2000-present
