= Attention restoration theory =

Theory that exposure to nature can improve concentration

Attention Restoration Theory (ART) proposes that spending time in natural settings or even viewing natural scenes helps people recover from directed attention fatigue (mental tiredness that occurs when sustaining deliberate focus on tasks). Natural environments often evoke a state known as soft fascination that allows the mind to rest and reflect, supporting later task performance. ART is frequently discussed alongside Stress Reduction Theory (SRT), which emphasizes emotional and physiological stress recovery; together they describe complementary pathways through which nature may benefit wellbeing.

Within ART, Stephen and Rachel Kaplan argue that directed attention is often taxed in stimulating modern environments. Soft fascination facilitates restoration and involves effortless attention on gentle, interesting stimuli in the environment, similar to mind-wandering but still directed outward. Soft fascination contrasts with hard fascination, which fully captures attention and affords little reflective capacity. The Kaplans also describe four properties that together characterize a restorative setting: being away (psychological or physical distance from routine demands), extent (sufficient scope and coherence to invite exploration), compatibility (a good fit between what the setting affords and the person's purposes), and fascination (interest without effort). Common examples of what encourages soft fascination include watching clouds drift, leaves rustle, or water flow. Hard fascination examples include sporting events, thrilling movies, and video games.

== History of ART ==
Attention in ART draws on William James' distinction between voluntary and involuntary attention. James defined voluntary attention as effortful, deliberate, goal-oriented focus, and involuntary attention is automatic and is captured by engaging stimuli. The Kaplans extended these ideas to nature exposure, first noting natural settings provide stimuli that engage involuntary attention during a study assessing the psychological benefits to gardening. ART is often positioned alongside the Biophilia Hypothesis which argues for humans' innate connection with nature. The Biophilia Hypothesis, rooted in evolutionary psychology, proposes that humans have an innate, evolutionarily shaped tendency to seek connections with the natural environments. The affinity for nature thus could stem from a survival-based instinct to seek suitable environments with enticing features related to landscape, animals, and plant life.

Following the introduction of ART, Roger Ulrich put forth a competing theoretical nature framework known as Stress Reduction Theory (SRT). SRT claimed that nature-related benefits were not in fact due to cognitive benefits but, instead, emotional and physiological responses. In his early, influential work, he demonstrated how subjects recovered from a stressful state faster and, subjectively, felt better when watching a video of nature compared to urban scenes. Cognitive benefits were proposed to be a side effect of feeling better emotionally and physiologically. Kaplan later highlighted the benefits of viewing ART and SRT as complements. He argued both theories described distinct but interconnected processes and, by integrating them, researcher can more fully account for the benefits of exposure to natural environments. Building on these theoretical connections, newer work argues that feeling mentally refreshed and emotionally calmer happen together because the same mind–body system, linked through the vagus nerve, helps drive both.

== Empirical Evidence ==
While many individual studies have assessed the effects of nature, systematic reviews and meta-analyses better summarize the overall state of psychology research on nature. Beginning with the ART-connected cognitive benefits of nature, one review highlighted the diversity of measurement assessments used—looking at Backwards Digit Span, Trail Making Test B, and Stroop to name a few. Here, positive results were only found for three out of thirteen tasks assessing different aspects of cognition. A later review categorized used cognitive measures and established that areas of executive attention and working memory see the greatest, most consistent effects. Alerting and basic attention are less consistent by comparison. To clarify these domains: executive attention refers to the ability to manage conflict, inhibit distractions, and maintain focus on goals. Working memory involves holding and manipulating information over short periods of time. Alerting attention refers to readiness in responding to incoming stimuli. Basic attention refers to a more rudimentary vigilance and general ability to focus. Not only did this study refine measurement practices, but it also argued for reduced task variance and encouraged better research practices moving forward. More recent reviews thus become more useful, such as one 2025 meta-analysis assessing the effect of exposure duration. These researchers reported that benefits were more consistent for exposures lasting 30 minutes or longer and highlight diminishing returns or the decreased comparable benefits seen in longer exposure periods. Additionally, people who spent at least two hours in nature over the past week (no matter whether all at once or in shorter visits) were noticeably more likely to feel healthy and well, with benefits leveling off after about 200–300 minutes

Beyond cognition, reviews of health-related outcomes have become more refined over the years. One earlier review combined results from randomized and non-randomized studies to reveal small, but consistent short-term benefits to mood and affective wellbeing following nature exposure. Like with cognition however, the diversity of measures and study designs make this conclusion harder to accept as a takeaway message. A more recent review advanced this understanding with Nature-Based Interventions (NBIs) which include various nature practices such as forest bathing (Japanese Shinrin-Yoku), horticulture, and guided nature walks. They found that nature effects depended on other variables like the intervention type, delivery format, sensory richness, and social context and further call for clearer taxonomies or organizing structures in nature research.

== Mechanisms ==
Research attempts to uncover the driving mechanism behind why we see nature effects with some summarizing ideas around the Default Mode Network (DMN). The DMN represents a network as a synchrony between different brain regions and one that is engaged during involuntary attention processes like mind-wandering. Within ART, the DMN is highlighted as the potential mechanism because it supports the reflective, internally focused thought present during soft fascination that, in turn, facilitates the recuperation of directed attention resources. Research on other potential mechanisms suggests that nature exposure may reduce rumination (repetitive, often negative thinking about one's problem's) and dampen activity in a mood-related brain region, which could help explain observed stress and affective benefits. Separate investigation explores the role of an enhanced immune system—suggesting contact with nature strengthens immune functioning through physiological processes. Overall, more research is needed to clarify the mechanisms that support nature-related effects within both ART and SRT frameworks.

== Applications ==
=== Greenspace ===
Greenspace specifically refers to natural space or the incorporation of natural elements in predominantly urban settings. In studying these effects, one meta-analysis synthesized large-scale cohort and experimental evidence that commonly utilized satellite-determined "greenness" as a measure of greenspace. Results varied in effect size and statistical significance, but overall suggested an association between long-term residential greenspace and better cognitive functioning. Attention and working memory, similar to what is previously discussed, showed the strongest evidence for effects. The variety of methods and definitions makes it difficult to draw firm conclusions about psychological mechanisms. At the same time, this work encourages further research on issues such as proximity to greenspace or differences in cognitive health.

=== Education ===
Nature in education is generally defined under two approaches: passive engagement (through windows for example) and active engagement (outdoor learning or play time). A systematic review showed that, while active engagement sustains benefits longer, both incorporations can improve children's and adolescents' learning outcomes. Reports consistently found evidence for restored attention and improvement in working memory tasks as well as some evidence for improvements in areas of reading, mathematics, and classroom engagement. The authors also note the strongest outcomes appeared when interventions were repeated as opposed to being a one-off exposure.

=== Workplace ===
A systematic review of nature interventions in the workplace synthesized research on employees in office-based settings including corporate workspaces, healthcare organizations, and academic institutions. The review found incorporating nature was generally associated with improved mental health outcomes such as stress reduction, mood, and perceived wellbeing. Evidence for productivity gains and physiological outcomes was less consistent as results for blood pressure and cortisol failed to agree. The authors interpreted the overall evidence as supporting the presence of nature-related benefits in workplace settings, while noting methodological limitations.

=== Healthcare ===
Following the pattern of reviews, another such paper was published investigating the role of therapeutic hospital gardens and related interventions in healthcare settings. Studies took the form of small-scale qualitative reports and controlled trials. The researchers concluded nature exposure consistently reduced patient stress, enhanced mood, and improved satisfaction with care. Staff outcomes were considered in some of the studies, where employees reported on their own experiences of respite and reduced burnout when they had access to gardens or green spaces within the hospital setting. The review importantly highlights design features such as accessibility, sensory richness, and integration with everyday hospital routine as moderators of effectiveness. Overall, the researchers concluded that including nature features in hospitals may benefit patients and staff, although definitions of "nature" varied across studies.

=== Virtual Nature ===
Virtual nature includes images, videos, panoramic scenes, and virtual reality simulations of natural environments and is often proposed as a practical, scalable alternative to in-person settings. Several studies have demonstrated how immersive VR scenes of natural environments can still increase perceived restorativeness, positive affect, and aspects of attention. One recent meta-analysis more selectively looked at virtual nature effects with students in higher education. Findings collectively indicate virtual nature exposure improved mental health and wellbeing outcomes (e.g., reductions in negative affect and stress, increase in positive affect). Effects are moderated by immersion quality (e.g., utilizing flat screens or head mounted displays), exposure duration, and the realism of the nature content. One aspect virtual nature has in common with real nature is again the wide variety of methods, however, a more novel question in the comparison between real and virtual nature continues to be researched.

== Limitations of Nature Research ==
Despite conclusions favoring the persistence of positive effects following nature exposure, the diversity in methods remains a challenge for the field moving forward. Returning to an early review, researchers are aware of issues in defining nature as well as addressing the file-drawer problem, meaning that studies with non-significant results are less likely to be published. Other issues include potential confounds, such as exercise and social interaction, difficulty keeping nature and non-nature clearly separated in control conditions, and the moderating role of individual and cultural differences.

== See also ==
- Attention span
- Attentional retraining
- Ecopsychology
- Environmental psychology
- Green exercise
- Nature deficit disorder
- Outdoor education
