= Attention span =

Time spent concentrating before being distracted

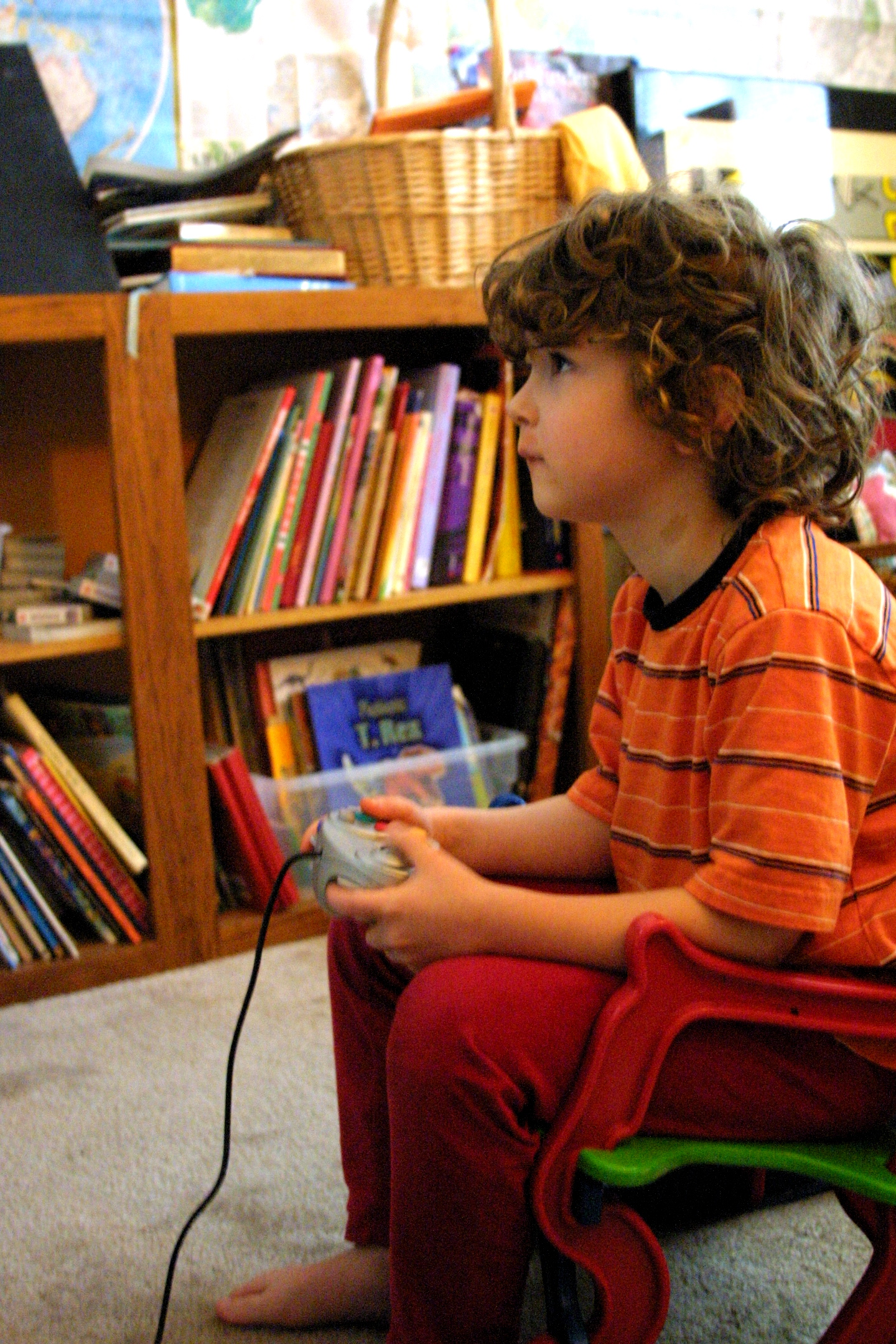
A young boy concentrating on playing a video game while sitting in a chair.

Attention span is the amount of time spent concentrating on a task before becoming distracted. Distractibility occurs when attention is uncontrollably diverted to another stimulus or sensation. In cognitive psychology, attention span is generally divided into transient attention, a short-term physiological response to stimuli, and sustained attention, which involves the voluntary maintenance of goal-directed focus over extended periods. Sustained attention relies on executive function and working memory, which permit the engagement of complex analytical tasks such as structured education and long-term problem solving.

Attention span can vary significantly along the human lifespan, as it increases through childhood and adolescence alongside prefrontal cortex development. It tends to peak in middle adulthood, and gradually declines in older age. Attention span is also influenced by intrinsic motivation, the task's difficulty, fatigue, and environment. Modern research aims to focus on the relationship between media consumption, such as social media and short-form video media, and cognitive focus while studying how such interfaces can modify visual attention quality and distractibility in academic and daily settings.

== By age ==
Measuring attention span depends on what the attention is being used for. The duration for which an individual is able to maintain attention depends on factors such as the task difficulty, motivation, and any potential distractions. The terms "transient attention" and "selective sustained attention" are used to separate short term and focused attention. Transient attention refers to a short-term response to a stimulus that temporarily attracts or distracts attention. Thus, why researchers distinguish between different aspects of attention rather than just focusing on attention span as a single fixed measurement.

Focused attention is the level of attention that produces consistent results on a task over time. Common estimates of the attention span of healthy teenagers and adults range about 5 hours. This is possible because people can choose repeatedly to re-focus on the same thing. This ability to renew attention permits people to "pay attention" to things that last for more than a few minutes, such as lengthy films.

Older children are capable of longer periods of attention than younger children.

For time-on-task measurements, the type of activity used in the test affects the results, as people are generally capable of a longer attention span when they are doing something that they find enjoyable or motivating. Attention is also increased if the person is able to perform the task fluently, compared to a person who has difficulty performing the task, or to the same person when they are just learning the task. Fatigue, hunger, noise, and emotional stress can all reduce the amount of focus used on the task.

A research study that consisted of 10,430 males and females ages 10 to 70 observed sustained attention time across a lifespan. The study required participants to use a cognitive testing website where data was gathered for seven months. The data collected from the study concluded that attention span is not one singular linear equation; at age 15 it is recorded that attention-span-related abilities diverge. Over the course of the study, collected evidence additionally found that, in humans, attention span is at its highest level when a person is in their early 40s, then gradually declines in old age.

== Measurement ==
Many different tests on attention span have been used in different populations and in different times. Some tests measure short-term, focused attention abilities (which is typically below normal in people with ADHD), and others provide information about how easily distracted the test-taker is (typically a significant problem in people with ADHD). Tests like the DeGangi's Test of Attention in Infants (TAI) and Wechsler Intelligence Scale for Children-IV (WISC-IV) are commonly used to assess attention-related issues in young children when interviews and observations are inadequate. Older tests, like the Continuous Performance Test and the Porteus Maze Test, have been rejected by some experts. These tests are typically criticized as not actually measuring attention, being inappropriate for some populations, or not providing clinically useful information.

Variability in test scores can be produced by small changes in the testing environment. For example, test-takers will usually remain on task for longer periods of time if the examiner is visibly present in the room than if the examiner is absent.

== Testing the effect on different types of media ==
In an early study of the influence of temperament on attention span, the mothers of 232 pairs of twins were interviewed periodically about the similarities and differences in behavior displayed by their twins during infancy and early childhood. The results showed that each of the behavioral variables (temper frequency, temper intensity, irritability, crying, and demanding attention) had a significant inverse relationship with attention span. In other words, the twin with longer attention span was better able to remain performing a particular activity without distraction, and was also the less temperamental twin.

One study of 2600 children found that early exposure to television (around age two) is associated with later attention problems such as inattention, impulsiveness, disorganization, and distractibility at age seven. This correlational study does not specify whether viewing television increases attention problems in children, or if children who are naturally prone to inattention are disproportionately attracted to the stimulation of television at young ages, or if there is some other factor, such as parenting skills, associated with this finding.

Another study examining the relations between children's attention span-persistence in preschool and later academic achievements found that children's age four attention span-persistence significantly predicted math and reading achievement at age 21 after controlling for achievement levels at age seven, adopted status, child vocabulary skills, gender, and maternal education level. For instance, children who enrolled in formal schooling without the ability to pay attention, remember instructions, and demonstrate self-control have more difficulty in elementary school and throughout high school.

In another study involving 10,000 children (ages eight to 11), fluctuations in attention span were observed during the school day, with higher levels of attention in the afternoon and lower levels in the morning. The study also found that student awareness and productivity increased after a two-day weekend but substantially decreased after summer break.

The rise of short-form videos has been exponential, with platforms such as TikTok, Instagram, and Facebook Reels having the attention of everyday individuals. These platforms have given new information on the way the public consumes media and the effect it has on attention span. A study was done in 2024 that found that students who consistently watch short-term videos struggle with memory-based academic work. The study was done by researchers collecting data using a survey and a digital attention test to study how social media would affect their habits, the way they use social media, and how their grades are affected by it. The survey asked about the daily usage, the student GPA, and their usual concentration struggles. The students averaging around 3 hours of screen time and with a 2.8 GPA, had a significantly shorter attention span, with heavy users having slower reaction times and being more prone to making errors in their academic life. Due to the nature of short-form videos, the brain of the students got used to the constant stimulation of the videos and quick content switches. In conclusion, this article shows evidence of the damage of short-form videos and the correlation between short-form videos and undergraduate students' academic performance.

Platforms that offer such content are designed for the focus to keep the consumer engaged with the content, with a very accurate algorithm that tailors to your content preferences. Studies that have been made on such technology report that the different social media layouts, which are matrix, masonry, and linear, have varying effects. Matrix layouts have an impact on the consumer's attention span by increasing attention but reducing focus duration. In contrast, linear layouts enhance sustained attention but limit scope, and masonry layouts offer a middle ground of the three layouts. These layouts influence the visual attention quality (VAQ), which measures how these designs maintain the user focus and engagement compared to fragmented viewing. These experiments illustrate how certain media might affect users' attention span by the type of layout users are exposed to.

Another study was done through a validated questionnaire. While it does not show major effect on one's attention span, it creates a useful tool to extract information for future research, as it proved itself to be useful when questioning patients.

Although the research done on social media has shown to decrease attention span, not all forms of media have the same impact on the public. For example, video games do not stray too far from short-term videos. Studies were made to test different types of video game genres and the impact on people that play them. They made a group of four: action games, sports simulator games, RPG games, and those who do not play games. What they gathered from their research was that the people did not differ too much in attention span, but they concluded that the people that played games and those who did not showed some variation. The studies found that more hours spent playing action games correlated with better visual attention, as they had better coordinator when playing such genres with those playing sport simulators having similar results.

== See also ==
- Attention
- Attention deficit hyperactivity disorder (ADHD)
- Attention restoration theory
- Attention economy
- Flow
- Hyperfocus
- Mindfulness
- Subliminal stimuli
