= Generation Jones =

Cohort born from 1954 to 1965

Generation Jones is the generation or demographic cohort between the Baby Boomers and Generation X. The term was coined by American cultural commentator Jonathan Pontell (b. 1958), who has argued that the term refers to a distinct generation born from 1954 to 1965.

Media coverage of Generation Jones has typically described it as a distinct generation, using Pontell's dates of 1954 to 1965. Others see this as a subset of the Baby Boom Generation, namely its second half. A third view is that Generation Jones is a cusp or micro-generation between the Boomers and Xers. Dictionary.com defines Generation Jones as "members of the generation of people born in the Western world between the mid-1950s and the mid-1960s".

The name "Generation Jones" has several connotations, including a large anonymous generation, a "keeping up with the Joneses" competitiveness, and the slang word "jones" or "jonesing", meaning a yearning or craving resulting from the huge expectations left unfulfilled in this generation's transition from the economic boom of the 1960s to the souring economy of the 1970s.

== Characteristics ==
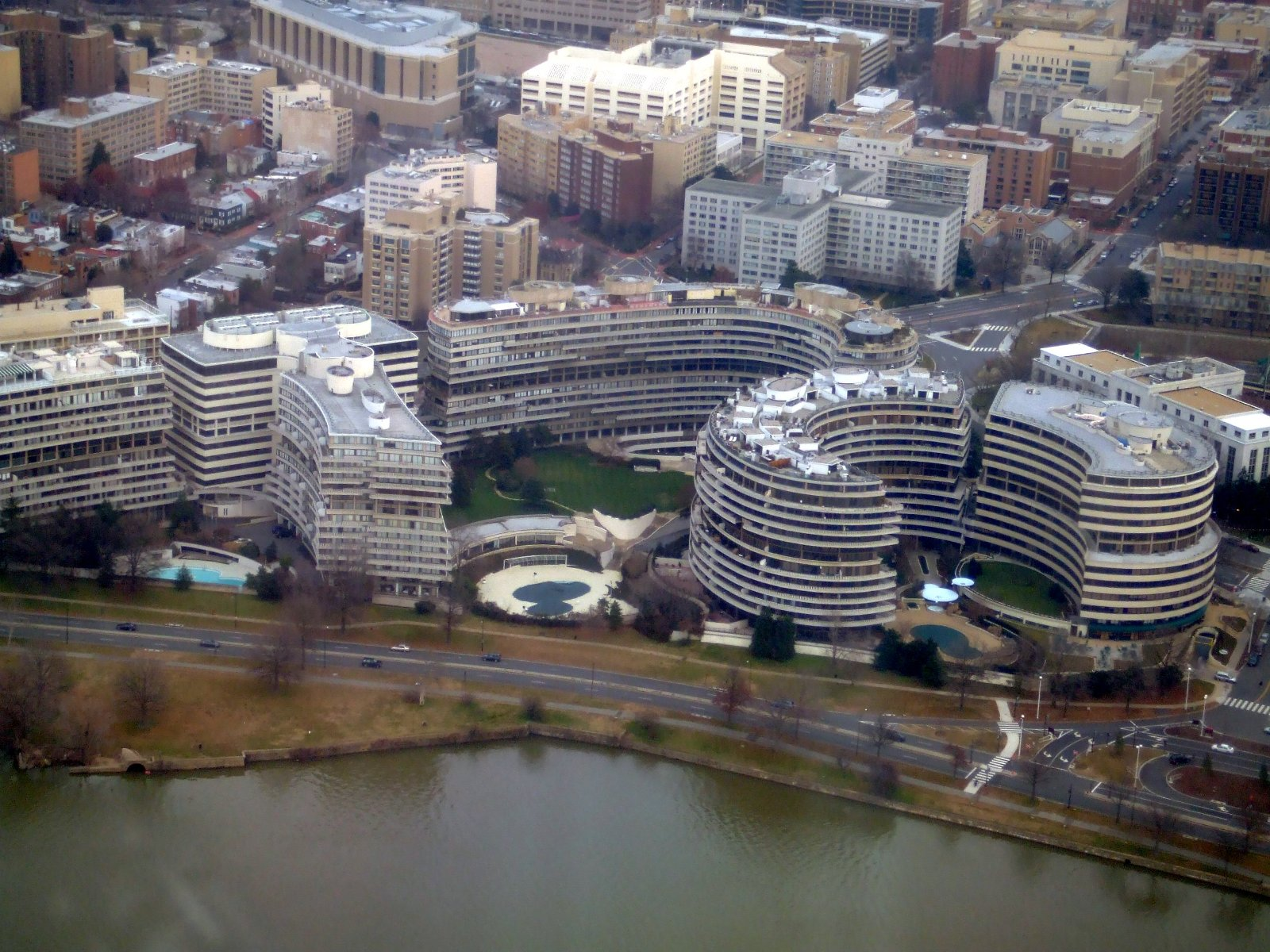
The Watergate scandal in 1972 was a formative political event for Generation Jones, contributing significantly to their characteristic distrust of government and general cynicism.

In 2009, Jonathan Pontell wrote in an article for Politico: "We Jonesers have long been lumped with Boomers simply because we arrived during the same long post-Second World War spike in births. But generations arise from shared formative experiences, not headcounts, and the two groups evolved with dramatic differences. Our background is just as distant from Generation Xers'."

While older Boomers (or "Leading-Edge Boomers") participated in the social changes of the 1960s and early 1970s, Generation Jones (or "Trailing-Edge Boomers") were still children. Unlike older Boomers, most Jonesers, particularly younger ones, did not have World War II veterans as parents (although some were Korean War veterans). Many Jonesers' parents were the Silent Generation, sandwiched between the Greatest Generation and the Baby Boomers.

As Jonesers reached adulthood, the United States military draft and involvement in the Vietnam War had ended; thus, they had no defining political cause, as opposition to the war was for the older Boomers. The Woodstock music festival (1969) was a defining moment for older Boomers, whereas Jonesers tend to remember the Watergate scandal (1972–74) and the cultural cynicism it begat. While in high school, members of Generation Jones felt they had just missed the real hippie era. Key characteristics assigned to members are pessimism, distrust of government, and general cynicism.

Generational trends expert Daniel Levine, director of the Avant Guide Institute, suggests Generation Jones bridges the gap between Boomers and Gen X, taking some of the idealism of its elder counterparts and the pragmatism of the generation after them. He also said, "It comes down to identity. Fact is, most Jonesers simply don't feel like Boomers", and "taking into account the year a person was born only gives us part of the picture. We should also look at the shared cultural experiences people gain as they came of age."

Authors Hannah Ubl, Lisa Walden, and Debra Arbit said that, because Baby Boomers is a huge generation spanning almost two decades, it can be helpful to break it into separate subgroups: Early Boomers and Generation Jones. They say the "latter group's formative years occurred after the counterculture movement of the 1960s. They weren't witnesses to the electric and inspiring atmosphere that JFK, Martin Luther King Jr., and Gloria Steinem created for Early Boomers. Instead, their world was marked by competition, limited resources as fuel prices rose, and...disco."

In 2014, Richard Pérez-Peña wrote in The New York Times: "we aren't what people usually have in mind when they talk about boomers. They mean the early boomers, the postwar cohort, most of them now in their 60s—not us later boomers, labeled 'Generation Jones' by the writer Jonathan Pontell. The boom generation really has two distinct halves, which in my mind I call Boomer Classic and Boomer Reboot. The differences between them have to do, not surprisingly, with sex, drugs and rock 'n' roll—and economics and war." In 2020, Jennifer Finney Boylan wrote in The New York Times: "we might be grouped with the baby boomers, but our formative experiences were profoundly different. If the zeitgeist of the boomers was optimism and revolution, the vibe of Gen Jones was cynicism and disappointment. Our formative years came in the wake of the 1973 oil shock, Watergate, the malaise of the Carter years and the Reagan recession of 1982."

Alfred Lubrano wrote in The Philadelphia Inquirer: "A generation hidden within a generation, Generation Jones is a term social commentators affix to younger, tail-end boomers—people who came of age in the disco-, punk-, and Watergate-obsessed 1970s, not the hippie-spawning; Vietnam War-protesting; sex, drugs, and rock-and-roll 1960s. Jonesers resent being lumped in with flower-power boomers. They believe they share few traits and cultural touchstones with a noisy cohort that overshadowed them."

Larry Edelman, writing for The Boston Globe and identifying as a Gen Joneser, said of his generation: "too young for Woodstock, too old to identify with Gen X. Pop culture reference points: the Clash, 'Happy Days,' and 'Star Wars: A New Hope.'" He added: "I may be a 'young Boomer,' but I feel dated in a newsroom increasingly staffed by millennials and Gen Z. That said, with that age comes perspective. Growing up in Generation Jones meant facing some of the same challenges my younger colleagues now see: economic downturns, political disillusionment, and the uneasy balance between idealism and practicality."

Mark Wegierski wrote in The American Conservative, "the term 'cusper' is proposed to apply to a category of persons sometimes identified as 'the tail-end of the Baby Boom' or 'the first wave of Generation X.' These would be persons born roughly between 1958–1967 'on the cusp' of massive societal change, falling somewhere between Baby Boomers and Generation X in many of their social and cultural traits." He added, "the cuspers were children, not teenagers in the 1960s, and for many of them, the counterculture 'revolt against the elders' was highly disconcerting, and not a badge of shared identity. The cuspers were typical teenagers in the 1970s, and they listened to second generation rock-n-roll—punk and progressive rock. They grew up with Clint Eastwood westerns like The Outlaw Josey Wales and dystopian sci-fi like Soylent Green and Rollerball."

For The Post, Julie Jacobson wrote that sociologist and Massey University professor emeritus Paul Spoonley "is sympathetic to the early-later generational split, but sees few major differences in the cultural attitudes or social and economic circumstances of Boomers. If a division was needed, Spoonley suggests a more pertinent one would be a 'cusp generation', confined to those born in the years 1960–1964." According to Spoonley, "the important difference comes as this cusp generation has different experiences as they reach adulthood, especially in relation to getting a job and then moving through the labor market. There is good evidence to show that getting into the labor market during a downturn, such as the 1990s, has lifelong impacts on promotion or salary."

Hamline University political science professor David Schultz, co-author of the book Generational Politics in the United States From the Silents to Gen Z and Beyond, has said, "we have a lot of evidence that there really is a divide between the older Baby Boomers and the younger Baby Boomers", adding, "Trump's early Boomer cohort came of age during the Vietnam War, witnessed the assassinations of John and Robert Kennedy, Malcolm X and Martin Luther King Jr., partied through the Summer of Love and Woodstock and watched men walk on the Moon. The [Kamala] Harris age group's influences included gas lines, Watergate, the Iranian hostage crisis, Saturday Night Live, and MTV."

Author John A. Zukowski wrote that Gen Jones is "a generation in a no-man's-land between the hippie and the yuppie."

In a 2026 Forbes article, Vibhas Ratanjee wrote: "Open any generational workforce analysis. You'll find: Baby Boomers (1946-1964), Generation X (1965-1980), Millennials (1981-1996). The framework looks comprehensive until you realize it groups a 62-year-old and an 80-year-old into the same category and calls them both 'Boomers.' Someone born in 1948 came of age during actual prosperity. They got jobs, pensions, affordable housing, economic expansion. Someone born in 1960 absorbed those same promises during childhood, then entered adulthood during stagflation, oil crises, mass layoffs, and the systematic dismantling of lifetime employment. Shared label. Fundamentally different formative experiences."

In The New Yorker, Bruce Handy wrote: "When the first boomers were toddlers, TV was a novelty. We, the late boomers, were weaned on "Captain Kangaroo" and "Romper Room." They were old enough to freak out over the Sputnik; we were young enough to grow bored of moon landings." He also wrote: "the idea of generations with well-defined beginnings and endings, like Presidential terms or seasons of "American Horror Story," is inherently silly, of course. Generations are more like sequential schmears, overlapping and messy, and the idea that each one shares essential traits is perhaps a marketer's version of astrology. Still, these divisions would be slightly less dubious if crafted more artfully, and, with that in mind, I have a proposal: let's split the baby boom in half and dub those of us born between 1956 and 1964 the 'Dazed and Confused' generation, after Richard Linklater's quasi-autobiographical teen movie".

=== Economic dimensions ===
Pontell suggests that Jonesers inherited an optimistic outlook as children in the 1960s but were then confronted with a different reality as they entered the workforce, in the case of the United States, during the economic struggles of the 1970s and 1980s. Mortgage interest rates increased to above 12% in the mid-1980s, making it virtually impossible to buy a house on a single income.

Generation Jones is noted for coming of age following a huge swath of older Boomers from the earlier part of the Baby Boom Generation; many note that Jonesers had a paucity of resources and privileges compared to earlier Baby Boomers. For example, early Baby Boomers quickly glutted the available senior and more lucrative employment positions vacated by retiring Greatest Generation and older Silent Generation members, leaving Jonesers with fewer opportunities until their older Boomer siblings retire, only slightly before Jonesers retire. Jonesers thus feel a certain bitterness and "jonesing" while waiting for the scraps of affluence granted to older Boomers to arrive, mostly after the first tranche of early Baby Boomers clear out.

A study by the Center for Retirement Research at Boston College concluded that younger Boomers have significantly less wealth than older Boomers: "Late Boomers were in their 40s during the Great Recession, and this economic calamity appears to have hit them particularly hard. Their employment rate—that is, the percentage of individuals working—dropped sharply. More importantly, the percentage of the cohort working did not rebound as the economy recovered."

Thomas Byrne, associate professor at the Boston University School of Social Work, found that late baby Boomers in their early 60s were 1.4 times as likely to be homeless as people who had reached that age a decade earlier and twice as likely as those two decades ahead. He said, "it continues to be really unlucky to have been born in the latter half of the baby boom generation".

While many Generation Jones members have retired, most are still "barreling toward" retirement, according to David Yamada, a law professor at Suffolk University. Yamada said many Jonesers "face a coming retirement-savings crisis. I'm very concerned what later life will look like for them."

According to Loyola University Chicago sociologist Rhys Williams, "This generation will be kept working longer".

=== Political activity ===
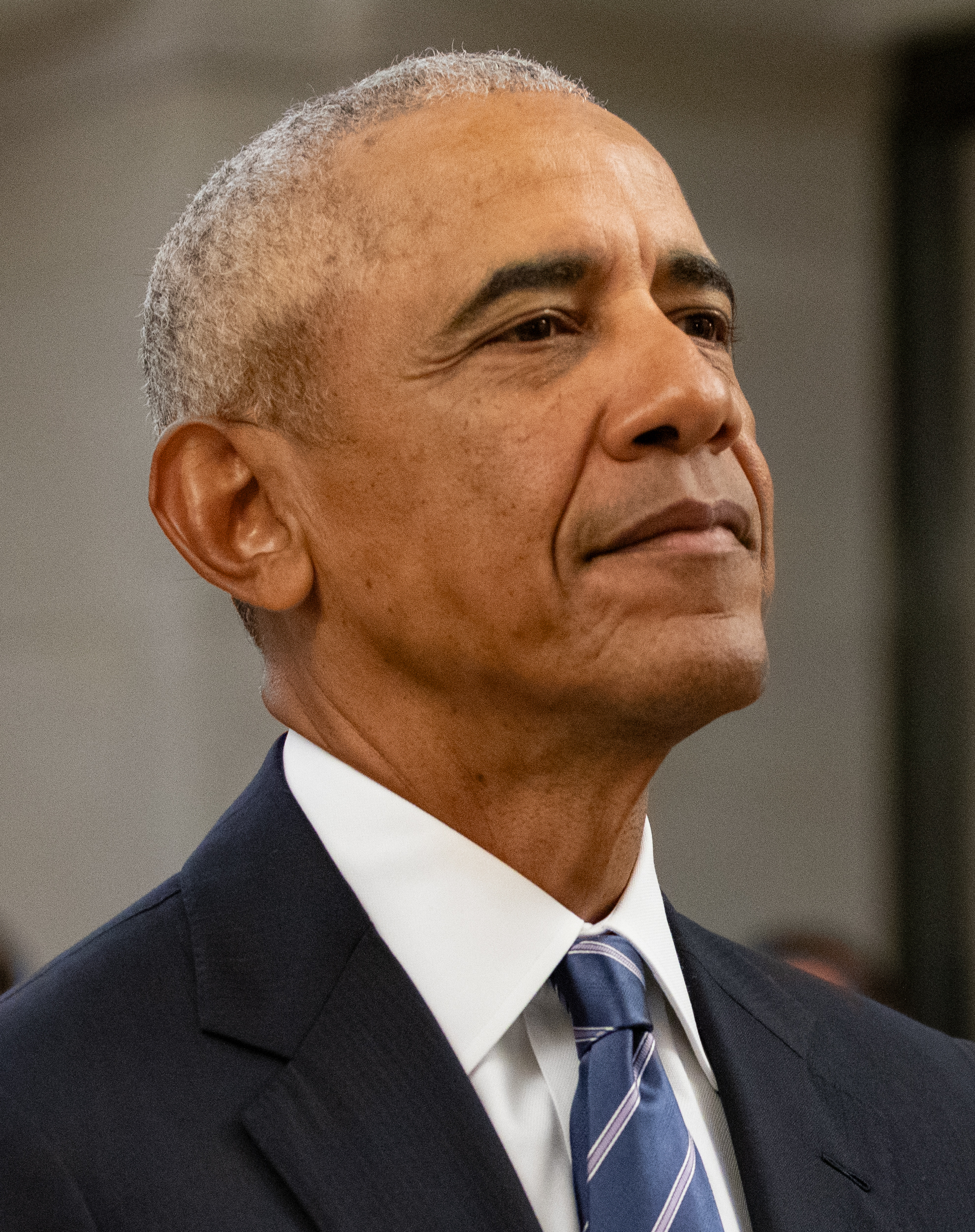
Barack Obama (b. 1961) is widely considered a prominent member of Generation Jones, and his presidency marked a significant generational shift.

Politically, as twentysomethings, many of these cuspers voted for Ronald Reagan in 1980 and 1984. In Canada, Jonesers voted for Progressive Conservative candidate Brian Mulroney in 1984 and 1988, though his Prime Ministership from 1984 to 1993 proved an intense disappointment to many of them. The older, white cuspers were among Donald Trump's biggest fans in 2016.

Politically, Generation Jones has emerged as a crucial voting segment in US and UK elections. In the U.S. 2006 congressional and 2004 presidential elections and the 2005 U.K. elections, Generation Jones's electoral role was widely described as pivotal by the media and political pollsters. In the 2008 U.S. Presidential election, Generation Jones was again seen as a key electoral segment because of the high degree to which its members were swing voters during the election cycle. Influential journalists like Clarence Page and Peter Fenn singled out Generation Jones voters as crucial in the campaign's final weeks. Numerous studies have been done by political pollsters and publications analyzing Jonesers' voting behavior.

In Pontell's opinion, US Jonesers shifted left in 2020, which he attributed to President Donald Trump's response to the COVID-19 crisis, as well as Trump's mocking of President-elect Joe Biden's senior moments: "There are lots of seniors out there that also have senior moments. They don't really like the president mocking those one bit."

According to Geetika Chhatwal, writing for Kadence International, Gen Jonesers' political views are generally moderate to progressive, concerned with economic and social issues, while Baby Boomers tend to be more conservative, with a focus on economic stability and national security.

== Cultural exposure ==
Members of Generation Jones

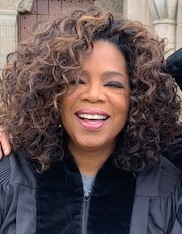
Oprah Winfrey (b. 1954)

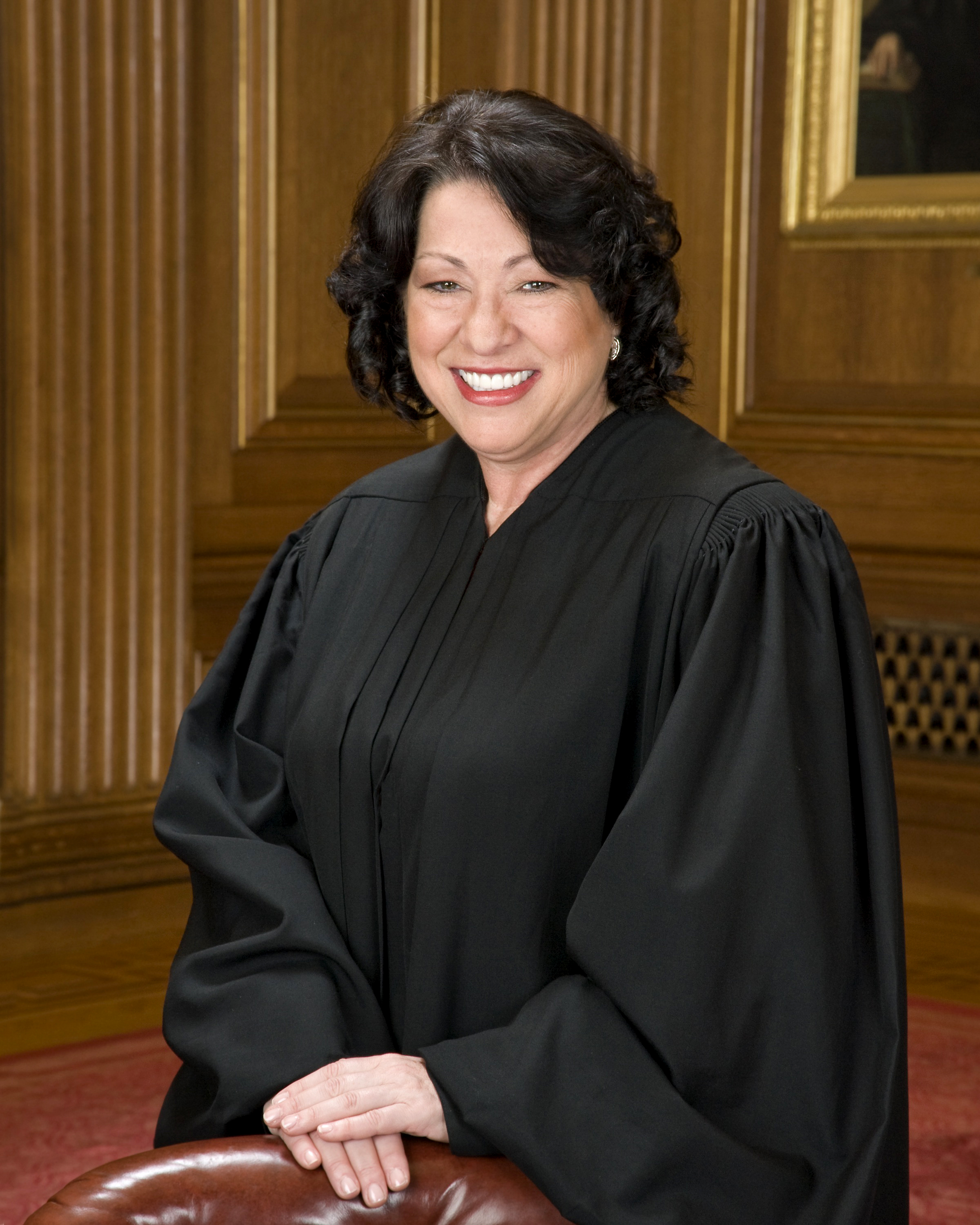
Sonia Sotomayor (b. 1954)

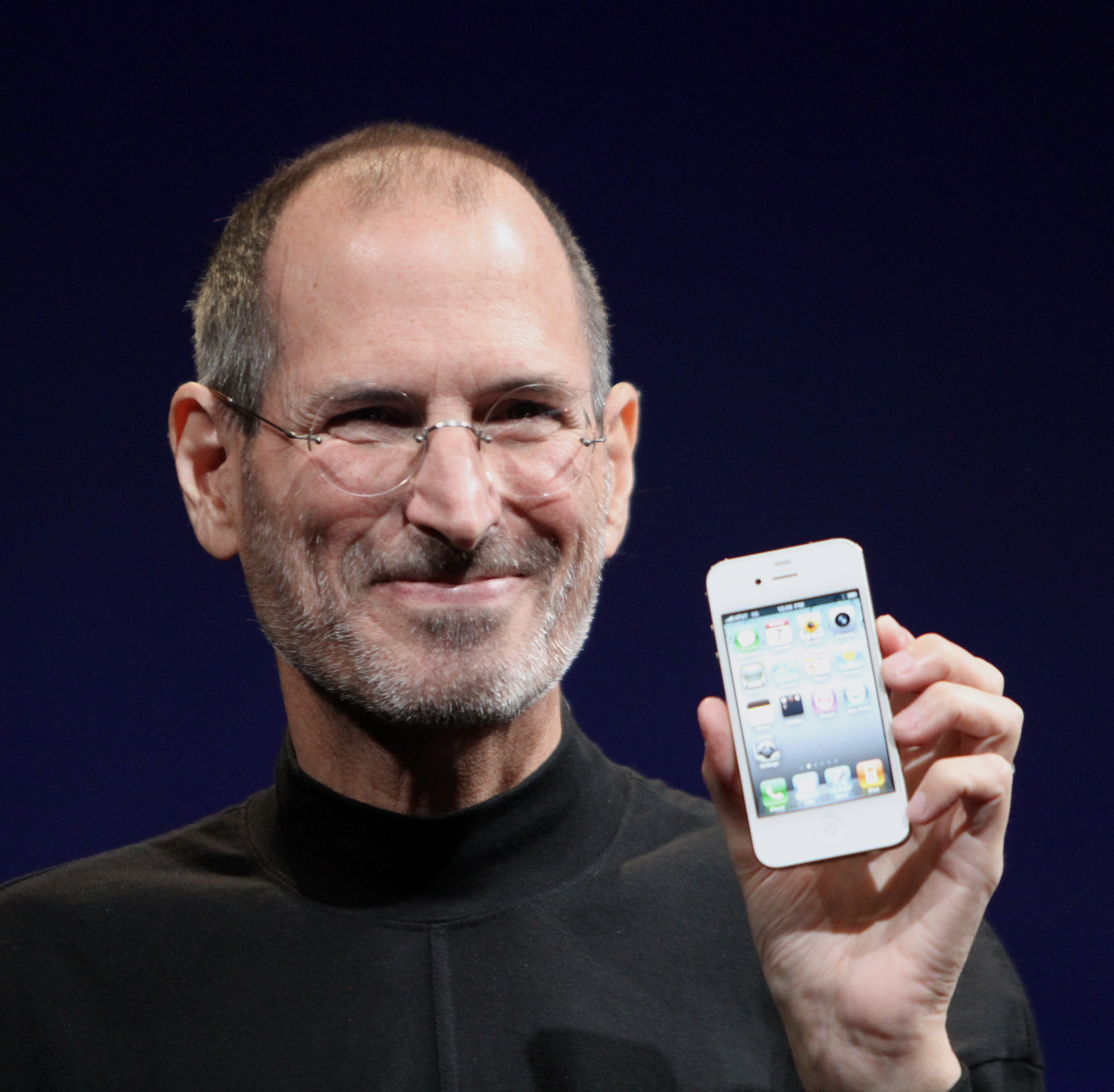
Steve Jobs (1955–2011)

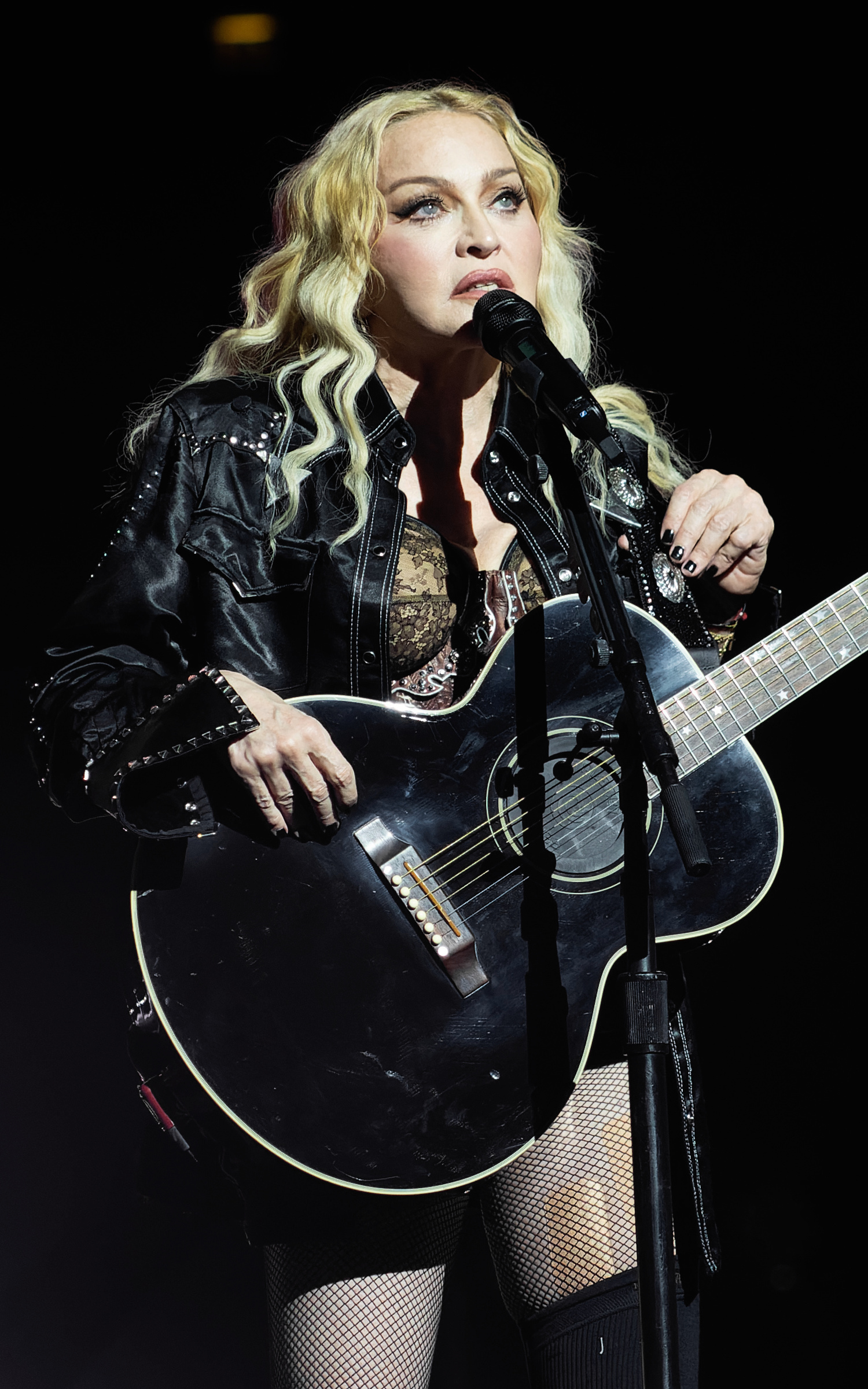
Madonna (b. 1958)

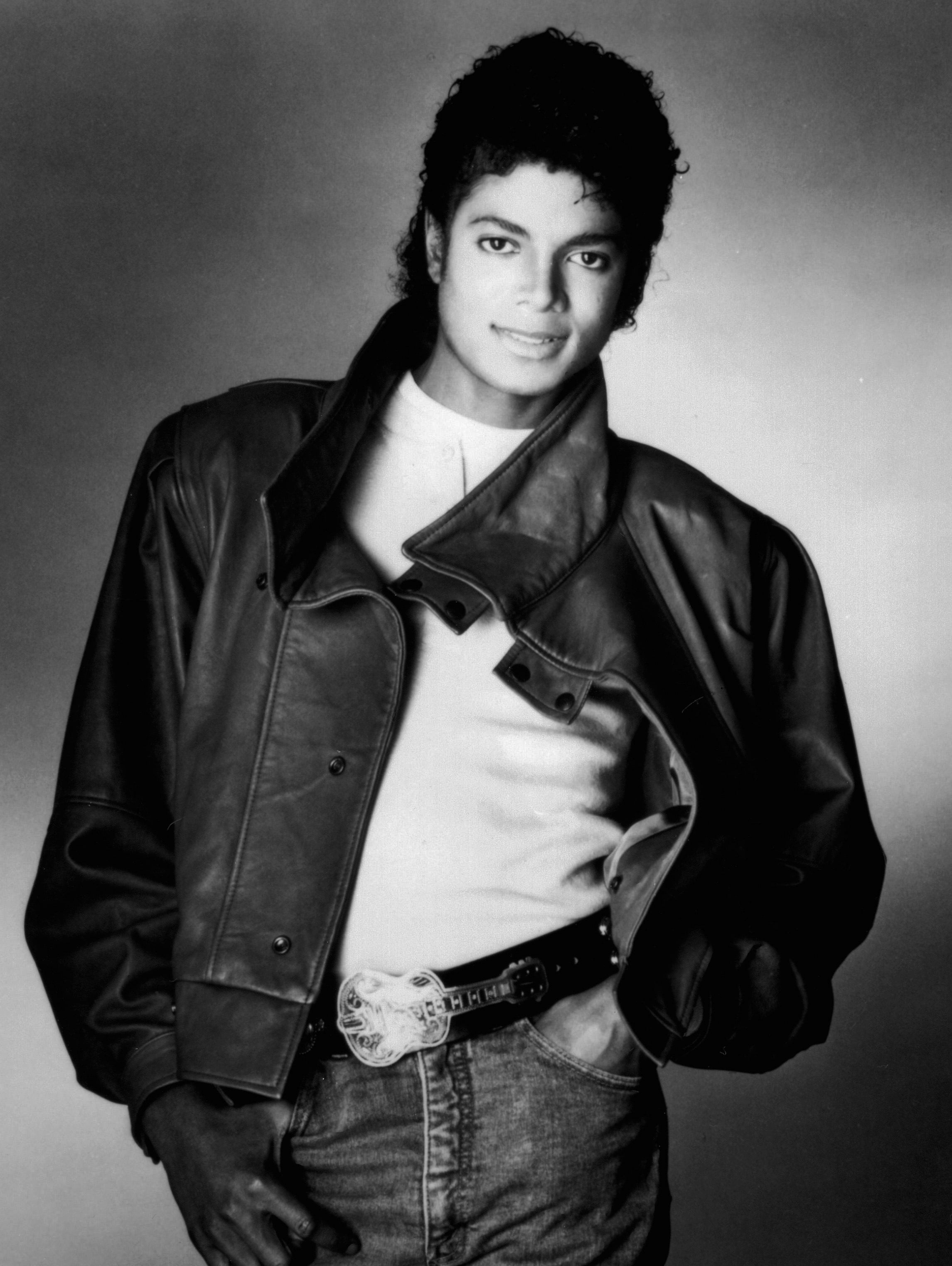
Michael Jackson (1958–2009)

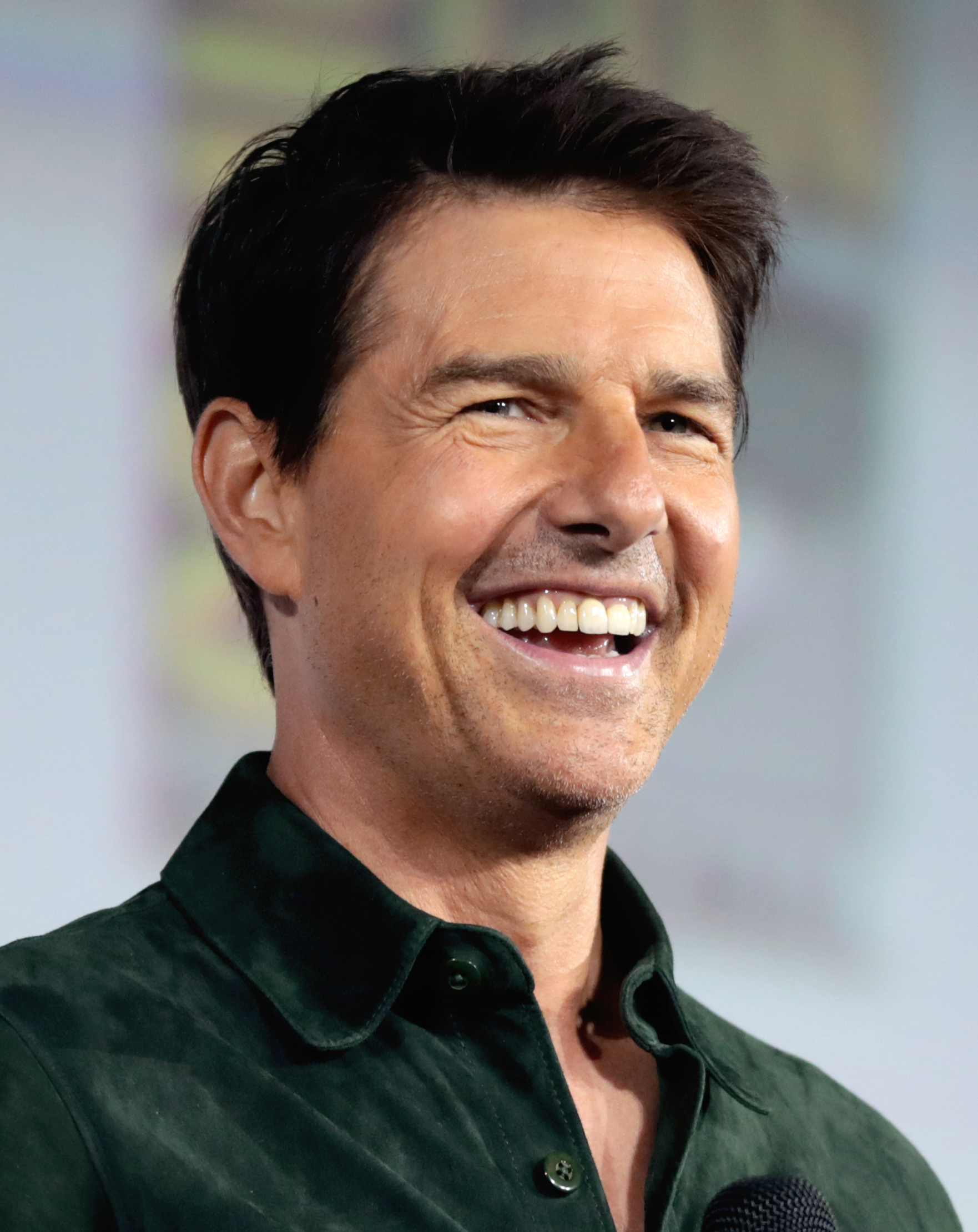
Tom Cruise (b. 1962)

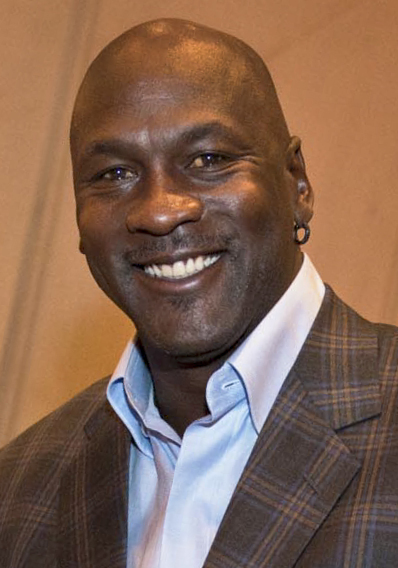
Michael Jordan (b. 1963)

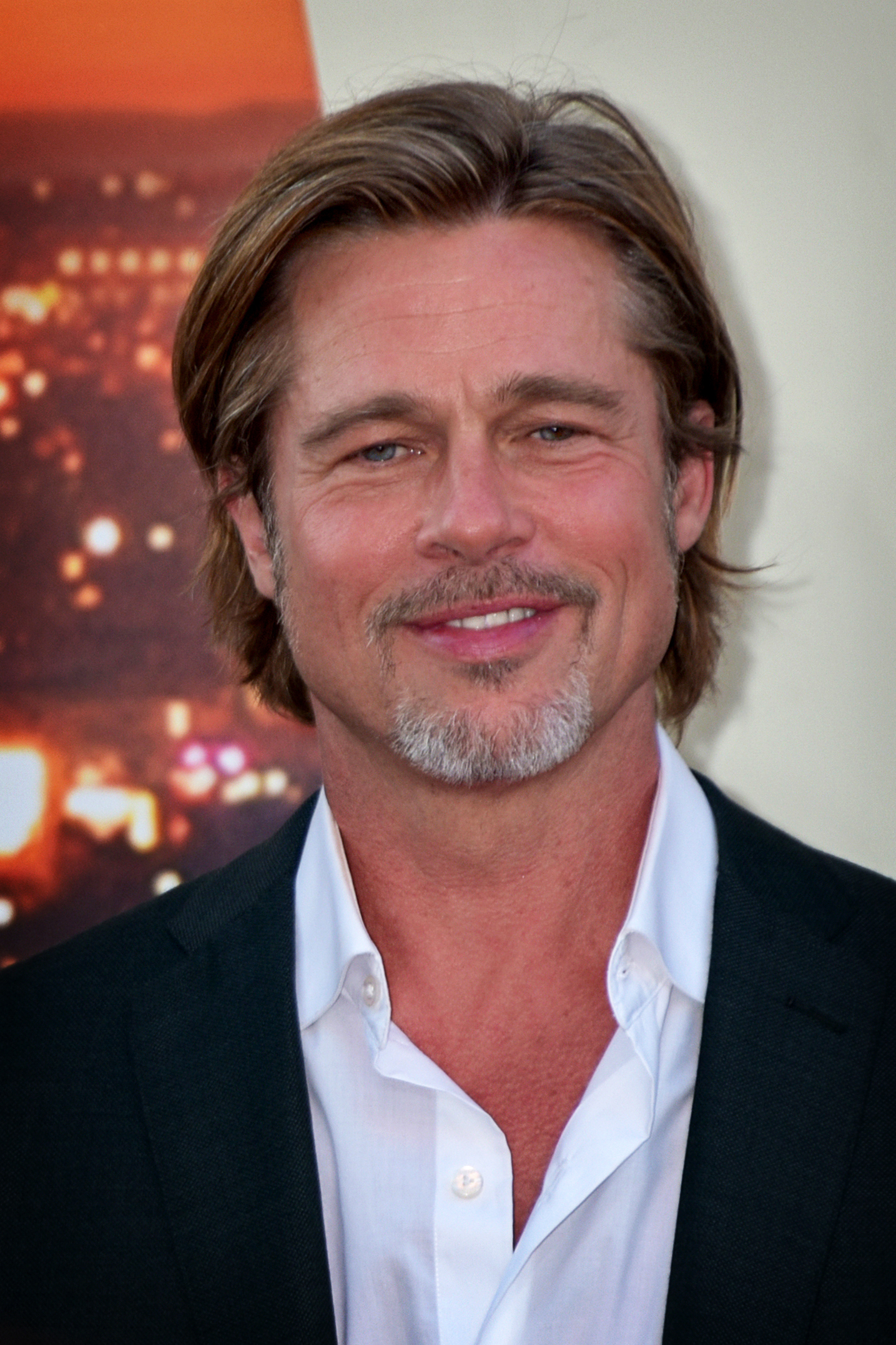
Brad Pitt (b. 1963)

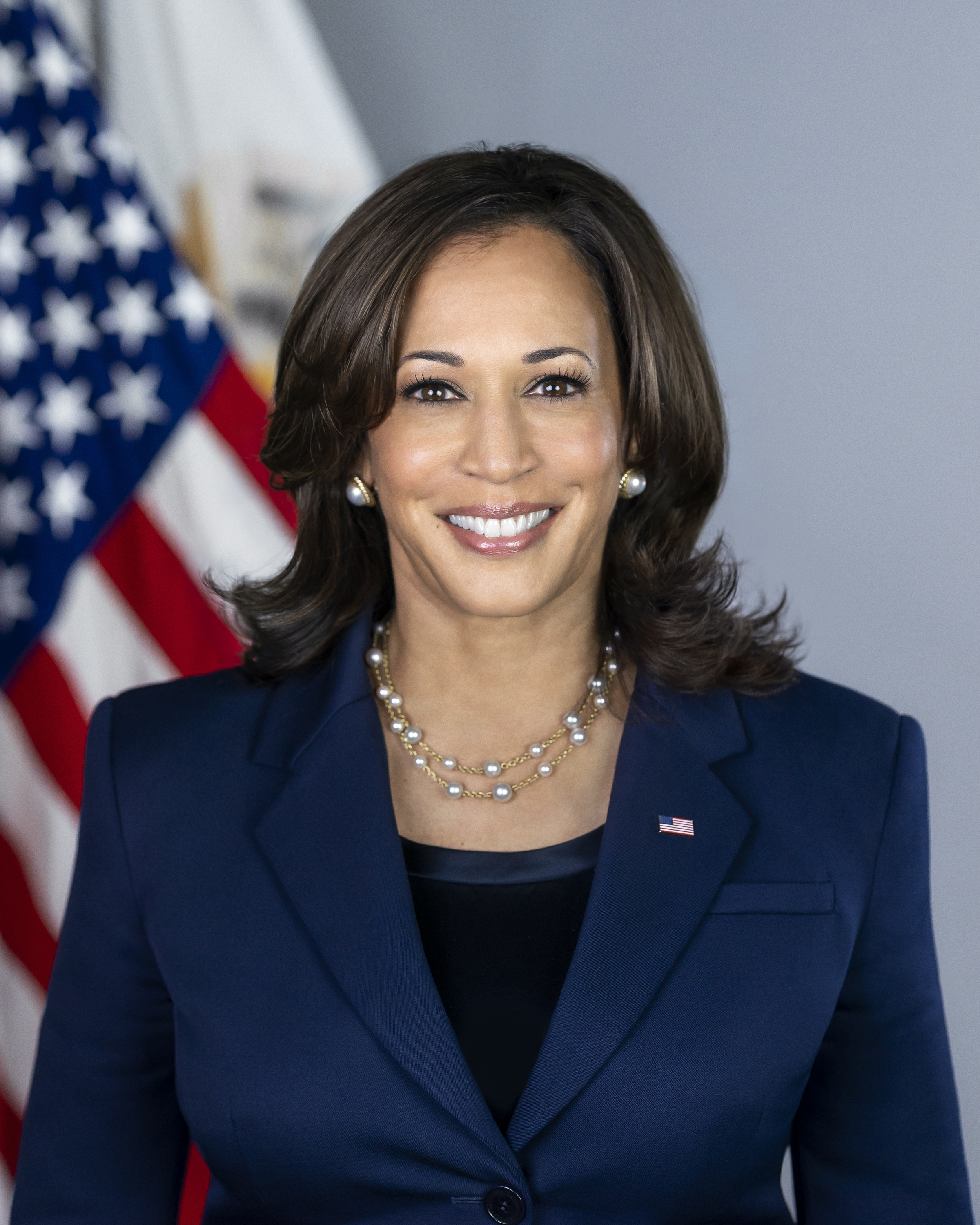
Kamala Harris (b. 1964)

Generation Jones has been covered and discussed in newspapers, magazines, TV, and radio shows. Pontell has appeared on TV networks such as CNN, MSNBC, and BBC, discussing the cultural, political, and economic implications of this generation's emergence. Douglas Coupland (b. 1961), author of Generation X: Tales for an Accelerated Culture, has said the novel (whose characters were born in the late 1950s and early '60s) is about "the fringe of Generation Jones which became the mainstream of Generation X." In the business world, Generation Jones has become a part of many companies' and industries' strategic planning, particularly in the context of targeting Jonesers through marketing. Carat UK, a European media buying agency, has done extensive research into Generation Jones consumers.

The 2008 United States presidential election brought more media attention to Generation Jones. Democrat Barack Obama and Republican vice-presidential nominee Sarah Palin (b. 1964) were on the tickets. Many journalists, publications, and commentators at this time called Obama a member of Generation Jones, including Jonathan Pontell, who said Obama is "a walking, living prime example of Generation Jones. He's a classic practical idealist. It's not the naive idealism of the '60s." Obama has said he does not relate to Boomers. He told an interviewer for The Atlantic in 2007, "When I think of Baby Boomers, I think of my mother's generation. And you know, I was too young for the formative period of the '60s civil rights, sexual revolution, Vietnam War. Those all sort of passed me by." Former first lady Michelle Obama (b. 1964) and former Ambassador Caroline Kennedy (b. 1957) are also of that generation. During the 2020 United States presidential debates, Teresa Wiltz, writing for Politico, said of Kamala Harris: "At age 55, the child of intellectuals in Northern California, she's part of a cohort often ignored by demographers, Generation Jones, those of us who came of age during the Reagan years." She also called Vice President Mike Pence, "another (older) Joneser".

Bruce Handy wrote in The New Yorker that film director Richard Linklater agreed with him about the idea of shaving off a new generation: "I was born in '60, graduated in 1979, so I never felt like much of a Boomer. I feel a little offended being lumped in with someone who's born in 1946. I'm, like, Wow, we grew up in a whole different world. What are you talking about?"

== See also ==
- Cusper
- Interbellum Generation
- Me generation
- Xennials
- Zillennials
- Zalphas
