= Xennials =

Cohort born during the late 1970s to early 1980s

Xennials, also called Xillennials, are a social cohort encompassing people born on the cusp of or during the later years of Generation X and the early years of the Millennials generation.

Many researchers and popular media use birth years from 1977 to 1983, though some extend this further in either direction. Xennials are described as having had an analog childhood and a digital young adulthood. Xennials are almost exclusively the children of baby boomers and came of age during a rapidly changing period that was the 1990s.

In 2020, Xennial was added to the Oxford Dictionary of English. It was added to the Oxford English Dictionary in 2021:

Xennial, n. and adj.: "A person born between the late 1970s and early 1980s, after (or towards the end of) Generation X and before (or at the beginning of) the millennial generation, and typically regarded as exhibiting characteristics of both of these generations"

== Etymology and birth years ==
Xennials is a portmanteau blending Generation X and Millennials to describe a "micro-generation" or "cross-over generation" of people born between the mid- to late 1970s and the early to mid-1980s. Other terms, such as the Star Wars Generation, the Oregon Trail Generation, and Generation Catalano have been proposed.

Xennials was coined by freelance writer Sarah Stankorb in a September 2014 article in GOOD magazine by Stankorb and then-GOOD Magazine staff writer Jed Oelbaum. Good has called Xennials "a micro-generation that serves as a bridge between the disaffection of Gen X and the blithe optimism of Millennials."

Dan Woodman, a professor of social and political sciences at Melbourne University in Australia, said he "inadvertently" helped popularise the term Xennial when journalist Rachel Curtis asked him whether it would make sense to cut the generations differently. Xennials received additional attention after a viral June 2017 Facebook post by Mashable.

Writer Anna Garvey coined the term "Oregon Trail Generation" in her 2015 article "The Oregon Trail Generation: Life Before and After Mainstream Tech", published on Social Media Week (Adweek), to describe people who played the educational computer game The Oregon Trail as children before the internet was widespread.

In Slate magazine, Doree Shafrir coined "Generation Catalano", a reference to the character Jordan Catalano in the 1994-95 teen drama My So-Called Life. She defined "Generation Catalano" as those born from 1977 to 1981.

In 2017, The Guardian wrote, "In internet folklore, xennials are those born between 1977 and 1983, the release years of the original three Star Wars films." In Business Insider, Marleen Stollen, Gisela Wolf, Shana Lebowitz, and Allana Akhtar defined Xennials as people who don't feel like Generation Xers or Millennials and were born between 1977 and 1985. Author Dan Russell used the same birth years to define Xennials.

In his 2025 book Generationally Speaking: How to Bridge the Generation Gap and Communicate with Confidence, Alastair Greener defines Xennials as those born between 1979 and 1982. Authors Hannah Ubl, Lisa Walden, and Debra Arbit define Gen X/Millennial cuspers as those born between 1976 and 1982.

== Characteristics and traits ==
Notable Xennials

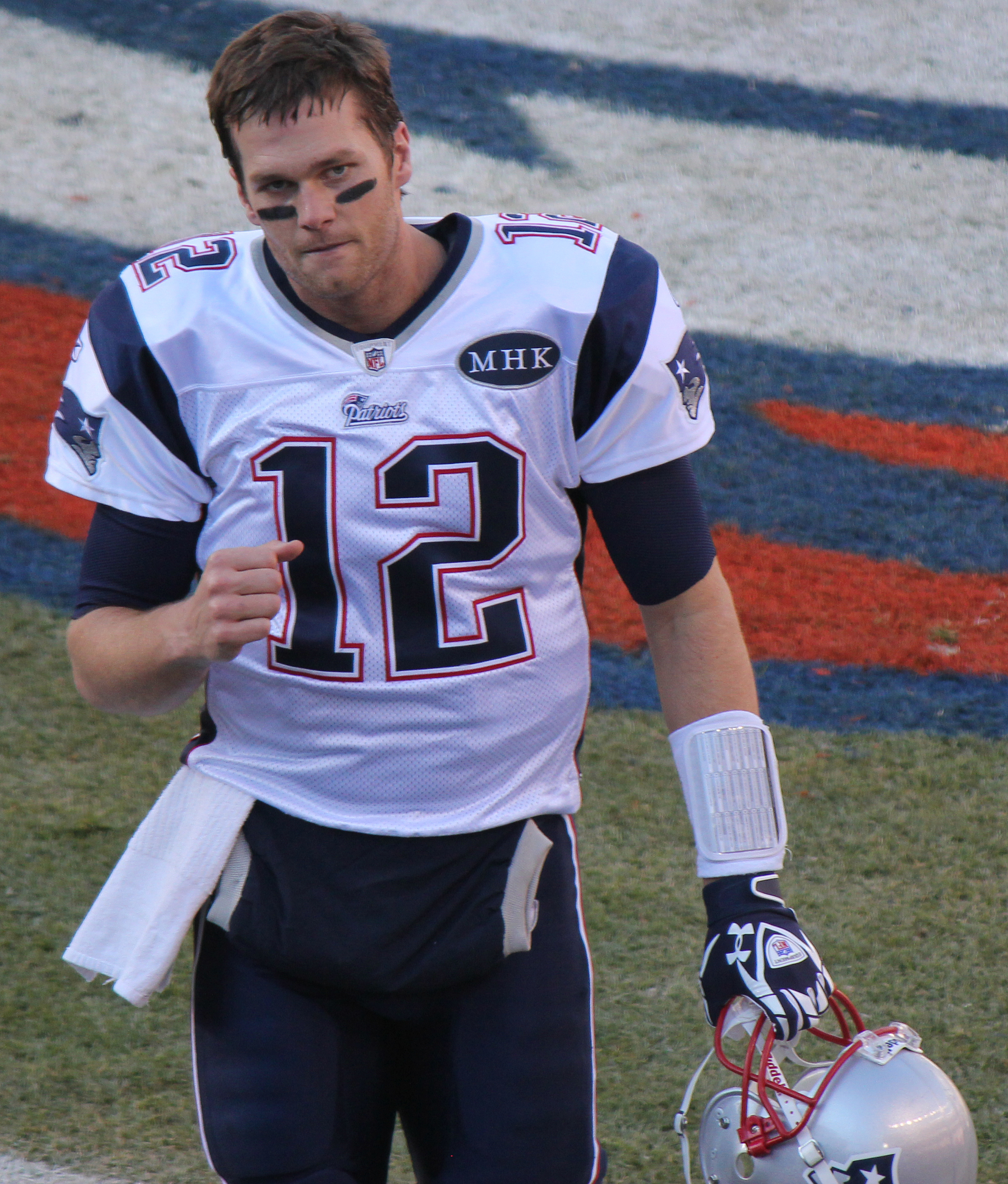
Tom Brady (b. 1977)

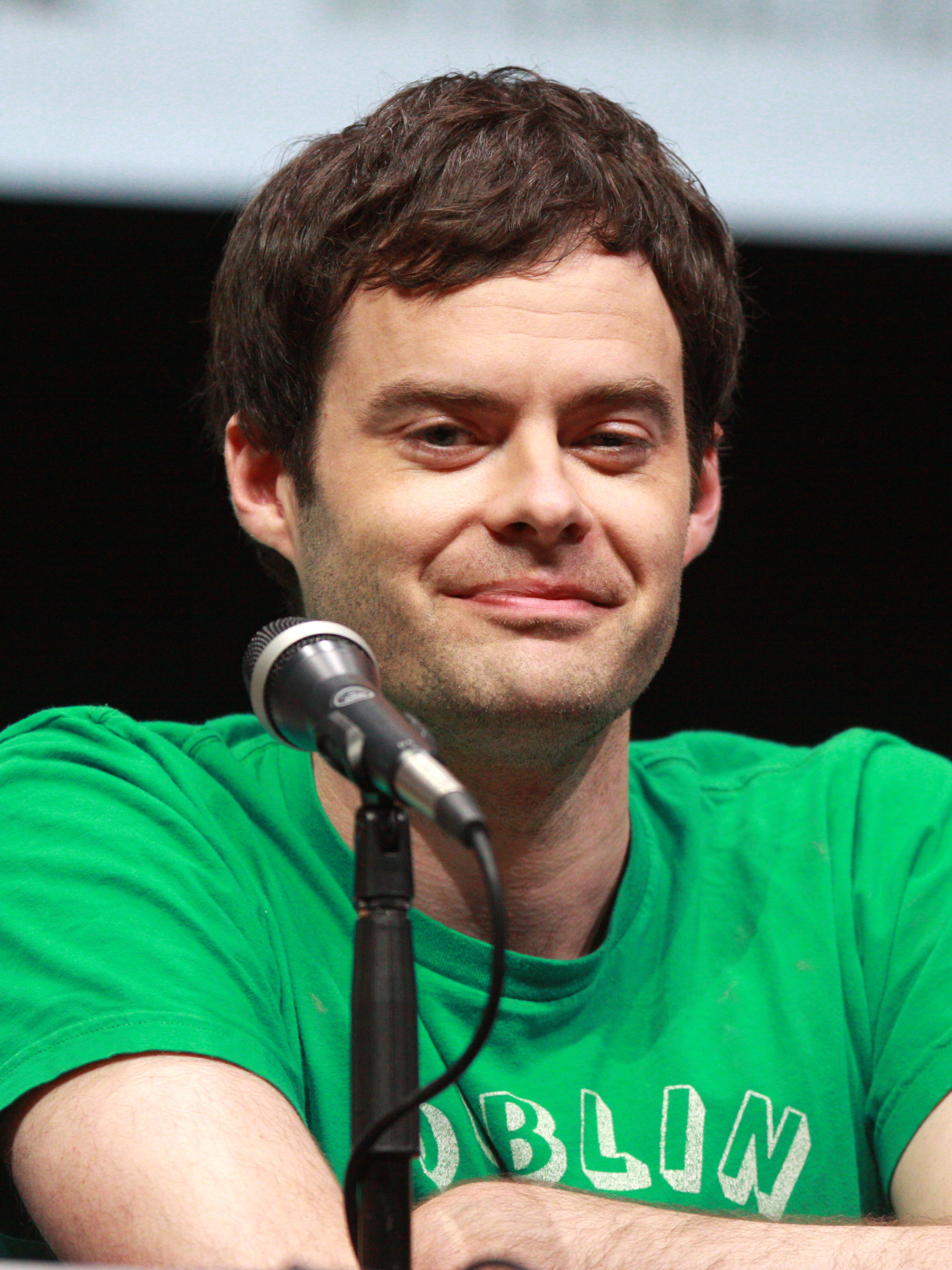
Bill Hader (b. 1978)

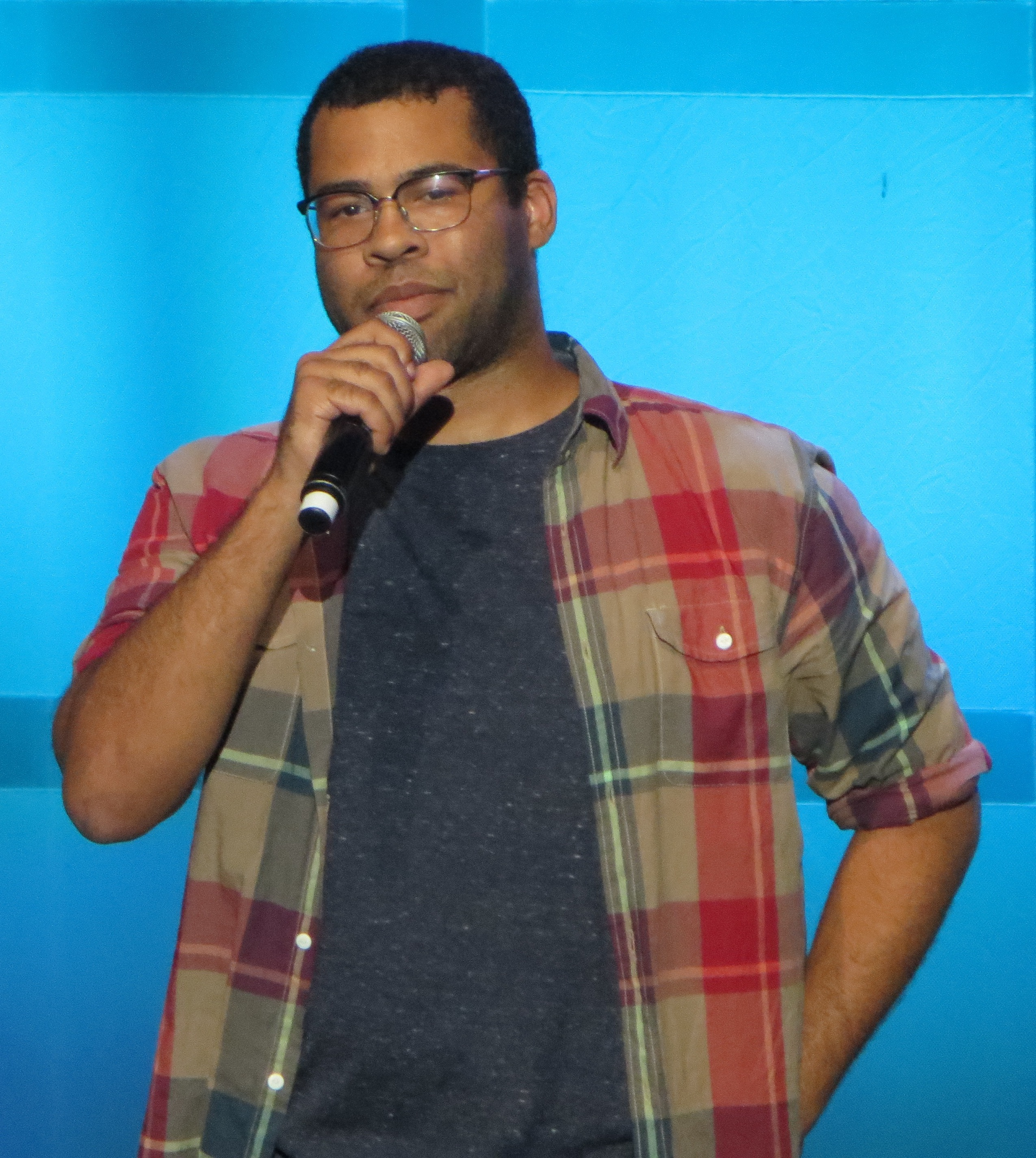
Jordan Peele (b. 1979)

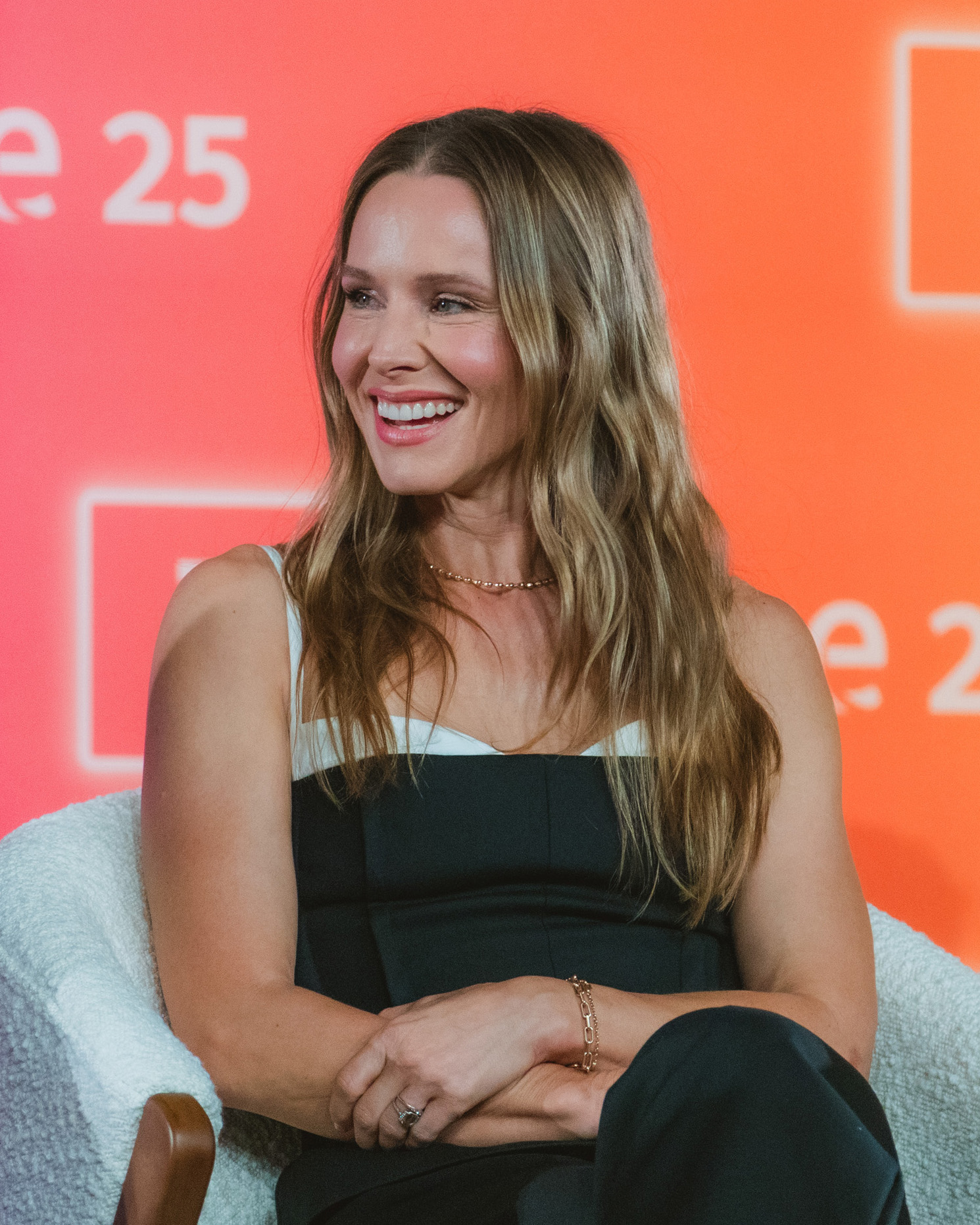
Kristen Bell (b. 1980)

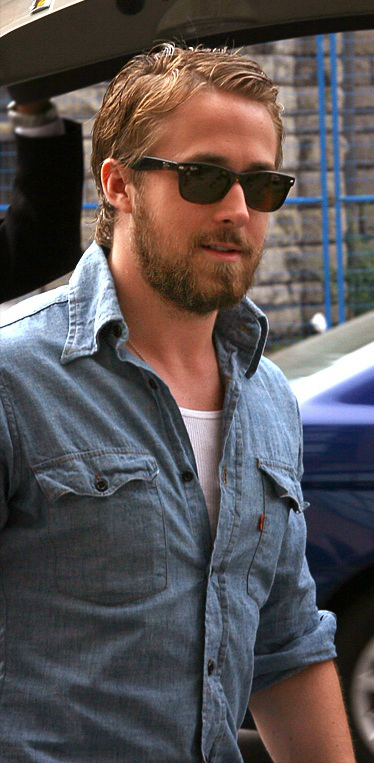
Ryan Gosling (b. 1980)

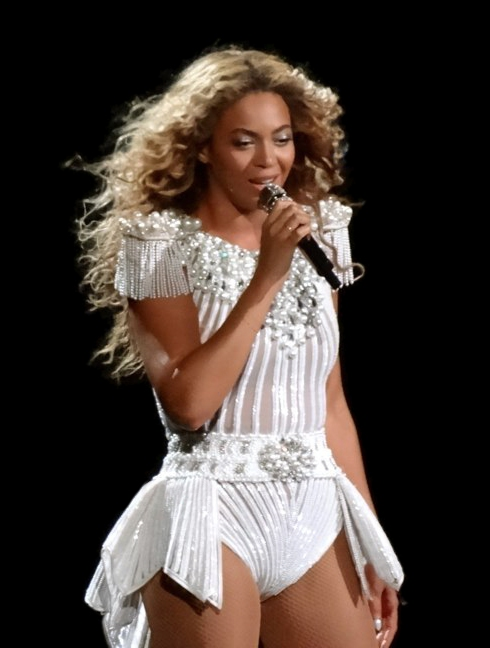
Beyoncé (b. 1981)

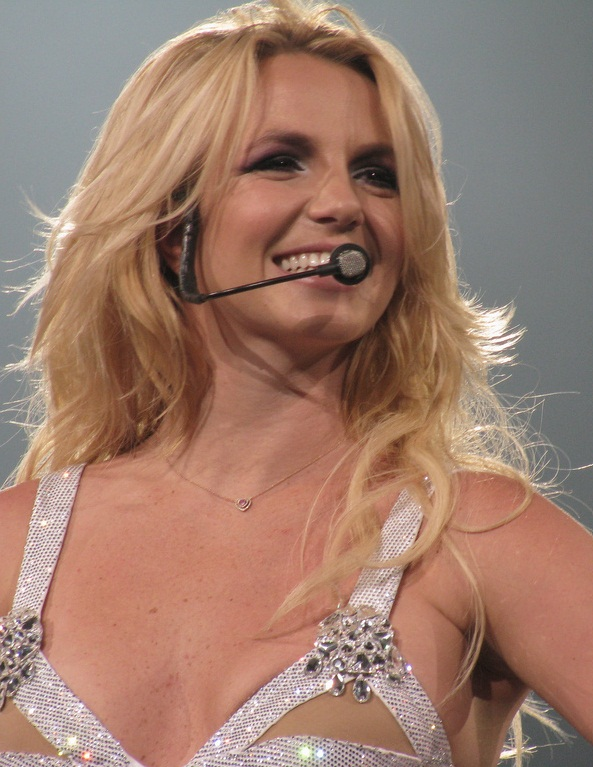
Britney Spears (b. 1981)

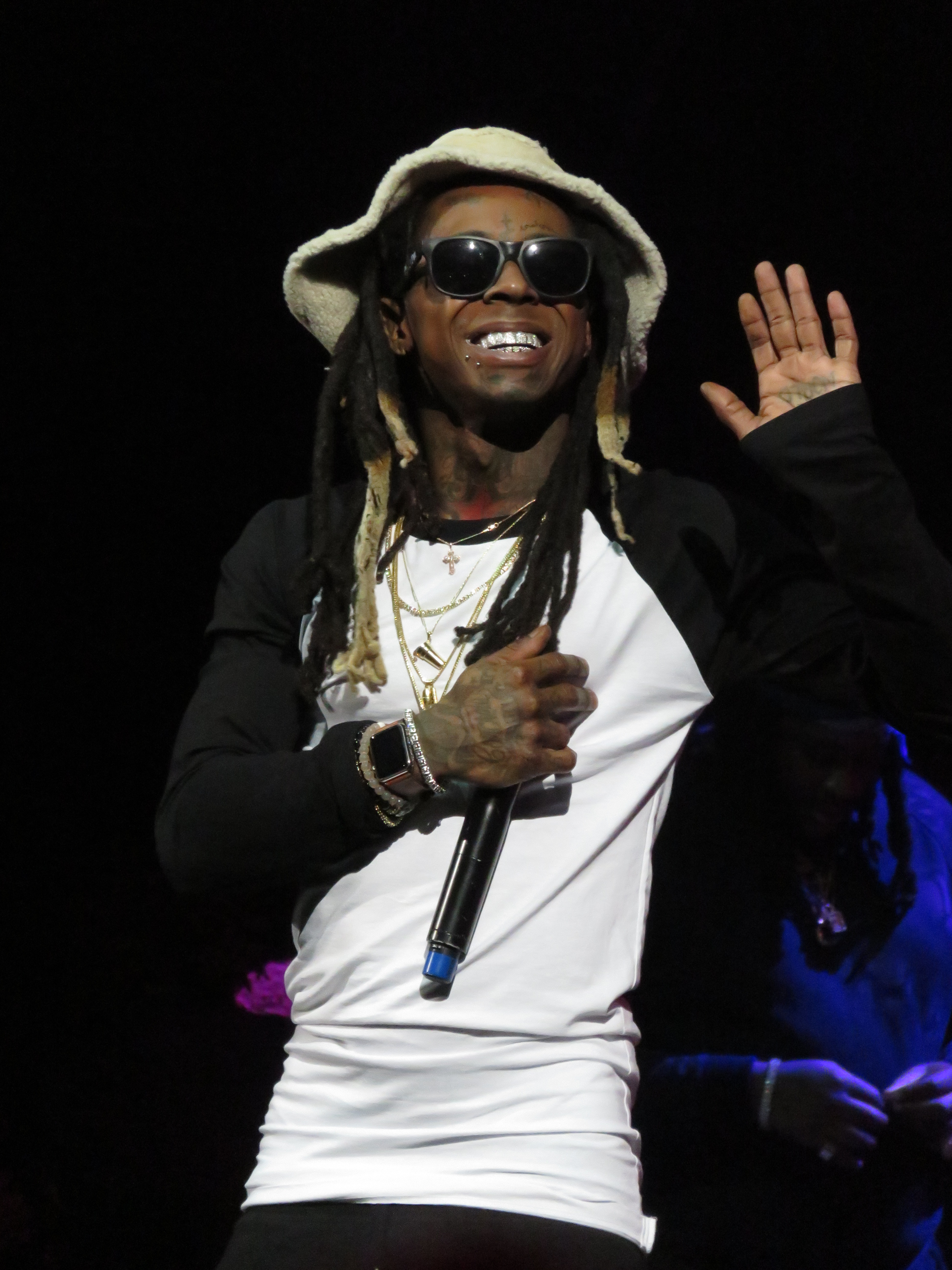
Lil Wayne (b. 1982)

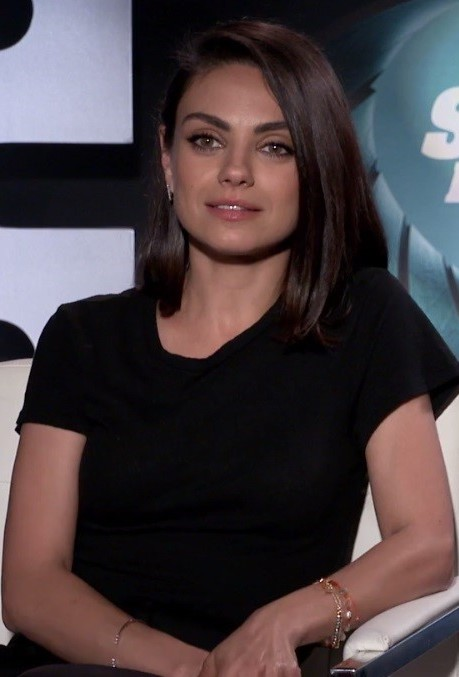
Mila Kunis (b. 1983)

Many people who were born during the cusp years of Generation X and the Millennials do not fit the mold of those generations but rather share characteristics of both.

The Generation X and Millennial demographic cohorts have been identified in studies of generational differences in the workplace. Researchers at Eindhoven University of Technology found that not every person who belongs to a major generation has the characteristics representative of that generation. People born on the cusp of two cohorts may have overlapping characteristics related to both. This is called "generational fuzziness" and can lead to identification of a "microgeneration". Researcher Melissa Kempf Taylor of the University of Louisville has written that the Xennial generation has its own collective personality. "In generational theory, a cusp is the group of individuals who fall into the overlap between two generations. [...] This overlap creates a cusp generation" that bridges the divide between "major generations".

In 2004, Cynthia Cheng wrote a piece for the Toronto Star titled "My So-Called Generation" that calls the cohort "Bridges".

British journalist Esther Walker has said that Xennials "occupy a very precarious and unusual space between these hardcore Gen Xers who went to raves and smoked and did a lot of drugs and these Millennials who were parented by early gen-Xers and had things smoothed out for them."

Writing for Las Cruces Sun-News, Cassie McClure said the Oregon Trail Generation remembers "a time before the digital age, but barely". Anna Garvey has written that these people have "both a healthy portion of Gen X grunge cynicism, and a dash of the unbridled optimism of Millennials", and discussed their relationship with both analog and digital technology. For Vogue, Sarah Stankorb wrote that Xennials were "never cynical enough to be truly grunge, but not nearly as cheerfully helicopter-parented as millennial participation-trophy kids." For Sheknows, Lisa Fogarty wrote that people born in the late 1970s and early 1980s share traits with both Generation X and Millennials.

Dustin Monke of The Dickinson Press described those born in the early 1980s as having early adulthoods affected by the September 11 attacks and the Iraq War.

Almudena Moreno, a sociologist at the University of Valladolid and co-author of the Youth Report in Spain 2012, wrote, "There are common experiences, and one of the differences between generations can be access to technological instruments, which provide a common living context." This context also influences how we relate to others. According to Australian sociologist Dan Woodman, "The theory goes that the Xennials dated, and often formed ongoing relationships, pre-social media. They usually weren't on Tinder or Grindr, for their first go at dating at least. They called up their friends and the person they wanted to ask out on a landline phone, hoping that it wasn't their intended date's parent who picked up." Woodman called Xennials a "cross-over generation", crediting this idea to journalists writing about people born during the cusp years, saying that it sounds plausible because "the divisions we use aren't particularly robust. They tend to be imported from North America without much thought, built arbitrarily around the Boomers, and capture changes that often don't have clear inflection points, so dates can vary." But he warned that no cohort of people will have the same characteristics or experiences. Woodman added: "Clearly the idea resonates with a lot of people who felt left out by the usual categorizations." Paraphrasing philosopher José Ortega y Gasset, Woodman wrote, "we are formed by the time in which we live", especially by the experiences of our youth, "which determine our lives and can create new political movements".

According to author Lesley Prosko, Xennials "have the cynicism of Gen Xers, but also the positivity of millennials." She added, "Xennials often felt controlled by their helicopter parents throughout their own childhood, evolving into 'drone parents' whereby they are always nearby but don't direct their children".

Authors Hannah Ubl, Lisa Walden, and Debra Arbit wrote that events such as the 1993 World Trade Center bombing, the Columbine shootings, and Princess Diana's death shaped these cuspers.

For GQ UK magazine, Jonathan Heaf wrote that Xennials "were born too early to be wafty, moany, experience-obsessed millennials, yet born too late to be grouped together with the rave-hardened gen Xs."

In Psychology Today, Christopher Dwyer called Xennials "Ninja Turtle–loving, neon-color clothes–wearing, pog-smashing, NES-controller bashing, Hulkamaniacs who had become teenagers when the Spice Girls took over the world and who entered adulthood as the World Trade Center was attacked."

Authors Fons Trompenaars and Peter Woolliams wrote that Xennials "tend to display their emotions more than their elders and consider societal issues like women's rights worth fighting for."

Bobby Duffy, professor of public policy at King's College London and author of the book Generations: Does When You're Born Shape Who You Are?, has said that young Generation Xers and old Millennials have more in common than young and old Millennials do: "There is a pretty distinctive break between older and younger Millennials with all sorts of things".

Ben Groundwater, writing for The Sydney Morning Herald, said: "Xennials are a weird generation – too young to be pessimistic Gen-Xers, but too old to be flaky Millennials. We're not the social media generation, but we know how to use it. Some of us got in before the property market boomed – some of us did not.

=== Political activity ===
In Politico, Annabelle Dickson wrote that Britain's youngest prime minister, Rishi Sunak, and his staffers are Xennials. She added, "unlike their Gen X predecessors, the Xennials were still children when Margaret Thatcher was in her pomp. The Conservative prime minister had left office by the time they hit their politically-formative mid-to-late teens and early 20s, even if her legacy lingered on."

According to British journalist Esther Walker, New Zealand prime minister Jacinda Ardern's resignation was the "most Xennial thing ever". She wrote, "Generation X would be there until they were dragged out... no excuses, never say die, Rip Curl, riding big waves madness ... Millennials would have been made too freaked out by the internet to do anything."

=== Economic activity ===
The Xennial shopper right now is in or near their peak earning potential with peak responsibilities: caregiving for both kids and parents, homeownership, and demands at work. Those responsibilities make this customer a crucial point of connection between demographics. They're known by retailers to have higher basket sizes and more brand loyalty. Katherine Power, an American serial entrepreneur who targets Xennial female shoppers, said: "By targeting that micro-segment, it's helped us reach the generation below her and the generation above her", and that Xennials "have this millennial mindset in a lot of ways, but the tradition and nostalgia of Gen X"

Hannah Fearn, writing for Independent, wrote: "Economically, Xennials were the last of the lucky. They graduated with no or comparatively little student debt into a booming economy. Most had settled into initially stable jobs and careers before the 2008 financial crash and the allied housing bust. A proportion had already become homeowners before this moment too."

== Cultural identity ==
=== Technology ===
Xennials grew up without technology in the home – most did not have regular internet access until they were somewhere around the age of 18 – and yet they were young enough to fit easily to lives and workplaces guided by it. In fact, as new entrants they often drove that workplace change. Social media did not arrive until they were in their mid to late twenties; they are embedded within it now but their young adult years were not curated by it.

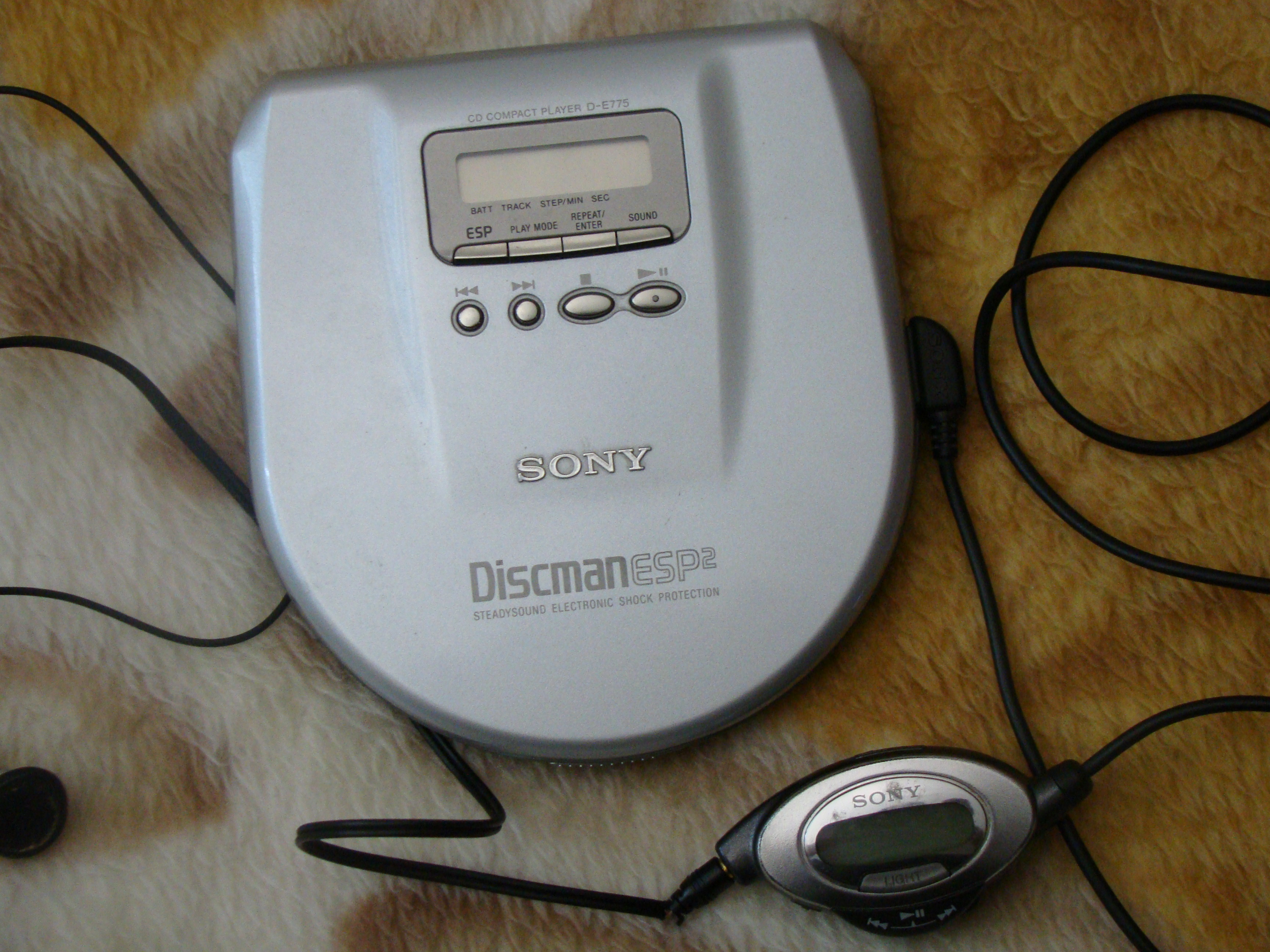
The Discman was a popular music listening device with Xennials in the 1990s.

In early childhood, Xennials began listening to music on a Walkman using cassette tapes, during their adolescence they moved onto Discman using compact discs and MiniDisc, and during their university years they were the first to illegally download MP3 files from Napster according to author Davide Sisto in his 2021 book titled Remember Me:Memory and Forgetting in the Digital Age.

Anna Garvey, writing for PopSugar, characterized US members of this group as having had an "AOL adolescence" and as being from "the last gasp of a time before sexting, Facebook shaming, and constant communication". She also said: "The importance of going through some of life's toughest years without the toxic intrusion of social media really can't be overstated. Myspace was born in 2003 and Facebook became available to all college students in 2004. So if you were born in 1981-1982, for example, you were literally the last graduating class to finish college without social media being a part of the experience."

"Dial up modem noises"
Typical noises of dial-up modem (North America and United Kingdom) in order to get access to the public Internet.

Authors Hannah Ubl, Lisa Walden and Debra Arbit said that as kids and early teens, Xer/Millennial cuspers "witnessed the switch from no Internet to dial-up, and from computers being things reserved for NASA scientists to owning a personal Dell at home."

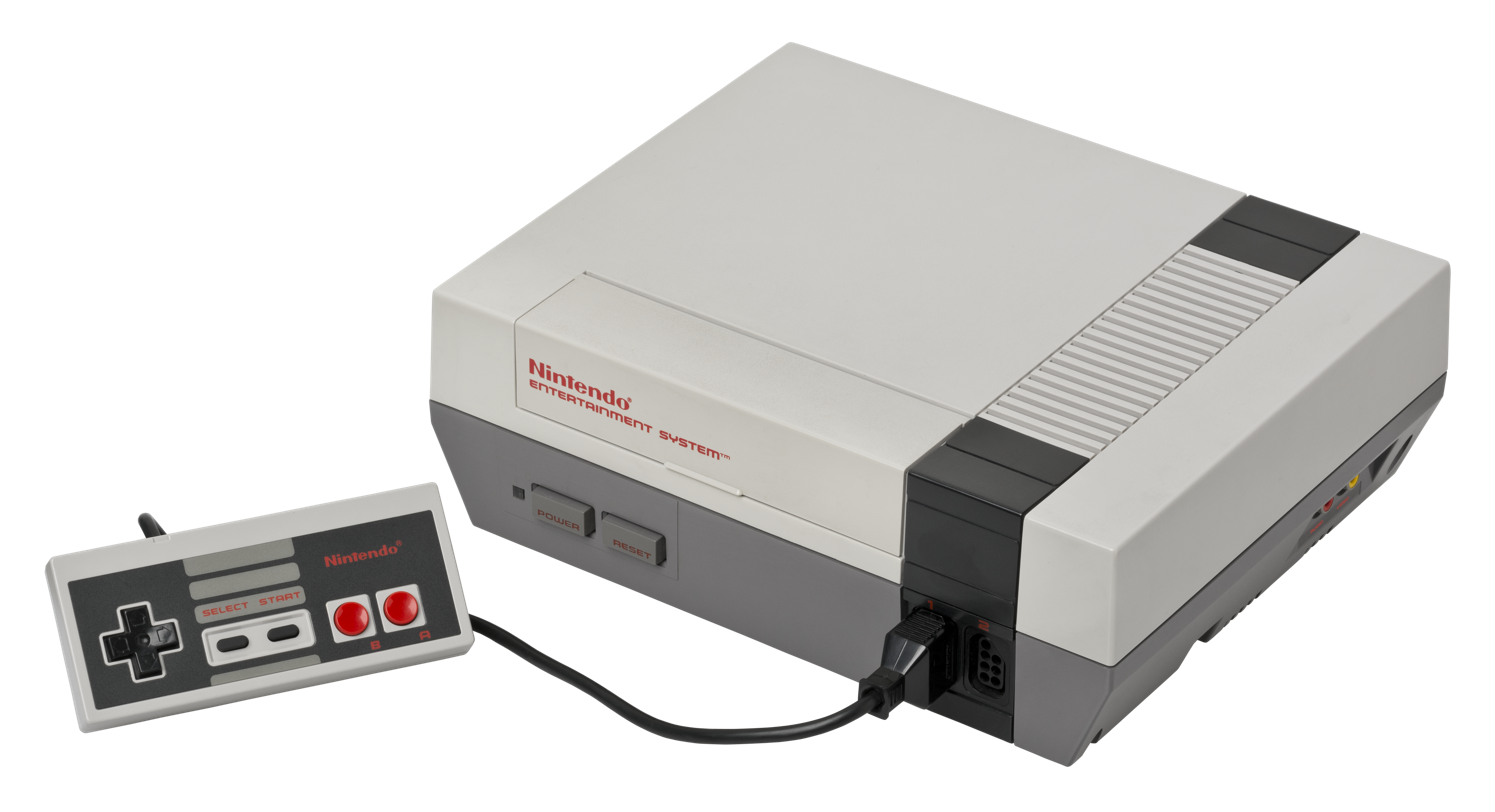
The Nintendo Entertainment System (NES) holds a significant place in nostalgia and cultural touchstones of the Xennial generation.

Jonathan Heaf, writing for GQ UK magazine said that Xennials "had an analogue upbringing but have evolved to be fluent(-ish) in all things digital."

Marleen Stollen and Gisela Wolf of Business Insider Germany wrote that Xennials "had to bridge the divide between an analog childhood and digital adulthood", while Australian researchers Andrew Fluck and Tony Dowden characterized the generation's pre-service teachers as "straddl[ing] the two worlds of the ballpoint pen and the computer mouse." Fluck and Dowden also described Xennials as the youngest digital immigrants since, unlike students of later generations, most Xennials had relatively little, if any, exposure to digital ICT as part of their schooling. As working adults, however, Xennials tend to be relatively comfortable using digital technology compared to digital-immigrant workers of earlier generations.

== See also ==
- Cusper
- Generation Jones
- Interbellum Generation
- MTV Generation
- Zalphas
- Zillennials
