= Zillennials =

Cohort born during the early 1990s to late 1990s

Zillennials, occasionally called Zennials, are a social cohort encompassing people born on the cusp of or during the later years of the Millennial generation and the early years of Generation Z. Sources typically give ranges of those born from 1993 to 1998, though some extend this further in either direction. Their adjacency between the two generations and limited age set has led to their characterization as a "micro-generation". They are generally the children of younger Baby Boomers, and Generation X. Estimates of the US population in this cohort range from 30 million to 48 million.

== Etymology ==
The term Zillennial is a portmanteau of "Generation Z" and "Millennial". A similar portmanteau, Zennial, is also used, which is comparable to Xennials (a portmanteau of Generation X and Millennials). Other names that have been proposed for these cuspers include the Snapchat Generation by authors Ubl, Walden, and Arbit, and MinionZ by Smit. GenZennials was used to reference the micro-generation by Ketchum.

== Date and age range definitions ==
The exact date range of this micro-generation is not specifically defined, but encompasses the latter years of the Millennial generation and the early years of Generation Z. Pew Research Center stated that "the differences within generations can be just as great as the differences across generations, and the youngest and oldest within a commonly defined cohort may feel more in common with bordering generations than the one to which they are assigned."

Dictionary.com defines "zillennial" as a person born between the early 1990s and late 1990s. Charissa Cheong, writing for Business Insider, defines Zillennials as "born roughly between 1990 and 2000". Payment processing researcher PYMNTS defines Zillennials as those born from 1991 to 1999. Authors Hannah Ubl, Lisa Walden, and Debra Arbit define the cuspers as those born between 1992 and 1998, as does Mary Everett (PopSugar), Nicea DeGering (KTVX), and a WGSN case study. Boston University sociologist Deborah Carr defines zillennials as those born "roughly" between 1992 and 2002, but notes that "there isn't one consistent cutoff point that experts agree on".

Others have defined zillennials as those born from 1993 to 1998, including Encyclopædia Britannica, Deon Smit (HR Future), Maisy Farren (Vice), Lindsay Dodgson (Business Insider), Charlotte Hilton Andersen and Jason Dorsey (Reader's Digest), Maddy Mussen (The Standard), Louis Ashworth (Financial Times), Nick Lichtenberg (Fortune), Becca Monaghan (Indy100), Alicia Lansom (Refinery29), Mollie Quirk (Glamour UK) and MetLife. Ally Foster, writing for news.com.au, defines Zennials as those born from 1993 to 1998. Violet Lazarus, writing for The Daily Orange, defines the cuspers as those born from 1993 to 1997. Fullscreen defines the cusp group as those born from approximately 1993 to 1999 in their research. Likewise, authors Fons Trompenaars and Peter Woolliams use the years 1993 to 1999 for Zennials. Author Mary Donahue defines the cuspers as those born from 1995 to 2000.

== Characteristics ==
Zillennials are influenced by traits of both the preceding Millennial generation and subsequent Generation Z, often sharing strong, polarizing connectivity to one adjoining generation over the other. Members of this micro-generation consider the "fluid" nature of their age grade unsettling with potential to "tarnish their status and input in the workplace [via ageism]", according to a WGSN case study. The case study found that some zillennials preferred to be seen as Millennials in the workplace, as they are seen as more professional, while younger zillennials believed they were "too young" for the characterization. According to author Tim Elmore, social scientists believe that a second micro-generation could lie between the Millennial generation and Generation Z due to rapid demographic change during the 2010s.

A 2024 survey conducted by YouGov among 13,083 US adults found that 31 percent of Millennials relate to their own generation the most, while 19 percent relate to Gen Z. On the other hand, 31 percent of Gen Zers relate to their own generation the most, while 15 percent relate to Millennials. The survey also found that most Millennials and Gen Zers do not consider themselves to be part of the generation they're officially a part of.

Members of this cohort were children in the 2000s, during events such as the 9/11 terrorist attacks. Zillennials were too young for full understanding of the geopolitical context or the gravity of the 9/11 terrorist attacks, but grew up in the significant aftermath that helped shape their worldview. They came of age in the 2010s, with the Brexit referendum and US presidential election of 2016, COVID-19 pandemic, and the 2020–2021 George Floyd protests being key formative events. They remember life in the early 2000s before smartphones, then experienced the sudden global Digital Revolution of the late 2000s and 2010s, navigating mobile LTE internet, cell phones, mobile devices, and smartphones.

Zillennials code-switch between generations, have high levels of digital literacy, and are more likely to self-identify into a minority group. They are less wealthy but more economically secure than Generation Z, commanding relatively high spending power in the US economy, especially when compared to Millennials. They also have high brand loyalty, low price sensitivity, and stable purchasing patterns.

Maddy Mussen, writing for The Standard, said that zillennials "have a unique position of being close enough to Gen Z that we can understand their strange language and behaviours, but with enough years behind us that our behaviour hasn't been totally and irrevocably warped by the forces that f***ed up their youth. We were on the last helicopter out of TikTok-gon." She also stated that zillennials grew up in a world shaped "for the better" by Millennials, "body positivity, sex positivity, and fourth-wave feminism were all reaching a peak during our formative years."

Zillennials are seen as a bridge between the digital pioneers of the early internet (Millennials) and the "internet natives" of Gen Z according to a definition made by Trusted Media Brands.

Jason Dorsey, president of The Center for Generational Kinetics, described zillennials as "equal parts idealistic and skeptical, analog roots with digital instincts" and that "they probably remember life before smartphones, but not before the internet".

According to authors Trompenaars and Woolliams, zillennials "were born digital and do not know a world without social media or the internet. They don't consider they have a born right to owning property with a mortgage or a career where they have the same job at the beginning and end of their working life. They like sharing their feelings with friends".

=== Arts and culture ===
The advent of "Zillennialcore" to describe the cultural backdrop of this micro-generation references music, media, and fashion. Members of this cohort often code-switch, "[aging] up when speaking to [Millennials] and [aging] down when speaking to younger relatives." They are seen as "cultural tastemakers", particularly in youth subcultures for both younger Millennials and older members of Generation Z. Their creative content is marked by an emphasis on authenticity, relatability, and social consciousness, rejecting curated programming typical of the Millennial generation. They have substantial control over internet meme culture, donning the moniker "meme lords". "They remember life before the internet (just about), but they also know how to navigate meme culture and social media codes" according to a news article from Reuters Institute. Charlotte Hilton, from Reader's Digest, wrote that zillennials "are fluent in both sarcasm and memes" and that "they witnessed the dawn of influencer culture and probably tried to become one during quarantine".

Zillennials are cultural hybrids of both Millennials and Gen Z according to a definition from Power Thesaurus. Abercrombie & Fitch noted a target demographic of 25 to 29-year olds in 2022 as having "a bit of both Gen Z and Millennial mentality". They rebranded between 2020 and 2022 to capitalize around what they perceived to be the micro-generation's ethos: fulfillment and self-actualization. The brand identified zillennials and their usage of TikTok as being a major cultural exporter.

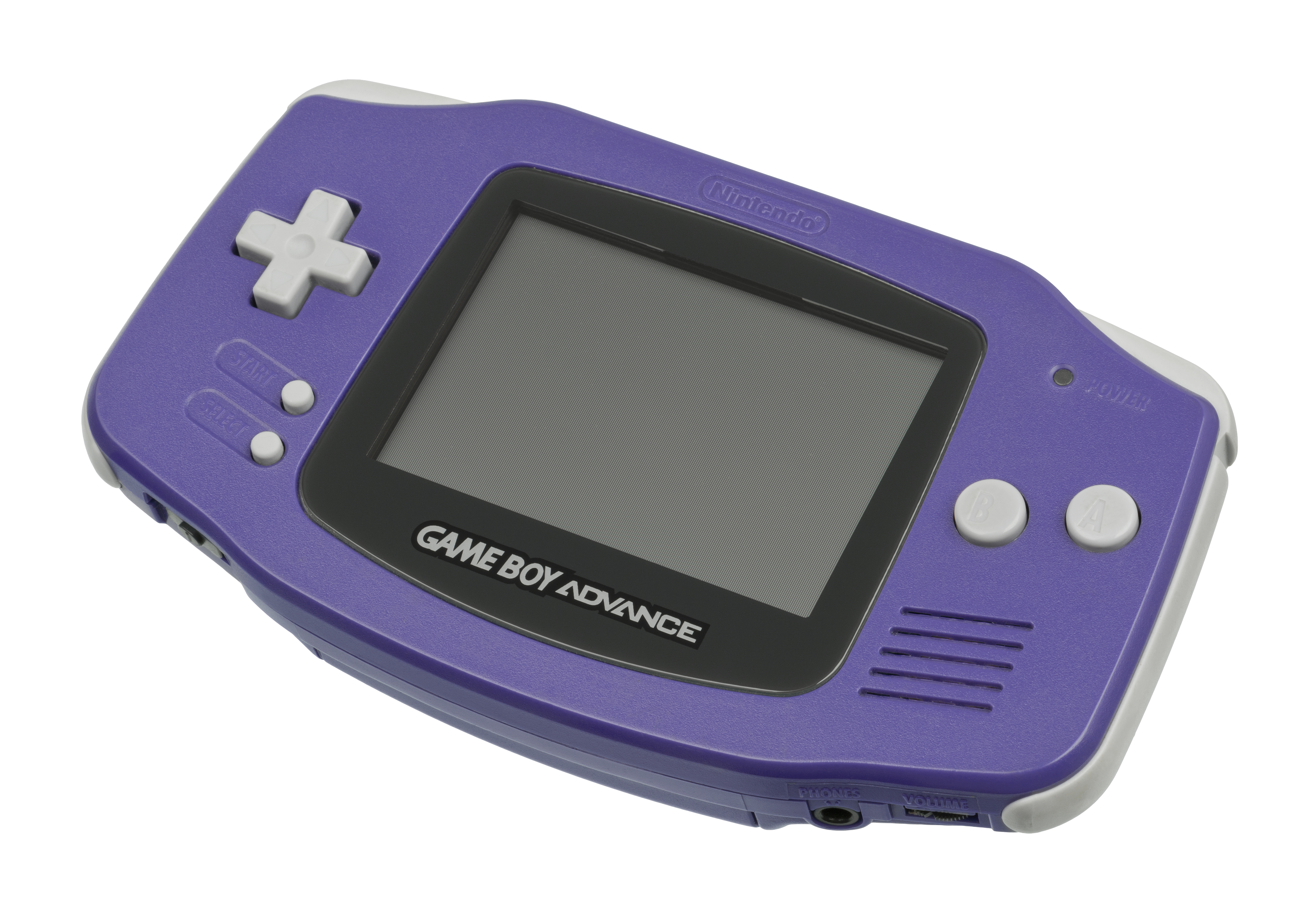
Game Boy Advance, popular handheld gaming device

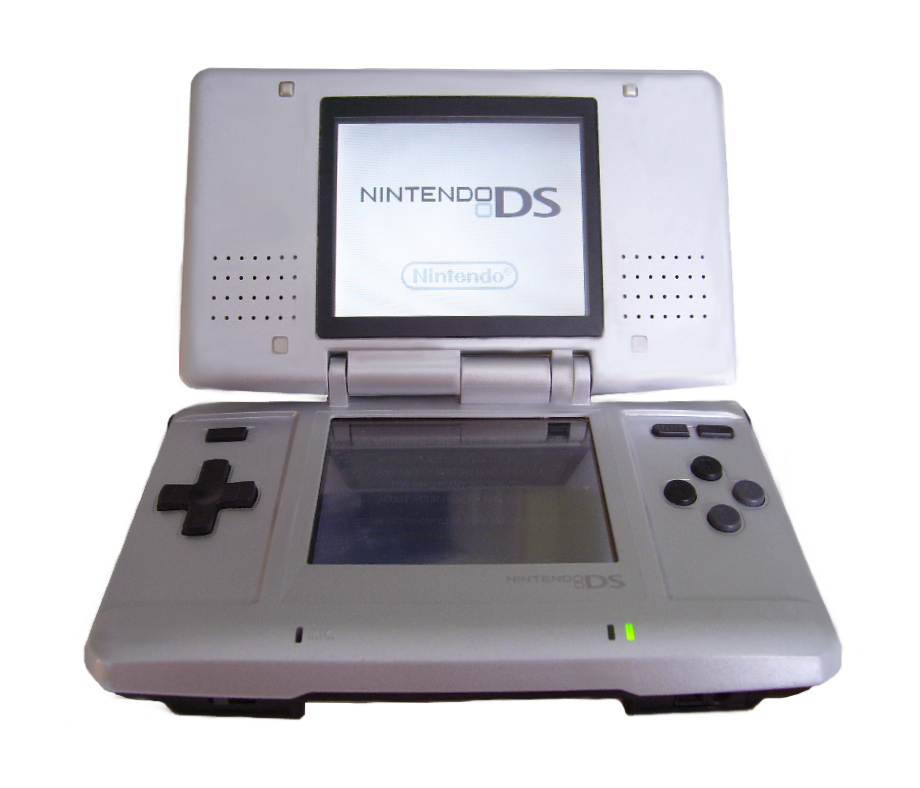
Nintendo DS, popular handheld gaming device with two screens

Many Zillennials are nostalgic for the popular culture and technology of the first decade of the 21st century, such as the Harry Potter franchise, SpongeBob SquarePants, Game Boy Advance, Nintendo DS, and other Disney Channel and Nickelodeon shows.

Mia Galuppo, writing for The Hollywood Reporter, said that many viewers of the live-action Lilo and Stitch were Zillennials. She noted that "nostalgia as entertainment, intentional or not, is nothing new. But it has not yet been fully exploited for the Zillennial age demographic, which is now one of the largest age groups in the US". Data collected by Disney and PostTrak showed that moviegoers between ages 25 and 34 made up 33 percent of the film's non-family audience.

Author Benjamin Crace, in his book titled The American Blockbuster: Movies That Defined Their Generations, says that zillennials "have grown up with a steady dose of the supernatural in pop culture (vampires, witches, zombies) to a point where it has become somewhat normalized".

A 2024 report made by Parrot Analytics, a leading global entertainment analytics company, says that "the share of shows with strongly Zennial skewing audiences sometimes tracks more closely with Gen Z and sometimes with Millennials which can make it difficult to tease out unique content tastes for this cohort" but that they are particularly fond of romantic movies (31%) over animated, horror and western films.

Chris Molanphy, writing for Slate, said that Justin Bieber, Miley Cyrus, and Ariana Grande are a "tier of Millennial-slash-Z cuspers well past a decade of hitmaking and still scoring giant hits".

=== Economic activity ===
Their outlook on their economic prospects was shaped by the decade's period of instability such as the Great Recession of the late 2000s and the COVID-19 pandemic beginning in 2020 and continuing into the early 2020s. Experiencing the effect of these crises on their parents, siblings, and others informed their outlook later on in life. Around 48% of American zillennials lived with their parents in 2023, which, coupled with their digital literacy and stable incomes, generates substantial spending power. An analysis by Morgan Stanley found that members of this cohort helped sustain the luxury good sector during periods of economic downturn. In 2023, fund manager Ken Costa in a book review via the Financial Times argued that the transfer of wealth valued at $100 trillion from Baby Boomers to younger generations, including zillennials, could restructure the global economy.

A report from Bank of America found in 2020 that zillennials carry outsized influence in financial markets due to their shifting consumer preferences away from "meat, alcohol and cars". Payment processing researcher PYMNTS conducted a study on this cohort of US consumers in 2023. They are nearly identical to Generation Z when it comes to work habits, preferring similar levels of remote work, social connection, and app platform usage. They grew up during the tail end of the 2000s hustle-culture that prioritised career success, while also being influenced by their Gen Z peers' more relaxed approach to work. They hold a dual citizenship of sorts.

According to Mike Wiseman, writing for Personnel Today, the UK's leading free-access HR website, Zillennials "overwhelmingly prefer working in an office but demand environments that justify the effort to get there. They expect their workspace to offer access to green spaces, lots of light, fresh air, wellness and leisure facilities, great restaurants with health-conscious menus, and culture". He added, "Zillennials are reluctant to waste unnecessary time commuting long distances and are put off by sterile, soulless corporate environments. They want a straightforward route to the office, on foot, bike or ideally one form of public transport".

Zillennials have higher brand loyalty and less price sensitivity than Millennials, leading to more stable purchasing patterns. According to PYMNTS Intelligence reports, 75% of zillennials shop both online and in-store, blending digital convenience with the tactile benefits of physical stores and 72% of them are more influenced by trusted sources like friends or family than by traditional advertising when it comes to what drives their purchasing decisions. Zillennials are discerning shoppers, many place a high value on social and environmental factors when picking where to shop. For them, budgeting is also a key priority when making decisions about where and how to shop.

Consumers in this age group are more likely to live paycheck to paycheck than the population overall. Plus, they are likelier to have outstanding balances from student loans, credit cards, store cards and personal loans, among others.

A 2025 online survey of 1,089 US adults conducted by Arrivia, a travel loyalty technology provider, found that zillennials are emerging as a high-potential audience, with growing income and specific travel preferences. Nearly half live at home with their parents (48%) while reporting household incomes of $100,000 or more (41%), giving them more flexibility to spend on travel. Compared to the survey average, zillennials are nearly twice as likely to travel internationally. They also showed a higher interest than both Gen Z and Millennials in bundled packages that include a cruise, hotel and airfare. Nearly one in three zillennials (27%) said they've taken a cruise, compared to just 18% of Baby Boomers.

Zillennials are less likely than older consumers to own a motor vehicle as their primary means of transportation, instead, they are embracing alternatives such as leasing, public transit, and ridesharing services. They are also more likely than any other generation to name the lack of down payment funds as their top obstacle to home ownership.

=== Health ===
The onset of the COVID-19 pandemic disrupted certain social markers for zillennials. They are less likely than Generation Z to use online pharmacies.

A PYMNTS Intelligence's Generational Pulse survey shows that "digital-first Gen Zers and zillennials are racing ahead on virtual doctor's visits, health tracking apps, with alternative payment methods".

=== Personal values ===
According to CNN, zillennials are more aligned with Generation Z on social issues. A 2017 analysis by Ubl, Walden, and Arbit found that they were raised by "skeptical Xers and pragmatic Gen Jonesers" who, in turn, instilled in them a preference for pragmatism to idealism. Diversity and independence are the traits used most often by the cohort to describe what will set their micro-generation apart. The study found the cohort to be more creative and more likely to self-identify into a minority group than other generational cohorts.

Zillennials believe in global warming and efforts to mitigate climate change, with many identifying as eco-conscious.

=== Political activity ===
Patrice Peck, writing for Cosmopolitan, stated that zillennials were between the ages of 18 and 29 during the 2020 United States elections, and were the "key to ousting then-president Donald Trump and sending Joe Biden and Kamala Harris to the White House". Glamour UK noted their general political outlook as more socialist than Millennials. The UK Brexit referendum and US presidential election, both occurring in 2016, are seen as key formative political events by zillennials, many of whom were not yet of voting age but who observed these events as they unfolded and were shaped by them.

Zillennials actively participated in the 2020–2021 George Floyd protests which were the largest series of protests against police brutality in the United States (alongside international protests) since the civil rights movement.

Karlyn Bowman of the American Enterprise Institute, said that in the 2026 U.S. midterm elections, Zillennials, whom she said were "roughly ages 27-33" at the time, voted 68% for Democratic candidates.

=== Social life ===
Zillennials are less likely than Generation Z to use digital means, such as text messaging and dating apps, to connect with a romantic partner. They are considered socially and emotionally intelligent.

=== Technology ===
USA Today described zillennials as being digital natives "steeped in internet culture" with high levels of digital literacy. Zillennials and Generation Z share nearly identical digital engagement levels, 58.8% compared to 63.2%, respectively. Zillennials are more likely to consume news via online channels and play video games on consoles than Generation Z. According to a study done by Fullscreen, while zillennials are comfortable with technology and social media, they acknowledge it as a "love-hate relationship" with both. A majority of this cohort believe that technology betters the world. According to a 2024 report made by PYMNTS, 68% of zillennials are using voice technology for daily tasks, they say that "this microgeneration uses voice assistants more frequently than older age groups, particularly in areas like shopping, financial management and obtaining information". Another report from the same company reveals that zillennials are a driving force behind the evolution of digital banking, with a unique blend of tech-savviness and reliance on traditional financial institutions.

According to authors Hannah Ubl, Lisa Walden, and Debra Arbit, what really divides Millennial/Gen Edge (Gen Z) cuspers from the Millennial bunch is their use of technology and social media, "while Millennials may pride themselves on their know-how of social media, the Millennial/Edger cuspers are social media mavens".

== See also ==
- Generation gap
- Generation Jones — cohort born from 1954–1965
- Generation Z in the United States
- Glossary of Generation Z slang
- Interbellum Generation — cohort born from 1901–1914
- MZ generation — generation of Millennials and Generation Z in South Korea
- Post-90s — generation in China
- Zalphas — cohort born on the cusp of Generation Z and Generation Alpha
