= Interbellum Generation =

Cohort born from 1901 to 1914

The Interbellum Generation is a social generational term that is sometimes used to describe people born in the United States during the early 20th century, often specified as the years 1901 to 1914. This age range is more commonly considered the first half of the Greatest Generation.

== Characteristics ==
The name Interbellum (derived from the Latin inter "between" and bellum "war") comes from the fact that those born during this time were too young to have served in the military during World War I, and were generally too old to serve as enlisted personnel in World War II. Although many of them joined the armed forces in the latter conflict, they were more likely to have served behind the frontlines. Therefore, the Interbellum Generation is more commonly considered the first half of the Greatest Generation, or sandwiched between the Lost Generation and the Greatest Generation.

The oldest members of this generation came of age at the close of the 1910s in 1919, while the majority had matured during the Roaring Twenties, and the minority had turned 18 during the initial phase of the Great Depression from 1929 to 1932, prior to the election of Franklin D. Roosevelt and the promulgation of the New Deal. This fact contributed to the core of this generation holding lifelong left-liberal views in politics, especially on economic issues (many of them joined Communist fronts during the 1930s), although with a few prominent dissenters such as Barry Goldwater. Most of their children belong to the Silent Generation.

== Notable figures ==
Richard Arvin Overton (1906–2018), formerly the oldest living World War II veteran, was a member of this generation.

Four presidents of the United States were of the Interbellum Generation: Lyndon B. Johnson (born in 1908), Ronald Reagan (born in 1911), Richard Nixon, and Gerald Ford (both born in 1913). However, all four served in World War II with younger members of the Greatest Generation.

Two prime ministers of the United Kingdom were also members of the Interbellum Generation: Alec Douglas-Home (born in 1903) and James Callaghan (born in 1912). Like their American counterparts, they also served alongside later Greatest Generation members in World War II.

== See also ==
- Cusper
- Generation Jones
- Xennials
- Zalphas
- Zillennials
