= Microgeneration =

Microgeneration may refer to:

- Microgeneration (energy), genereting energy on small scale
- Microgeneration (sociology), people born between two generations
