= Zalphas =

Cohort born during the late 2000s to mid–2010s

Zalphas (also called Zalpha, Gen Zalpha, or Generation Zalpha) are a social cohort encompassing people born on the cusp of or during the later years of Generation Z and the early years of Generation Alpha. Sources typically describe Zalphas as those born from the late 2000s to mid–2010s. They have been described as children of younger Gen X and older millennials.

== Etymology ==
The term Zalpha is a portmanteau of "Generation Z" and "Generation Alpha". It refers to a micro-generation, a cusp generation or hybrid generation that bridges the two larger cohorts.

While internet communities and demographic forums had casually thrown the portmanteau around in the years prior, it broke into mainstream media and retail vocabulary in February 2023. The spike in popularity is largely credited to Kristin Patrick, the Chief Marketing Officer of Claire's. She began using the term in corporate and public marketing strategies to target the retail brand's primary demographic.

Shortly after, demographic institutions like McCrindle Research (the firm that originally coined "Generation Alpha") adopted and legitimized the concept.

== Date and age range definitions ==
There is no single universally agreed-upon birth-year range for Zalphas, as generational boundaries are fluid and subject to debate. Sources generally place them in the late 2000s to mid–2010s, often overlapping with the end of Generation Z and the beginning of Generation Alpha.

McCrindle Research, describes Zalphas as individuals born on the cusp between Generation Z and Generation Alpha. Rather than defining a strict numerical range, McCrindle emphasizes the transitional nature of the cohort as a bridge between the two generations.

Gina Desiderio (Healthy Teen Network), defines Gen Sigma as those born between 2007 and 2013. Ben Rosen (Connect), Vicki Ostrom and Sonia Mulford Chaverri (Screen Printing Mag), and a WGSN article define the cuspers as those born between 2008 and 2014. Geetika Chhatwal (Kadence International) defines the cuspers as those born between 2010 and 2015.

Author Maarten Leyts, defines the cohort as 2006–2012. 20Something, a Belgian professional services and strategic consulting agency, defines it as 2008–2013.

== Characteristics ==
According to McCrindle, Zalphas "embody a blend of characteristics and experiences from both Generation Z, who grew up during the digital age and witnessed the rise of social media, and Generation Alpha, who are considered true digital natives, having been born into a world with even more advanced technology".

A 2023 Business Insider article cited a survey according to which Zalphas expressed a preference for fewer romantic or sexual plotlines in TV shows, instead favoring greater emphasis on friendship or platonic relationships. According to Stephanie Rivas-Lara and Hiral Kotecha, two of the survey's authors, this could stem from being isolated during the COVID-19 pandemic: "Young people are feeling a lack of close friendships, a separation from their community, and a sense that their digital citizen identity has superseded their sense of belonging in the real world".

== See also ==
- Interbellum Generation
- Generation Jones
- Xennials
- Zillennials
