= Silent Generation =

Cohort born from 1928 to 1945

The Silent Generation, also known as the Traditionalist Generation or Builders Generation, is a demographic cohort following the Greatest Generation and preceding the baby boomers. The generation is generally defined as people born from 1928 to 1945. By this definition and U.S. census data, there were 23 million people from the Silent Generation in the United States as of 2019.

In the United States, the Great Depression of the 1930s and World War II in the early-to-mid 1940s caused people to have fewer children and as a result, the generation is comparatively small. It includes most of those who fought during the Korean War. Upon coming of age in the postwar era, Silents were sometimes characterized as trending towards conformity and traditionalism, as well as comprising the "silent majority". However, they have also been noted as forming the leadership of the civil rights movement and the 1960s counterculture, and creating the rock and roll music of the 1950s and 1960s.

In the United Kingdom, the Silent Generation was also born during a period of relatively low birthrates for similar reasons to the United States and was quite traditional upon coming of age. They lived through times of prosperity as young adults, economic upheaval in middle age, and relative comfort in later life. The Sixtiers is a similar age group in the Soviet Union whose upbringings were also heavily influenced by the troubles of the mid-20th century. The term "the builders" has been used to describe a similar cohort in Australia.

== Terminology ==
Time magazine first used the term "Silent Generation" in a November 5, 1951, article titled "The Younger Generation", although the term appears to precede the publication:

The most startling fact about the younger generation is its silence. With some rare exceptions, youth is nowhere near the rostrum. By comparison with the Flaming Youth of their fathers & mothers, today's younger generation is a still, small flame. It does not issue manifestoes, make speeches or carry posters. It has been called the "Silent Generation."

The Time article used birth dates of 1923 to 1933 for the generation, but the term somehow migrated to the later years currently in use. A reason later proposed for this perceived silence is that as young adults during the McCarthy Era, many members of the Silent Generation felt it was unwise to speak out.

The term "Silent Generation" is also used to describe a similar age group in the UK but has been at times described as a reference to strict childhood discipline which taught children to be "seen but not heard". In Canada, it has been used with the same meaning as in the United States. The cohort is also known as the "Traditionalist Generation".

== Dates and age range definitions ==
The Pew Research Center uses 1928 to 1945 as birth years for this cohort. According to this definition, people of the Silent Generation are 80 to 98 years old in 2026.

The Intergenerational Centre of the Resolution Foundation has used 1926 to 1945, while the Encyclopedia of Strategic Leadership and Management uses the range 1925 to 1945. This generation had reached maturity as early as 1946 and as late as 1963, but the majority of Silents had come of age in the 1950s, which was followed by older boomers in the 1960s. Authors William Strauss and Neil Howe use 1925 to 1942 as the birth years of the Silent Generation. People born in the later years of World War II who were too young to have any direct recollections of the conflict are sometimes considered to be culturally, if not demographically, baby boomers.

== Characteristics ==
=== Australia ===
Australia's McCrindle Research uses the name "Builders" to describe the Australian members of this generation, born between 1925 and 1945, and coming of age to become the generation "who literally and metaphorically built [the] nation after the austerity years post-Depression and World War II".

=== Soviet Union ===
The Silent Generation in the Soviet Union is similar to Sixtiers. These people were born into Stalinism, raised during collectivization, and were witnesses of the Holodomor. So even though there was no Great Depression in the Soviet Union, they still experienced a lack of resources and food as children. In the 1930s and 1940s many of them lost their parents or close relatives during Stalinist repressions and later during battles and German occupation in WWII. Sometimes this generation is called the "Children of XX-th Congress".

=== United Kingdom ===
==== Childhood and youth ====
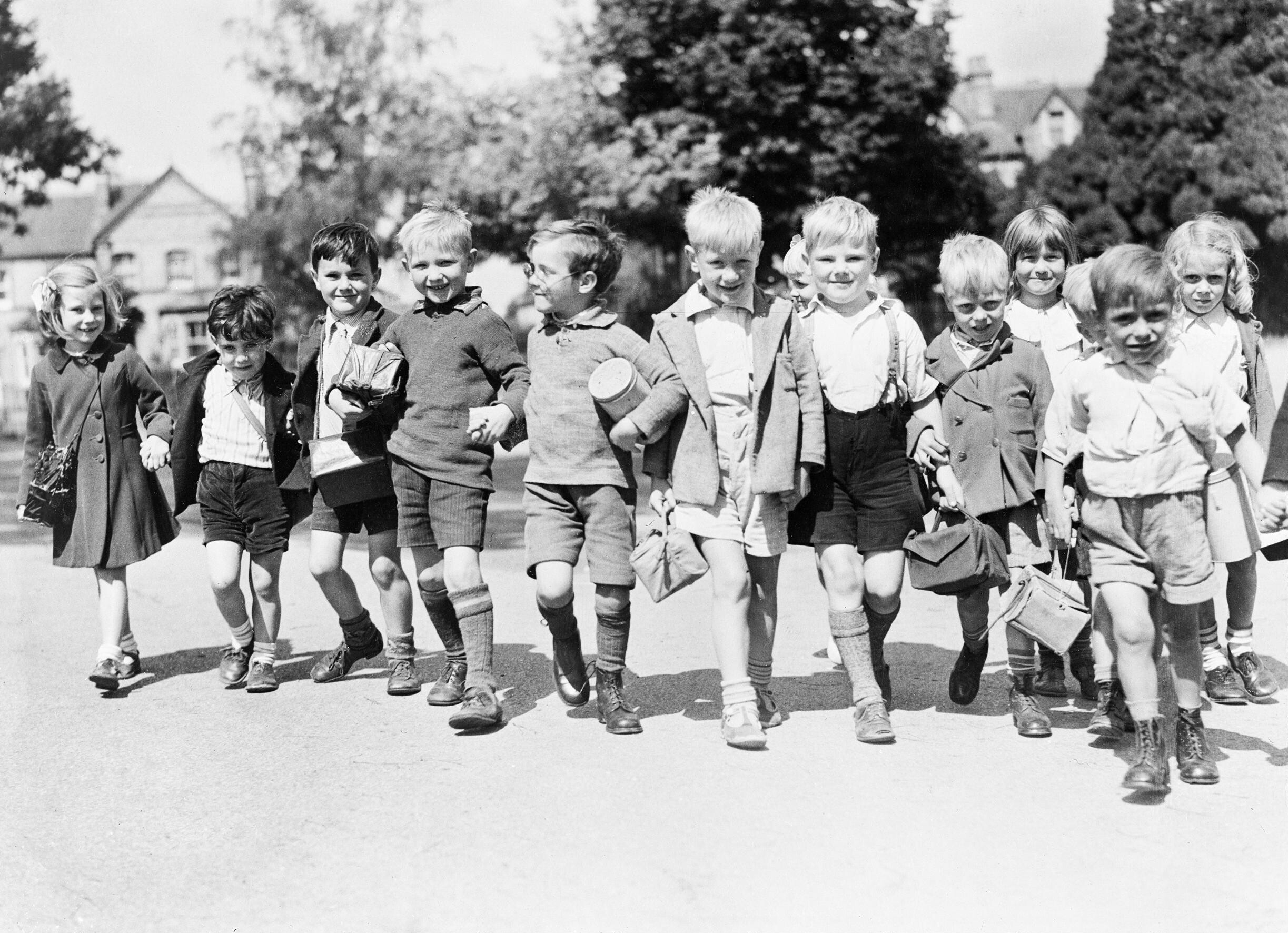
Child evacuees in Reading carrying gas masks which were issued to British civilians in 1938 during the Munich Crisis (1940)

There was a slump in birth rates in the UK between the two major baby booms following each world war. This roughly correlated with the economic downturn in the 1930s and World War II. The era of the Great Depression was a time of deprivation for many children, unemployment was high and slum housing was common. However, education was compulsory from the age of five to fourteen years old. Gaining a place at grammar school was a way for young people whose families could not afford them to be privately educated to gain full access to secondary schooling. In a time before widespread car use, children commonly played outside in the street and further afield without adult supervision. Toys of this era were quite simple but examples included dolls, model aeroplanes, and trains. Other popular activities included reading comics, playing board games, going to the cinema, and joining children's organizations such as the scouts. It was estimated that more than 85% of British households owned a wireless (radio) by 1939.

The Second World War impacted the lives of children in various ways. Significant numbers of schoolchildren were evacuated without their parents to the countryside to avoid the threat of bombing throughout the war years. The quality of education fell everywhere but particularly in urban areas for various reasons, including a shortage of teachers and supplies, the distress pupils suffered from air raids and the disruption caused by evacuations. The degree of supervision children received also fell as fathers left to fight and mothers joined the workforce. However, rationing during World War II and the years after improved the health of the population overall with one study conducted in the early 2000s suggesting that a typical 1940s child ate a healthier diet than their counterpart at the start of the 21st century. Following the Second World War, the school-leaving age was raised to 15 with every child being allocated to one of three types of school based on a test taken at the age of 11 in England, Wales and Northern Ireland (selection between two types of school took place at age 12 in Scotland).

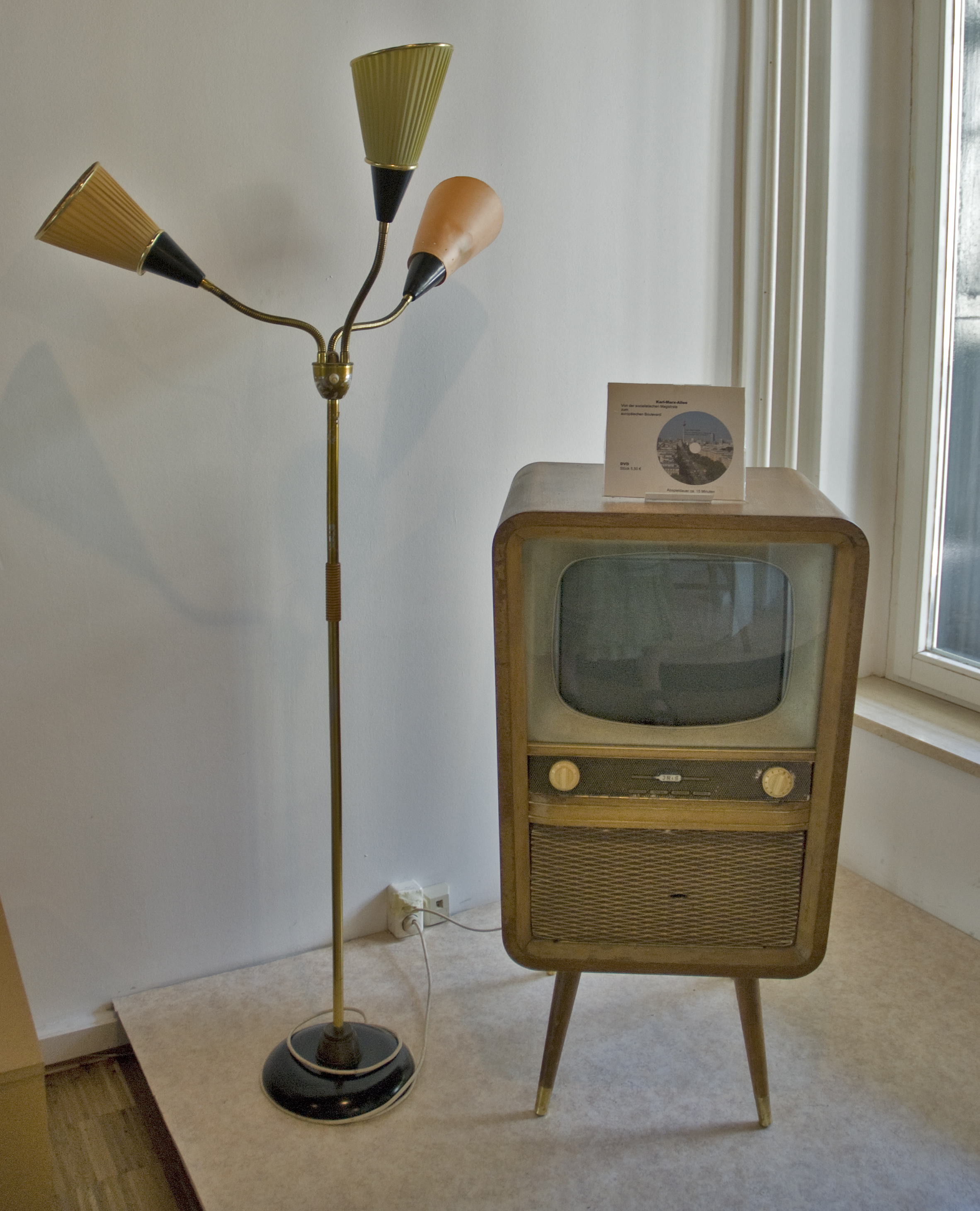
Early television, an example of mid-20th century consumer goods

The years after the Second World War saw a continuation of difficult social conditions; there was a serious housing shortage and rationing was at times more restrictive than it had been during the war. The late 1940s saw substantial social reforms and changes to the structure of the British economy. Economic conditions and living standards improved significantly during the 1950s and 60s. Unemployment rested at roughly two percent during this period, much lower than it had been during the depression or would be later in the 20th century. Consumer goods such as televisions and household labour saving devices became increasingly common. By the late 1950s, Britain was one of the most affluent societies anywhere in the world. In 1957, 52% of the British population described themselves as "very happy" in comparison to 36% in 2005. That year, Prime Minister Harold Macmillan famously said:

Let us be frank about it: most of our people have never had it so good. Go round the country, go to the industrial towns, go to the farms and you will see a state of prosperity such as we have never had in my lifetime – nor indeed in the history of this country.

The idea of the "teenager" as a distinctive phase of life associated with rebellion against adult authority and older generations social norms became increasingly prominent in public discourse during the 1940s and 50s, though in many ways those reaching maturity in the years after the Second World War were quite traditionally conservative in experience and attitudes. National service (military conscription) was reintroduced after the war and continued throughout the 1950s. Young people would often attend ballroom dances to socialise and find potential romantic partners. The average age of first marriage in England and Wales fell reaching its lowest level in more than a hundred years by the late 1960s of 27.2 and 24.7 years for men and women respectively. Cultural norms and government policy encouraged marriage and women to focus on their role as homemaker, wife and mother whilst their husband acted as the household's primary breadwinner. The treatment of those who did not meet society's expectations in their personal lives was often quite unsympathetic. Abortion and homosexuality were illegal whilst later investigations suggest that many women who gave birth out of wedlock had their babies forcibly removed from them. Laws were liberalised significantly in the late 1960s, but change was slower in certain areas in Scotland and Northern Ireland.

==== Mid and later life ====
Heavy industry had been troubled in the UK throughout the 1960s, this combined with a global energy crisis and influx of cheap goods from Asia led to rapid deindustrialisation by the mid-1970s. New jobs were either low wage or too high-skilled for those laid off. This situation led to significant political instability and industrial unrest causing a great deal of frustration and inconvenience to the general public. Meanwhile, another set of problems was developing in Northern Ireland where politics had become increasingly tense and divided during the 1960s. This developed into a sectarian conflict with the British Army involved known as The Troubles which continued over several decades. This conflict caused more than 3,500 deaths. In 1979, Margaret Thatcher became prime minister and brought about the end to some aspects of the Post-war consensus on economic policy. For instance, her government created the right-to-buy scheme which allowed renters to buy up their council homes at a reduced prices. Middle aged people were one of the social groups which particularly benefited from this policy. Her policies have been described as giving millions of people direct ownership of capital through share or house ownership but have also been associated with high unemployment, rising poverty and social unrest.

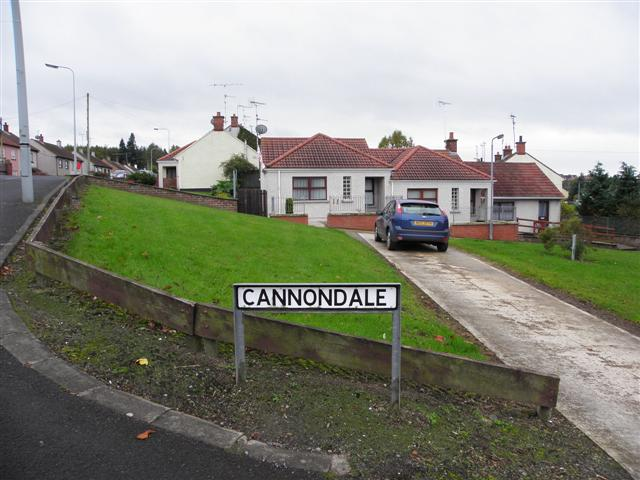
Houses adapted for elderly people in Omagh, Northern Ireland (2010)

For several decades prior to 2010, women received the State Pension from the age of 60 and men from the age of 65. A 2019 report stated that Pensioner Poverty in the UK had increased rapidly during the 1970s and the 1980s but fell in the 1990s and early 21st century. According to the report 20% of the silent generation, which it described as individuals born from 1926 to 1945, had lived in poverty at the age of 70 in comparison to 45% of the Greatest Generation and 15% of baby boomers at similar ages. The report attributed the change to more private pensions, increased home ownership and government policy. Commentators suggested that older people were somewhat insulated from the effects of the austerity programme in the 2010s. Though pensioner poverty was rising slightly by the mid to late 2010s and early 2020s, especially among women. The average life expectancy was around 80 years old, a few years older for women than men, in the late 2000s and 2010s.

==== General trends ====
An analysis of British Election Study surveys for the 1964 to 2019 general elections suggested that the Silent Generation as a cohort became more likely to vote for the Conservative Party as they grew older. The results suggested that at 35 years old, people born from 1928 to 1945 were about 5 percentage points less likely to vote Conservative than the national average, but that by the time they were 70 years old, they were about ten percentage points more likely to do so than the national average. They were, however, by the end of the time period studied, less likely to vote for the Conservatives than the next youngest age group, baby boomers. An article on the analysis commented that it is conventional wisdom that people become more conservative as they get older but that is not true of all the age groups the analysis covered and environmental factors are also important in influencing the development of voter behavior.

=== United States ===
==== As children and adolescents ====
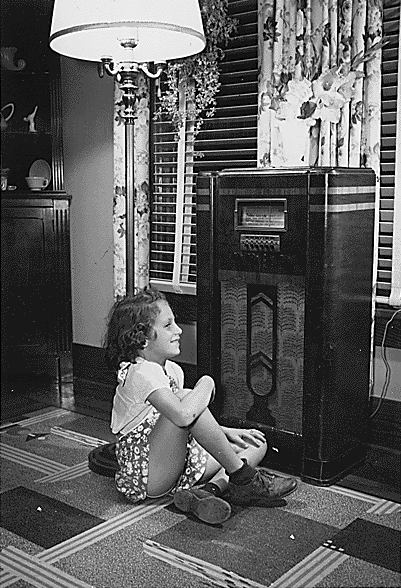
A girl listening to vacuum-tube radio during the Great Depression

As a cultural narrative, the Silent Generation are described as children of the Great Depression whose parents, having revelled in the highs of the Roaring Twenties, now faced great economic hardship and struggled to provide for their families. Before reaching their teens, they shared with their parents the horrors of World War II but through children's eyes. Many lost their fathers or older siblings who were killed in the war. They saw the fall of Nazism and the catastrophic devastation made capable by the nuclear bomb. When the Silent Generation began coming of age after World War II, they were faced with a devastated social order within which they would spend their early adulthood, and a new enemy in Communism via the betrayal of post-war agreements and rise of the Soviet Union. Unlike the previous generation who had fought for "changing the system," the Silent Generation was about "working within the system." They did this by keeping their heads down and working hard, thus earning themselves the "silent" label. Their attitudes leaned toward not being risk-takers and playing it safe. Fortune magazine's story on the College Class of '49 was subtitled "Taking No Chances". This generation was also heavily influenced by the transformations brought about by the Golden Age of Radio, the rise of trade unions, the development of transatlantic flight and the discovery of penicillin during their formative years.

==== In adulthood ====
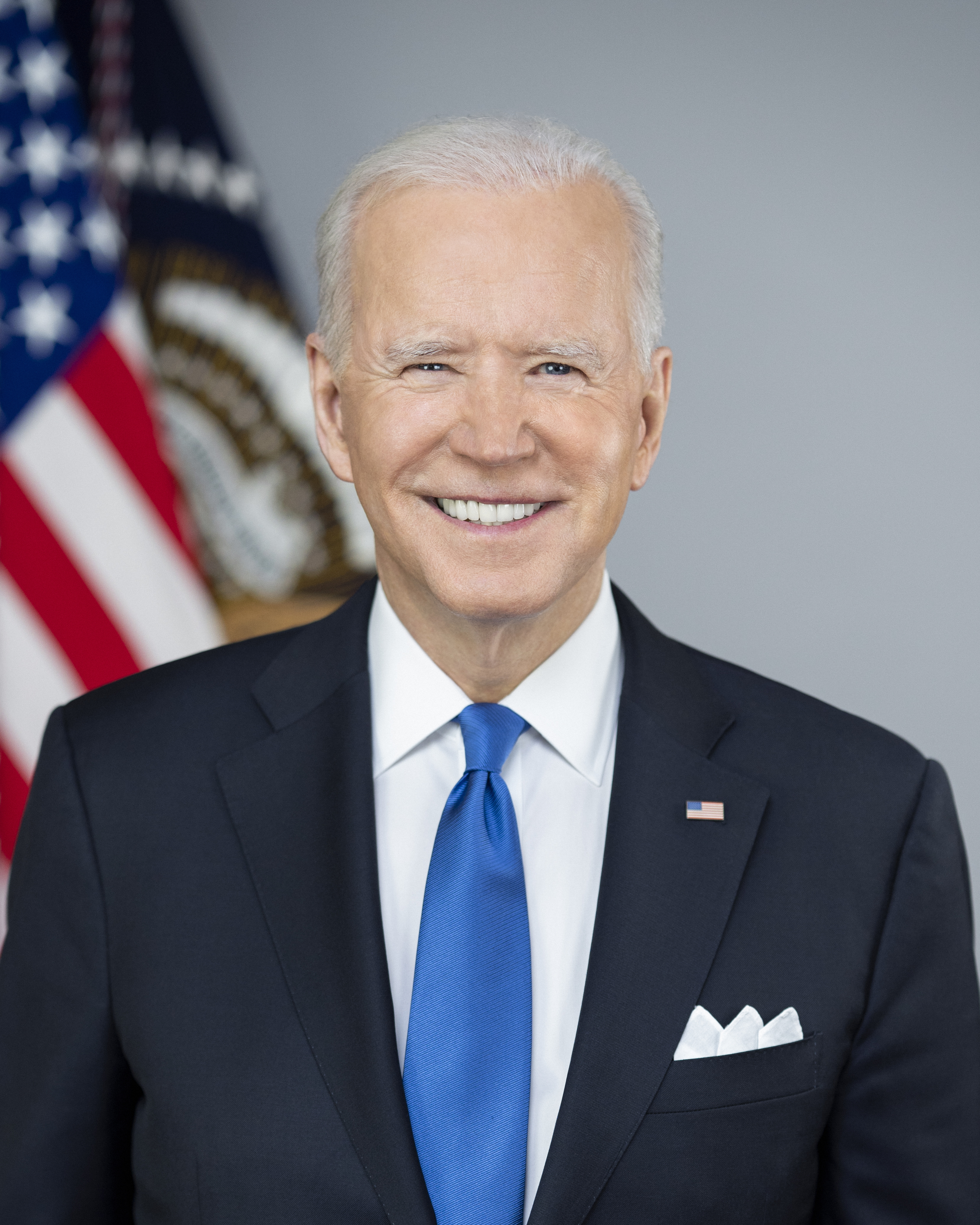
46th U.S. president Joe Biden (2021–2025) is a member of the Silent Generation.

From their childhood experiences during the Depression and the example of frugality set by their parents, Silents tended to be thrifty and even miserly, preferring to maximize a product's lifespan, i.e., "get their money's worth". This led some members of the Silent Generation to develop hoarding behaviors in the guise of "not being wasteful".

As with their own parents, Silents tended to marry and have children young. American Silents are noted as being the youngest of all American generations in the age of marriage and parenthood. As young parents, the older members of this generation primarily produced the later baby boomers, while younger members of the generation and older members who held off raising a family until later in life gave birth to Generation X. Whereas divorce in the eyes of the previous generation was considered aberrant behavior, the Silents were the generation that reformed marriage laws to allow for divorce and lessen the stigma. This led to a historically unprecedented wave of divorces among Silent Generation couples in the United States.

Critics of the theory that Silents tend towards conformity and playing it safe note that, at least in the United States, leaders of 1960s-era rebellion/innovation/protest such as Muhammad Ali, Bob Dylan, Noam Chomsky, Martin Luther King Jr., and Jimi Hendrix were members of the Silent Generation, and not baby boomers, although the majority of their followers were Boomers. While seven Presidents of the United States were members of the Greatest Generation (John F. Kennedy, Lyndon B. Johnson, Richard Nixon, Gerald Ford, Jimmy Carter, Ronald Reagan, and George H. W. Bush), and four presidents have been baby boomers (Bill Clinton, George W. Bush, Barack Obama and Donald Trump); two presidents were members of the Lost Generation (Harry S. Truman; and Dwight D. Eisenhower), only one President, Joe Biden, has been a member of the Silent Generation.

As a birth cohort, Silents never rose in protest as a unified political entity. Widely seen as "following the rules" and benefiting from stable wealth creation, their Boomer and Gen X children would become estranged from them due to their different views regarding social issues of the day and their relatively decreased economic opportunity, creating a different generational zeitgeist. For example, the Boomer children were instrumental in bringing about the counterculture of the 1960s, and the rise of left wing, liberal views considered anti-establishment, which went directly against the "work within the system" approach that many Silents had practiced. Gen X children grew up in the 1970s and 1980s with the threat of nuclear annihilation hanging over them and a resultant bleak view of the future, contributing to their generational disaffection, in contrast to the optimistic outlook of their Silent Generation parents.

The style of parenting by the Lost Generation or the Interbellum Generation (older members of the Greatest Generation) was known to the Silents, and the generations before them originated in the late 1800s, when the Lost Gens were children or teenagers. Representative of this was the idea that "children should be seen but not heard". These ideas were ultimately challenged following the 1946 publication of the book The Common Sense Book of Baby and Child Care by Benjamin Spock, which influenced some Boomers' views on parenting and family values when they became parents themselves. The book also influenced how baby boomers were parented. These less-restrictive behavioral standards, seen as overly permissive by the Silents, further estranged those Boomers from their parents and, among other things, gave rise in the 1970s to the term generation gap. This was to describe the initial conflict of cultural values between the Silents and Generation Jones (younger baby boomers) and to a lesser extent their Generation X children in the 1980s, although it was not quite as extreme as it was between the Greatest Generation and the "Leading Edge Boomers" (older baby boomers) in the 1960s.

== Demographics ==

Data is from the Pew Research Center. Recent cohort sizes are greater than the number born due to immigration.

== See also ==
- Beat Generation
- List of generations

Preceded by Greatest Generation; 1901 – 1927	Silent Generation; 1928 – 1945	Succeeded by Baby Boomers; 1946 – 1964
