= Cusper =

Person born near the border separating two generations

A cusper is a person born near the end of one generation or the beginning of another. While the precise birth years defining when these microgenerations start and end vary, people born in these circumstances tend to have a mix of characteristics common to their adjacent generations and do not closely resemble those born in the middle of their adjacent generations. Generational profiles are built based on people born in the middle of a generation rather than those on the tails of a generation. Generations may overlap by five to seven years. Because of this many people identify with aspects of at least two generations.

== Notable cusper groups ==
=== Greatest Generation / Silent Generation ===
==== Birth year ranges ====
- Just before the 1920s, as identified by Graeme Codrington

==== Characteristics ====
The Greatest Generation/Silent Generation cuspers experienced the lows after World War I but also the highs of the early Roaring Twenties, the Flappers, the Charleston and early silent films. As these cuspers came of age, some of them become more visionary like the Greatest Generation or stoic like the Silents. Some researchers specifically identify the 1914–1925 range as the "Late Greatest and Early Silent Generation Cusp," sometimes called the G.I. Generation. Others consider 1915-1929 as a broader transitional group, while some sources simply place the cutoff between 1924-1928, making those born immediately around those years the "cuspers".

=== Silent Generation / Baby Boomers ===
==== Birth year ranges ====
- 1933–1945 as identified by Susan Mitchell
- 1939–1945 as identified by Claire Raines Associates
- 1940–1945 as identified by Lynne Lancaster and David Stillman, authors of When Generations Collide, as well as The Mayo Clinic
- 1942–1948 as identified by Fons Trompenaars and Peter Woolliams
- 1943–1948 as identified by Deon Smit, writing for HR Future

==== Characteristics ====
Claire Raines Associates names these Silent Generation/Baby boomers the Sandwich Group, Susan Mitchell calls these cuspers the Swing Generation, Smit calls them Troomers and Trompenaars and Woolliams call them Shhh-oomers. According to the Mayo Clinic, these cuspers have the work ethic of the Silent Generations, but like Baby Boomers will often challenge the status quo. Codrington describes them as having the status-seeking, career advancement motivations as Baby Boomers. Codrington adds that they are old enough to remember World War II, but were born too late to enjoy the 1960s. Hart notes that research has found the younger members of the Silent Generation tended to share more traits with Baby Boomers. Writer Marian Botsford Fraser described women in this cusper population as girls who "...did not smoke dope at high school, go to rock concerts, toy with acid and the pill and hippie boyfriends at university or tour Europe with a backpack." Instead, she notes "These girls wore crinolines and girdles, went to The Prom, went to nursing school and teachers' college, rarely university." Speaking of Susan Mitchell's population specifically they are believed to be an anomaly in that they tend be more activist and free thinkers than those born prior to them in the Silent Generation. Lancaster and Stillman echo this last point and note that these cuspers were on the frontlines of America's internal struggles as adults, agitating in favor of human rights. They go on to say many women among these cuspers entered in to male-dominated workplaces before the women's movement existed, blazing a trail for other generations of women to follow.

=== Baby Boomers / Generation X ===
==== Birth year ranges ====
- 1954–1965 as identified by Jonathan Pontell
- 1955–1960 as identified by Mary Donahue
- 1958–1967 as identified by Mark Wegierski of the Hudson Institute
- 1960–1965 as identified by Lynne Lancaster and David Stillman, Mayo Clinic, and Andrea Stone (USA Today)
- 1961–1968 as identified by Fons Trompenaars and Peter Woolliams
- 1962–1967 as identified by Deon Smit
- 1964–1969 as identified by Graeme Codrington

==== Characteristics ====
The Baby boomer/Generation X cuspers are sometimes referred to as Generation Jones, and less commonly as Tweeners, Baby X's by Smit, and Boomerex by Trompenaars and Woolliams. They were not as financially successful as the Baby Boomers. They faced a recession, like many Generation Xers, but found it more difficult to find employment. They are tech-savvy; however they didn't have computers through schooling years, and most were the first to purchase one for their homes. They took interest in video games. They get along well with Boomers, but share different values. While being comfortable in office environments, they feel more relaxed at home. They are less interested in advancing their careers and more interested in quality of life.

=== Generation X / Millennials ===
==== Birth year ranges ====
- 1975–1980 as identified by Mary Donahue, as well as The Mayo Clinic
- 1976–1982 as identified by Hannah Ubl, Lisa Walden, and Debra Arbit
- 1977–1981 as identified by Doree Shafrir (Slate)
- 1977–1983 as identified by Deon Smit, Merriam-Webster, and Fons Trompenaars and Peter Woolliams
- 1977–1985 as identified by Shana Lebowitz, Allana Akhtar, Marleen Stollen, Gisela Wolf (Business Insider) and Dan Russell
- 1979–1982 as identified by Alastair Greener

==== Characteristics ====
The Generation X/Millennials cuspers are most commonly referred to as Xennials, although other names include the Oregon Trail Generation, Generation Catalano and The Lucky Ones. Researchers point out that these cuspers have both the healthy skepticism of Generation X and the optimism of Millennials. They are likely to challenge authority, but also are more career-focused than Generation X. While not all of these cuspers are digital natives, they are very comfortable with technology.

=== Millennials / Generation Z ===
==== Birth year ranges ====
- Early 1990s and late 1990s as defined by Dictionary.com
- 1990–2000 as identified by Charissa Cheong (Business Insider)
- 1991–1999 as identified by PYMNTS Intelligence
- 1992–1998 as identified by Hannah Ubl, Lisa Walden, and Debra Arbit, WGSN, Mary Everett (PopSugar), and Nicea DeGering (KTVX)
- 1992–2002 as identified by Deborah Carr
- 1993–1997 as identified by Violet Lazarus (The Daily Orange)
- 1993–1998 as identified by Encyclopædia Britannica, Deon Smit (HR Future), Maisy Farren (Vice), Lindsay Dodgson (Business Insider), Charlotte Hilton Andersen and Jason Dorsey (Reader's Digest), Maddy Mussen (The Standard), Louis Ashworth (Financial Times), Becca Monaghan (Indy100), Alicia Lansom (Refinery29), MetLife, Ally Foster (news.com.au), and Nick Lichtenberg (Fortune)
- 1993–1999 as identified by Fullscreen, LLC and Fons Trompenaars and Peter Woolliams
- 1995–2000 as identified by Mary Donahue

==== Characteristics ====
Names given for Millennial/Generation Z cuspers include the Snapchat Generation by Ubl, Walden, and Arbit, MinionZ by Smit, GenZennials by Ketchum, Zillennials, and Zennials. They are characterized as being "raised less by optimistic Boomers and more by skeptical Xers and pragmatic Gen Jonesers, who raised them to focus more on the practical rather than the aspirational."

=== Generation Z / Generation Alpha ===
==== Birth year ranges ====
- 2006–2012 as identified by Maarten Leyts
- 2007–2013 as identified by Gina Desiderio (Healthy Teen Network)
- 2008–2013 as identified by 20Something
- 2008–2014 as identified by Ben Rosen (Connect) and Vicki Ostrom (Screen Printing Mag)
- 2010–2015 as identified by Geetika Chhatwal (Kadence International)

==== Characteristics ====
The Generation Z/Generation Alpha cuspers are most commonly referred to as Zalphas. They are characterized as being "digital natives familiar with digital gadgets and technology from the cradle."

A 2023 Business Insider article cited a survey according to which Zalphas expressed a preference for fewer romantic or sexual plotlines in TV shows, instead favoring greater emphasis on friendship or platonic relationships. According to Stephanie Rivas-Lara and Hiral Kotecha, two of the survey's authors, this could stem from being isolated during the COVID-19 pandemic: "Young people are feeling a lack of close friendships, a separation from their community, and a sense that their digital citizen identity has superseded their sense of belonging in the real world".

== Workplace importance ==
Communication misunderstandings between employees of different generations are detrimental to workplace morale, increasing turnover and absenteeism while decreasing job satisfaction, work commitment and productivity. Effective communication between employees of different generations, however, allows for collaborative relationships and ensures that information is retained from one generation to the next. Cuspers play an important role in multi-generational workplaces and other organizations. Metaphorically, cuspers are like bridges or glue that connect members of their adjacent major generations. Between generations, they are naturally skilled at mediating, translating, mentoring and managing. Strategically placing cuspers in the workplace has the potential to reduce generational workplace friction and give organizations doing so a competitive advantage.

== Generational identity ==
Many cuspers do not feel a sense of belonging to a specific generation. Researchers studying generational subculture theory have speculated that there may be populations within larger generational cohorts whose values are more in line with those of preceding generations, for example, someone born in the range of Generation X who has a moral philosophy more similar to the Silent Generation. Generations are heterogenous, and differences within a generation can be as great as differences between generations.

Jason Dorsey, a generations researcher, wrote: "about a third of Americans identify more with the generation just before or after their own. And many people fall into what we call cuspers—those born on the edges of two generations who carry traits from both. These unique "micro-generations" make sense when you think about how quickly the world changes, especially during our formative years."

According to authors Hannah Ubl, Lisa Walden and Debra Arbit, cuspers "play a pivotal role in ensuring seamless communication across generations" and "are natural translators because they often speak the language of two generations."

The generational fuzziness theory proposes that one's generation is best defined as the combination of one's birth year and generational identity—the cultural generation to feel most similar to. Not all cuspers identify with both sides of the generational dividing line. Many adopt the values of one side and conduct themselves accordingly.

== See also ==
- Middle Child Syndrome
