= Empire of Dirt (film) =

2013 film

- Film poster
- Directed by: Peter Stebbings
- Written by: Shannon Masters
- Produced by: Bob Crowe; Jennifer Podemski
- Starring: Cara Gee; Jennifer Podemski; Luke Kirby
- Cinematography: David Greene
- Edited by: Jorge Weisz
- Music by: Justin Peroff
- Production companies: Red Cloud Studios; Narrow Path Productions
- Release date: 6 September 2013 (TIFF)
- Running time: 99 minutes
- Country: Canada
- Language: English

Empire of Dirt is a 2013 Canadian drama film directed by Peter Stebbings. It was screened in the Contemporary World Cinema section at the 2013 Toronto International Film Festival.

The film was nominated for Best Picture (Jennifer Podemski, Heather K. Dahlstrom, Geoff Ewart) at the 2nd Canadian Screen Awards. It also garnered nominations for Best Actress (Cara Gee), Best Supporting Actress (Jennifer Podemski), Best Original Screenplay (Shannon Masters) and Best Editing (Jorge Weisz).

== Plot ==
The film stars Cara Gee as Lena, a young single First Nations mother struggling to bridge the generation gap with her daughter Peeka (Shay Eyre) and her mother Minerva (Jennifer Podemski).

== Production ==
The film was shot from 19 September to 4 October 2012 at Kensington Market in Toronto and at Keswick, Ontario. Its original working title was Empire of Dirt, and it was briefly called Running Wolf.

== Cast ==
- Cara Gee as Lena
- Shay Eyre as Peeka
- Jennifer Podemski as Minerva "Minnie"
- Luke Kirby as Russell
- Jordan Prentice as Warren
- Michael Cram as Doc Baker
- Sarah Podemski as Charmaine
- Lawrence Bayne as Hank
- Kate Corbett as Wendy
- Tonya Williams as Sandra
- Shannon Kook as Angel
- Sarah Manninen as Anna
