= Jared Pelletier =

Canadian film director

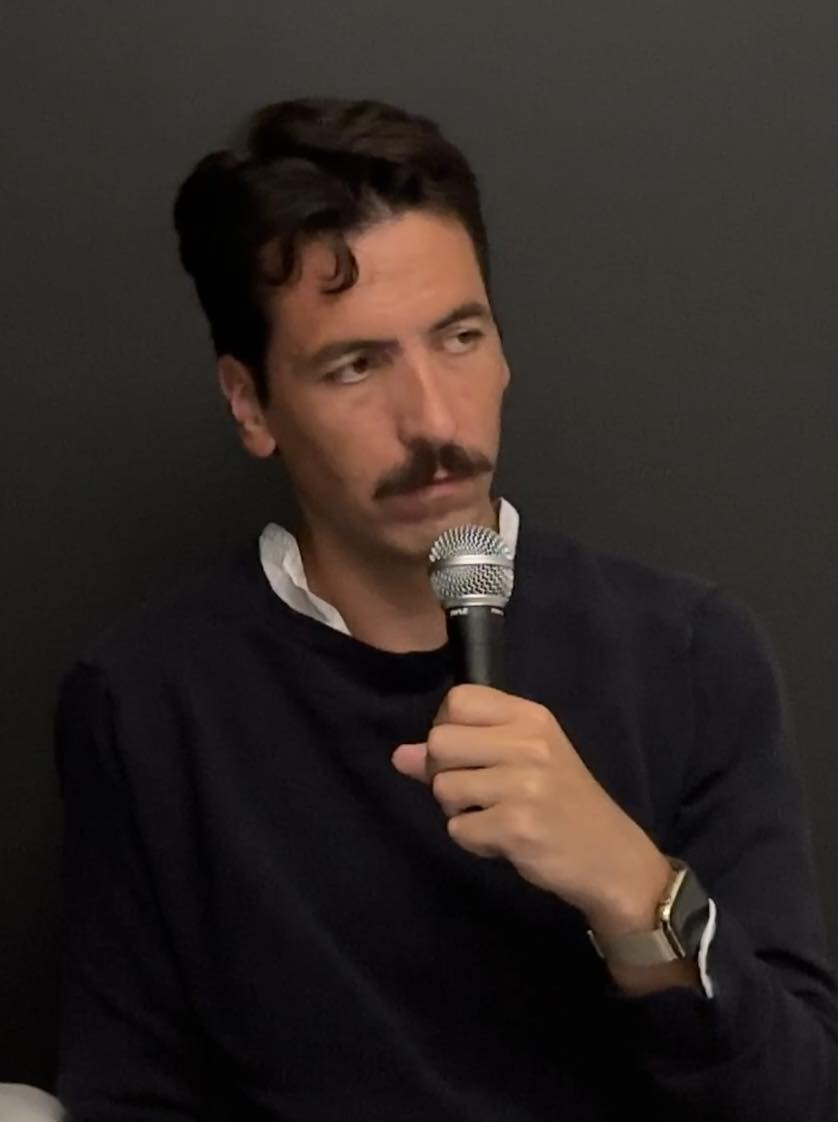
- Pelletier in 2023
- Born: 29 November 1990 (age 35)
- Occupation: Director
- Years active: 2008–present
- Website: jaredpelletier.com

Jared Pelletier (born 29 November 1990) is a Canadian director, responsible for a number of short films including In the Hearts of Men and the Machinima series Omega.

== Early life ==
Pelletier was born and raised in Aurora, Ontario, where he attended Cardinal Carter Catholic High School. In 2008, he graduated high school and attended Brock University studying Sport Management. Interested in film-making since the age of 6, he left the university to focus on it. In August 2010, he graduated from the Toronto Film and Media College. He has also studied business and law in entertainment by correspondence through the University of California Los Angeles.

== Career ==
Pelletier's first success came in 2009 when he was 18, with a shortlist at the Cannes Film Festival for The Collision. In March 2011 his World War II epic In the Hearts of Men took Best Director, Best Film, Best Cinematography, and Best Editing awards at the Arizona Film and Media Expo.

Soon after filming In the Hearts of Men, he moved on to Halo: Faith, based on the Halo series of video games, which has generated a wide viral following. In April 2011 he signed with Los Angeles–based Machinima.com. The YoungCuts Film Festival announced that his next project would be a film based on the video-game franchise BioShock, for a projected 2013 release. The first Bioshock trailer was released on 25 November 2011, and the film been in various production stages since 2008, involving producer Gore Verbinski, writer John Logan, and at one point another director, Juan Carlos Fresnadillo. However, the project was cancelled in March 2013, due to insufficient funding.

In October 2012, Pelletier completed principal photography on his first major series through the Machinima deal, titled Omega.

In October 2013, Pelletier returned with Call of Duty: Final Hour, a film based on the Call of Duty video-game franchise and released via Machinima.com.

Starting in 2018, Pelletier has directed the web series Inhuman Condition, written by R. J. Lackie and starring Torri Higginson and Cara Gee.

== Awards ==
Pelletier's short film The Collision was shortlisted at the Cannes Film Festival in 2009, when he was 18. In March 2011, his World War II piece In the Hearts of Men swept all major production awards at the Arizona Film and Media Expo, including Best Director, Best Film, Best Editing, along with Best Cinematography for director of photography Erik Tallek.
