= Strange Empire =

Canadian television drama series

- Genre: Western drama
- Created by: Laurie Finstad-Knizhnik
- Starring: Cara Gee; Melissa Farman; Tattiawna Jones
- Country of origin: Canada
- No. of seasons: 1
- No. of episodes: 13

Production
- Executive producers: Laurie Finstad-Knizhnik; Tim Johnson; Jeff Sagansky
- Production company: Janestown Productions

Original release
- Network: CBC Television
- Release: 6 October 2014 – 2 February 2015

Strange Empire is a Canadian Western television series that aired on CBC Television in the 2014–15 television season. Created by Laurie Finstad-Knizhnik, the series is a serialized drama set in Janestown, near the Alberta-Montana border in the 1860s, in which three women band together for survival after their husbands are murdered.

The cast includes Cara Gee, Melissa Farman and Tattiawna Jones. The first season began airing on 6 October 2014 and consists of 13 episodes.

CBC cancelled the series in March 2015 after one season. Strange Empire was broadcast on LMN in the US and was renamed Strange Empire: Rise of the Women, it premiered on May 29, 2015.

== Cast and characters ==
- Cara Gee as Kat Loving, a Métis woman who loses her child and her husband and struggles to protect her surrogate family.
- Melissa Farman as Rebecca Blithely, an autistic woman who was previously institutionalized and who now works as a doctor.
- Tattiawna Jones as Isabelle Slotter, a madam who is grieving after the loss of her child.
- Aaron Poole as John Slotter, a violent mine owner, who is married to Isabelle.
- Michelle Creber as Kelly and Matreya Scarrwener as Robin, sisters who are rescued and adopted by Kat Loving after their gambling father sells them to Slotter for use in his bordello.
- Terry Chen as Ling, a Chinese man looking to take over Slotter's coal mine.
- Anne Marie DeLuise as Mrs. Briggs, a widow who runs a cantine.
- Tahmoh Penikett as Marshal Caleb Mecredi, a Métis lawman who is attracted to Kat and determined to bring John Slotter to justice.
- Joanne Boland as Morgan Finn, a miner in the town who begins a relationship with Rebecca, while trying to hide that he's assigned female at birth.

== Episodes ==
No.	Title	Directed by	Written by	Original release date
1	"The Hunting Party"	Andy Mikita	Laurie Finstad-Knizhnik	October 6, 2014
2	"Buckskin Princess"	Mairzee Almas	Laurie Finstad-Knizhnik	October 13, 2014
3	"Other Powers"	Amanda Tapping	Laurie Finstad-Knizhnik	October 20, 2014
4	"The Whiskey Trader"	Andy Mikita	Laurie Finstad-Knizhnik & Leila Basen (screenplay) Maureen McKeon (story)	October 27, 2014
5	"Lonely Hearts"	Mike Rohl	Laurie Finstad-Knizhnik, Jacquie Gould(story editor)	November 3, 2014
6	"Electricity"	Mairzee Almas	Laurie Finstad-Knizhnik, Leila Basen, Jacquie Gould(story editor)	November 17, 2014
7	"The Oath"	Anne Wheeler	Laurie Finstad-Knizhnik, Jackie May, Jacquie Gould(story editor)	November 24, 2014
8	"How Far is Heaven"	Will Waring	Laurie Finstad-Knizhnik, Leila Basen, Jacquie Gould(story editor)	December 1, 2014
9	"The Resistance"	Will Waring	Laurie Finstad-Knizhnik, Penny Gummerson, Jacquie Gould(story editor)	December 8, 2014
10	"The Cage"	Anne Wheeler	Laurie Finstad-Knizhnik, Jackie May, Jacquie Gould(story editor)	January 12, 2015
11	"Confession"	Anne Wheeler	Laurie Finstad-Knizhnik, Jackie May, Jacquie Gould(story editor)	January 19, 2015
12	"End Days"	Gary Harvey	Laurie Finstad-Knizhnik, Jackie May, Jacquie Gould(story editor)	January 26, 2015
13	"The Dark Riders"	Gary Harvey	Laurie Finstad-Knizhnik, Jackie May, Jacquie Gould(story editor)	February 2, 2015

== Reception ==
The series premiere was watched by 319,000 Canadian viewers.

John Doyle of The Globe and Mail called it "a remarkable, rugged western drama" and praised the cast. Doyle concluded "Strange Empire wobbles a bit in episodes two and three, but never falls down. Watch and you are carried through on the freshness and zest of it, this dose of hard, rugged TV storytelling."

=== Canadian Screen Awards ===
Year	Category	Nominee	Result	Ref.
2016	Best Achievement in Casting	Jackie Lind	Nominated	
2016	Best Costume Design	Beverly Wowchuk	Nominated	
2016	Best Performance by an Actor in a Continuing Leading Dramatic Role	Aaron Poole	Nominated	
2016	Best Performance by an Actor in a Featured Supporting Role in a Dramatic Program or Series	Woody Jeffreys	Nominated	
2016	Best Photography in a Dramatic Program or Series	Bruce Worrall	Nominated	

=== Joey Awards ===
Year	Category	Nominee	Result	Ref.
2015	Best Actress in a TV Drama Leading Role	Matreya Scarrwener	Won	
2015	Best Actress in a TV Drama Leading Role	Michelle Creber	Nominated	
2015	Best Actress in a TV Drama Guest Starring Role Age 14-18 Years	Laine MacNeil	Nominated	

=== Leo Awards ===
Year	Category	Nominee	Result	Ref.
2015	Best Direction in a Dramatic Series	William Waring	Nominated	
2015	Best Cinematography in a Dramatic Series	Bruce Worrall	Won	
2015	Best Picture Editing in a Dramatic Series	Gordon Rempel	Nominated	
2015	Best Costume Design in a Dramatic Series	Beverley Wowchuk	Nominated	
2015	Best Casting in a Dramatic Series	Jackie Lind	Won	
2015	Best Guest Performance by a Male in a Dramatic Series	Luke Camilleri	Nominated	
2015	Best Supporting Performance by a Male in a Dramatic Series	Woody Jeffreys	Nominated	
2015	Best Supporting Performance by a Female in a Dramatic Series	Anne Marie DeLuise	Won	
2015	Best Supporting Performance by a Female in a Dramatic Series	Anja Savcic	Nominated	
2015	Best Supporting Performance by a Female in a Dramatic Series	Michelle Creber	Nominated	

=== Young Artist Awards ===
Year	Category	Nominee	Result	Ref.
2015	Best Performance in a TV Series - Guest Starring Young Actress 17-21	Laine MacNeil	Nominated	

== Home media release ==
eOne Films released season 1 on DVD on May 12, 2015.
