= Levels (film) =

- Film poster
- Directed by: Adam Stern
- Written by: Adam Stern
- Produced by: Kyle Bornais
- Starring: Cara Gee; Peter Mooney; Aaron Abrams; David Hewlett
- Cinematography: Rion Gonzales
- Edited by: Jamie Alain
- Music by: Adam Stern
- Production companies: Orbital Mechanics; Middle Child Films; Farpoint Films
- Distributed by: Vortex Media
- Release date: November 1, 2024
- Running time: 93 minutes
- Country: Canada
- Language: English

Levels is a 2024 science fiction action film written and directed by Adam Stern and starring Cara Gee, Peter Mooney, Aaron Abrams and David Hewlett.

== Cast ==
- Cara Gee as Ash
- Peter Mooney as Joe
- Aaron Abrams as Hunter
- David Hewlett as Oliver
- Amanda Tapping as MEL

== Reception ==
Richard Crouse concluded his review of the film by stating: "Stern’s messages of hope for the future of humankind are heartfelt but come packaged in a movie that lacks urgency." Chris Knight of Original Sin was very mixed about the film. Hopson Travis of Punch Drunk Critics found it was "an accomplished but unspectacular film that can’t hold a candle to more exciting films tackling AI." A review at Voices From the Balcony stated: "Unfortunately, despite characters constantly talking about the morality of shutting down the simulation and wiping out its population, Levels really doesn’t have much in the way of answers."
