= Generation gap =

Difference of opinions between generations

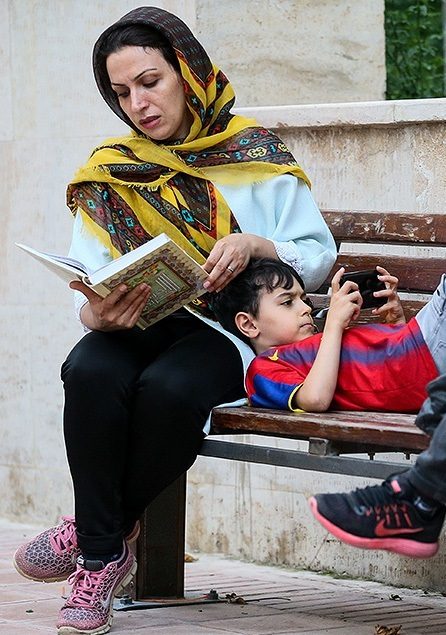
An Iranian woman reading a book while her son uses a mobile phone

A generation gap or generational gap is a difference in opinions and outlooks between one generation and another. These differences may relate to beliefs, politics, language, work, demographics and values. These differences can cause misunderstandings, disagreements, and difficulties in intergenerational relationships.

== History ==
John Protzko and Jonathan Schooler report that since 624 BC people have complained about the decline of the present generation of youth compared to earlier generations. They call this the "kids these days effect".

Early sociologists such as Karl Mannheim noted differences across generations in how the youth transits into adulthood, and studied the ways in which generations separate themselves from one another, in the home and in social situations and areas (such as churches, clubs, senior centers, and youth centers).

The sociological theory of a generation gap first came to light in the 1960s, when the younger generation (later known as baby boomers) seemed to differ in matters their parents had previously believed in terms of music, values, government and political views as well as cultural tastes. Sociologists now refer to the "generation gap" as "institutional age segregation". Usually, when any of these age groups is engaged in its primary activity, the individual members are physically isolated from people of other generations, with little interaction across age barriers except at the nuclear family level.

== Distinguishing generation gaps ==
There are several ways to make distinctions between generations. For example, names are given to major groups (Silent Generation, baby boomers, Generation X, millennials, Generation Z, Generation Alpha, and Generation Beta) and each generation sets its own trends and has its own cultural impact.

=== Language use ===
Generations can be distinguished by the differences in their language use. The generation gap has created a parallel gap in language, across which it can be difficult to communicate. This issue is one visible throughout society, creating complications within day-to-day communication at home, in the workplace, and in schools. As new generations seek to define themselves as something apart from the old, they adopt new lingo and slang, allowing a generation to create a sense of division from the previous one.

==== Slang ====
Slang is an ever-changing set of colloquial words and phrases that speakers use to establish or reinforce social identity or cohesiveness within a group or with a trend in society at large. As each successive generation of society struggles to establish its own unique identity among its predecessors, it can be determined that generational gaps provide a large influence over the continual change and adaptation of slang. As slang is often regarded as an ephemeral dialect, a constant supply of new words is required to meet the demands of the rapid change in characteristics. And while most slang terms maintain a fairly brief duration of popularity, slang provides a quick and readily available vernacular screen to establish and maintain generational gaps in a societal context.

==== Technological influences ====
Every generation develops new slang, but with the development of technology, understanding gaps have widened between the older and younger generations. "The term 'communication skills,' for example, might mean formal writing and speaking abilities to an older worker. But it might mean e-mail and instant-messenger savvy to a twenty-something." People often have private conversations in secret in a crowded room in today's age due to the advances of mobile phones and text messaging. Among "texters" a form of slang or texting lingo has developed, often keeping those not as tech-savvy out of the loop. "Children increasingly rely on personal technological devices like cell phones to define themselves and create social circles apart from their families, changing the way they communicate with their parents. Cell phones, instant messaging, e-mail, and the like have encouraged younger users to create their own inventive, quirky, and very private written language. That has given them the opportunity to essentially hide in plain sight. They are more connected than ever, but also far more independent. Text messaging, in particular, has perhaps become this generation's version of Pig Latin."

Technological innovations that have occurred between generations have made some skills obsolete: for example, shorthand (e.g. Gregg shorthand), a system of stenography often used in the 20th century to take notes and write faster using abbreviated symbols, rather than having to write each word. However, with new technology and the keyboard, newer generations no longer favour these older communication skills. Over 20 years ago, shorthand was taught in many high schools, but now students have rarely seen or even heard of it.

The transitions from each level of lifespan development have remained the same throughout history. They have all shared the same basic milestones in their travel from childhood, through midlife and into retirement. However, while the pathways remain the same—i.e. attending school, marriage, raising families, retiring—the actual journey varies not only with each individual but with each new generation.

In 2011, the National Sleep Foundation conducted a poll that focused on sleep and the use of technology; 95% of those polled admitted to using some form of technology within the last hour before going to bed at night. The study compared the difference in sleep patterns in those who watched TV or listened to music before bedtime, compared to those who used cell phones, video games and the Internet. The study looked at baby boomers, Generation Xers, Generation Yers (millennials), and Generation Zers. The research, as expected, showed generational gaps between the different forms of technology used. The largest gap was shown between texting and talking on the phone; 56% of Gen Zers and 42% of Gen Yers admitted to sending, receiving, and reading text messages every night within one hour before bedtime, compared to only 15% of Gen Xers, and 5% of baby boomers. Baby boomers were more likely to watch TV within the last hour before bedtime, 67%, compared to millennials, who came in at 49%. When asked about computer/internet use within the last hour before bedtime, 70% of those polled said they used a computer "a few times a week", and of those, 55% of the Gen Zers said they "surf the web" every night before bed.

==== Language brokering ====
Another aspect of language use which works to define a generation gap occurs within families in which different generations speak different primary languages. To help communicate within a family, "language brokerage" may be used: that is, the "interpretation and translation performed in everyday situations by bilinguals who have had no special training". In some immigrant families, the first generation speaks mainly their native tongue; the second generation speaks mainly the host language (i.e. that of the country in which they now live) while still retaining fluency in their parent's dominant language; and the third generation mainly uses the host language, and retain little or no conversational skills in their grandparents' native tongue. In such families, the second generation family members serve as interpreters not only to outside persons, but within the household, further propelling generational differences and divisions by means of linguistic communication.

In some immigrant families and communities, language brokering is also used to integrate children into family endeavors, and into civil society. Child Integration has become very important to form linkages between new immigrant communities and the predominant culture and new forms of bureaucratic systems. It also helps child development by learning, and pitching in.

==== Workplace attitudes ====
USA Today reported that younger generations are "entering the workplace in the face of demographic change and an increasingly multi-generational workplace". Multiple engagement studies show that the interests shared across the generation gap by members of this increasingly multi-generational workplace can differ substantially.

Researchers, who found evidence that millennials are relatively more confident in their abilities, speculate that they were 'buoyed by an educational system with inflated grades and standardized tests' and that this may complicate relations with colleagues of other generations.

Baby boomers, in contrast, were more idealistic. For them, work and personal dedication led to success. The introduction of working remotely or digitally was considered odd by them, and they continued to prefer face-to-face communication.

As for work, Generation X generally had a weaker work ethic and highly valued leisure. They typically had higher salaries than Baby Boomers. Compared to previous generations, Generation X had more individualistic values.

Millennials were part of an educational system with inflated grades and standardised tests, developing a need for frequent feedback from supervisors. Today, managers are doing more assessing and providing feedback on their millennial subordinates' productivity in their interactions to meet the need. Additionally, millennials' salaries and employee benefits are closely aligned with perceived personal success in an organization, where higher salaries and better benefits correlate with higher perceived success.

However, according to the engagement studies, mature workers and the new generations of workers share similar thoughts on a number of topics across the generation gap. Their opinions overlap on flexible working hours/arrangements, promotions/bonuses, the importance of computer proficiency, and leadership. Additionally, the majority of millennials and mature workers enjoy going to work every day and feel inspired to do their best.

In 2020, the NAS completed a literature review on workplace generational differences, looking at a variety of measures including job satisfaction, managers' perceptions, and personality. For a great deal of research, it reported that it was difficult to surmise whether an effect was a result of one's generation, or rather a result of a person's age (Note: 'Age' being distinct from 'generation'. For example, a pattern of behavior may be common to all individuals at age 25 regardless of whether they reach 25 in the 1990s, the 2000s, the 2010s, and so on.) or historical events/trends. Among research which accounted for this by following attitudes over time, the review found mild effects, writing, "individuals from the same 'generation' are just as likely to be different from one another as from individuals of different generations." Other researchers have drawn similar conclusions.

=== Generational consciousness ===
Generational consciousness is another way of distinguishing among generations that was developed by social scientist Karl Mannheim. Generational consciousness is when a group of people become mindful of their place in a distinct group identifiable by their shared interests and values. Social, economic, or political changes can bring awareness to these shared interests and values for similarly aged people who experience these events together and thereby form a generational consciousness. These types of experiences can impact individuals' development at a young age and enable them to begin making their own interpretations of the world based on personal encounters that set them apart from other generations.

=== Intergenerational living ===
"Both social isolation and loneliness in older men and women are associated with increased mortality, according to a 2012 Report by the National Academy of Sciences of the United States of America". Intergenerational living is one method being used worldwide as a means of combating such feelings. A nursing home in Deventer, The Netherlands, developed a program wherein students from a local university are provided small, rent-free apartments within the nursing home facility. In exchange, the students volunteer a minimum of 30 hours per month to spend time with the seniors. The students will watch sports with the seniors, celebrate birthdays, and simply keep them company during illnesses and times of distress. Programs similar to the Netherlands' program were developed as far back as the mid-1990s in Barcelona, Spain. In Spain's program, students were placed in seniors' homes, with a similar goal of free or cheap housing in exchange for companionship for the elderly. That program quickly spread to 27 other cities throughout Spain, and similar programs can be found in Lyon, France, and Cleveland, Ohio.

=== Demographics ===
To help sociologists understand the transition into adulthood of children of different generations, they compare the current generation to both older and earlier generations at the same time. Not only does each generation mature mentally and physically in their own ways, but they also create new aspects of attending school, forming new households, starting families, and even creating new demographics. The differences in demographics regarding values, attitudes, and behaviors between the two generations are used to create a profile for the emerging generation of young adults.

There is a large demographic difference between the baby boomer generation and earlier generations, which are less racially and ethnically diverse than the baby boomers. This also results in a growing cultural gap: baby boomers have generally higher education, with a higher percentage of women in the labor force and more often occupying professional and managerial positions.

== See also ==
- Achievement gap
- Ageism
- Digital divide
- Income gap
- Inter-generational contract
- Intergenerational equity
- List of generations
- Marriage gap
- Moral panic
- Student activism
- Student voice
- Transgenerational design
- Youth activism
- Youth voice
- Slang
- Technology
- Culture shock
