= Inhuman Condition (web series) =

Canadian web series

- Genre: Drama, supernatural
- Created by: R. J. Lackie
- Written by: R. J. Lackie
- Directed by: Jared Pelletier
- Starring: Torri Higginson; Cara Gee; Clara Pasieka; Thomas Antony Olajide
- Country of origin: Canada
- Original language: English
- No. of seasons: 1
- No. of episodes: 33

Production
- Executive producers: Jay Bennett; Christina Jennings; Scott Garvie
- Producers: Stephanie Ouaknine; Melanie Windle; Smokebomb Entertainment
- Cinematography: Kristofer Bonnell
- Editor: Ben Lawrence
- Running time: 3–16 minutes

Original release
- Network: KindaTV
- Release: July 4 – September 9, 2016

Inhuman Condition is a Canadian web series created and written by R. J. Lackie, directed by Jared Pelletier, and starring Torri Higginson. The series premiered on the KindaTV YouTube channel on 4 July 2016. The series takes place in a world where the supernatural is an accepted part of life, and follows the story of a therapist who focuses on supernatural patients. The series was selected for funding the Independent Production Fund in 2014.

The first season consisted of 33 three-to-sixteen minute episodes, which streamed on KindaTV.

== Plot ==
The series follows Dr. Michelle Kessler, a therapist who specializes in providing support to people with superhuman abilities, such as the anxious and vulnerable Tamar, whose mysterious and supernatural affliction lead her to accidentally murder 306 people as a child, and Clara, whose unique disease will eventually cause her to devolve into a zombie.

== Episodes ==
The first season of Inhuman Condition consisted of 33 episodes.

== Characters ==
=== Main ===
- Dr. Michelle Kessler (played by Torri Higginson) is the protagonist of Inhuman Condition.
- Tamar (played by Cara Gee)
- Clara Walker (played by Clara Pasieka)
- Robert "Linc" Lincoln (played by Thomas Antony Olajide)

=== Recurring ===
- William Bader (played by Shaun Benson)
- Graham (played by Robin Dunne)
- Mira (played by Niamh Wilson)
- Rachel (played by Angela Asher)
- Frank (played by Murray Urquhart)
- Cal Tulley (played by Wesley French)

== Reception ==
The series has been called "a step forward for the medium" of web series by Bloody Disgusting, and drew praise from AfterEllen and others.

At the 5th Canadian Screen Awards, the series received a nomination under the Digital Media category for Best Original Program or Series, Fiction.
