= Generation Beta =

Cohort succeeding Generation Alpha

Generation Beta, often shortened to Gen Beta, is the proposed name for the demographic cohort succeeding Generation Alpha. The name was coined by futurist and demographer Mark McCrindle, who also coined the name Generation Alpha. He defines the cohort as those born from 2025 to 2039, with this definition having been reported by numerous sources citing McCrindle.

McCrindle expects the generation's members to be primarily the children of younger Millennials and Generation Z.

== Terminology ==
The proposed term "Generation Beta" comes from the Greek letter beta, to follow Generation Alpha, named for the Greek letter alpha. Since the term "Beta" is sometimes used as an insult meaning someone who is weak or passive, some have suggested that a different name may prevail for the generation.

== Date range definitions ==
Since no official body determines generational boundaries, the starting year of this generation may be subject to future revision. Social generations typically span approximately 15 years and are shaped by major societal shifts.

Mark McCrindle, who coined the term Generation Beta, uses 2025 as the starting birth year and 2039 as the ending birth year, following Generation Alpha for which McCrindle uses a date range of 2010–2024.

However, deciding on a date range for Generation Beta is made difficult due to there being general disagreement over the ending year for the preceding Generation Alpha. Some sources have followed McCrindle's definition of the generations, putting the end year for Generation Alpha at 2024, including a World Economic Forum article which uses a birth year range of 2025–2038. Other sources have put the end year at 2021, implying that Generation Beta begins in 2022. Others, while they have not specified a range for Generation Alpha, have specified end years for Generation Z of 2012 or 2013, which suggests a later start date for Generation Beta. For example, the Annie E. Casey Foundation defines Generation Alpha as those born from 2013 to 2025, implying that Generation Beta starts in 2026. Psychologist Jean Twenge defines Generation Alpha as those born from 2013 to 2029, implying that Generation Beta starts in 2030. In any case, Generation Beta includes children to be born throughout the 2030s.

== Speculations ==
=== Demographics ===
Generation Beta will be impacted by declining birth rates, and, according to McCrindle, will likely make up around 16% of the world's population in 2035. McCrindle predicts Generation Beta to reach 2.1 billion people, surpassing Generation Alpha's 2 billion. McCrindle has suggested that Generation Beta will have a stronger appreciation for diversity than previous generations. It is expected that many members of Generation Beta will live to see the 22nd century with many members still in their working age as young as 62.

Generation Beta is expected to be one of the most urbanized generations in history with the World Economic Forum projecting that in 2040 that around 58% of the generation will live in cities. A rate higher than Gen Alpha's projected 53% and Gen Z's projected 45% at similar ages, it also projected that members of Gen Beta who grow up in developing countries will make a larger share of global spending compared to members in developed countries compared to previous generations. It also projects the population of Gen Beta to be overall smaller compared to other generations and will feature more people being born in Sub-Saharan Africa, compared to Asia-Pacific regions and regions in the rest of the world compared to previous generations.

=== Technology ===
According to McCrindle, members of Generation Beta will likely not only adapt to technologies but will immerse themselves in them from the outset more than any previous generation. Due to the large amount of technology that Generation Beta will grow up in, McCrindle suggests that Generation Z parents may prefer to shield their children from constant internet exposure. McCrindle has also said that Generation Beta will be characterised by significant technological integration, and experts have predicted that Generation Beta children will grow up immersed and integrated with artificial intelligence (AI). Some researchers theorize this integration will extend beyond functional use into the psychological realm, leading the cohort to develop what have been termed "fluid identity boundaries" with AI systems, forming deep emotional and intellectual attachments to them.

According to experts, misinformation and disinformation are likely to grow during Generation Beta's time due to growing political polarization and growing indistinguishability between real and AI-generated material. Attention spans are also expected to continue decreasing in Generation Beta children.

Lance Eliot from Forbes refers to Generation Beta as "AI naturals", claiming that, "[a]s youngsters, AI will merely naturally be integral to their upbringing. [...] No need to get excited about the fact that AI is always there and at the ready." He expects that Generation Beta "will be growing up during the anticipated rapid advancement of AI, including potentially the attainment of artificial general intelligence (AGI)".

=== Global issues ===
McCrindle has predicted that, due to having parents that care more about global issues, including climate change, Generation Beta will be more focused on these issues.

== See also ==
- List of generations
- Generation gap
