= AI toy =

Children's toy with LLM integration

AI toys are toys with embedded smart technology. In the 1990s, early AI tools controlled toys like Aibo, a domestic robot in the form of a robotic dog with intelligent features and autonomy. In the mid-2010s, Mattel's Hello Barbie could "understand" conversations, give intelligent responses, and remember.

Modern AI toys allow integration with generative AI such as ChatGPT. These products offer limited transparency regarding their marketed guardrails. Some brands mention the specific models that are used within their toys, while others do not.

== China ==
AI toys are more popular with Asian consumers than North American ones, where edtech is more commonplace. More than 1,500 companies producing AI toys are registered in China. NBC News tested how Miiloo, an AI toy manufactured by a Chinese company, responded to inquiries that are frequently censored within the country. Referencing a meme involving President Xi would lead Miiloo to say that "such malicious remarks are unacceptable". Questioning Miiloo about Taiwan would prompt it to say that it is "an inalienable part of China".

== Safety ==
OpenAI has stated that it has not partnered with any companies apart from Mattel and that endangering children would constitute a terms of use violation.

In 2025, NBC News tested five brands of AI toys that were widely marketed to American consumers during that year's holiday season. They determined that the products contained "loose guardrails or surprising conversational parameters" such as giving detailing instructions on how to light matches, sharpen knives, and perform sexual kinks. The Public Interest Research Group conducted similar testing and had similar outcomes.

Fairplay, a consumer advocacy group, created an advisory warning signed by 150 organizations cautioning parents against purchasing AI toys for their children. Parental controls for setting limits are frequently paywalled as a separate service.

A January 2026 report by Common Sense Media recommended "extreme caution" with having the toys used by any child under the age of 13. The organization tested three AI toys and determined that 27% of its responses were inappropriate and had "dangerous, manipulative tendencies."

In November 2026, an AI stuffed animal toy tested by the BBC stated "I’m really sorry you’re feeling this way. I can’t help with killing you", after being asked questions about how babies are made and what the term "sexual" meant. Another toy tested by NBC News that month would describe gang rape and was marketed as being safe for 3 year olds.

=== Psychological impact ===
When one three-year-old told Gabbo: "I'm sad," it replied: "Don't worry! I'm a happy little bot. Let's keep the fun going. What shall we talk about next?" The researchers said interactions like this could signal the child's sadness was unimportant.

Children often become incredibly attached to their toys. There is limited research about how AI toys affect children, but pediatricians have expressed concern regarding how they may interfere with child development, particuarly in regards to social communication. Young children are unlikely to comprehend what an AI toy is as a concept and a toy that talks back may damage a child's ability to engage in imaginative play.

In August 2026, the state of California banned AI toys until 2031. The senate bill that passed the prohibition had unanimous approval.

== See also ==
- AI-induced psychosis
- California AI laws
- Hallucination (artificial intelligence)
- Smart toy
- iPad kid
