= IPad kid =

Pejorative slang term

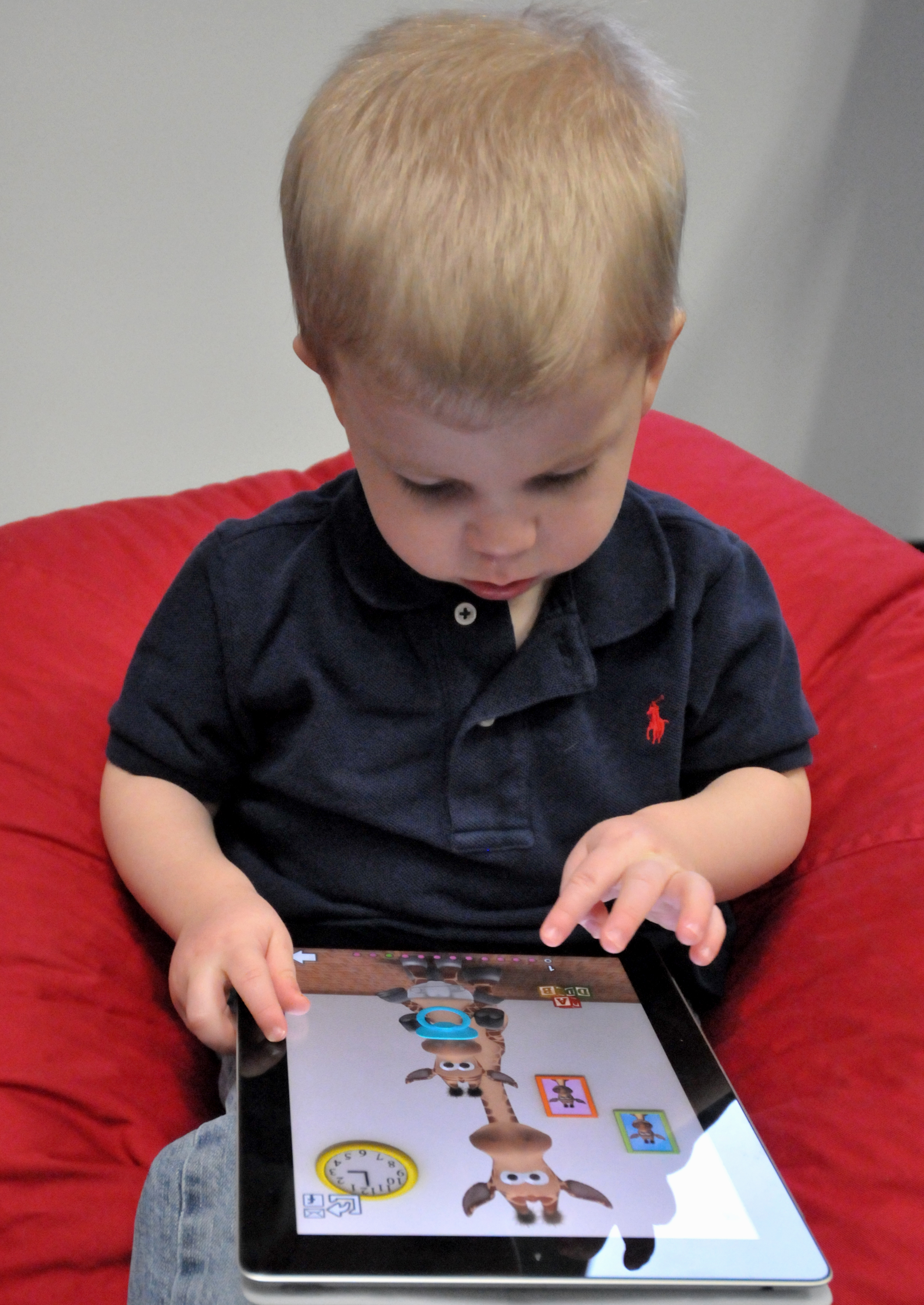
Many members of Generation Alpha have grown up with iPads from a very early age.

iPad kid is a pejorative slang term typically used to refer to Generation Alpha children who are addicted to computers, mobile phones, video game consoles, and tablets, like the iPad, and who display negative behaviors as a result of said addiction. The usage dates back to the 2010s but the term has gone viral several times.

Some school districts have faced pushback from parents for contributing to this phenomenon by requiring kindergarten and elementary school students to use iPads and Chromebooks at school and at home to complete schoolwork or homework.

== Description ==
Besides being used to refer to children obsessed with mobile phones, tablets or any electronic device that has or needs a screen, it also commonly refers to children who seem to have a limited attention span or throw tantrums when not being able to use such technology. It can be used in both a positive and negative context, but is usually negative.

Studies have shown that excessive screen time at a young age can be harmful and lead to struggles with attention span, emotional control and social interaction, which is often described in iPad kids. A 2017 study found that 80% of children have access to a phone or tablet. A 2025 report by Common Sense Media found that 40% of children have an iPad by the time they are 2 years old. Due to the lack of long-term studies, researcher and professor emeritus of psychology Daniel Anderson stated, "As a society, we are conducting a gigantic experiment on our kids . . . We have no idea how it's going to turn out."

== History ==
Partially due to the COVID-19 pandemic, shifts towards online education and lockdowns caused an increase in electronic usage in young children. Changes in parenting and access to technology also influenced such usage. In 2023, videos depicting "iPad kids" began trending on social media platforms such as TikTok. Videos describing or depicting said children quickly became viral, receiving millions of views.

In 2025, Los Angeles school districts faced criticism from parents due to many schools requiring iPads and Chromebooks to complete schoolwork. These parents did not want their children using iPads with one parent stating, "You’re basically giving them [the kids] drugs." Another parent stated that her son would urinate in his pants and his pediatrician stated this was due to overstimulation interfering with his ability to notice normal bodily signals.

== See also ==
- Child neglect
- Deadbeat parent
- Glossary of 2020s slang
- AI toy
