= Cara Gee =

Canadian actress (born 1983)

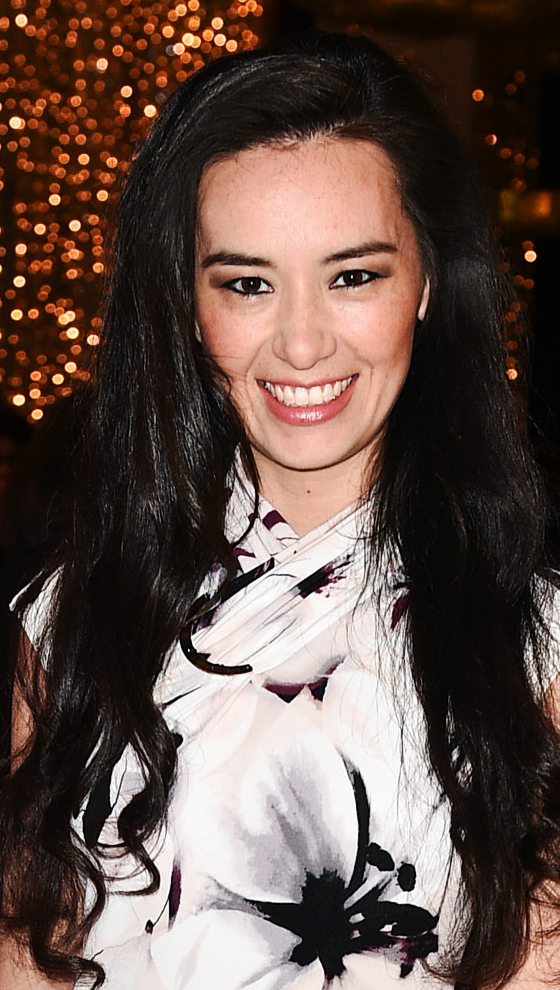
- Gee at CFC Annual Gala in 2018
- Born: July 18, 1983 (age 43); Calgary, Alberta, Canada
- Occupation: Actress
- Years active: 2011–present
- Spouse: Richard de Klerk (m. 2019)

Cara Gee (born July 18, 1983) is a Canadian film, television, and stage actress. She is known for her roles in the television series Strange Empire and The Expanse. She is described by Forbes as "one of the most prominent indigenous women in the entertainment industry".

== Early life and education ==
Cara Gee was born on July 18, 1983, in Calgary, Alberta, and was raised near Bobcaygeon, before moving to Newmarket, Ontario. Gee is Ojibwe, one of the largest indigenous populations in Canada. She attended Huron Heights Secondary School where she became interested in drama. She had organized local punk shows and was planning to pursue arts management when she discovered a love of acting. Subsequently, she enrolled in the University of Windsor and graduated with Bachelor of Fine Arts in 2007.

== Career ==
Gee is primarily known as a stage actress in Toronto, Ontario, where her acting credits have included productions of Margaret Atwood's The Penelopiad, Daniel MacIvor's Arigato, Tokyo, Cliff Cardinal's Stitch, Birdtown and Swanville's 36 Little Plays About Hopeless Girls and Louise Dupré's Tout comme elle. Tomson Highway's The Rez Sisters

She made her feature film debut in Empire of Dirt for which she was nominated for a Canadian Screen Award. For this role, she also won a Special Jury award at the 2013 Toronto International Film Festival as well as an award for Best Actress at the American Indian Film Festival. In 2013, at TIFF, Gee was named one of the festival's annual Rising Stars.

Gee began work on television playing guest roles in the television series King and Republic of Doyle. In 2014, she starred as one of the lead characters in the Western drama series Strange Empire on CBC Television, for one season until it was cancelled in 2015. As of 2016, Gee stars in the 33-episode web series Inhuman Condition, which airs on the KindaTV YouTube channel.

From 2017 to 2022 she played the role of Camina Drummer on the Syfy/Amazon television series The Expanse. Her indigenous origin has attracted media attention repeatedly around matters of representation of minorities, especially with narratives in The Expanse regarding cultural assimilation. Gee's portrayal of Camina Drummer has been strongly praised.

== Personal life ==
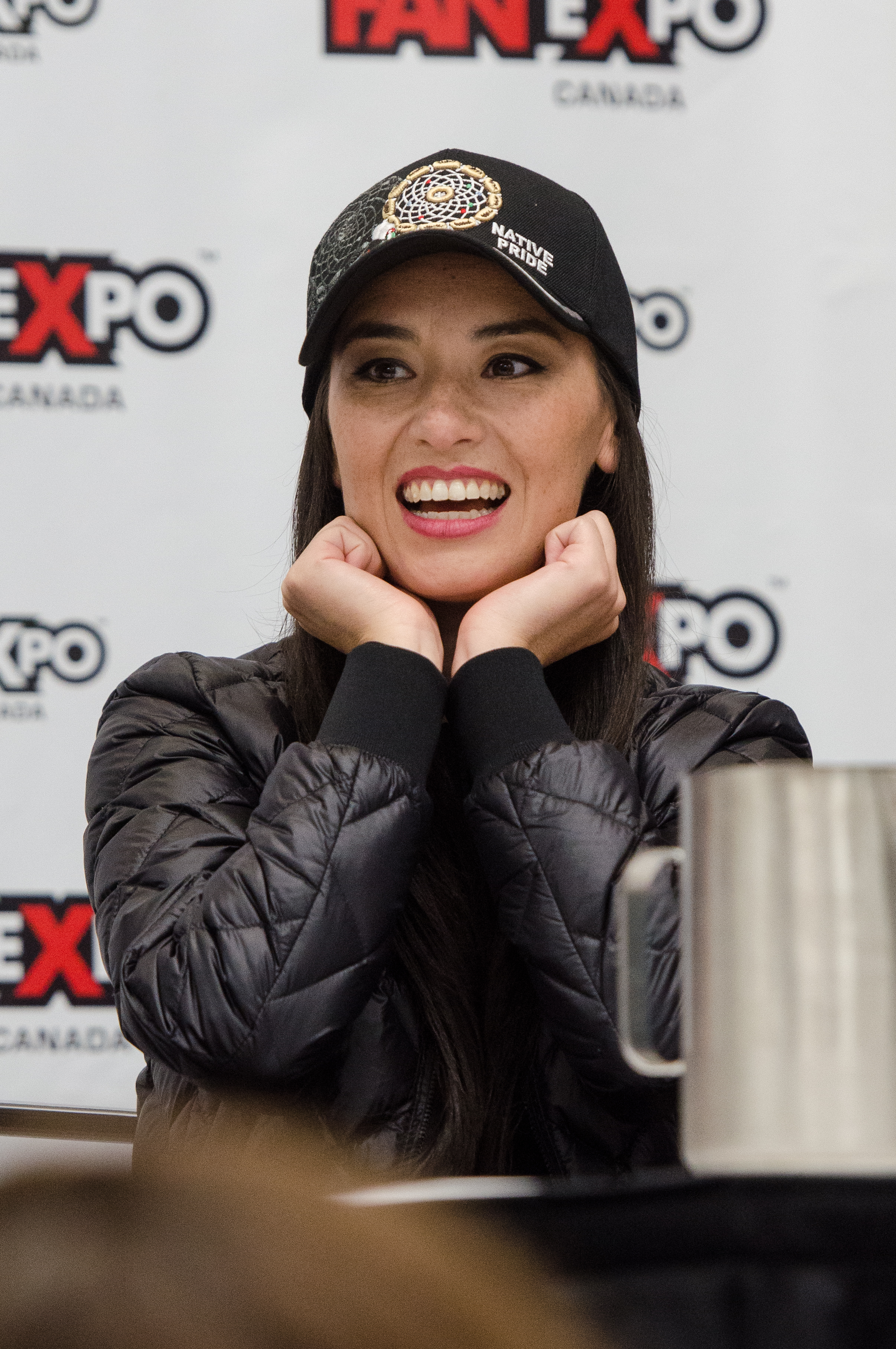
Gee in 2018

Gee married Richard de Klerk, who played her husband on the CBC television series Strange Empire, in 2019. Gee was eight months pregnant while filming the fifth season of The Expanse.

== Filmography ==
=== Films ===
Year	Title	Role	Notes
2010	Gingerlip Kids	Sharon Taylor	Short film
2013	The Cycle of Broken Grace	Prostitute	Short film
2013	Empire of Dirt	Lena Mahikan	
2015	We Think it Belongs In The Sea	Lynne Ann	Short film
2016	Anne Darling	Charlie	Short film
2017	Sundowners	Jenny	
2017	The Carmilla Movie	Emily Brontë	
2017	We Forgot to Break Up	Isis Wong	Short film
2018	Birdland	Hazel James	
2018	Trouble in the Garden	Raven, Pippa	
2018	Red Rover	Phoebe	
2019	Home in Time	Skylar	Short film
2019	Bitter Smoke	Opichi	Short film
2019	EXT	Aegis Minamoto	Short film
2019	It's Nothing	The Girl	Short film
2020	Alone Wolf	Town Monroe	
2020	The Call of the Wild	Françoise	
2022	Bones of Crows	Percy Whallach	
2024	Levels	Ash	

=== Television series ===
Year	Title	Role	Notes
2012	King	Alicia Pratta	Episode: "Alicia Pratta" (no. 18)
2013	Republic of Doyle	Sydney Morrison	Episode: "Brothers in Arms" (no. 61)
2014	Darknet	Gemma	Episode: "Darknet 4" (no. 4)
2014–2015	Strange Empire	Kat Loving	Leading role; 13 episodes
2016	Inhuman Condition	Tamar	Main role; web series; 11 episodes
2017	The Neddeaus of Duqesne Island		Web series; episode: "The Mainland" (no. 10)
2017	Letterkenny	Shyla	Episode: "Way to a Man's Heart" (no. 23)
2017–2022	The Expanse	Camina Drummer	Recurring role (seasons 2–3); main role (seasons 4–6); 42 episodes
2018	Wynter	Coyote	Television film
2021	The Expanse: One Ship	Camina Drummer	Episode: "Ankawala" (no. 1)
2023	Extrapolations	Freda	Episode: "2037: A Raven Story" (no. 1)
2024	Sweet Tooth	Siana	Main role

=== Video games ===
Year	Title	Role	Notes	Ref.
2023	The Expanse: A Telltale Series	Camina Drummer	Voice	

== Awards and nominations ==
Gee garnered a Canadian Screen Award nomination for Best Actress at the 2nd Canadian Screen Awards for her performance in Empire of Dirt. For this role, she also won a Special Jury Award at the 2013 Toronto International Film Festival, as well as an award for Best Actress at the American Indian Film Festival.
