= Impact of the COVID-19 pandemic on children =

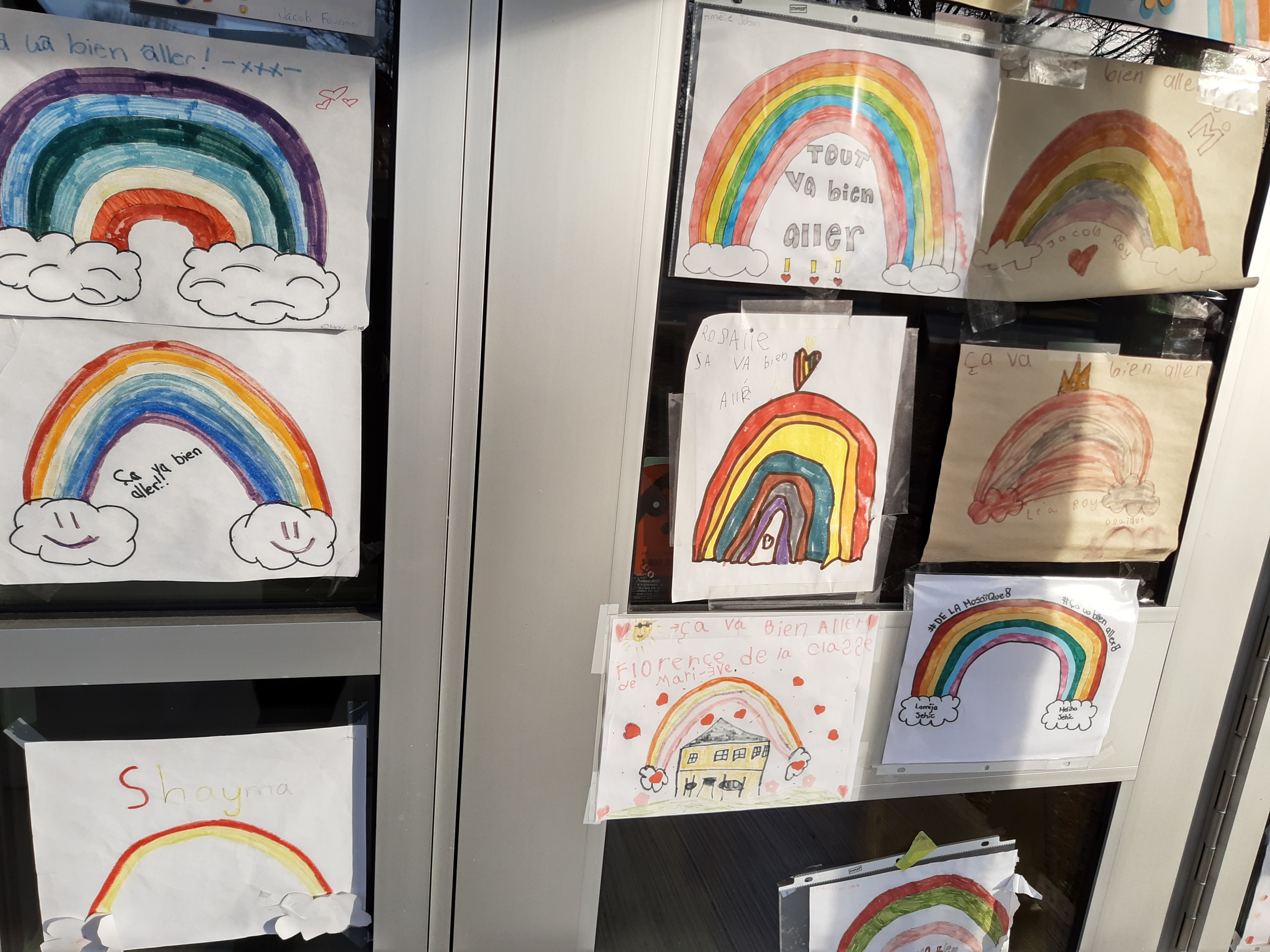
Optimistic drawings by children in Quebec, April 2020. Some use the phrase "Ça va bien aller", a slogan which translates to "everything will be all right".

A systematic review notes that children with COVID-19 have milder effects and better prognoses than adults. However, children are susceptible to "multisystem inflammatory syndrome in children" (MIS-C), a rare but life-threatening systemic illness involving persistent fever and extreme inflammation following exposure to the SARS-CoV-2 virus.

As a vulnerable population, children and youth may be affected by COVID-19 pandemic policies implemented, including education, mental health, safety, and socioeconomic stability; the infection of the virus may lead to separation or loss of their family. As with many other crises, the COVID-19 pandemic may compound existing vulnerabilities and inequalities experienced by children. This was especially true when it comes to mental health.

== Illness ==
When a child is infected with COVID-19, they are more likely to have an asymptomatic case, or one that is mild to moderate in severity. The prevalence of long COVID in children is estimated at 1% vs 6-7% in adults.

Children are more likely to experience gastrointestinal symptoms than adults. Children are less likely to become hospitalized than adults.

Several explanations contributing to the milder COVID-19 symptoms experienced, in the acute phase, by children have been suggested, including:

- a lower expression of ACE-2 (the receptor used by SARS-CoV-2 for cell entry) in the respiratory tract in younger children
- viral interference (e.g. by other coronaviruses)
- cross-reactive immune responses (e.g. antibodies, CD8^{+} and/or CD4^{+} T-cells reactive to other viral antigens than of SARS-CoV-2)
- some protection offered from an increased Th2-response

The most common symptoms among children include fever symptoms, followed by a dry cough. Other commonly reported symptoms among children include nasal congestion or runniness, fatigue, and headache.

Severe illness is possible. In some instances respiratory support (such as a ventilator) may be required. Some children have experienced multiple organ failure. Such severe or critical cases were most common among children with certain underlying conditions, such as for example, asthma or those with weakened immune systems. Overall, Children are associated with lower mortality rates than other age groups, when infected with COVID-19.

Some children who become infected develop a rare condition known as MIS-C, short for "multisystem inflammatory syndrome in children". This causes a persistent fever and extreme inflammation. Other symptoms associated with MIS-C include severe abdominal pain and hypotension.

Early into the pandemic, dermatologists reported an increase in chilblains-like lesions in children, especially on their feet, fingers, and toes. It has been informally referred to as "COVID toes". This was presumed related to COVID-19 infection, however confirming that a child has been infected can be difficult.

== Education ==
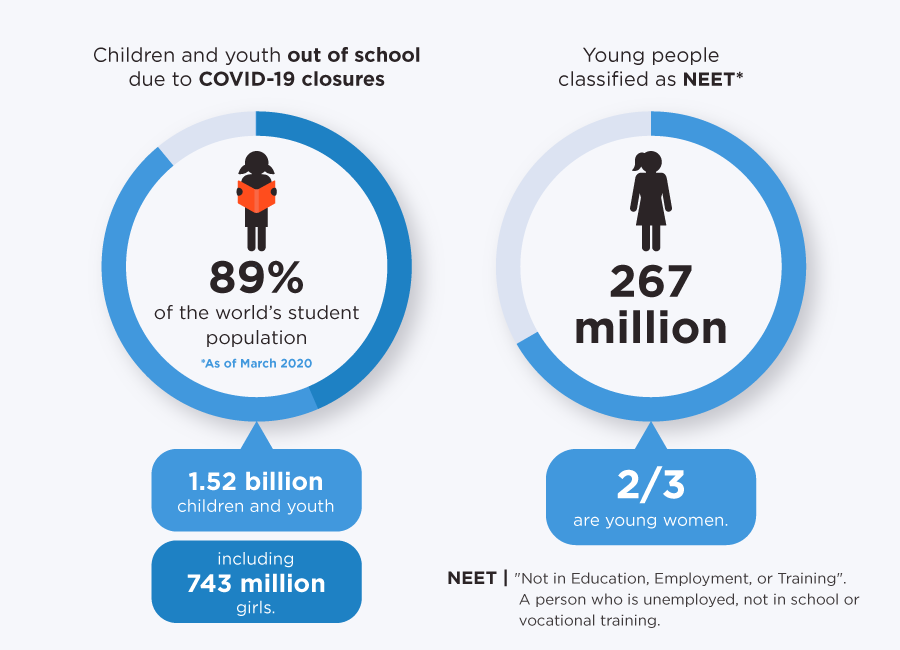
Graphic chart of children and youth out of school due to COVID-19 closures, and young people classified as NEET

=== School closures ===
By the end of March 2020, UNESCO estimated that over 89% of the world's student population was out of school or university due to closures aimed at mitigating the spread of COVID-19.

=== Gender disparity ===
This disproportionately affected girls, with 111 million girls living in areas in which getting an education is already a struggle due to extreme poverty, economic vulnerability steep cultural and legal gender disparities. For instance, closures have forced over 4 million girls out of school in South Sudan, Niger, and Mali, some of the countries with low enrollment and completion rates for girls.

Girls in refugee camps were already only half as likely as their male peers to enroll in secondary schools, and now school closures will affect them further as historically, school closures had caused a high proportion of girls to drop-outs and not return for reasons such as increased domestic and caretaker responsibilities.

Additionally, several studies found that school closures increased girls vulnerability to physical and sexual abuse both by older men and by their peers, as girls were often are at home alone and unsupervised.

Furthermore, frequency of transactional sex rose, due to families struggling to cover basic needs. As family breadwinners died and livelihoods were destroyed, many families either sold sex with their daughters, or sold them off as a child bride.

There was concern that the Covid crisis could be similar to the Ebola crisis in Sierra Leone, in which adolescent pregnancy increased by up to 65% in some communities. At that time, "most girls reported this increase was a direct result of being outside the protective environment provided by schools. Many of these girls never returned to the classroom, largely due to a recently revoked policy preventing pregnant girls from attending school."

=== Global Context ===
According to UNICEF, at the peak of the pandemic, 188 countries imposed countrywide school closures, affecting more than 1.6 billion children and youth.

At least 1 in 3 of the world's school children – 463 million children globally – were unable to access remote learning when COVID-19 shuttered their schools. This raised concerns regarding the social, economic, and educational impacts of protracted school closures on students.

In addition, school closures disproportionately affect children from low-income or minority families, children with disabilities, and young women, due to disparities in access to distance education, unequal distribution of increased child-care and domestic responsibilities. Additional concerns surrounded the fact that school subsidized meal programs and vaccinations are cornerstones of child healthcare for many families.

For example, school closures during the 2014–2016 Ebola outbreak in West Africa increased school dropouts, rates of child labor, violence against children, and teen pregnancies.

The Ofsted report conducted by the UK government stated that some children at every age group had regressed in their skills, but some had thrived. Inspectors found one large difference between children who struggled and children who thrived was that those who did well have good support structures and have benefited from quality time with families and caregivers. The report also found a rise in homeschooling even when schools were opened back up, with families concerned about the virus.

When commenting on that report, Amanda Spielman, the UK's chief inspector of schools, asserted that "loneliness, boredom and misery became 'endemic' among youngsters while their physical and mental health went into decline." She also believed some young children had fallen behind in their language skills, struggled to interact with their peers socially and lost physical dexterity and confidence through a lack of practice while confined to their homes.

=== Impact on student life globally ===
In a study of 30,383 students from 62 countries, students said overall they were most satisfied with the support provided by teaching staff and their universities' public relations. However, researchers argue that "deficient computer skills and the perception of a higher workload prevented them from perceiving their own improved performance in the new teaching environment."

Some students reported feeling boredom, anxiety, and frustration during the first lockdown in 2020. Students also reported higher satisfaction with the role played by hospitals and universities during the epidemic compared to the governments and banks.

During the lockdown, students primarily raised concerns about their future professional career.

Socio-demographic (and geographic) factors also played an important role in the students' perception of different aspects of academic work/life. The empirical results suggest that the transition from onsite to online lectures due to the COVID-19 crisis had a stronger effect on males, especially part-time students, undergraduate students, applied sciences students, students with a lower living standard, and students in Africa and Asia when it came to low satisfaction of their academic work and life.

When it came to students who were female, full-time, undergraduate, they were more likely to have low satisfaction or negative impacts in their emotional life and personal circumstances.

The results also demonstrate that more hopeful and less bored students, students who were more satisfied with their academic work/life, social science students, students with a better living standard (with a scholarship and/or the ability to pay the overall costs of study), and those who were studying in Europe showed greater satisfaction with the role and measures of their university during the COVID-19 crisis.

A Reuters national survey conducted in the US indicated serious mental health consequences resulting from school shutdowns and the pandemic. This affected both students and their teachers. 90% of school districts surveyed said that their district was experiencing higher "absenteeism or disengagement", and 74% of districts indicated increasing mental stress among students.

== Health and development ==
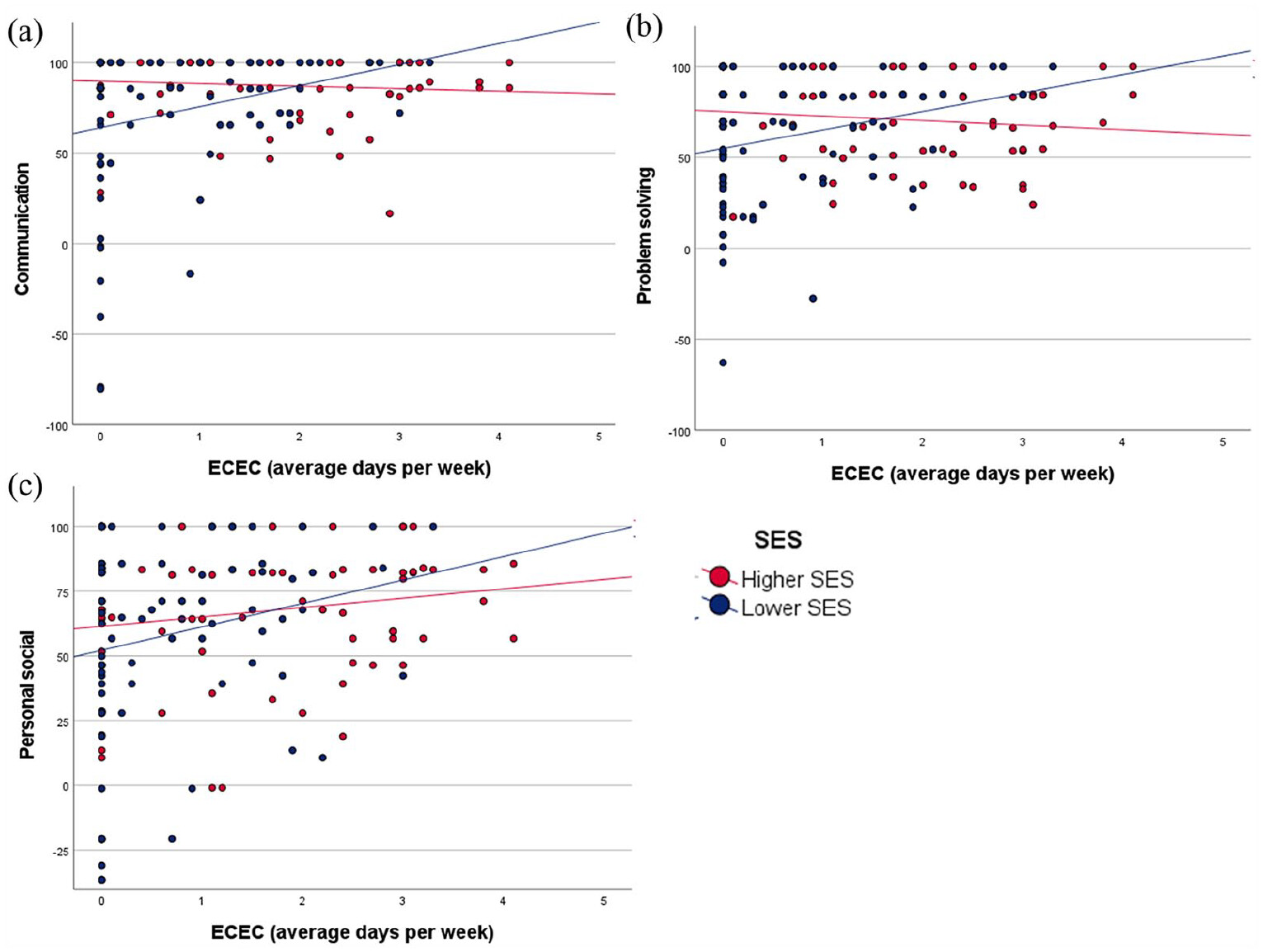
Children's 'school readiness' data showed that the more time they spent in ECEC, the better their personal-social skills. Plus, for children from disadvantaged backgrounds, the more time at ECEC, the better their communication and problem-solving skills

Increased stress for parents and caretakers, risk of infection, and social isolation threaten the health and development of children, and can contribute to adverse childhood experiences. Stressful pressures such as these can negatively impact a child's neurological development, especially in infancy or early childhood, including as a contributor to depression in adulthood. Academics have expressed concern that the development of infants which spent much of the first year of their lives in particular under lockdown may have been hampered by reduced social contact.

Research published in 2023 has investigated the extent to which education and care for young children has maintained its established positive associations with the development of language and executive functions during the first year of the pandemic. Addressing concerns about 'school readiness', the research found that sustained attendance was positively associated with language development, problem-solving skills and personal-social development of children despite the disruption to early years settings during the pandemic.

A report in The Lancet indicated that the COVID-19 would indirectly result in elevated maternal deaths and infant mortality, due to disrupted access to healthcare and food. According to the report, "Our least severe scenario ... over 6 months would result in 253,500 additional child deaths and 12,200 additional maternal deaths." Children risk losing caregivers to COVID-19. The pandemic and its consequences can cause decreased access to resources such as water, social work or medical care for vulnerable populations. Poverty among children has increased. In 2020, it was projected that approximately 150 million additional children would be living in multidimensional poverty – without access to education, health care, housing, nutrition, sanitation or water – due to the COVID-19 pandemic, according to an analysis jointly carried out by Save the Children and UNICEF. Long-term physical inactivity resulting from social distancing and lockdown measures result in less physical fitness for children, including higher childhood obesity and disruption of sleep patterns. Lack of physical access to school resources can also heighten food insecurity for poor students.

Additional millions of children worldwide are expected by UNICEF to experience food insecurity and malnourishment. An additional 6-7 million children under 5 may have suffered from wasting or acute malnutrition in 2020. Stunting among the poorest children went 2.4 times higher, and the poorest children also had poorer diet. UNICEF reports that 132 million people may have gone hungry in 2020, of that 44 million are children. Countries reported increased food insecurity, e.g. in Lebanon, the percentage of people worried about not having enough food rose from 31% in 2018 to 50% in 2020. Immunization efforts regarding diseases other than COVID-19 have been impacted, which will increase child deaths. According to UNICEF, over 94 million children were expected to miss measles shots, and an increase in HIV infections among children was expected if health services were disrupted. Stillbirths are expected to increase, due to disrupted access to health services. Similarly, disruptions to service may have resulted in 160 million children under 5 missing a crucial dose of Vitamin A.

=== Mental health ===
Children around the world have been affected by the pandemic and lockdown in several ways. Some children count on the right support and resources, making the situation manageable, while others strive to keep up with school activities in this new reality. School closures made children face considerable challenges to learn at home. Children in families that cannot afford resources for home learning activities, where parents have low levels of educational attainment, or where there is inadequate space for effective learning, have definitely fallen behind during this period. Many parents expressed that online learning was difficult for their child, particularly preschoolers and young children, and it was challenging for parents to support children appropriately while juggling work and other childcare demands. A few parents mentioned they were unable to support their child's remote learning since they did not know the information themselves.

"Our 2nd grader is not engaged with learning, and we don't have time to fully commit to helping him. We do the minimum with assignments and Zoom school, but nothing extra. We don't have the energy or time. It has been extremely hard to balance work and Zoom school and we worry about his education—mostly reading and his lack of attachment to his teachers and friends."—Mother of Native Hawaiian Pacific Islander K-5th grader

Studies performed in past epidemics, such as SARS, Ebola virus and MERS have shown a high prevalence of negative psychological effects not only in children, but also in adults. The same is going on with COVID-19 pandemic and while confined in quarantine, according to research, pandemics can have negative effects on children's mental health, but to a lesser extent, both in terms of internal symptoms (e.g., anxiety or depression) and external symptoms (e.g., behavioural disorders, hyperactivity) and the prevalence of anxiety disorders (20.5%) and depression (25.2%) was observed to be twice as high as pre-pandemic estimates. However, some studies suggested mental health improved in children during lockdown, with an overall reduction in anxiety, and an increase in wellbeing in those aged 13–14.

Drug and alcohol abuse among minors fell during the pandemic, as did arrests. Mental health visits saw a 24% increase for children ages 5 to 11, and 31% for older minors. Many children became more vulnerable to mental health conditions such as depression and anxiety due to the pandemic and its consequences, among which social isolation has been a contributing factor to a decline in mental health quality. Zanonia Chiu, a psychologist from Hong Kong, said about depressed children: "Now that schools are closed, some lock themselves up inside their rooms for weeks, refusing to take showers, eat, or leave their beds." Increased rates of domestic violence were reported during the pandemic, and this has included an elevated risk of child abuse internationally. As of 2023, UNICEF reported that 66% of countries reported a COVID-19-induced disruption in services relating to violence against children.

Apart from psychological problems, there is evidence that the lockdown has also had an impact on children and adolescents' cognition and social abilities. Studies from Europe suggest that the COVID-19 pandemic has impacted families caring for children with intellectual and developmental disabilities (IDDs) even more than the pandemic has impacted the general population. Parents of children with mental and physical disabilities were more likely to report changes in their child's behaviour, such as distractibility, inability to concentrate, irritability and general discomfort.

Impact on children and adolescents

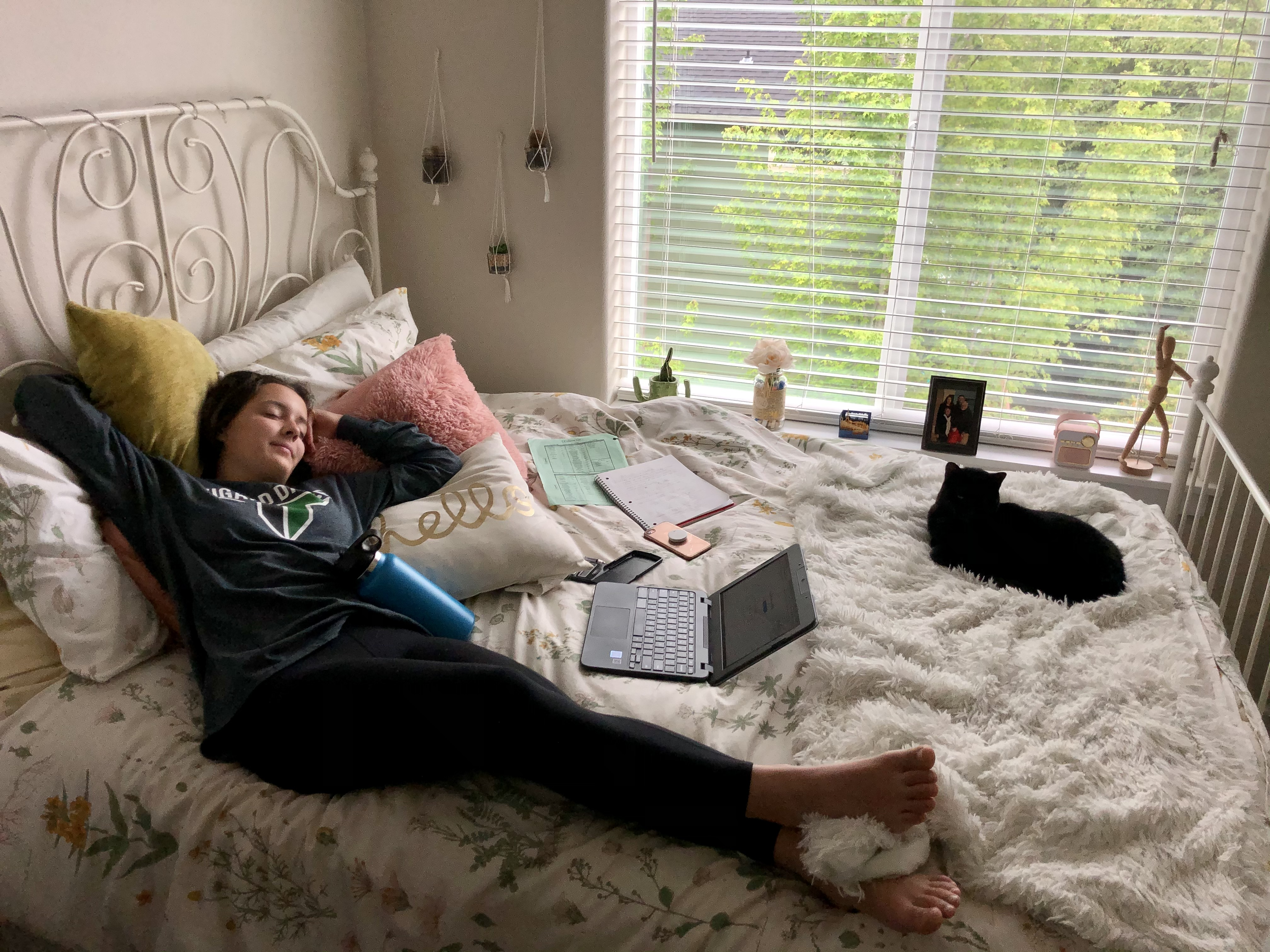
Student taking an online class in USA

Many young people who use mental health services are already unable to access essential mental health support. Sessions have been replaced with online or telephone support or even postponed. Some young people may find this less effective or may worry about maintaining privacy if sessions are held remotely with family members close by. Apart from these challenges and difficulties, lockdown and social distancing have also impacted particular populations. In the research "Professionals' perspectives on the effects of COVID-19 on autistic individuals", it is stated that individuals with autism spectrum disorder are at heightened risk of experiencing difficulties coping with the pandemic and resultant measures. Students with autism have to struggle with abrupt changes to course delivery and mentorship programmes due to school closures. Many individuals with autism require support, yet services have been paused temporarily. Some individuals with autism spectrum disorder stated that the lockdown had meant they could engage in hobbies more easily, yet the loss of routines and activities was considered difficult and stressful.

Lockdown was deemed to have impacted on individuals with autism spectrum disorder's educations, social lives, activities and health. For some, abrupt changes to education had been unexpectedly beneficial; for example, not attending school was better for their mental health, resulting in less anxiety managing their own school work. Social distancing made them also feel relieved since they have enjoyed not having the pressure to socialize. Lockdown was described as useful as they could choose their day-to-day routines around food and personal hobbies. However, some individuals with autism spectrum disorder have found studying at home problematic, they had difficulties meeting with friends and family as they would wish, some of them have experienced difficulties keeping to a structured routine and filling their daily routines with meaningful activities. They had regressed in their progress due to being unable to leave the house.

The marked uncertainty of the pandemic and associated disruptions in routine may be also particularly deleterious for children with IDD, who often benefit from heightened structure, clear expectations and an array of services, and may have difficulty understanding changes necessitated by COVID-19.

Children and adolescents may also experience mental health problems due to the COVID-19 pandemic itself, such as increased anxiety, as they might fear that they or their loved ones will get infected or they might worry about the future of the world. Significantly more children reported severe anxiety and severe sleep-related impairment during the COVID-19 lockdown than before COVID-19. The results of this study confirm the suspicions of child and youth care professionals that the COVID-19 lockdown has negative effects on the mental and social health of children and adolescents. In opinion papers, professionals elaborated on the vulnerability of this group and expected more feelings of loneliness, anxiety and depression, as well as a more tense atmosphere at home. Concerns were also expressed that the COVID-19 lockdown would lead to an increase in inequality and that children and families with lower socioeconomic status would be more susceptible to mental health issues. Although this study could not definitely confirm these concerns, children from single-parent families, from families with three or more children, and with parents who had a negative change in work situation reported more mental and social health problems during the COVID-19 lockdown. This study showed that children and adolescents reported poorer mental and social health during the COVID-19 lockdown compared to before and exposed several risk factors for poor mental and social health.

Other research highlights the importance of other highly impacted aspects, such as violence, situations of uncertainty, fear or anxiety, the risk of children having physical problems derived from a rise in sedentariness, in time in front of the screens, in unhealthy diets and in the detriment of sleep quality. Those situations can intensify during quarantine and provoke an increase in obesity and a loss of the cardiorespiratory capacity.

There is concern over the exclusion of children without digital access and other resources that supported their learning during quarantine. Evidence suggests that there has been a deficit in curriculum coverage and half of parents were engaged with their children's home learning. This represents a concern among teachers since the variability in engagement with the curriculum will potentially have different effects on the development and mental health of students.

Relevant findings in different countries

There is also evidence that shows some children are having poor speech development as a result of lack of social contact with peers, social distancing and the wearing of face masks.

The English Endowment Foundation has collected Data from 50,000 pupils and carried out a survey of schools across England that have shown an increased number of four- and five-year-olds needing help with language. Some of the results were that 96% said pupils starting school in September 2020 needed more support with communication than in previous years. This research is one of the first to also provide evidence about the extent of learning loss as the result of school closures. This study found that the overall performance in both mathematics and reading were significantly lower in comparison to the children's performance on standardisation samples in 2017. These primary findings are part of an ongoing research which plans to collect further data until September 2021.

Even though children and adolescents were not highly affected by the pandemic, social isolation measures had an impact on them. A prospective, descriptive and cross sectional study funded by the National University of Comahue in San Carlos de Bariloche, Argentina, which assessed changes in the sleeping habits, screen use, sports-related activities, eating and medical consultation stated that lockdown produced an emotional and behavioural impact on children and adolescents. The emotional and behavioural changes include boredom, irritability, reluctance, anger and changes in sleep pattern. What is more, the use of screens in their leisure time increased by 3 hours on weekdays. The type of physical activities also changed: swimming and team sports changed to biking, walking and skiing.

A study carried out in Italy and Spain stated that parents noticed emotional behavioural changes in their children during confinement. However, in Italy 83.8% of parents noticed those changes, while in Spain, 88.9% of parents observed them. This is due to the increased flexibility of lockdown in Italy. As for the changes reported by parents, children and adolescents showed boredom, irritability, reluctance, anger and anxiety, which lead to arguments with the rest of the family, concentration difficulties and frustration. This study is the first one developed to examine the psychological impact of the COVID-19 quarantine on children and adolescents. These two countries are two of the most affected by COVID-19 and this study aimed at examining the emotional well-being of Italian and Spanish adolescents between 3 and 18 in order to provide parents and caregivers with useful advice and guidelines to reduce the impact of the quarantine on the youth.

Measures taken to lessen the impact of quarantine on children and adolescents

Some authors have reflected on the possible effects of the COVID-19 quarantine on children and adolescents. Wang and colleagues highlight the need for awareness of the quarantine's potential effects on children's mental health, and the importance for governments, non-governmental organizations, the community, schools, and parents to act to reduce the possible effects of this situation. Special attention should be paid to children and adolescents who are separated from their caregivers who are infected or suspected of being infected, and those whose caregivers are infected or have died, because they are more vulnerable to psychological problems.

To mitigate this far-reaching and significant negative impact on the psychological wellbeing of children, multifaceted age and developmentally appropriate strategies are required to be adopted by health care authorities.

A study carried out by Dialnet in The Basque country analysed the assessment of professionals working with children on the impact of quarantine on the health and health inequalities of the child population, as well as the importance given to the intermediate factors that can modulate the impact of the experience of lockdown on children's health. Health and socio-educational professionals who work with children were surveyed in order to identify and measure the impact on children's health. Furthermore, this multidisciplinar contribution allowed them to determine whether this professional's perspective entailed a different opinion in the face of the health consequences.

A review published in 2025 claims that while it is clear many children & adolescents experienced developmental health impacts "it may take decades of research to fully understand as pandemic-era children mature into contributing members of society". Further research is required to determine how well children "bounced back".

== Children's experience and understanding ==
Commentators noted that many very young children developed an understanding of reality based largely on the limited world of pandemic life. Taken out of formal childcare and separated from other children they often forgot their old friends. Whilst, previously everyday activities such as visiting a shop or relative's home became exotic. However, even if they couldn't clearly recollect it most young children which were born in the pre COVID-19 world retained some awareness of it.

A study of seven to twelve year olds in the UK, Spain, Canada, Sweden, Brazil and Australia understanding of the pandemic found that more than half of children knew a significant amount about COVID-19. They associated the topic with various negative emotions saying it made them feel "worried", "scared", "angry" and "confused". They tended to be aware of the types of people which were most vulnerable to the virus and the restrictions which were enforced in their communities. Many had learned new terms and phrases in relation to the pandemic such as social distancing. They were most commonly informed about COVID-19 by teachers and parents but also learned about the subject from friends, television and the internet.

== Impact on most at-risk groups ==
Child safety is at risk during the pandemic. Children who are living in unsanitary and crowded conditions are particularly at risk. Youth – especially young women, indigenous peoples, migrants, and refugees – face heightened socioeconomic and health impacts and an increased risk of gender-based violence due to social isolation, discrimination and increased financial stress. They are also more prone to child marriage as families seek ways to alleviate economic burdens. According to UNICEF, over the next decade, up to 10 million more girls could be at risk of becoming child brides as a result of the pandemic.

Although reports of child abuse in the US declined by an average of 40.6% from April 2019 to April 2020, child welfare advocates suggest that this drop is an under-reporting artifact secondary to the closure of schools and daycare centers, where most reports of child abuse are made. The Rape, Abuse & Incest National Network reported in April 2020 that for the first time, over half of the victims calling their National Sexual Assault Hotline for help were minors.

=== Impact on young migrants ===
This global crisis is exacerbating existing vulnerabilities and inequalities experienced by young people, amplified in humanitarian contexts where fragility, conflict, and emergencies have undermined institutional capacity and where there is limited access to services. Particularly affected are: young migrants; young people who are internally displaced or refugees; young people living in poor, high-density urban areas; young people without a home; young people living with disabilities; and those living with HIV. Young people separated from, unaccompanied, or left behind by migrant working parents face higher risks of exploitation, violence, and mental health issues, as well as poor access to health services and protection.

== Vaccines ==
As of 22 September 2020, no vaccine trials were being conducted on children under the age of 18 years. According to the CDC, adolescents ages 16 or 17 are eligible for the Pfizer COVID-19 vaccine, but not the Moderna or Janssen (Johnson & Johnson) vaccines. As of March 2021, Moderna and Pfizer/Biotech had begun conducting vaccine trials for children, and Johnson & Johnson planned to do so as well.

On 22 December 2021, the UK Medicines and Healthcare products Regulatory Agency (MHRA) has approved a new paediatric formulation of the Pfizer BioNTech COVID-19 vaccine for children aged 5 to 11 in United Kingdom.

On 19 June 2022, the U.S. Food and Drug Administration (FDA) has authorized for emergency use both the Pfizer-BioNTech COVID-19 vaccine and the Moderna vaccine for children 6 months to 5 years old.

== Sources ==
- This article incorporates text from a free content work. Licensed under CC BY-SA IGO 3.0 (license statement/permission). Text taken from Explainer: How COVID-19 Impacts Women and Girls, Young Women and Girls, UN Women.
