= The Vision Council =

American optical industry nonprofit trade association

The Vision Council (also known as the Vision Council of America or VCA) is a nonprofit trade association for manufacturers and suppliers of the optical industry in the United States. Its services include research, training and industry networking events. It is located in Alexandria, Virginia.
