= November 16 =

November 16 this year in various calendars
- Monday, 16 November 2026
| Akan | Kurudwo |
| Armenian | 29 Trē 1476 |
| Aztec | Tlacaxipehualiztli 5, 12 Tecpatl |
| Babylonian | 5 Arakhsamna, 2337 SE |
| Balinese pawukon | Luang, Pepet, Pasah, Menala, Paing, Paniron, Coma of Ukir, Uma, Nohan, Duka |
| Bengali | 1 Ogrohayon, BS 1433 |
| Chinese | Yang Wood Horse・Heart Mansion; Fire Horse Year, Month 10, Day 8 (Lidong, 6 days until Xiaoxue) |
| Common Era | 16 November 2026 CE |
| Coptic | 7 Hathor, AM 1743 |
| Egyptian | 4 Pharmuthi, 2775 NE |
| Ethiopian | 7 H̱edār, 2019 Amätä Məhrät |
| French Republican | Décade III, Quintidi de Brumaire de l'Année 235 de la République |
| Gregorian | 16 November, AD 2026 |
| Hebrew | 6 Kislev, AM 5787 |
| Hindu | Śravaṇa・Gaṇḍa; Solar: 30 Kārtika, 1948 SE; Lunisolar: Saptamī, Śukla pakṣa of Kārtika, 2083 VE; Rāudra・5127 KY・1,872,895 |
| Icelandic | Mánudagur, 24 Gormánuður 2026 |
| Islamic | 5 Jumada al-thani, AH 1448 (using tabular method) |
| ISO week date | 2026-W47-1 |
| Japanese | 8 Kannazuki, Reiwa 8 (Rittō, 6 days until Shōsetsu) |
| Julian | 3 November, AD 2026 (AM 7535) |
| Julian day | 2461361 |
| Korean | 8 Dwaejidal, 4359 DE |
| Maya | 13.0.14.1.18; 11 Ceh, 12 Etznab |
| Roman | ante diem III Nonas Novembres, MMDCCLXXIX AUC |
| Solar Hijri | 25 Aban, SH 1405 |
| Tibetan | 7 smin drug, me pho rta 2153 or 1772 or 1000 |

| << | November | | | | | >> |
| Su | Mo | Tu | We | Th | Fr | Sa |
| 1 | 2 | 3 | 4 | 5 | 6 | 7 |
| 8 | 9 | 10 | 11 | 12 | 13 | 14 |
| 15 | 16 | 17 | 18 | 19 | 20 | 21 |
| 22 | 23 | 24 | 25 | 26 | 27 | 28 |
| 29 | 30 |
2026

November 16 in recent years
2026 (Monday)
2025 (Sunday)
2024 (Saturday)
2023 (Thursday)
2022 (Wednesday)
2021 (Tuesday)
2020 (Monday)
2019 (Saturday)
2018 (Friday)
2017 (Thursday)

November 16 is the 320th day of the year (321st in leap years) in the Gregorian calendar; 45 days remain until the end of the year.

== Events ==
=== Pre-1600 ===
- 534 – The second edition of the Code of Justinian is issued by the Byzantine jurist Tribonian and his assistants, consisting of twelve updated and revised books.
- 565 – Justin II is crowned in the Hagia Sophia two days following the death of emperor Justinian I, who is buried in the Church of the Holy Apostles.
- 951 – Emperor Li Jing sends a Southern Tang expeditionary force of 10,000 men under Bian Hao to conquer Chu. Li Jing removes the ruling family to his own capital in Nanjing, ending the Chu Kingdom.
- 1272 – While travelling during the Ninth Crusade, Prince Edward becomes King of England upon Henry III of England's death, but he will not return to England for nearly two years to assume the throne.
- 1326 – King Edward II of England is captured by forces of his wife Isabella of France
- 1491 – An auto-da-fé, held in the Brasero de la Dehesa outside of Ávila, concludes the case of the Holy Child of La Guardia with the public execution of several Jewish and converso suspects.
- 1532 – Francisco Pizarro and his men capture Inca Emperor Atahualpa at the Battle of Cajamarca.

=== 1601–1900 ===
- 1632 – King Gustavus Adolphus of Sweden was killed at the Battle of Lützen during the Thirty Years' War.
- 1776 – American Revolutionary War: British and Hessian units capture Fort Washington from the Patriots.
- 1793 – French Revolution: Ninety dissident Roman Catholic priests are executed by drowning at Nantes.
- 1797 – The Prussian heir apparent, Frederick William, becomes King of Prussia as Frederick William III.
- 1805 – Napoleonic Wars: Battle of Schöngrabern: Russian forces under Pyotr Bagration delay the pursuit by French troops under Joachim Murat.
- 1822 – American Old West: Missouri trader William Becknell arrives in Santa Fe, New Mexico, over a route that became known as the Santa Fe Trail.
- 1828 – Greek War of Independence: The London Protocol entails the creation of an autonomous Greek state under Ottoman suzerainty, encompassing the Morea and the Cyclades.
- 1849 – A Russian court sentences writer Fyodor Dostoyevsky to death for anti-government activities linked to a radical intellectual group; his sentence is later commuted to hard labor.
- 1855 – David Livingstone becomes the first European to see the Victoria Falls in what is now Zambia-Zimbabwe.
- 1857 – Second relief of Lucknow: Twenty-four Victoria Crosses are awarded, the most in a single day.
- 1860 – Fisgard Lighthouse, built in the Colony of Vancouver Island, shines its first light, becoming the first permanent lighthouse in present-day British Columbia
- 1863 – American Civil War: Confederate troops under General James Longstreet unsuccessfully attack Union forces in the Battle of Campbell's Station, allowing General Ambrose Burnside to secure and fortify Knoxville, Tennessee.
- 1871 – The National Rifle Association of America receives its charter from New York State.
- 1885 – Canadian rebel leader of the Métis and "Father of Manitoba" Louis Riel is executed for treason.

=== 1901–present ===
- 1904 – English engineer John Ambrose Fleming receives a patent for the thermionic valve (vacuum tube).
- 1907 – Indian Territory and Oklahoma Territory join to form Oklahoma, which is admitted as the 46th U.S. state.
- 1914 – The Federal Reserve Bank of the United States officially opens.
- 1920 – Qantas, Australia's national airline, is founded as Queensland and Northern Territory Aerial Services Limited.
- 1933 – The United States and the Soviet Union establish formal diplomatic relations.
- 1938 – LSD is first synthesized by Albert Hofmann from ergotamine at the Sandoz Laboratories in Basel.
- 1940 – World War II: In response to the leveling of Coventry by the German Luftwaffe two days before, the Royal Air Force bombs Hamburg.
- 1940 – The Holocaust: In occupied Poland, the Nazis close off the Warsaw Ghetto from the outside world.
- 1940 – New York City's "Mad Bomber" George Metesky places his first bomb at a Manhattan office building used by Consolidated Edison.
- 1944 – World War II: In support of the Battle of Hürtgen Forest, the town of Düren is destroyed by Allied aircraft.
- 1944 – The Jussi Awards, the Finnish film award ceremony, is held for the first time at Restaurant Adlon in Helsinki.
- 1945 – UNESCO is founded.
- 1959 – National Airlines Flight 967 explodes in mid-air over the Gulf of Mexico, killing all 42 aboard.
- 1959 – Aeroflot Flight 315 crashes on approach to Lviv Airport, killing all 40 people on board.
- 1965 – Venera program: The Soviet Union launches the Venera 3 space probe toward Venus, which will be the first spacecraft to reach the surface of another planet.
- 1966 – The Temptations release their Greatest Hits album, which goes on to be the Billboard Year-End R&B album of 1967.
- 1967 – Aeroflot Flight 2230 crashes near Koltsovo Airport, killing 107.
- 1973 – Skylab program: NASA launches Skylab 4 with a crew of three astronauts from Cape Canaveral, Florida for an 84-day mission.
- 1973 – U.S. president Richard Nixon signs the Trans-Alaska Pipeline Authorization Act into law, authorizing the construction of the Alaska Pipeline.
- 1974 – The Arecibo message is broadcast from Puerto Rico.
- 1979 – The first line of Bucharest Metro (Line M1) is opened from Timpuri Noi to Semănătoarea in Bucharest, Romania.
- 1981 – Aeroflot Flight 3603 crashes during landing at Norilsk Airport, killing 99.
- 1988 – The Supreme Soviet of the Estonian Soviet Socialist Republic declares that Estonia is "sovereign" but stops short of declaring independence.
- 1988 – In the first open election in more than a decade, voters in Pakistan elect populist candidate Benazir Bhutto to be Prime Minister of Pakistan.
- 1989 – El Salvadoran army troops kill six Jesuit priests and two others at Jose Simeon Canas University.
- 1990 – Pop group Milli Vanilli are stripped of their Grammy Award because the duo did not sing at all on the Girl You Know It's True album. Session musicians had provided all the vocals.
- 1992 – The Hoxne Hoard is discovered by metal detectorist Eric Lawes in Hoxne, Suffolk.
- 1997 – After nearly 18 years of incarceration, China releases Wei Jingsheng, a pro-democracy dissident, from jail for medical reasons.
- 2002 – The first cases of the 2002–2004 SARS outbreak are traced to Foshan, Guangdong Province, China.
- 2004 – Half-Life 2 is released, a game winning 39 Game of the Year awards and being cited as one of the best games ever made.
- 2005 – Following a 31-year wait, Australia defeats Uruguay in a penalty shootout to qualify for the 2006 FIFA World Cup.
- 2009 – Space Shuttle program: Space Shuttle Atlantis is launched on mission STS-129 to the International Space Station.
- 2022 – Artemis Program: NASA launches Artemis 1 on the first flight of the Space Launch System, the start of the program's future missions to the moon.

== Births ==
=== Pre-1600 ===
- 42 BC – Tiberius, Roman emperor (died 37 AD)
- 1436 – Leonardo Loredan, Italian ruler (died 1521)
- 1457 – Beatrice of Naples, Hungarian queen (died 1508)
- 1466 – Francesco Cattani da Diacceto, Florentine philosopher (died 1522)
- 1483 – Elisabeth of the Palatinate, Landgravine of Hesse, German noble (died 1522)
- 1528 – Jeanne d'Albret, Queen of Navarre (died 1572)
- 1531 – Anna d'Este, Duchess consort of Nemours (died 1607)
- 1538 – Saint Turibius of Mongrovejo, Spanish Grand Inquisitioner, Archbishop of Lima (died 1606)
- 1540 – Princess Cecilia of Sweden (died 1627)
- 1566 – Anna Juliana Gonzaga, Archduchess of Austria and nun (died 1621)
- 1569 – Paul Sartorius, German organist and composer (died 1609)

=== 1601–1900 ===
- 1603 – Augustyn Kordecki, Polish monk (died 1673)
- 1643 – Jean Chardin, French-English jeweler and explorer (died 1703)
- 1648 – Charles Duncombe, English banker and politician (died 1711)
- 1715 – Girolamo Abos, Maltese-Italian composer and educator (died 1760)
- 1717 – Jean le Rond d'Alembert, French mathematician, physicist, and philosopher (died 1793)
- 1720 – Carlo Antonio Campioni, French-Italian composer (died 1788)
- 1750 – Edward Law, 1st Baron Ellenborough, English lawyer, judge, and politician (died 1818)
- 1753 – James McHenry, Irish-American surgeon and politician (died 1816)
- 1758 – Peter Andreas Heiberg, Danish philologist and author (died 1841)
- 1774 – Georg von Cancrin, German-Russian Minister of Finance (died 1845)
- 1793 – Francis Danby, Irish painter of the Romantic era (died 1861)
- 1806 – Mary Tyler Peabody Mann, American author and educator (died 1887)
- 1807 – Jónas Hallgrímsson, Icelandic poet, author and naturalist (died 1845)
- 1811 – John Bright, English academic and politician (died 1889)
- 1836 – Kalākaua of Hawaii (died 1891)
- 1839 – Louis-Honoré Fréchette, Canadian poet, author, and politician (died 1908)
- 1841 – Jules Violle, French physicist and academic (died 1923)
- 1847 – Edmund James Flynn, Canadian lawyer and politician (died 1927)
- 1851 – Minnie Hauk, American-Swiss soprano and actress (died 1929)
- 1856 – Jürgen Kröger, German architect (died 1928)
- 1861 – Luigi Facta, Italian politician and journalist (died 1930)
- 1861 – Georgina Febres-Cordero, Venezuelan nun (died 1925)
- 1862 – Charles Turner, Australian cricketer (died 1944)
- 1873 – W. C. Handy, American trumpet player and composer (died 1958)
- 1874 – Alexander Kolchak, Russian admiral and explorer (died 1920)
- 1883 – Emil Breitkreutz, American runner and coach (died 1972)
- 1888 – Luis Cluzeau Mortet, Uruguayan pianist and composer (died 1957)
- 1889 – George S. Kaufman, American director, producer, and playwright (died 1961)
- 1889 – Dietrich Kraiß, German general (died 1944)
- 1890 – Elpidio Quirino, 6th President of the Philippines (died 1956)
- 1892 – Guo Moruo, Chinese historian, author, and poet (died 1978)
- 1892 – Tazio Nuvolari, Italian race car driver and motorcycle racer (died 1953)
- 1894 – Bobby Cruickshank, American golfer (died 1975)
- 1894 – Richard von Coudenhove-Kalergi, Austrian philosopher and politician (died 1972)
- 1895 – Paul Hindemith, German composer, violist and conductor (died 1963)
- 1896 – Joan Lindsay, Australian author and critic (died 1984)
- 1896 – Oswald Mosley, English fascist leader and politician (died 1980)
- 1896 – Lawrence Tibbett, American actor and singer (died 1960)
- 1897 – Choudhry Rahmat Ali, Indian-Pakistani academic (died 1951)
- 1899 – Mary Margaret McBride, American radio host (died 1976)
- 1900 – Eliška Junková, Czech race car driver (died 1994)

=== 1901–present ===
- 1904 – Nnamdi Azikiwe, Nigerian statesman, 1st President of Nigeria (died 1996)
- 1907 – Burgess Meredith, American actor, singer, director, producer, and screenwriter (died 1997)
- 1909 – Mirza Nasir Ahmad, Indian-Pakistani religious leader (died 1982)
- 1912 – George O. Petrie, American actor and director (died 1997)
- 1912 – W. E. D. Ross, Canadian actor, playwright, and author (died 1995)
- 1913 – Ellen Albertini Dow, American actress (died 2015)
- 1914 – Eddie Chapman, English spy (died 1997)
- 1915 – Jean Fritz, Chinese-American author (died 2017)
- 1916 – Harold Baigent, New Zealand actor and director (died 1996)
- 1916 – Daws Butler, American voice actor and singer (died 1988)
- 1916 – Al Lucas, Canadian-American bassist (died 1983)
- 1922 – Gene Amdahl, American computer scientist, physicist, and engineer (died 2015)
- 1922 – José Saramago, Portuguese novelist and Nobel laureate in Literature (died 2010)
- 1924 – Sam Farber, American businessman (died 2013)
- 1924 – Mel Patton, American sprinter and coach (died 2014)
- 1927 – Dolo Coker, American pianist and composer (died 1983)
- 1929 – Peter Boizot, English businessman (died 2018)
- 1930 – Paul Foytack, American baseball player (died 2021)
- 1930 – Salvatore Riina, Italian mob boss (died 2017)
- 1931 – Luciano Bottaro, Italian author and illustrator (died 2006)
- 1931 – Hubert Sumlin, American singer and guitarist (died 2011)
- 1932 – Beatriz González, Colombian painter, sculptor and art historian (died 2026)
- 1933 – Garnet Mimms, American R&B singer
- 1933 – Seydou Madani Sy, Senegalese jurist and politician (died 2026)
- 1935 – Elizabeth Drew, American journalist and author
- 1935 – Mohammad Hussein Fadlallah, Iraqi-Lebanese cleric, educator, and author (died 2010)
- 1935 – Magdi Yacoub, Egyptian-English surgeon and academic
- 1936 – John Moore, Australian businessman and politician (died 2025)
- 1937 – Alan Budd, English economist and academic (died 2023)
- 1938 – Ahmed Bouanani, Moroccan filmmaker (died 2011)
- 1938 – Kang Ning-hsiang, Taiwanese politician
- 1938 – Walter Learning, Canadian actor (died 2020)
- 1938 – Robert Nozick, American philosopher, author, and academic (died 2002)
- 1938 – Troy Seals, American singer-songwriter and guitarist (died 2025)
- 1939 – Michael Billington, English author and critic
- 1941 – Angelo Gilardino, Italian guitarist, composer, and musicologist (died 2022)
- 1941 – Gerry Marshall, English race car driver (died 2005)
- 1941 – Dan Penn, American singer-songwriter and producer
- 1942 – Willie Carson, Scottish jockey and sportscaster
- 1942 – Joanna Pettet, English actress (died 2026)
- 1944 – Oliver Braddick, English psychologist and academic (died 2022)
- 1945 – Teenie Hodges, American guitarist and songwriter (died 2014)
- 1945 – Lynn Hunt, American historian, author, and academic
- 1946 – Colin Burgess, Australian drummer and songwriter (died 2023)
- 1946 – Terence McKenna, American botanist, philosopher, and author (died 2000)
- 1946 – Barbara Smith, American writer
- 1946 – Beverly Smith, American writer
- 1946 – Jo Jo White, American basketball player and coach (died 2018)
- 1947 – Omar Ruiz Hernández, Cuban journalist and activist
- 1948 – Horst Bertram, German footballer and manager (died 2023)
- 1948 – Teodoro Locsin, Jr., Filipino journalist, lawyer, politician and diplomat
- 1948 – Chi Coltrane, American singer-songwriter and pianist
- 1948 – Bonnie Greer, American-English playwright and critic (died 2026)
- 1948 – Ken James, Australian actor
- 1950 – Harvey Martin, American football player (died 2001)
- 1950 – Manuel Zamora, Filipino farmer and politician
- 1951 – Andy Dalton, New Zealand rugby player
- 1953 – Griff Rhys Jones, Welsh comedian, actor, and author
- 1954 – Andrea Barrett, American novelist and short story writer
- 1954 – Dick Gross, Australian lawyer and politician
- 1955 – Héctor Cúper, Argentine footballer, coach, and manager
- 1955 – Pierre Larouche, Canadian ice hockey player and coach
- 1955 – Guillermo Lasso, Ecuadoran businessman, 47th President of Ecuador
- 1955 – Jun Kunimura, Japanese actor
- 1955 – Esteban Trapiello, Venezuelan businessman
- 1956 – Terry Labonte, American race car driver and businessman
- 1957 – Jacques Gamblin, French actor
- 1958 – Boris Krivokapić, Serbian author and academic
- 1959 – Glenda Bailey, English journalist
- 1959 – Francis M. Fesmire, American cardiologist and physician (died 2014)
- 1961 – Frank Bruno, English boxer
- 1962 – Darwyn Cooke, Canadian writer and artist (died 2016)
- 1962 – Sergei Agashkov, Turkmen football player and manager (died 2026)
- 1963 – Steve Argüelles, English drummer and producer
- 1963 – William Bonner, Brazilian newscaster, publicist and journalist
- 1963 – Zina Garrison, American tennis player
- 1964 – Waheed Alli, Baron Alli, English businessman and politician
- 1964 – Valeria Bruni Tedeschi, Italian-French actress, director, and screenwriter
- 1964 – Dwight Gooden, American baseball player
- 1964 – Maeve Quinlan, American actress
- 1965 – Mika Aaltonen, Finnish footballer
- 1966 – Joey Cape, American singer-songwriter, guitarist, and producer
- 1966 – Christian Lorenz, German keyboard player
- 1966 – Dean McDermott, Canadian-American actor and producer
- 1966 – Tahir Shah, English journalist, author, and explorer
- 1967 – Craig Arnold, American poet and academic (died 2009)
- 1968 – Shobha Nagi Reddy, Indian politician (died 2014)
- 1968 – Melvin Stewart, American swimmer
- 1970 – Logan Mader, Canadian-American guitarist and producer
- 1971 – Tanja Damaske, German javelin thrower and shot putter
- 1971 – Mustapha Hadji, Moroccan footballer and manager
- 1971 – Annely Peebo, Estonian soprano and actress
- 1971 – Alexander Popov, Russian swimmer and coach
- 1971 – Waqar Younis, Pakistani cricketer and coach
- 1973 – Christian Horner, English race car driver and manager
- 1973 – Brendan Laney, New Zealand-Scottish rugby player and sportscaster
- 1974 – Maurizio Margaglio, Italian ice dancer and coach
- 1974 – Paul Scholes, English footballer and sportscaster
- 1975 – Julio Lugo, Dominican baseball player (died 2021)
- 1975 – Yuki Uchida, Japanese actress, model, and singer
- 1976 – Dan Black, English singer-songwriter
- 1976 – Juha Pasoja, Finnish footballer
- 1976 – Martijn Zuijdweg, Dutch swimmer
- 1977 – Gigi Edgley, Australian singer-songwriter and actress
- 1977 – Mauricio Ochmann, Mexican actor and producer
- 1978 – Kip Bouknight, American baseball player
- 1978 – Mehtap Doğan-Sızmaz, Turkish runner
- 1978 – Takashi Nagayama, Japanese actor
- 1978 – Gary Naysmith, Scottish footballer and manager
- 1978 – Carolina Parra, Brazilian guitarist and drummer
- 1979 – Bruce Irons, American surfer
- 1980 – Moris Carrozzieri, Italian footballer
- 1980 – Kayte Christensen, American basketball player
- 1980 – Nicole Gius, Italian skier
- 1980 – Carol Huynh, Canadian wrestler
- 1980 – Hasan Üçüncü, Turkish footballer
- 1981 – Fernando Cabrera, Puerto Rican baseball player
- 1981 – Allison Crowe, Canadian singer-songwriter
- 1981 – Caitlin Glass, American voice actress, singer, and director
- 1981 – Kate Miller-Heidke, Australian singer-songwriter
- 1981 – Osi Umenyiora, English-American football player
- 1982 – Nonito Donaire, Filipino-American boxer
- 1982 – Jannie du Plessis, South African rugby player
- 1982 – Ronald Pognon, French sprinter
- 1982 – Amar'e Stoudemire, American-Israeli basketball player
- 1983 – Kool A.D., American rapper
- 1983 – Kari Lehtonen, Finnish ice hockey player
- 1983 – Britta Steffen, German swimmer
- 1984 – Gemma Atkinson, English model and actress
- 1984 – Mark Bunn, English footballer
- 1984 – Tamawashi Ichiro, Mongolian sumo wrestler
- 1985 – Aditya Roy Kapur, Indian actor
- 1985 – Sanna Marin, Finnish politician, former Prime Minister of Finland
- 1986 – Omar Mateen, Islamic terrorist, perpetrator of the Orlando nightclub shooting (died 2016)
- 1986 – Maxime Médard, French rugby player
- 1987 – Eitan Tibi, Israeli footballer
- 1987 – Jordan Walden, American baseball player
- 1989 – Iamsu!, American rapper and producer
- 1990 – Arjo Atayde, Filipino actor
- 1990 – Dénes Dibusz, Hungarian football player
- 1991 – Nemanja Gudelj, Serbian footballer
- 1991 – Tomomi Kasai, Japanese actress and singer
- 1992 – George Akpabio, Nigerian footballer
- 1992 – Matthew Allwood, Australian rugby league player
- 1992 – Marcelo Brozović, Croatian footballer
- 1992 – Shane Prince, American-Belarusian ice hockey player
- 1993 – C. J. Beathard, American football player
- 1993 – Nélson Semedo, Portuguese footballer
- 1993 – Denzel Valentine, American basketball player
- 1994 – Yoshiki Yamamoto, Japanese footballer
- 1995 – André-Frank Zambo Anguissa, Cameroonian footballer
- 1996 – Ivan Baran, Croatian writer
- 1996 – Boulaye Dia, Senegalese footballer
- 1996 – Trinovi Khairani, Indonesian politician
- 1997 – Bruno Guimarães, Brazilian footballer
- 1998 – Cindy Kimberly, Spanish and Dutch influencer and model
- 1999 – Bol Bol, South Sudanese-American basketball player
- 1999 – Mats Wieffer, Dutch footballer
- 2000 – Josh Green, Australian basketball player
- 2006 – Mason Ramsey, American singer

== Deaths ==
=== Pre-1600 ===
- 897 – Gu Yanhui, Chinese warlord
- 987 – Shen Lun, Chinese scholar-official
- 1005 – Ælfric of Abingdon, Archbishop of Canterbury
- 1093 – Saint Margaret of Scotland (born 1045)
- 1131 – Dobrodeia of Kiev, Rus princess and author of medical books
- 1240 – Edmund Rich, English archbishop and saint (born 1175)
- 1240 – Ibn Arabi, Andalusian Arab philosopher (born 1165)
- 1264 – Emperor Lizong of Song China (born 1205)
- 1272 – Henry III of England (born 1207)
- 1322 – Nasr, Sultan of Granada (born 1287)
- 1328 – Prince Hisaaki, Japanese shōgun (born 1276)
- 1464 – John, Margrave of Brandenburg-Kulmbach (born 1406)
- 1494 – Theda Ukena, German noble (born 1432)
- 1580 – Marie of Baden-Sponheim, German Noblewoman (born 1507)

=== 1601–1900 ===
- 1601 – Charles Neville, 6th Earl of Westmorland (born 1542)
- 1603 – Pierre Charron, French Catholic theologian and philosopher (born 1541)
- 1613 – Trajano Boccalini, Italian author and educator (born 1556)
- 1625 – Sofonisba Anguissola, Italian painter (born c. 1532)
- 1628 – Paolo Quagliati, Italian organist and composer (born 1555)
- 1688 – Bengt Gottfried Forselius, Swedish-Estonian scholar and author (born 1660)
- 1695 – Pierre Nicole, French philosopher and author (born 1625)
- 1724 – Jack Sheppard, English criminal (born 1702)
- 1745 – James Butler, 2nd Duke of Ormonde, Irish general and politician, Lord Lieutenant of Ireland (born 1665)
- 1773 – John Hawkesworth, English journalist and author (born 1715)
- 1779 – Pehr Kalm, Finnish botanist and explorer (born 1716)
- 1790 – Daniel of St. Thomas Jenifer, American politician (born 1723)
- 1797 – Frederick William II of Prussia (born 1744)
- 1802 – André Michaux, French botanist and explorer (born 1746)
- 1806 – Moses Cleaveland, American general, lawyer, and politician, founded Cleveland, Ohio (born 1754)
- 1808 – Mustafa IV, Ottoman sultan (born 1779)
- 1836 – Christiaan Hendrik Persoon, South African-French mycologist and academic (born 1761)
- 1878 – Princess Marie of Hesse and by Rhine (born 1874)
- 1884 – František Chvostek, Czech-Austrian soldier and physician (born 1835)
- 1885 – Louis Riel, Canadian lawyer and politician (born 1844)

=== 1901–present ===
- 1903 – Princess Elisabeth of Hesse and by Rhine (born 1895)
- 1907 – Robert I, Duke of Parma (born 1848)
- 1908 – Henri-Gustave Joly de Lotbinière, French-Canadian lawyer and politician, 4th Premier of Quebec (born 1829)
- 1911 – A. A. Ames, American physician and politician, 9th Mayor of Minneapolis (born 1842)
- 1911 – Lawrence Feuerbach, American shot putter (born 1879)
- 1913 – George Barham, English businessman, founded Express County Milk Supply Company (born 1836)
- 1922 – Max Abraham, Polish-German physicist and academic (born 1875)
- 1939 – Pierce Butler, American lawyer and jurist (born 1866)
- 1941 – Eduard Eelma, Estonian footballer (born 1902)
- 1941 – Miina Härma, Estonian organist, composer, and conductor (born 1864)
- 1947 – Giuseppe Volpi, Italian businessman and politician, founded the Venice Film Festival (born 1877)
- 1950 – Bob Smith, American physician and surgeon, co-founded Alcoholics Anonymous (born 1879)
- 1956 – Ōtori Tanigorō, Japanese sumo wrestler, the 24th Yokozuna (born 1887)
- 1960 – Clark Gable, American actor (born 1901)
- 1961 – Sam Rayburn, American lawyer and politician, 48th Speaker of the United States House of Representatives (born 1882)
- 1964 – Donald C. Peattie, American botanist and author (born 1898)
- 1971 – Edie Sedgwick, American model and actress (born 1943)
- 1972 – Vera Karalli, Russian ballerina and actress (born 1889)
- 1973 – Alan Watts, English-American philosopher, author, and educator (born 1915)
- 1974 – Walther Meissner, German physicist and engineer (born 1882)
- 1976 – Jack Foster, English cricketer (born 1905)
- 1982 – Pavel Alexandrov, Russian mathematician and academic (born 1896)
- 1984 – Vic Dickenson, American trombonist (born 1906)
- 1986 – Siobhán McKenna, Irish actress (born 1923)
- 1986 – Panditrao Agashe, Indian businessman (born 1936)
- 1987 – Jim Brewer, American baseball player and coach (born 1937)
- 1989 – Jean-Claude Malépart, Canadian lawyer and politician (born 1938)
- 1990 – Ege Bagatur, Turkish politician (born 1937)
- 1993 – Lucia Popp, Slovak-German soprano (born 1939)
- 1993 – Achille Zavatta, Tunisia-born French clown (born 1915)
- 1994 – Chet Powers, American singer-songwriter and guitarist (born 1943)
- 1999 – Daniel Nathans, American microbiologist and academic, Nobel Prize laureate (born 1928)
- 2000 – Robert Earl Davis, American hip-hop artist (born 1971)
- 2000 – Ahmet Kaya, Turkish-French singer-songwriter (born 1957)
- 2001 – Tommy Flanagan, American pianist and composer (born 1930)
- 2005 – Ralph Edwards, American radio and television host and producer (born 1913)
- 2005 – Henry Taube, Canadian-American chemist and academic, Nobel Prize laureate (born 1915)
- 2005 – Donald Watson, English activist, founded the Vegan Society (born 1910)
- 2006 – Milton Friedman, American economist and academic, Nobel Prize laureate (born 1912)
- 2006 – Yuri Levada, Russian sociologist and political scientist (born 1930)
- 2007 – Harold Alfond, American businessman (born 1914)
- 2007 – Grethe Kausland, Norwegian actress and singer (born 1947)
- 2007 – Trond Kirkvaag, Norwegian actor and screenwriter (born 1946)
- 2007 – Vernon Scannell, English boxer, poet, and author (born 1922)
- 2008 – Jan Krugier; Polish-Swiss art dealer (born 1928)
- 2008 – Reg Varney, English actor and screenwriter (born 1916)
- 2009 – Antonio de Nigris, Mexican footballer (born 1978)
- 2009 – Sergei Magnitsky, Ukrainian-Russian accountant and lawyer (born 1972)
- 2009 – Edward Woodward, English actor (born 1930)
- 2010 – Britton Chance, American biologist and sailor (born 1913)
- 2010 – Ronni Chasen, American publicist (born 1946)
- 2010 – Wyngard Tracy, Filipino DJ and talent manager (born 1952)
- 2012 – John Chapman, Australian evangelist and academic (born 1930)
- 2012 – Subhash Dutta, Bangladeshi actor and director (born 1930)
- 2012 – Patrick Edlinger, French mountaineer (born 1960)
- 2012 – Aliu Mahama, Ghanaian engineer and politician, 3rd Vice President of Ghana (born 1946)
- 2012 – Eliyahu Nawi, Iraqi-Israeli lawyer, judge, and politician (born 1920)
- 2012 – Bob Scott, New Zealand rugby player (born 1921)
- 2013 – Robert Conley, American journalist (born 1928)
- 2013 – Billy Hardwick, American bowler (born 1941)
- 2013 – William McDonough Kelly, Canadian lieutenant and politician (born 1925)
- 2013 – Tanvir Ahmad Khan, Indian-Pakistani diplomat, 19th Foreign Secretary of Pakistan (born 1932)
- 2013 – Oscar Lanford, American mathematician and academic (born 1940)
- 2013 – Arne Pedersen, Norwegian footballer and manager (born 1931)
- 2013 – Louis D. Rubin, Jr., American author, critic, and academic (born 1923)
- 2013 – Charles Waterhouse, American painter, sculptor, and illustrator (born 1924)
- 2014 – Charles Champlin, American historian, author, and critic (born 1926)
- 2014 – Jovan Ćirilov, Serbian poet and playwright (born 1931)
- 2014 – Ian Craig, Australian cricketer (born 1935)
- 2014 – Juan Joseph, American football player and coach (born 1987)
- 2014 – Jadwiga Piłsudska, Polish soldier, pilot, and architect (born 1920)
- 2014 – Carl Sanders, American soldier, pilot, and politician, 74th Governor of Georgia (born 1925)
- 2015 – David Canary, American actor (born 1938)
- 2015 – Michael C. Gross, American graphic designer and producer (born 1945)
- 2015 – Bert Olmstead, Canadian ice hockey player and coach (born 1926)
- 2015 – Alton D. Slay, American general (born 1924)
- 2016 – Jay Wright Forrester, American computer engineer (born 1918)
- 2016 – Melvin Laird, American politician and writer (born 1922)
- 2016 – Daniel Prodan, Romanian football player (born 1972)
- 2017 – Hiromi Tsuru, Japanese actress (born 1960)
- 2017 – Ann Wedgeworth, American actress (born 1934)
- 2018 – William Goldman, American novelist, playwright, and screenwriter (born 1931)
- 2019 – John Campbell Brown, Scottish astronomer (born 1947)
- 2019 – Terry O'Neill, British photographer (born 1938)
- 2020 – Sheila Nelson, English string teacher (born 1936)
- 2021 – Jyrki Kasvi, Finnish journalist and politician (born 1964)
- 2022 – Robert Clary, French-American actor and author (born 1926)
- 2022 – Arthur Ngirakelsong, 2nd Chief Justice of Palau (born 1941)
- 2024 – Vladimir Shklyarov, Russian ballet dancer (born 1985)

== Holidays and observances ==
- Christian feast day:
  - Africus
  - Agnes of Assisi
  - Edmund of Abingdon
  - Elfric of Abingdon
  - Eucherius of Lyon
  - Gertrude the Great (Roman Catholic Church)
  - Gobrain
  - Hugh of Lincoln
  - Margaret of Scotland
  - Matthew the Evangelist (Eastern Christianity)
  - Othmar
  - Our Lady of the Gate of Dawn
  - Roch Gonzalez, Juan de Castillo, and Alonso Rodriguez, SJ
  - November 16 (Eastern Orthodox liturgics)
- Day of Declaration of Sovereignty (Estonia)
- Earliest day on which Day of Repentance and Prayer can fall, while November 22 is the latest; celebrated 11 days before Advent Sunday (Lutheran, Reformed (Calvinist) and United Protestant churches, Saxony, Bavaria), and its related observance:
  - Volkstrauertag (Germany)
- Icelandic Language Day or Dagur íslenskrar tungu (Iceland)
- International Day for Tolerance (United Nations)
- Statia Day in Sint Eustatius (Caribbean Netherlands)
- Intergenerational Fairness Day (International day of action for rights of younger and future generations)
