= Generationism =

Age-related belief

Generationism is the belief that a specific generation has inherent traits that make it inferior or superior to another generation. The term is usually applied to claims of superiority in the expressed values, valuations, lifestyles, and general beliefs of one generation compared to those of another, where objectively verifiable criteria substantiating the claim of superiority in themselves are lacking.

== Description ==
Generationism is most commonly used as an accusation against the belief that the contemporary generation in itself is inherently superior to previous generations, for example through the common practice of pejoratively referring to ancient cultures as "primitive" – not to be confused with the positive label of primitivism – although an older generation's opposition to the values and lifestyles of a younger generation may also popularly be referred to as generationist.

== Critical analysis ==
Generationism as a recurring sociological phenomenon has been studied in detail by the Swedish philosophers Alexander Bard and Jan Söderqvist in their work The Global Empire (published in Swedish in 2003). Bard and Söderqvist regard generationism as a close but far less frequently analyzed relative of racism which they propose should be studied in more detail to strengthen the general argumentation for relativism and pragmatism in contemporary philosophy.

== See also ==
- Ageism
- Intergenerational Equity
- Inter-generational contract
- "OK boomer"
- Transgenerational design
