= Girmacchaw Takla Hawaryat =

Ethiopian poet

Girmachew Tekle Hawaryat
- Born: July 18, 1915; Ethiopia
- Died: June 10, 1987 (aged 71); Ethiopia
- Occupation(s): Novelist, poet
- Known for: African poet, wrote the novel Araya

Girmachew Tekle Hawaryat (1915–1987) was an Ethiopian poet, who wrote one of the most well-known African novels, Araya (1948–49).

== Lifework ==
Girmachew's most famous work Araya was written in 1948, and encompasses the journeying of a peasant called Araya to Europe.

Araya became a novel that was widely recognized throughout Ethiopia and Africa more broadly. It explores the themes of generational conflict and the superpositions of the differences between the modern and traditional cultures that exist between the two continents.
