= Intergenerational Fairness Day =

The Intergenerational Fairness Day (IFD) is observed annually on 16 November as a day dedicated to reflection and public discussion on fairness between present, younger, and future generations. It is coordinated by an international network of non-partisan civil society organisations focused on long-term governance and the rights and interests of future generations.

The day was first observed in 2023 and initially emerged from efforts to promote international recognition of intergenerational fairness, including advocacy for the establishment of an official United Nations international day related to future generations. While the United Nations observes numerous international days related to human rights, sustainability, youth, and social justice (such as World Children's Day – 20 November, Human Rights Day – 10 December, International Women's Day – 8 March, World Water Day – 22 March, etc.).

Since its inception, the focus of Intergenerational Fairness Day has evolved. While it continues to raise awareness of long-term risks and policy challenges that disproportionately affect younger and future generations, it has increasingly been used as a moment for institutional reflection and democratic engagement, particularly at the European level. This shift has been influenced by broader international developments, including the United Nations Summit of the Future (2024) and the adoption of the Declaration on Future Generations, as well as new governance initiatives within the European Union.

In 2025, Intergenerational Fairness Day coincided with the final session of the European Commission’s Citizens’ Panel on Intergenerational Fairness, during which 150 randomly selected citizens from all 27 EU Member States formally presented 24 policy recommendations to the European Commissioner responsible for Intergenerational Fairness. These recommendations were developed over a three-month deliberative process and are intended to inform the European Union’s first Strategy on Intergenerational Fairness, expected to be published in 2026. The coincidence of the citizens’ handover with Intergenerational Fairness Day has been interpreted by organisers and observers as marking a shift toward the day functioning as a recurring moment of democratic accountability for long-term policymaking within the EU.

Intergenerational Fairness Day addresses a broad range of long-term challenges, including climate change, biodiversity loss, demographic change, public debt, technological transformation, housing affordability, pension sustainability, and the governance implications of artificial intelligence. Activities associated with the day typically include public debates, policy discussions, citizen dialogues, academic events, and media coverage focusing on how present-day decisions affect future generations.

Organisations participating in Intergenerational Fairness Day activities have included groups based in Europe, North America, Africa, Asia, and Australia, as well as networks working on youth participation, sustainability, and future-oriented governance. While the day is not an official public holiday, it has increasingly been used by civil society and policy actors as a reference point for discussions on institutional mechanisms to incorporate long-term considerations into democratic decision-making.

== Intergenerational Fairness ==
Intergenerational fairness is a fundamental principle that holds far-reaching implications for societies and the well-being of both current and future generations. This concept underscores the equitable treatment of individuals of all ages, ensuring that the interests and needs of each generation are taken into consideration, addressing a range of significant societal, ethical, and economic concerns. However, it is often noted that democracy tends to be biased towards the present. Scholars, like Dennis F. Thompson, often describe that due to the political system's focus on achieving immediate results within a single term, the long-term consequences of political decisions are often challenging to determine. It is argued that future generations are not well-represented in the political process, while the percentage of elderly voters continues to increase, leading to a potential imbalance in the representation of different age groups. As a result, long-term challenges that will impact future generations may receive limited political or public attention. See also Intergenerational equity.

Intergenerational Fairness Day emphasizes the importance of policies that take into account society's long-term needs, safeguard the rights of future generations, respect planetary limits, and prevent the deferral of costs without corresponding benefits. This necessitates policies that make long-term investments, address persistent issues effectively, and promote democratic values. Intergenerational equity-based policies aim to tackle issues such as public debt, provision of social safety nets, and investment in infrastructure and education. Neglecting these issues can lead to economic crises that can affect younger generations disproportionately. Equitable distribution of opportunities and resources across generations is essential to ensure fairness for all members of society. Sustainable economic systems, prudent resource management, and environmental stewardship are vital for leaving behind a healthy ecosystem with adequate resources and a stable climate for future generations. Intergenerational fairness aims to reduce social, political, economic, and environmental inequalities to achieve this.

== See also ==
- Future generations
- Inter-generational contract
- Intergenerational equity
- Justice (economics)
- Longtermism
- Proxy voting
- Transgenerational design
- Weak and strong sustainability
- Youth rights
