= Missoula Children's Theatre =

Touring theater group that casts their original plays with local children

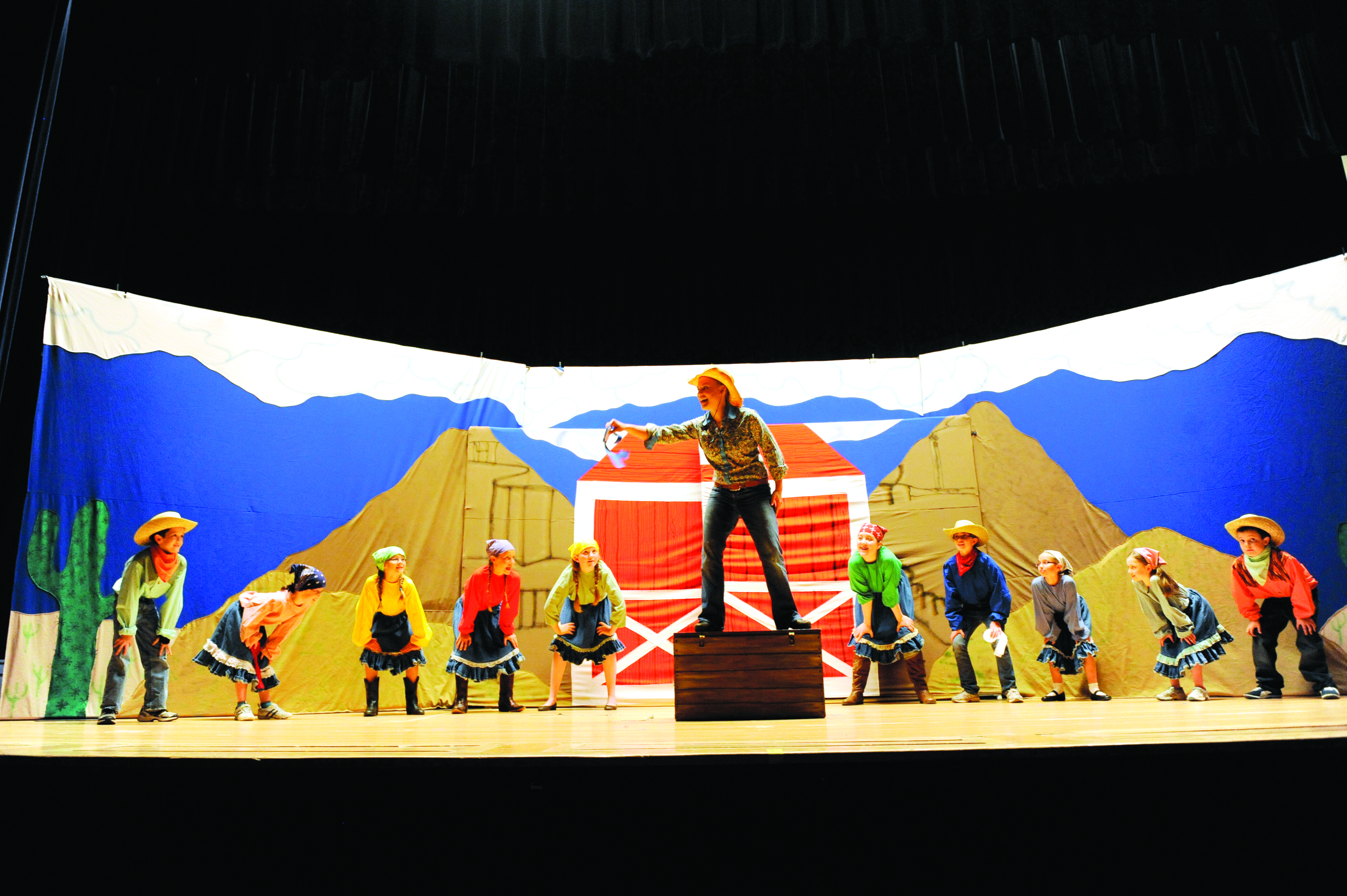
- Missoula Children's Theatre production at Joint Base Elmendorf–Richardson in Alaska
- Formation: 1970
- Type: Theatre group
- Purpose: Theatre for Young Audiences
- Location: Missoula, Montana
- Notable members: Lily Gladstone
- Website: mctinc.org

The Missoula Children's Theatre (MCT) is a touring children's theater program that travels across the United States and internationally, casting local youths in performances of original plays based on classic children's stories. Based in Missoula, Montana, it is part of MCT, Inc., a nonprofit, 501(c)(3) organization that employs about 120 full-time staff members and also includes the Missoula Community Theatre. The Missoula Children's Theatre is believed to be the world's largest touring children's theatre.

The mission statement of MCT is "the development of life skills in children through participation in the performing arts". The organization has traveled to 50 states, 5 Canadian Provinces and 17 countries. One goal of MCT is to "reach the small communities that have few creative outlets or resources for their children", and to "[help] our country's children grow into confident, successful citizens using the positive results of our programs". Traveling to over 1,000 communities annually, MCT works with roughly 65,000 children a year who perform in plays, and their theater workshops reach 150,000 young people in underserved areas.

== History ==
MCT was founded by Jim Caron and Don Collins in 1970. They began by putting on performances for children, then started casting actual children when appropriate for certain plays. The decision to use child actors who lived in the communities where they performed began in 1972, when Caron and Collins scheduled a performance of Snow White and the Seven Dwarfs in Miles City, Montana, in February. Not wanting to travel with their child cast members over 500 miles of icy roads, they decided to cast local children instead. They arrived a week early to prepare and, thinking they would have difficulty finding enough young performers, were stunned to be greeted by over 450 children wanting to audition for the seven spots.

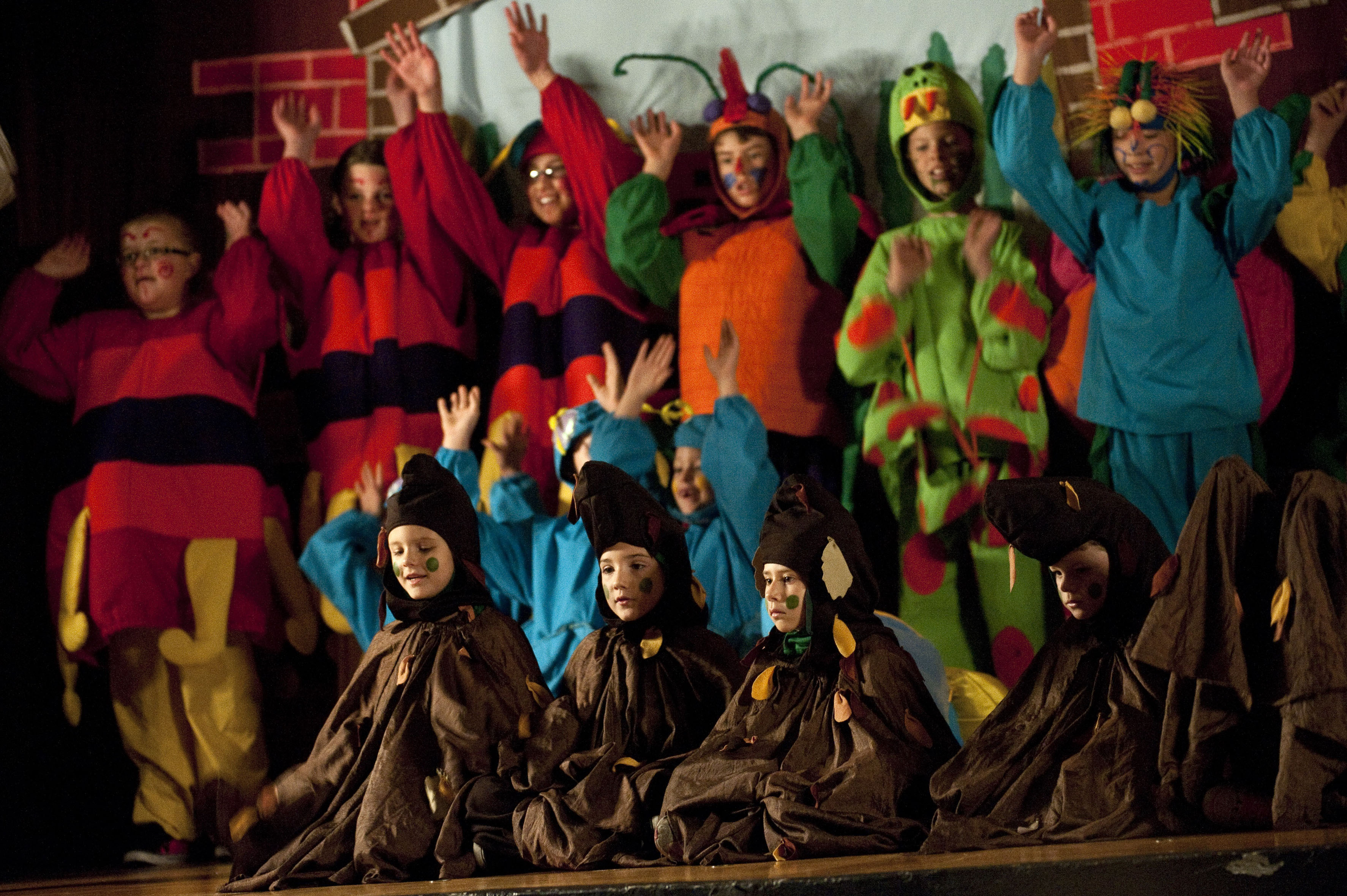
MCT production of The Secret Garden at Nellis Air Force Base in Nevada

Caron continued to serve as CEO of MCT until 2010 when he was succeeded by Michael McGill. For his work with MCT, Caron was awarded the Montana Governor's Arts Award in 1987, and received an Outstanding Alumnus Award from the University of Montana in 1993. Originally, the CEO also needed to serve as the artistic director, but by 2018, they had obtained grant funding from the M.J. Murdock Charitable Trust, which allowed them to hire a separate full-time artistic director, allowing the CEO to focus on leadership and development.

Missoula Children's Theatre has contracted with the United States Department of Defense Dependents Schools and other service programs of the Army, Navy, and Air Force to bring programs to the children of families at domestic and overseas military bases for over 20 years. For example, the staff of MCT was hired by the U.S. Army's Installation Management Command to support Child, Youth and School Service in 2012 and toured multiple U.S. military bases throughout Europe.

In 2015, MCT launched an Intergenerational Tour Program that added stops at retirement communities where school-age children and senior citizens work with one another. Each resident is paired with a child from the community, and they prepare for their roles together.

In 2020, MCT was awarded grant funding from the National Endowment for the Arts, one of seventeen regional and community musical theatre organizations so recognized. As the organization had needed to suspend many of its activities during the COVID-19 pandemic, the funding was particularly timely and helpful as MCT staff restarted their traditional programs.

== Programs ==
Missoula Children's Theatre's touring program is unique in its approach to casting local children. Communities have to ask for MCT to come and do a residency. There are approximately 40–50 traveling teams that each consist of two adult actor-directors. MCT staff usually travel to communities in distinctive red pickup trucks that carry the scripts, costumes, props, and other items required to put on a play. While there is a small or no charge to the local children who participate, communities support the program by providing lodging for the MCT staff, performance and rehearsal space, a piano and accompanist, publicity, and a residency fee (which varies by region). Generally, 50 to 60 children are cast, and they have 20 hours of rehearsal. MCT presentations are original musical adaptations of classic children's stories, usually with a humorous twist. Local children audition for roles, and then rehearse for six days prior to putting on two performances. The MCT team also conducts enrichment workshops that serve additional children.

One special focus of MCT has always been to reach rural areas. In casting young performers, they look beyond children with dramatic talent and seek out children who would benefit from the process. Another area of emphasis is to work with military bases and the children of people serving in the armed forces. MCT also holds musical theatre day camps and performing arts classes in Missoula, as well as a summer Performing Arts Camp that admits students from around the world. Their program "Next Step Prep—The Academy for Musical Theatre" is for high school students and helps them prepare for college or a career in the performing arts.

Groups that have helped sponsor the MCT in local communities have included local colleges and universities, local United Way groups, and arts councils, and local community theater organizations.

A documentary, The Little Red Truck, followed a MCT team and their young actors as they prepared a show. Co-produced by director Rob Whitehair and his wife, Pam Voth, it was released in 2008 to mixed reviews, but was favorably described by The New York Times as "the cutest thing in the history of cuteness." Whitehair stated, "This film restored my faith in humanity. It forced me to look at things in a different light and ask myself, 'At what point do we lose the ability to say anything is possible.' These kids still believe."

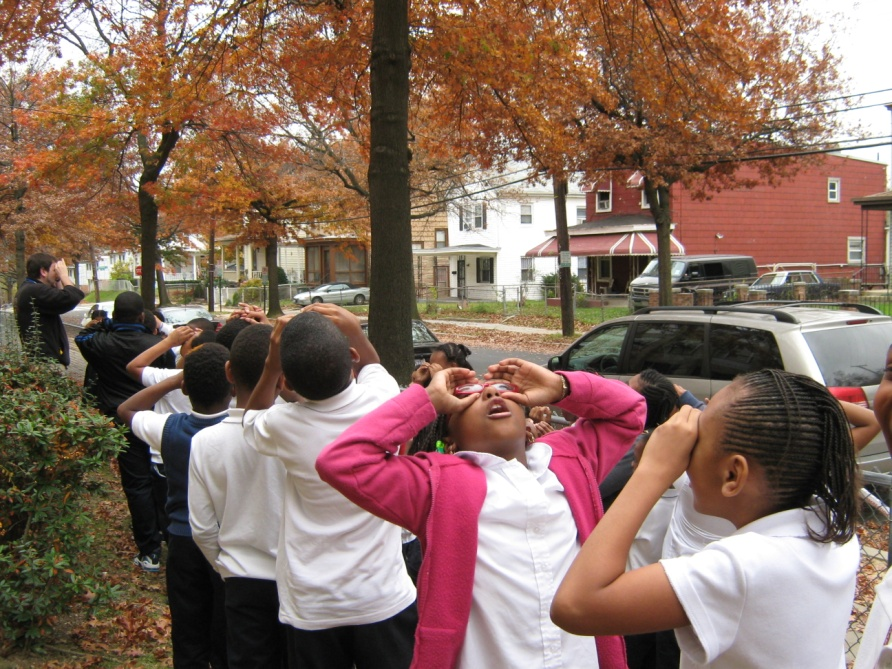
Students in Washington, D.C., pretending to use binoculars in search of their urban forest. MCT has worked with the United States Forest Service to develop programs.

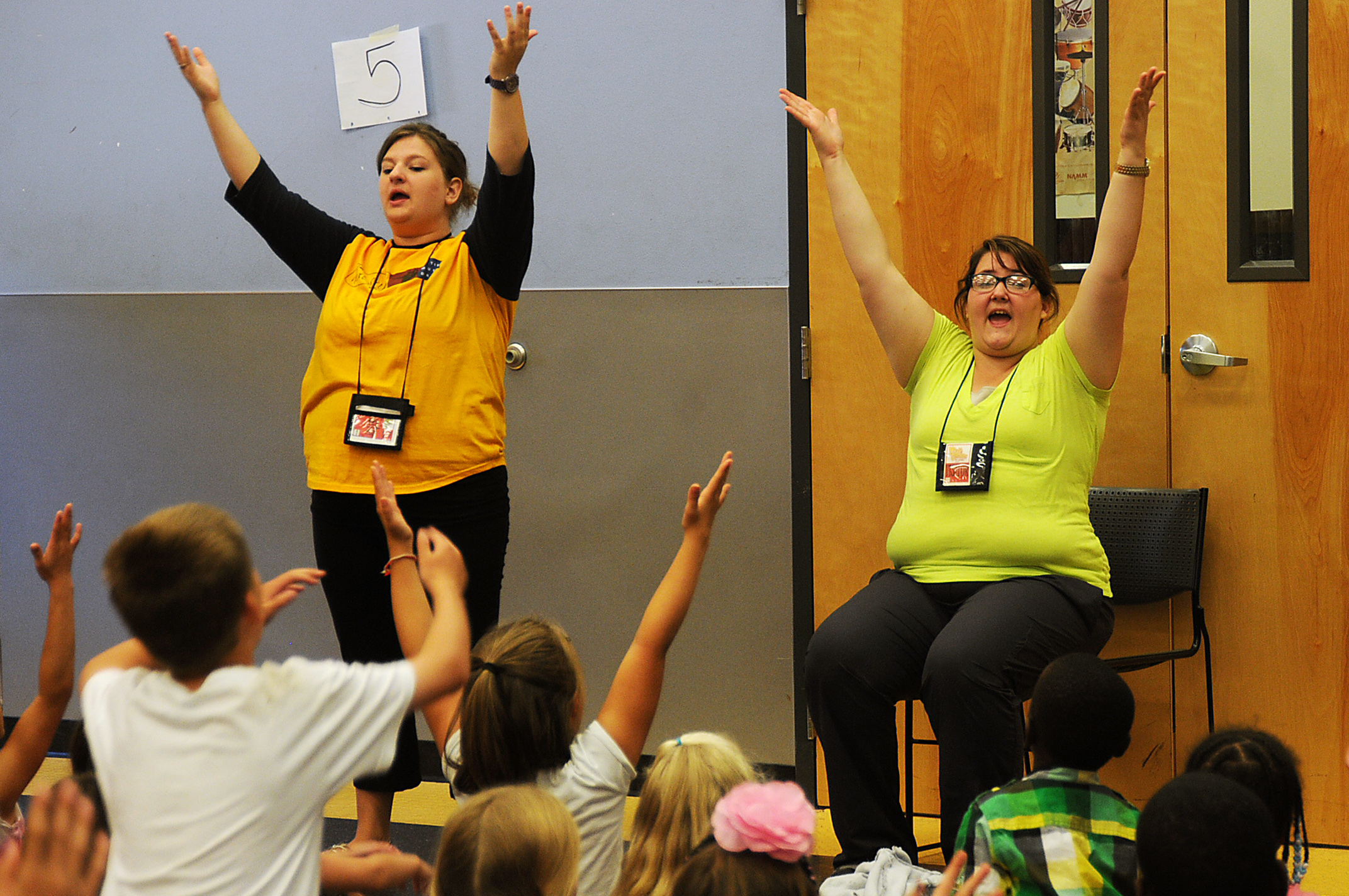
Adult directors-actors rehearsing with children for a performance at Naval Air Station Whidbey Island.

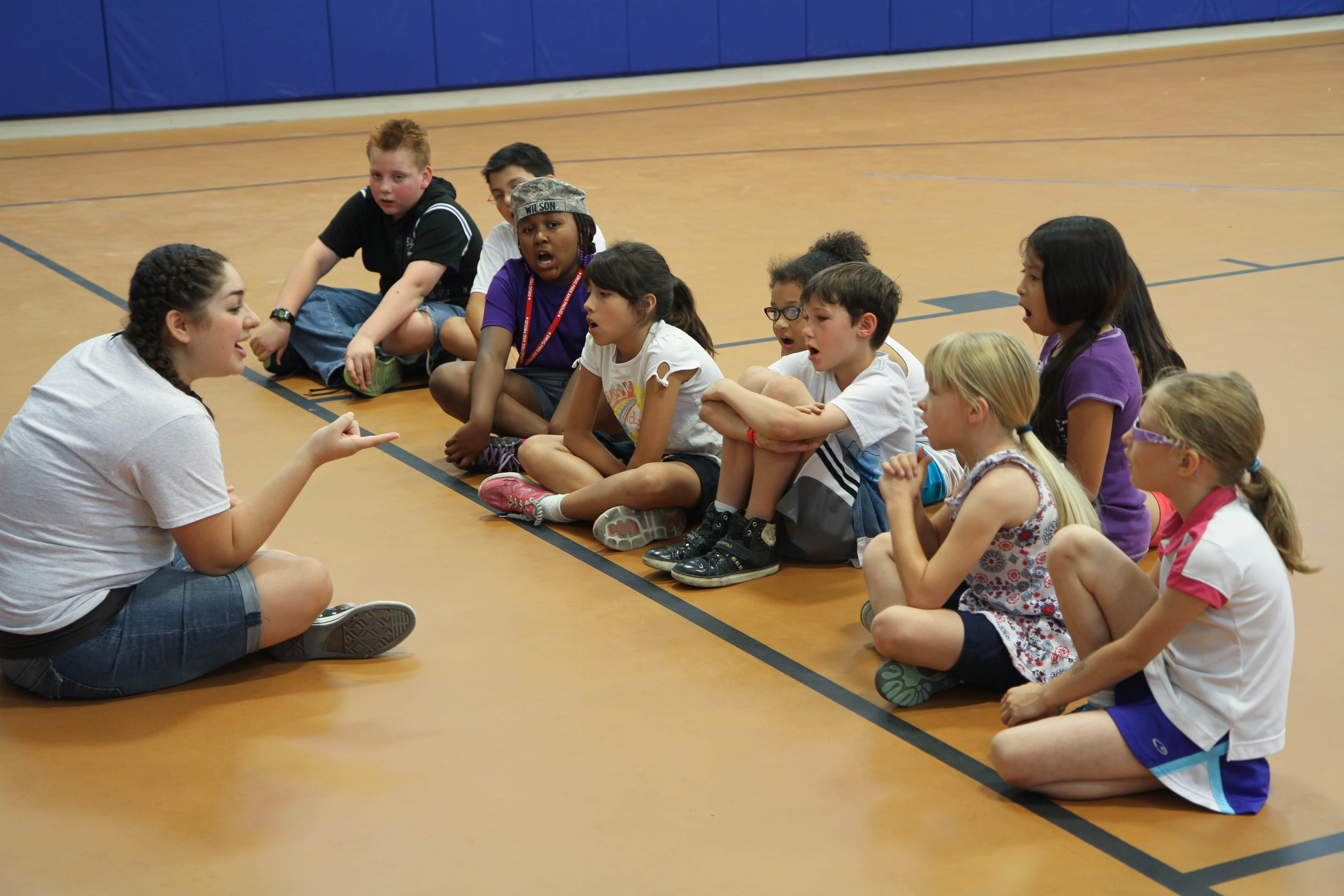
A MCT actor-director working with children for a production of Pinocchio in Texas.

== Notable alumna ==
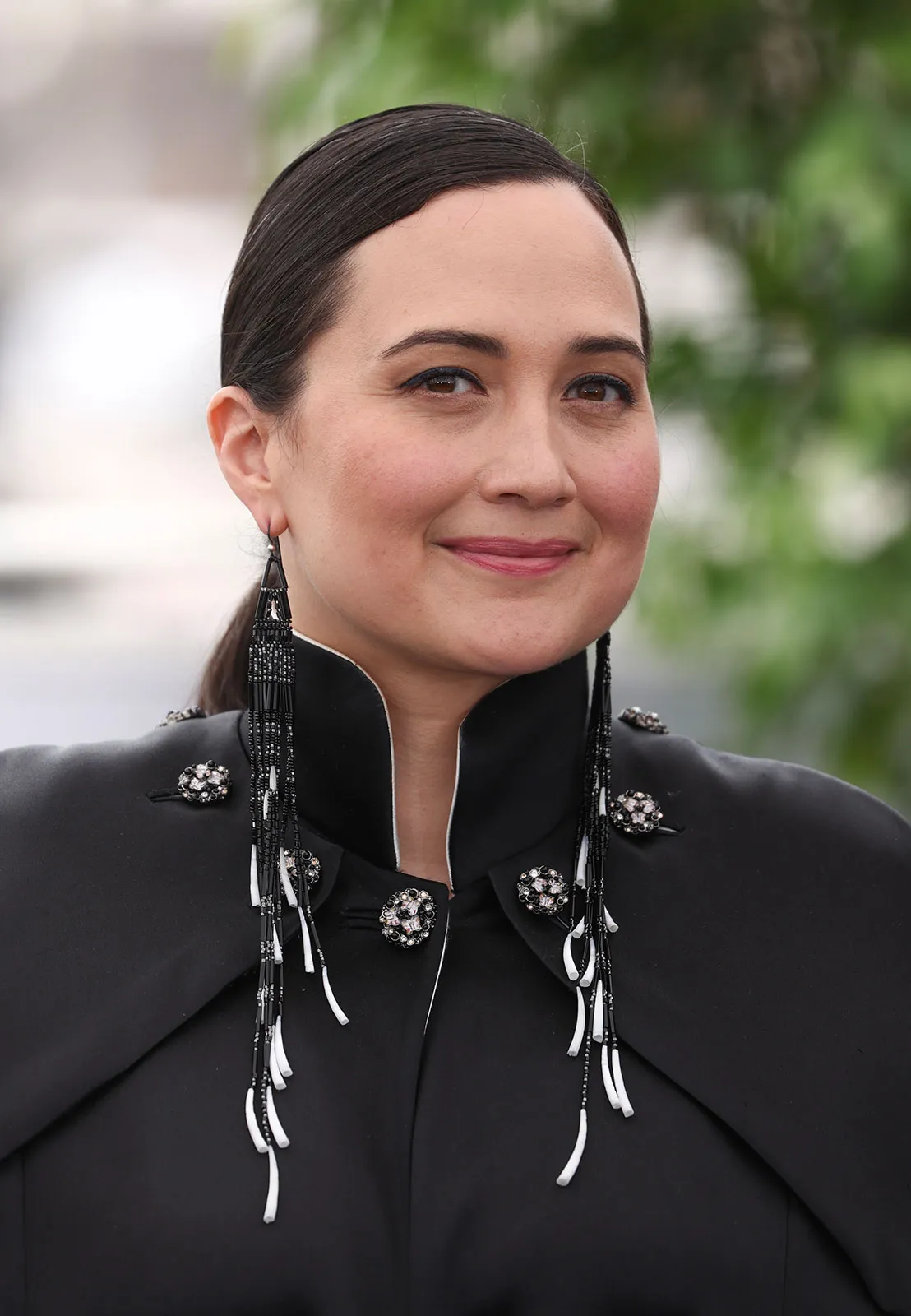
Lily Gladstone

- Lily Gladstone was cast in a Missoula Children's Theatre production of Cinderella when the program visited her childhood hometown of East Glacier, Montana. As an adult, she won the Golden Globe Award for Best Actress for her role in Killers of the Flower Moon in 2024, the first Native American woman to do so. She also was the first Indigenous actor to win the Screen Actors Guild Award for Best Female Actor, as well as the first Native American woman to be nominated for the Academy Award for Best Actress. She explained: "I just remember how much it meant to me when MCT would come through ... It's like I know in every single one of those classes there's a little me."
