= OK boomer =

Catchphrase and internet meme

"OK boomer" or "okay boomer" is a catchphrase and internet meme used to dismiss or mock attitudes typically associated with baby boomers – people born in the two decades following World War II. The phrase first drew widespread attention due to a November 2019 TikTok video in response to an older man, though the phrase had been coined years before that. The phrase has developed into a retort for resistance to technological change, climate change denial, marginalization of members of minority groups, or opposition to younger generations' values more generally. Critics of the term perceive it as ageist, though that view has been publicly ridiculed. It has been noted as a marker of intergenerational conflict.

== Origin ==
The first recorded instance of "OK boomer" is in a Reddit comment on 29 September 2009, and it appeared from 2015 on 4chan, to refer to others who seemed out of touch with the modern world. Reason magazine credited the journalist Taylor Lorenz with popularizing the term "OK boomer" in a story declaring "the end of friendly generational relations". "OK boomer" reached mass popularity in late 2019 as a reaction to an unidentified older man's rant on TikTok condemning "infantile" younger generations "hobbled" by social media and participation trophies. He said, "millennials and Generation Z have the Peter Pan syndrome ... they don't ever want to grow up [and] they think that the utopian ideals that they have in their youth are somehow going to translate into adulthood". Thousands of viewers responded with "OK boomer" as "a sophisticated, mass retaliation" against the impact of past generations.

== Usage ==
The phrase has been used as a retort for perceived resistance to technological change, climate change denial, or opposition to younger generations' opinions. Various media publications have noted the meme's usage on social media platforms beyond TikTok, and The New York Times wrote that "teenagers use it to reply to cringey YouTube videos, Donald Trump tweets, and basically any person over 30 who says something condescending about young people – and the issues that matter to them." As of November 2022, videos tagged with #OkBoomer on TikTok had been viewed about 4 billion times.

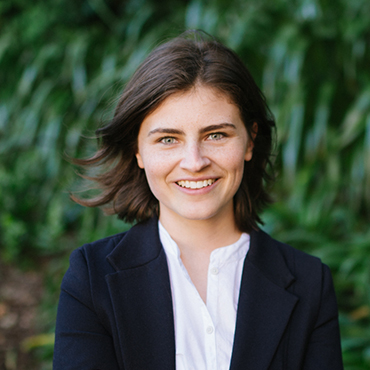
New Zealand MP Chlöe Swarbrick (a millennial) reacted to a heckle from fellow MP Todd Muller with the phrase "OK boomer" in 2019.

In early November 2019, while giving a speech supporting a climate change bill, New Zealand MP Chlöe Swarbrick claimed that the average age of parliamentarians was 49 years old, and MP Todd Muller, himself a Gen Xer and not a boomer, interrupted her, to which she responded "OK boomer". She wrote in an article in The Guardian that her comment "symbolised exhaustion of multiple generations". Swarbrick received widespread support on social media, as well as criticism for allegedly promoting ageism, including by the MP Chris Bishop.

Swarbrick: How many world leaders for how many decades have seen and known what is coming but have decided that it is more politically expedient to keep it behind closed doors? My generation and the generations after me do not have that luxury. In the year 2050 I will be 56 years old, yet right now, the average age of this 52nd Parliament is 49 years old.

Todd Muller: That's impossible.

Swarbrick: OK boomer.

A July 2019 song titled "OK boomer" fuelled the meme like an anthem, with cutting lyrics. During halftime of the Harvard-Yale football game on 23 November 2019, climate change protesters interrupted the game by rushing the field and remained even after they were asked to leave, instead chanting "OK boomer."

On 9 January 2020, during the Jeopardy! The Greatest of All Time tournament, "OK boomer" was the answer to a 400-point question in the "OK" category: "A 2019 New York Times article says this two-word phrase 'marks the end of friendly generational relations'." Ken Jennings elicited laughter from the audience with the response, "I get to say it to Alex! What is 'OK, boomer'?" The phrase was used by US Supreme Court Chief Justice John Roberts on 15 January 2020, as part of questioning for the Babb v. Wilkie age discrimination case.

On 2 March 2020, streamer Neekolul posted a video of lip-syncing and dancing to the song "Oki Doki Boomer" by YouTube content creator Senzawa while wearing a Bernie 2020 shirt. With more than 6 million views in four days, and more than 30 million that month, the video has been described by viewers as both cute and cringey.

== Reception ==
Many reactions have been positive. According to India Ross of the Financial Times, the phrase has "come to symbolise a generational cultural fracture" with attacks on its use from baby boomers perhaps only serving to increase its power and use. Clémence Michallon of The Independent applauded the phrase as "just the right amount of dismissive" while warning against its overuse. Miyo McGinn of Grist applauded the term, writing, "This joy undeniably stems from righteous indignation as much as simple amusement—the two words feel downright poetic after years of hearing my generation blamed for 'killing' everything from restaurant chains to department stores to relationships." Some have commented that the term should be considered a shorthand term for "The Establishment" rather than targeting a specific age group.

Some commentators have considered the phrase to be ageist. The conservative radio host Bob Lonsberry went as far as labeling the word "boomer" as "the N-word of ageism" in a widely criticized and soon deleted tweet. Furthermore, Lonsberry stated that "being hip and flip does not make bigotry OK, nor is a derisive epithet acceptable because it is new". The Late Show with Stephen Colbert mocked him: "Clearly this fella needs to play the hot new game: 'Is This The New N-Word?' No, it's not. Thank you for playing." Francine Prose of The Guardian suggested that the phrase reflects general cultural acceptance of discrimination against older generations. Also writing for The Guardian, Bhaskar Sunkara criticized the meme and said that baby boomers instead "need solidarity" because many "older workers and retirees are struggling to survive" as "half of Americans approaching age 65 have less than $25,000 in savings". In an interview, AARP executive Myrna Blyth told Axios, "OK, millennials. But we're the people that actually have the money." Several French politicians have also accused the phrase of being ageist, with MP Audrey Dufeu Schubert (Renaissance) deeming it an ageist slur in a special report on "succeeding in bridging the generational gap and fighting ageism".

"OK boomer" was one of the top five words for the year 2019 as selected by readers of a blog published on PublicAddress.net. It was nominated for a similar designation by a university in Switzerland, landing in second place. The phrase is on Lake Superior State University's 45th annual Banished Words List.

=== Commercialization ===
The phrase has been used commercially to sell merchandise and has been the subject of multiple trademark applications. A hoodie bearing the phrase "OK boomer have a terrible day", designed by US art student Shannon O’Connor, generated more than US$25,000 in sales by 1 November 2019. Multiple trademark applications were filed for "OK boomer", including one from Fox Media in 2019 with the intent to launch "an ongoing television series featuring reality competition, comedy, and game shows".

== Variations ==
=== OK zoomer ===
Some writers and critics of the "OK boomer" meme responded with their own generational hostilities, particularly aimed towards the digital natives of Generation Z who are sometimes referred to as "zoomers".

In The Spectator, columnist Cosmo Landesman wrote, "I suspect that future generations will want to stick the boot into the boomers too, but Generation Z will provoke nothing but a yawn. Their children will look at them and their infatuation with the latest bit of digital technology, roll their eyes and declare: OK zoomer." Comedian Bill Maher also took aim at what he described as a sense of impatience and moral superiority among Generation Z's activists such as environmentalist Greta Thunberg, in a "New Rule" segment for his HBO current events program Real Time titled "OK Zoomer."

Responding to such criticisms, staff editor of The Bi-College News (Note: The student newspaper of Bryn Mawr and Haverford Colleges) Viviana Freyer wrote, "When it is our turn to take the heat from 'Generation Alpha' and whatever generation comes next, we hopefully will understand that this comes with getting older, and we'll take the jokes with more grace than some thirty-something on Twitter getting overly defensive over side parts or cursive."

=== OK groomer ===
Colloquially, the word "groomer" refers to child grooming, when a person attempts to form trusting relationships with children, or their families or caregivers, in order to sexually abuse them. Originally, "OK groomer" was used on social media to address YouTube personality Onision, who had been accused of grooming young fans in 2020 and was the subject of a documentary produced by Chris Hansen.

== See also ==
- A group where we all pretend to be boomers
- "Don't trust anyone over 30"
- Gammon (insult)
- Generationism
- Generation snowflake
- Intergenerational conflict
- Kids these days
- Me generation
- Glossary of Generation Z slang
- Counterculture of the 1960s
- The MTV Generation
