= A group where we all pretend to be boomers =

Facebook group for users to pretend to be baby boomers

- Website type: Facebook group
- Available in: English
- Website: Official page on Facebook
- Commercial: Yes
- Users: ~283,000
- Launched: 12 May 2019
- Current status: Online

A group where we all pretend to be boomers is a Facebook group created in May 2019, for users – the majority of whom are millennials and in Generation Z – to pretend to be baby boomers. The group has been described as "digital larping". The members of the group post in the manner of a stereotypical internet user from the baby boomer generation.

== Content ==
The group was created in May 2019 by two 20-year-olds. Membership of the group grew rapidly in late June 2019 following a tweet which went viral, and in July 2019, the group had roughly 10,000 posts per day. In 2019, the majority of group members were between 23 and 28 years old. There were members of all ages, including those from the boomer generation itself.

Members of the group post in character as a stereotypical baby boomer. The style of speech used in the group has been termed a register called "boomerspeak" by linguist Gretchen McCulloch. Examples of this manner of speech include posts with spelling mistakes, posts written in all capitals, non sequiturs, and the large use of GIFs of Minions. Due to older people more readily sharing fake news on Facebook, many members ironically post fake news in the group, in imitation.

As older people are stereotypically seen as being more conservative, there have been posts which imitate the perceived style of conservative baby boomers, using racist or bigoted language. This has caused problems, as Facebook does not largely moderate private groups itself, but leaves it to the group moderators; as such, some posts have to be deleted. Some of the group's moderators have called on Facebook to provide more guidance on what is and is not allowed on the platform. Multiple occasions of Australian Facebook groups being "zucced" (banned by Facebook) has prompted the creation of an independent forum called A Forum Where We Pretend to Be Boomers.

== Response ==
The group has been described as being successful for several reasons, including its comedic properties, envy of the boomer generation from the younger generations, and as a reaction to the often negative stereotyping of millennials by older people. Dr Elissa Perry said in The Guardian that "a very common reaction to stereotyping is the denigration of the other". Other sources, including ORF, have described this as being part of a "generational conflict", which has been linked to the political climate, where old and young people broadly disagree on political topics.

The group has led to several spin-off groups, including "a group where we all pretend to be millennials", "a group where we all pretend to be ants in an ant colony" (which attracted over 1.8 million members), and "a group where we all pretend to be boomers pretending to be millennials".

== See also ==
- Ageism
- Facebook
- Intergenerationality
- OK boomer
