= Intergenerational policy =

An intergenerational policy is a public policy that incorporates an intergenerational approach to addressing an issue or has an impact across the generations. Approaching policy from an intergenerational perspective is based on an understanding of the interdependence and reciprocity that characterizes the relationship between the generations.

An intergenerational approach to public policy recognizes that generations share basic needs including adequate income, access to quality health care and social services, educational and employment opportunities, and a safe place to live. Furthermore, policies that are supportive of any age group must build on the common concerns of all generations.

Intergenerational policy is also understood as current efforts on intergenerational justice, both by governmental and non-governmental institutions that distribute resources between the generations. There are two types of intergenerational policies: descriptive and programmatic. Descriptive intergenerational policy includes all efforts to institutionalize individual and collective relations between the generations in the private and public spheres. On the other hand, programmatic intergenerational policy refers to establishing societal conditions that allow the creation of private and public intergenerational relations in the present and future in a way that guarantees the development of a responsible and community-oriented personality on the one hand and of societal progress on the other.

Literature includes at least five models intergenerational policies. These are: (1) intergenerational social integration; (2) linking strategies of social policy towards old age and older adults (ageing policy); (3) dimensions of an intergenerational policy covering environmental policy, architectural policy, (inter)cultural policy, education policy, economic policy, labour market policy and healthcare policy; (4) United Nations’ “Society For All Ages“ concept; and (5) the European Union's concept of the “silver economy”.
