= Intergenerational struggle =

Sociology

The intergenerational struggle is the economic conflict between successive generations of workers because of the public pension system where the first generation has better pension benefit and the last must pay more taxes, have a greater tax wedge and a lower pension benefit due to the public debt that the states make in order to pay the current public spending.

== See also ==
- Parent–offspring conflict
- Student protests of 1968
- Intergenerational Equity
- Millennial
- Boomer
