= Pseudo pronoun =

Pseudo pronoun is a word that under certain circumstances functions as a pronoun. For example, an English article "the" can function as a possessive pronoun: I had visited a small cafe today. The staff was friendly, with "the" playing the cohesive role of "its".

French linguists use the term pseudo pronom for dummy pronouns, employed in situations where there is no underlying semantics, but the syntactic rules require use of a noun: il neige, "it snows". The term is also applied in French to neopronouns, like iel, introduced to provide gender neutrality (absent among French third-person pronouns), but not part of the official language as defined by Académie Française.

== French bibi ==
A more complex example of a pseudo pronoun is French: bibi. Originally an argot word dating back to at least 1832, it references the speaker himself in the third person, as in et c'est bibi qui paie les pots cassés, "and it's me who pays the price".

The etymology of the word is disputed, with Cellard and Rey in 1991 suggesting the roots in nursery rhymes (cf. Bibi Lolo). At first a proper (and properly capitalized) noun, Bibi eventually became a nickname, then the capital first letter became optional, and one of the current meanings is an emphasized form of moi, "me".

Gradually the expression became colloquial, giving rise to the 2020s meme C'est Nicolas qui paie, "Nicolas is the one paying".

== Sources ==
- Bremner, Charles (13 August 2025). "'We are Nicolas': inside France's middle-class revolt worrying Macron". The Times.
- Cohen, Roger; Gallois, Léontine (28 November 2021). "In a Nonbinary Pronoun, France Sees a U.S. Attack on the Republic". The New York Times. ISSN 0362-4331. Archived from the original on 13 December 2021.
- Mautner, Gerlinde; Ross, Christopher J. (2023-06-19). English Academic Writing: A Guide for the Humanities and Social Sciences. UTB. ISBN 978-3-8252-6028-6.
- Rullier-Theuret, Françoise (2007). "«Et moi, dit bibi, dit mézigue, dit ma pomme, dit mégnace». L'argot et les pseudo pronoms chez San-Antonio" ["And me, called Bibi, called Mézigue, called Ma Pomme, called Mégnace". Slang and pseudo-pronouns in San-Antonio]. L'Information Grammaticale (in French). 115 (1): 11–16. doi:10.3406/igram.2007.3925. ISSN 0222-9838.
- Van Den Eynde, Karel; Mertens, Piet (2003). "La valence: l'approche pronominale et son application au lexique verbal" [Valence: the pronominal approach and its application to the verbal lexicon]. Journal of French Language Studies (in French). 13 (1): 63–104. doi:10.1017/S0959269503001005. ISSN 0959-2695.
