= Intergenerationality =

Interaction between members of different generations

Intergenerationality is interaction between members of different generations. Sociologists study many intergenerational issues, including equity, conflict, and mobility.

Public health researchers and toxicologists may study the intergenerational impact of toxicants of radioactive fallout from generation to generation.

== Applicable concepts ==
- Intergenerational equity is the concept or idea of fairness or justice in relationships between children, youth, adults, seniors, and/or future generations, particularly in terms of treatment and interactions.
- Intergenerational conflict is conflict between two or more generations, which often involves all inclusive prejudices against another generation, or may refer specifically to conflict situations arising between teenagers and adults.
- Intergenerational cycle of violence is a pattern of violence or abuse that is passed from one generation to the next. Generally, an individual who witnesses domestic violence as a child is much more likely to be an abuser or a victim of domestic abuse in adulthood.
- Intergenerational mobility is a measure of the changes in social status which occurs from the parents' to the children's generation.
- An inter-generational contract is a dependency between different generations based on the assumption that future generations, in honoring the contract, will provide a service to a generation that has previously provided the same service to an older generation.
- Intergenerational struggle is the economic conflict between successive generations of workers because of the public pension system where the first generation has better pension benefit and the last must pay more taxes, have a greater tax wedge and a lower pension benefit due to the public debt that the states make in order to pay the current public spending.
- Intergenerational policies are public policies that incorporate an intergenerational approach to addressing an issue or have an impact across the generations.
- Intergenerational shared sites are programs in which children, youth and older adults participate in ongoing services and/or programming concurrently at the same site, and where participants interact during regularly scheduled planned intergenerational activities, as well as through informal encounters.
- Inter-generational ministry is a model of Christian ministry which emphasizes relationships between age groups and encourages mixed-age activities.
- Intergenerational learning is the mutual and collaborative exchange of knowledge, skills, and experiences between different age cohorts. It occurs in formal, informal, or non-formal settings. In the workplace, it fosters individual growth and well-being, enhances institutional performance, and supports generational renewal.
- Intergenerational relationships are interactions between people of different age groups that influence creativity, knowledge exchange, problem-solving, and collective well-being. Inclusive and frequent contact fosters trust, reduces generational stereotypes, and promotes collaboration, whereas limited interaction can hinder the development of healthy, supportive, and mutually enriching connections across generations.

== Conflict ==
An intergenerational conflict is either a conflict situation between teenagers and adults or a more abstract conflict between two generations, which often involves all inclusive prejudices against another generation. This is a term describing one generation that, contrary to the will of another, will not help the other generation and also makes it difficult for the other generation to act.

Intergenerational conflict may be caused by shifts in values or conflicts of interest between younger and older generations. An example are changes to an inter-generational contract that may be necessary to reflect a change in demographics. It is associated with the term "generation gap".

According to social identity theory, people seek to classify themselves and others on the basis of perceived similarities and differences. Therefore, individuals may seek to classify themselves as belonging to a particular generation because they perceive oneness with traits popularly associated with other members of the group, and classify others into separate “out-groups” based on dissimilar characteristic. As individuals create in- and out-groups from generational identities, interactions between members can be impacted and conflict can occur. This bias between generations occurs because of the human need to belong to a social group to provide a sense of social identity, pride, and self esteem, but may also create stereotypes about those in different social groups, which may be generations. An example is how older members of Generation Alpha are ashamed to be part of their generation because they see other (often, younger) members of their generation as "iPad kids" who depend on technology, which leads to a desire to be considered members of Generation Z. The term Zalpha has also been used in this manner. The same effect was prevalent with older members of Gen Z in the early 2010s.

== Contract ==
Generational contract (also inter-generational contract) is a concept used in the research of the relations between generations within a society. It refers to an agreement or consensus regarding the roles and mutual responsibilities of different age groups or generations. The contract governs the relationships between overlapping generations and works to produce benefits for all age groups, often serving to tackle intergenerational friction or conflict. In the context of pension systems, it refers to a fictitious "solidarity contract" serving as the theoretical basis for a pay-as-you-go (PAYGO) system, where the working population finances the livelihood of the retired population and children.

The term does not define a legal contract, as no enforceable agreement exists between generations. Instead, it is a figurative description of the allocation of consumption possibilities across the three phases of life: childhood, working age, and old age. The concept is often employed as a tool used to study relations between generations, although its specific terms and parties are frequently not clearly defined by researchers.

== Cycle of violence ==
Intergenerational cycles of violence occur when violence is passed from father or mother to son or daughter, parent to child, or sibling to sibling. It often refers to violent behavior learned as a child and then repeated as an adult, therefore continuing on in a perceived cycle. An example of this would be when a child witnesses domestic abuse, they may go on to repeat that same pattern of behavior in future relationships.

== Equity ==
Global warming—the progression from cooler historical temperatures (blue) to recent warmer temperatures (red)—is being experienced disproportionately by younger generations.

Successive generations are predicted to experience progressively greater unprecedented lifetime exposure (ULE) events such as heat waves. About 111 million children born in 2020 will live with unprecedented heatwave exposure in a world that warms by 3.5 °C, compared with 62 million with only 1.5 °C of warming.

Intergenerational equity may be understood as equity in relation to equal rights under the law, such as security, political equity, voting rights, freedom of speech and assembly, property rights, economic equity, access to education, health care, and social security. "This equity can be horizontal—equal opportunities for the same generation in different collectivities—for example, young people in different countries. This equity is also vertical—different treatment of different generations in order to compensate for differences in, for example, education and place of origin."

Intergenerational equity, in the sociological and psychological context, is the concept or idea of fairness or justice in relationships between children, youth, adults and seniors, particularly in terms of treatment and interactions. It has been studied in environmental and sociological settings. In the context of institutional investment management, intergenerational equity is the principle that an endowed institution's spending rate must not exceed its after-inflation rate of compound return, so that investment gains are spent equally on current and future constituents of the endowed assets. This concept was originally set out in 1974 by economist James Tobin, who wrote that, "The trustees of endowed institutions are the guardians of the future against the claims of the present. Their task in managing the endowment is to preserve equity among generations."

Conversations about intergenerational equity occur across several fields. They include transition economics, social policy, and government budget-making. Intergenerational equity is also explored in environmental concerns, including sustainable development, global warming and climate change.

Conversations about intergenerational equity are also relevant to social justice arenas as well, where issues such as health care are equal in importance to youth rights and youth voice are pressing and urgent. There is a strong interest within the legal community towards the application of intergenerational equity in law.

== Intergenerational policies ==
An intergenerational policy is a public policy that incorporates an intergenerational approach to addressing an issue or has an impact across the generations. Approaching policy from an intergenerational perspective is based on an understanding of the interdependence and reciprocity that characterizes the relationship between the generations. These basic needs include things such as income, health care, social services, educational policy, employment policy, and architectural and environmental policies. Intergenerational policies include but are not limited to discourse and ways of resource distribution between generations. Such policies may be forced upon other generations through physical force or through symbolic violence by another generation, but can also be created through dialogue.

Intergenerational policies can be targeted to increase age integration by facilitating interaction between people of different age groups by supporting physical proximity, developing common interests, or by other mechanisms. The purpose of integration is to eliminate social barriers and difficulties associated with age, including discrimination on the grounds of age. These policies contain specific programs and actions aimed at supporting simultaneous participation of children, youth, and older adults.

An intergenerational approach to public policy recognizes that generations share basic needs including adequate income, access to quality health care and social services, educational and employment opportunities, and a safe place to live. Further, policies that are supportive of any age group must build on the common concerns of all generations.

== Christianity ==
Intergenerational ministry is a model of Christian ministry which emphasizes relationships between age groups and encourages mixed-age activities. Intergenerational ministry stands in contrast with other modes of ministry more traditionally seen in local churches, such as Sunday schools and youth ministries.

Children, and sometimes adults, are instructed by teachers who are, typically, adults. Classes are usually divided by age groups, as in secular schools. In youth ministries, teens or young adults (especially college age) gather in groups presided over by a "youth minister". These groups, which are often part of parachurch organizations, focus on peer fellowship and instruction of their members.

Inter-generational ministry is one of a number of movements which have arisen in response over concerns that young adults very commonly cease participation in church, and often do not return. Proponents of the inter-generational ministry movement hold that the hierarchical and didactic roles found in traditional church ministries deprive teens and young adults of a sense of purpose and involvement, since their role in these ministries is passive and subordinate, and since they are often kept separate from adult activities. Therefore, they propose that younger members should take active roles in the ministry of the local church, and that church activities should involve and encourage participation from members across a wide range of ages.

A second thread in the inter-generational ministry movement is that of family involvement. Concerns over divorce, abuse and other family disruptions led to criticism of how traditional church activities typically segregate family members according to age, thus de-emphasizing family relationships. Inter-generational activities were seen as a means to involve families as units, thus reinforcing family bonds.

Intergenerationality in religion can be conceptualized as the transmission of religious practices, beliefs, or affiliations from parent to child. This approach identifies parents as possessing religious agency and places young people as passive recipients of religion and the behavioral characteristics associated with a particular kind of faith. Research also finds that children serve in a reciprocal approach, where the young person might influence the adult's religiosity and practices of worship and faith.

Studies show that children attending Sunday Schools and youth programs are less likely to continue church involvement, compared to those who attended worship with parents, and are integrated into a community. Those children who continue church involvement as adults often have a 'nominal faith'.

== See also ==
- Generational accounting
- Transgenerational design
- Transgenerational trauma
- Intergenerational shared site
- National memory
- Cultural memory

== Sources ==
- Zechner, Minna; Sihto, Tiina (2024). "The concept of generational contract: A systematic literature review". International Journal of Social Welfare. 33 (3): 710–723. doi:10.1111/ijsw.12636. hdl:10138/572474.
- Schreiber, Wilfrid (1955). Existenzsicherheit in der industriellen Gesellschaft [Existential Security in Industrial Society] (in German). Vol. 3. Schriftenreihe des Bundes katholischer Unternehmer.
