= C'est Nicolas qui paie =

French political slogan

"C'est Nicolas qui paie" (lit. 'It's Nicolas who pays') is a French political slogan and viral meme that gained prominence in 2025. It centers on a fictional character, "Nicolas", representing France's urban, university-educated, and middle-class millennials. The slogan is used to express this demographic's feeling of "downward mobility" (déclassement) and frustration that they are being "milked" by high taxes to fund a social model from which they perceive little benefit.

The expression, which emerged around 2020, was adopted by conservative and far-right political figures. It has also been associated with racist remarks online.

== The "Nicolas" archetype ==
The "Nicolas" of the slogan is a fictional character, described as a thirtysomething professional living in a small Paris flat. He is depicted as the "average Frenchman" who, despite having a university degree and a job, feels "crushed" by taxes and social contributions. The core of the sentiment is that "Nicolas" is forced to finance the pensions of "boomers", represented by "Chantal and Bernard", and social benefits for other groups, while he and his wife struggle to access homeownership.

Some media coverage noted that the "Nicolas" archetype is specifically "white" and is sometimes contrasted with figures like "Karim, the Muslim-African immigrant". The French news service RTL reported that the hashtag had been "hijacked" by some users to spread "racist remarks".

== Political adoption and reaction ==
The slogan, which originated from an anonymous X account, NicolasQuiPaie, saw a surge in popularity following budget proposals from Prime Minister François Bayrou's government.

=== Adoption by the right ===
The expression was brought to the National Assembly on April 29, 2025, by Gérault Verny, a deputy from the Union des droites pour la République (UDR). Verny described "Nicolas" as being "fiscally harassed" and "despoiled" by the state. Other conservative politicians, such as Bruno Retailleau and Jonas Haddad of The Republicans, also used the phrase to criticize the government's fiscal policy.

On June 20, 2025, the phrase was trademarked by Artefakt, a company where Verny is a shareholder. Erik Tegner, the president of Artefakt and director of the far-right media outlet Frontières, stated the purpose was to "sanctuary" the brand from "leftist trolls".

=== Government and left-wing reaction ===
The trend reportedly worried aides of President Emmanuel Macron, as the demographic represented by "Nicolas" was a core part of his initial support base. The government, including the finance ministry (Bercy) and the prime minister's office (Matignon), closely monitored the phenomenon. An advisor to the prime minister told RTL that the government "made the same observation as the Nicolas-supporters: that the social system weighs too heavily on the active population."

Critics on the left, such as former presidential advisor Gaspard Gantzer, described the "Nicolas" character as a Trojan horse for "reactionary identity politics."

== Analysis ==
The creator of the anonymous X account that propelled the meme claimed to be apolitical, but voiced admiration for Javier Milei, the libertarian president of Argentina. The creator also explicitly distanced the "Nicolas" movement from the gilets jaunes.

Political analyst Jérôme Fourquet also distinguished the two, describing the "Nicolas" phenomenon as a right-wing frustration over taxes, in contrast to the gilets jaunes. The slogan has been called a new take on an older French expression, "C'est bibi qui paie" ("I'm the one who pays").

In January 2026, economist Xavier Timbeau published an economic analysis for the Observatoire français des conjonctures économiques (OFCE) examining the economic validity of the Nicolas meme that compares a young active worker to retirees or benefit recipients. Using data from the World Inequality Database, the study identified the "equilibrium point" in the French fiscal system—the income level where an individual's tax contributions equal the value of public benefits and services received. The analysis found that this tipping point is located at the 70th percentile of the income distribution, meaning that net contributors to the system belong to the wealthiest 30% of the population. Specifically, for a single person to be in the fiscal position of Nicolas (a net payer), they must earn approximately €4,200 gross monthly income (excluding pension contributions), which corresponds to a net after-tax income of €2,550. Consequently, the vast majority of the population,including many who might identify with the meme, are actually net beneficiaries of the French redistribution system.

== Sources ==
- Bellier, Arthur (July 21, 2025). "«C'est Nicolas qui paie» : d'où vient cette expression virale sur les réseaux sociaux et pourquoi inquiète-t-elle le gouvernement ?" ["It's Nicolas who pays": where does this viral expression on social networks come from and why is it worrying the government?]. RTL (in French).
- Boutin, Gilles (21 October 2025). "«C'est Nicolas qui paie» : pourquoi les trentenaires d'aujourd'hui ont de vraies raisons de se sentir déclassés" ["It's Nicolas who pays": why today's thirty-somethings have real reasons to feel downgraded]. Le Figaro (in French).
- Bremner, Charles (13 August 2025). "'We are Nicolas': inside France's middle-class revolt worrying Macron". The Times.
- Lesueur, Corentin; Pedro, Alexandre (25 July 2025). "«C'est Nicolas qui paie» : comment la droite et l'extrême droite s'approprient une colère anti-fiscale" ["It's Nicolas who pays": how the right and the far right are appropriating anti-tax anger]. Le Monde (in French).
- Timbeau, Xavier (15 January 2026). "Tous les Nicolas du monde" [All the Nicolas in the world]. OFCE (in French).
