= Intergenerational public procurement =

Intergenerational public procurement (IPP) is an emerging strategic approach to public spending that integrates the long-term interests of future generations into current government purchasing decisions. Unlike conventional public procurement, which often prioritizes immediate cost-efficiency and short-term delivery, IPP emphasizes "intergenerational equity" by accounting for lifecycle costs and socio-environmental impacts over extended time scales.

In the context of the European Union, this alignment is increasingly reflected in Sustainable Public Procurement (SPP) frameworks, which utilize "Most Economically Advantageous Tender" (MEAT) criteria to reward bids that offer long-term value, such as climate resilience and resource preservation. It is expected to be a component of SPP as a tool for responsible public finance.

Furthermore, international bodies like the OECD have advocated for the inclusion of youth and future stakeholders in the design of procurement policies to ensure that today’s infrastructure and service contracts do not impose disproportionate financial or environmental burdens on subsequent generations. By leveraging the vast scale of public markets, intergenerational procurement acts as a policy lever to address systemic challenges such as climate change and aging populations.

== Evolution and definition ==
The concept was introduced to the International Telecommunication Union (ITU) U4SSC framework in 2024 as a methodology for long-term city planning.

By 2026, discussions within U4SSC Working Group 5 expanded this framework to specifically address the "acquisition and governance of digital and data-enabled technologies." The proposed working definition characterizes the practice as the "transparent, participatory and anticipatory" management of such technologies to balance the needs of present and future generations while remaining within planetary boundaries.
