= Trinovi Khairani =

Indonesian politician (born 1996)

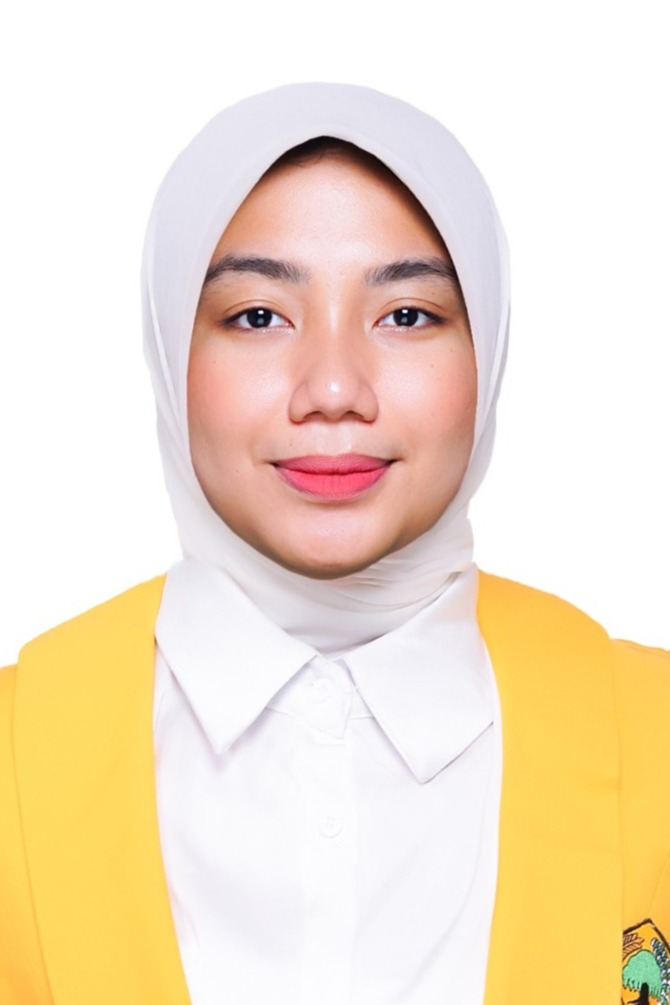
- Trinovi Khairani in 2023

Member of the House of Representatives
- Incumbent
- Assumed office 1 October 2024
- Constituency: North Sumatra II

Personal details
- Born: 16 November 1996 (age 29)
- Party: Golkar
- Parent: Khairuddin Syah Sitorus (father)
- Relatives: Hendri Yanto Sitorus (brother)

Trinovi Khairani Sitorus (born 16 November 1996) is an Indonesian politician serving as a member of the House of Representatives since 2024. She is the daughter of Khairuddin Syah Sitorus and the sister of Hendri Yanto Sitorus.
