= Generational contract =

Generational contract (also inter-generational contract) is a concept used in the research of the relations between generations within a society. It refers to an agreement or consensus regarding the roles and mutual responsibilities of different age groups or generations. The contract governs the relationships between overlapping generations and works to produce benefits for all age groups, often serving to tackle intergenerational friction or conflict. In the context of pension systems, it refers to a fictitious "solidarity contract" serving as the theoretical basis for a pay-as-you-go (PAYGO) system, where the working population finances the livelihood of the retired population and children.

The term does not define a legal contract, as no enforceable agreement exists between generations. Instead, it is a figurative description of the allocation of consumption possibilities across the three phases of life: childhood, working age, and old age. The concept is often employed as a tool used to study relations between generations, although its specific terms and parties are frequently not clearly defined by researchers.

== Definitions ==
Definitions of the contract vary in scope:

- Broad definition: Developed by Wilfrid Schreiber, this approach considers the labor income to be a "lifetime income" that can be earned in three phases: acquiring skills (youth), working (adulthood), and consumption (old age). A solidarity community must distribute income earned by the middle generation to support both the elderly and the young.
- Narrow definition: Often used by state institutions, this defines the contract as an unspoken agreement strictly between the contribution-paying generation and the pension-receiving generation. The young are viewed primarily as future contributors. In this view, the contract is essentially a state-organized maintenance obligation toward the elderly. This aligns with definitions that portray the generational contract as a synonym for macro-level social insurance entitlements and pay-as-you-go financing.

== Background and history ==
The concept of the generational contract originates from the conceptual history of social contract theory. In Jean-Jacques Rousseau's 1762 work on the social contract, society is formed to pool individual strengths against strong forces while allowing the individual to remain as free as before. The terms of such a contract do not need to be formally stated, but they must be recognized and apply equally to everyone.

Interest in social contract theories increased with the development of welfare states in the 20th century. John Rawls argued that individuals adopt fair principles of social cooperation because they face constraints in choosing principles that would solely advantage themselves. In the context of the welfare state, the concept addresses how legitimate redistribution of resources across generations can be secured.

=== Implementation in social security systems ===
The concept became particularly prominent in West Germany with the pension reform of 1957 under Chancellor Konrad Adenauer, which shifted the system from a capital-funded model to a PAYGO model. The underlying concept, known as the "Schreiber Plan" (after Wilfrid Schreiber), proposed a "solidarity contract between generations." However, the plan was only partially implemented:

- The working generation was obligated to finance pensions for the elderly.
- The proposed "childhood and youth pension" with the working generation also supporting the youth via contributions was omitted.
- Consequently, the cost of raising the next generation of contributors remained a private burden for parents, while pension entitlements remained tied strictly to employment income.

In Switzerland, the concept was introduced during the establishment of the Old Age and Survivors' Insurance (AHV) in 1947, which is also based on a PAYGO model.

== Types ==
Research on the subject typically distinguishes between two forms of generational contracts: formal and informal.

=== Formal generational contract ===
The formal generational contract is public and operates at the macro level. It is typically explicit, codified in legislation, welfare state structures, and policies. The parties involved are the state (or welfare state) and at least three generations: the young, the working age population, and older persons. In social policy, this involves reciprocal support between generations through intergenerational transfers via taxation and public social expenditure. Its aim is the just distribution of resources to address needs and risks faced across different stages of the life course.

=== Informal generational contract ===
The informal generational contract is private and operates at the micro level. It is generally implicit, existing in common practices among individuals, families, and kin. The parties involved are family generations, specifically children, parents, and grandparents. Support is based on family relations taking place across these generations. Parents invest in children, and actions such as being partnered and having children are understood as part of the contract to ensure family continuity.

== Components ==
A systematic literature review identified nine main components that define the generational contract:

- Explicit or implicit: Whether the contract is open and coded in legislation (formal) or less open and based on common practices (informal).
- Parties: The actors involved in the contract. Formal contracts involve the state and broad generational groups, while informal contracts involve specific family lineage members.
- Responsibilities: The duties allocated to different generations. For formal contracts, this includes paying taxes and contributions. For informal contracts, it includes having children, working, and caring for the young and old.
- What is distributed: The material and social goods exchanged. Formal contracts distribute pensions, social security, and care. Informal contracts distribute sustenance, care, housing, and money.
- Time: The contract is future-oriented and connects past, present, and future generations.
- Implementation: How the contract is put into practice. Formal contracts are implemented through the welfare state, social policy, and pension systems. Informal contracts are implemented through inheritance, cohabitation, and care.
- Value base: Formal contracts rely on trust, solidarity, collectivism, fairness, and justice. Informal contracts rely on trust, reciprocity, and interdependence.
- Risks: Factors that may jeopardize the contract. These include egoism, individualism, societal changes, lack of commitment, and generational conflict.
- Maintenance is required to keep the contract up. Formal contracts are maintained through government regulations. Informal contracts are maintained through traditions, norms, rituals (such as filial piety), affection, and duty.

== Economic and demographic implications ==
=== National income and savings ===
There is an ongoing debate regarding whether a capital-funded pension system generates higher overall economic savings—and thus higher national income—compared to a PAYGO generational contract.

- Chilean experiment: Following Chile's transition from PAYGO to a funded system, studies showed that savings rates did not necessarily increase and, in some cases, decreased due to high transition costs.
- Macroeconomic impact: Economists like Peter Orszag and Joseph Stiglitz argue that privatization alone does not increase national savings; the outcome depends on whether citizens simply replace other forms of savings with pension savings or if the state borrows to fund the transition.

=== Demographic change ===
The stability of the formal generational contract relies on a balanced demographic structure. In many industrial nations, the age structure is shifting toward an "urn shape" due to declining birth rates and rising life expectancy.

- As the Baby boomer generation retires (a process accelerating around 2025 in many Western nations), the ratio of contributors to beneficiaries worsens.
- This leads to financial strain, often requiring increased tax subsidies or higher contribution rates to maintain pension levels.
- Research suggests that maintaining existing pension levels without reform may require significant tax increases or an extension of the working life.

== Criticism and limitations ==
The concept has been criticized for its involuntary nature, as individuals are automatically part of the contract by being born. Individuals may not fully understand the terms or their role, and contracts may be unfair to those living in poverty or who are socially marginalized.

=== Three-generation vs. Two-generation contract ===
Critics such as the Jesuit sociologist Oswald von Nell-Breuning and sociologist Franz-Xaver Kaufmann argue that modern pension systems represent a flawed "two-generation contract" (workers supporting retirees) rather than the necessary "three-generation contract" (workers supporting both retirees and children).

- Transfer exploitation: Kaufmann argues that parents finance the "human capital" (children) that will eventually pay the pensions of the childless. Because child-rearing costs are private while pension benefits are socialized based on employment, parents may suffer from "transfer exploitation."
- Constitutional concerns: Former German President Roman Herzog criticized the system wherein a double-income childless couple receives two pensions, while a family that raised future contributors on a single income receives only one, calling it a violation of constitutional equity.

=== Gender and normativity ===
Research often relies on the normative idea of family generations and employment, which leads to the exclusion of childless adults and working-age people who are unemployed or unable to work. Studies have also been noted for failing to problematize the gendered and heteronormative nature of generational contracts. Additionally, the concept is often portrayed as apolitical, assuming path-dependency rather than reflecting changes in the political landscape.

== See also ==
- Intergenerational equity
- Intergenerational policy
- C'est Nicolas qui paie

== Sources ==
- Zechner, Minna; Sihto, Tiina (2024). "The concept of generational contract: A systematic literature review". International Journal of Social Welfare. 33 (3): 710–723. doi:10.1111/ijsw.12636. hdl:10138/572474.
- Schreiber, Wilfrid (1955). Existenzsicherheit in der industriellen Gesellschaft [Existential Security in Industrial Society] (in German). Vol. 3. Schriftenreihe des Bundes katholischer Unternehmer.
- Kaufmann, Franz-Xaver (1997). Herausforderungen des Sozialstaats [Challenges of the Welfare State] (in German). Suhrkamp. ISBN 3518120530.
- Werding, Martin (1998). Zur Rekonstruktion des Generationenvertrages: Ökonomische Zusammenhänge zwischen Kindererziehung, sozialer Alterssicherung und Familienleistungsausgleich [On the Reconstruction of the Generational Contract: Economic Connections Between Child Rearing, Social Old-Age Security, and Family Benefit Equalization] (in German). Mohr Siebeck. ISBN 3-16-146889-9.
- Mesa-Lago, Carmelo (1994). Changing social security in Latin America: toward alleviating the social costs of economic reform. Boulder: Lynne Rienner Publishers.
- Orszag, Peter R.; Stiglitz, Joseph E. (1999). Rethinking Pension Reform: Ten Myths About Social Security Systems. New Ideas About Old Age Security. Washington, D.C.: World Bank.
- Herzog, Roman (1996). "Gesichertes Leben" [Secured Life]. Zeitschrift der LVA Baden (in German). 4.
