= Intergenerational shared site =

Care facility shared by all ages

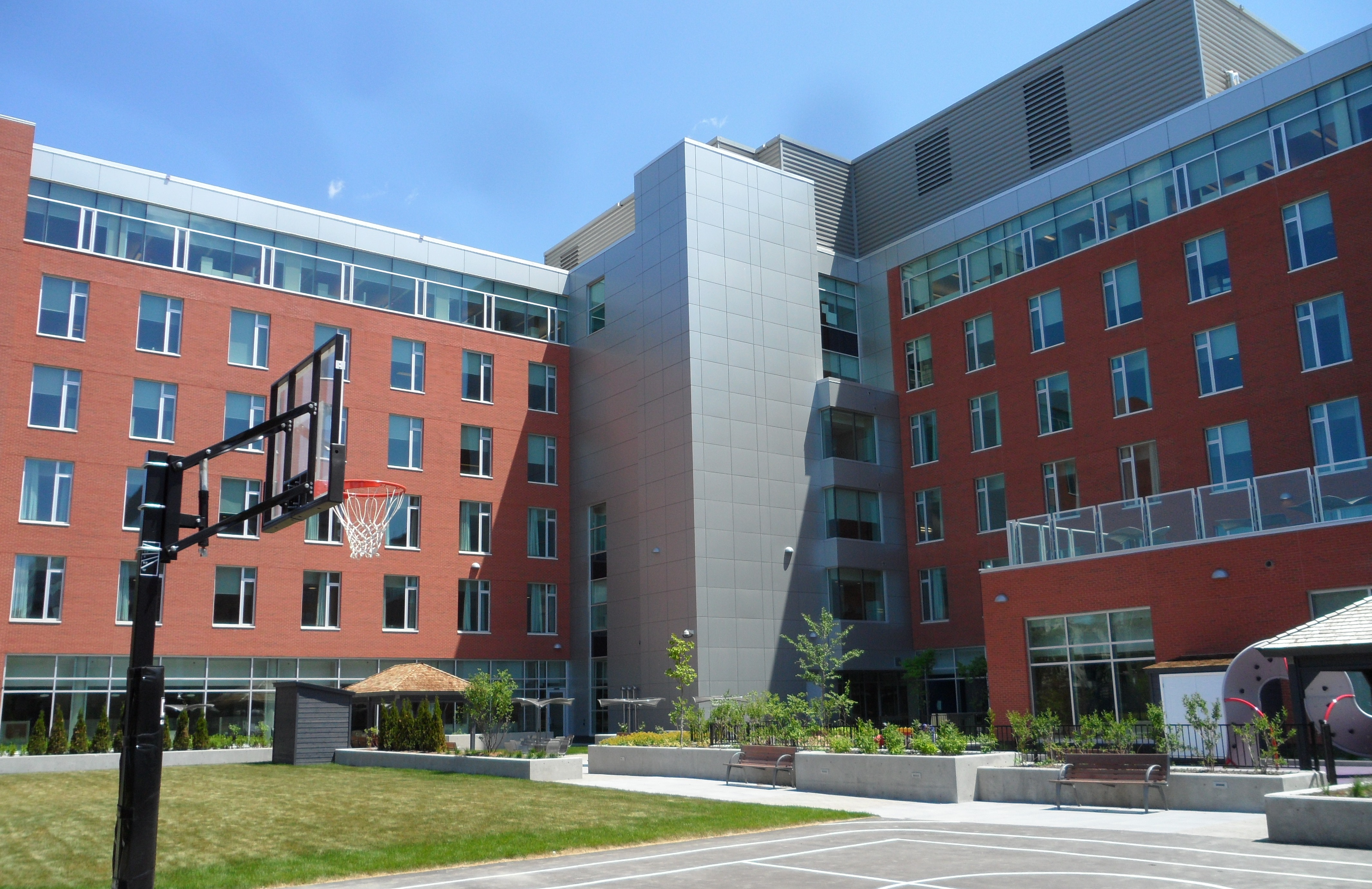
The Intergenerational Wellness Centre at the Centre for Addiction and Mental Health's Queen Street in Ontario, Canada (2012)

An intergenerational shared site is a facility where children, youth and older adults participate in ongoing services and/or programming concurrently at the same site. Participants at the site interact during regularly scheduled planned intergenerational activities, as well as through informal encounters. Intergenerational shared sites serve and provide care to children, youth, and older adults, and also act as a mechanism to address of the social implications of an increasingly age-segregated society.

== Description ==
Intergenerational shared sites are facilities where children, youth and older adults participate in ongoing services and/or programming concurrently at the same site, and where participants interact during regularly scheduled planned intergenerational activities, as well as through informal encounters.

== Benefits ==
Intergenerational shared sites serve and provide care to children, youth, and older adults, and also act as a mechanism to address of the social implications of an increasingly age-segregated society.

Benefits of shared sites include that they

- enhance quality of life for all participants
  - increase older adults' sense of belonging and well-being
  - increase children's and youth's social and emotional skills
- improve attitudes about different age groups
- provide needed services to the community
- increase cost savings for expenses related to personnel and rent
- create opportunities to share resources
- attract additional funding sources
- act as positive public relations/marketing tools
- decrease social isolation
