= Intergenerational equity =

Concept of fairness or justice between generations

Intergenerational equity in economic, psychological, and sociological contexts, is the notion of fairness or justice between generations. The concept can be applied to fairness in dynamics between children, youth, adults, and seniors. It can also be applied to fairness between generations currently living and future generations.

Conversations about intergenerational equity may include basic human needs, economic needs, environmental needs and subjective human well-being. It is often discussed in public economics, especially with regard to transition economics, social policy, and government budget-making. Many cite the growing U.S. national debt as an example of intergenerational inequity, as future generations will shoulder the consequences. Intergenerational equity is also explored in environmental concerns, including sustainable development, and climate change. The continued depletion of natural resources that has occurred in the past century will likely be a significant burden for future generations. Intergenerational equity is also discussed with regard to standards of living, specifically on inequities in the living standards experienced by people of different ages and generations. Intergenerational equity issues also arise in the arenas of elderly care, social justice, and housing affordability.

== Political rights ==
The debate around youth rights, children's rights and the rights of future generations includes discussions around when people should have political power, and how much they should have. Adam Benforado argues, for example, that giving children more political rights than adults results in everyone being better off by, for example, increasing the salience of long-term issues.

Those seeking rights or greater consideration for future generations discuss methods such as deliberative democracy, an ombudsman for future generations, or other institutions tasked specifically with considering future generations. Some advocates also want a child impact assessment of policies or decisions to evaluate outcomes for a specific child or even the next generation more broadly.

== Public economics usage ==
=== History ===
Since the first recorded debt issuance in Sumaria in 1796 BC, one of the penalties for failure to repay a loan has been debt bondage. In some instances, this repayment of financial debt with labor included the debtor's children, essentially condemning the debtor family to perpetual slavery. About one millennium after written debt contracts were created, the concept of debt forgiveness appears in the Old Testament, called Jubilee (Leviticus 25), and in Greek law when Solon introduces Seisachtheia. Both of these historical examples of debt forgiveness involved freeing children from slavery caused by their parents' debt.

The leaders of the Haudenosaunee Confederacy considered the precept of seven generation sustainability when making present decisions that could have significant impact on their potential future descendants.

Pope Francis, in his 2015 encyclical letter Laudato si', commented that

We can no longer speak of sustainable development apart from intergenerational solidarity. Once we start to think about the kind of world we are leaving to future generations, we look at things differently; we realize that the world is a gift which we have freely received and must share with others ... Intergenerational solidarity is not optional, but rather a basic question of justice.

=== Government debt ===
Higher government debt levels create significant costs for future taxpayers (e.g., higher taxes, lower government benefits, higher inflation, or increased risk of fiscal crisis). Stanley Druckenmiller and Geoffrey Canada call the large increase in government debt being left by the Baby Boomers to their children "Generational Theft".

Future generations could benefit if the investments made with the debt are more valuable than the amount of debt they created. For example, to the extent that borrowed funds are invested today to improve the long-term productivity of the economy and its workers, such as via useful infrastructure projects, future generations may benefit. Economist Paul Krugman wrote in March 2013 that by neglecting public investment and failing to create jobs, we are doing far more harm to future generations than merely passing along debt: "Fiscal policy is, indeed, a moral issue, and we should be ashamed of what we're doing to the next generation's economic prospects. But our sin involves investing too little, not borrowing too much."

=== Pensions ===
Underfunded pensions can shift costs to younger generations, which can be motivated by intergenerational selfishness. The U.S. Social Security system has provided a greater net benefit to those who reached retirement closest to the first implementation of the system. The system is unfunded, meaning the elderly who retired right after the implementation of the system did not pay any taxes into the social security system, but reaped the benefits. Professor Michael Doran estimates that cohorts born previous to 1938 will receive more in benefits than they pay in taxes, while the reverse is true to cohorts born after. Also, that the long-term insolvency of Social Security will likely lead to further intergenerational transfers. However, Doran concedes that other benefits have been introduced into U.S. society via the welfare system, like Medicare and government-financed medical research, that benefit current and future elderly cohorts.

=== Investment management ===
In the context of institutional investment management, intergenerational equity is the principle that an endowed institution's spending rate must not exceed its after-inflation rate of compound return, so that investment gains are spent equally on current and future constituents of the endowed assets. This concept was originally set out in 1974 by economist James Tobin, who wrote that "The trustees of endowed institutions are the guardians of the future against the claims of the present. Their task in managing the endowment is to preserve equity among generations."

== Environmental usage ==
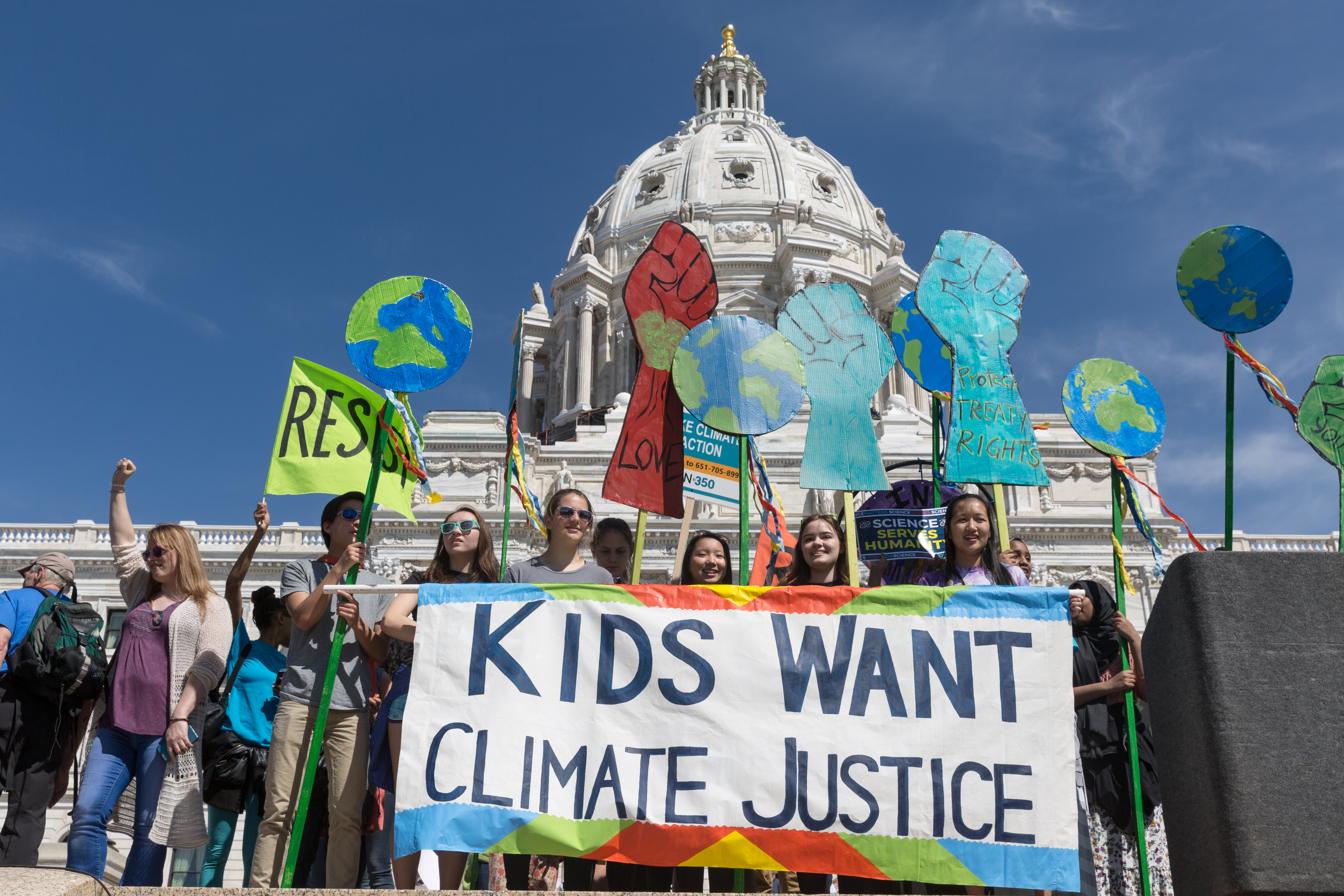
Global warming is an example of intergenerational inequity, see climate justice.

Intergenerational equity is often referred to in environmental contexts, as younger age cohorts will disproportionately experience the negative consequences of environmental damage. For instance, it is estimated that children born in 2020 (e.g. "Generation Alpha") will experience up to seven times as many extreme weather events over their lifetimes, particularly heat waves, as people born in 1960, under current climate policy pledges. Moreover, on average, voters over 65 played "a leading role in driving up GHG emissions in the past decade and are on the way to becoming the largest contributor" due to factors such as demographic transition, less concern about climate change, and higher use of carbon-intensive products like energy for heating and private transport.

=== Climate change ===
Global warming—the progression from cooler historical temperatures (blue) to recent warmer temperatures (red)—is being experienced disproportionately by younger generations.

Successive generations are predicted to experience progressively greater unprecedented lifetime exposure (ULE) events such as heat waves. About 111 million children born in 2020 will live with unprecedented heatwave exposure in a world that warms by 3.5 °C, compared with 62 million with only 1.5 °C of warming.

In 2015, a group of youth environmental activists filed a lawsuit against the U.S. federal government for insufficiently protecting against climate change in Juliana v. United States. Their statement emphasized the disproportionate cost of climate-related damage younger generations would bear: "Youth Plaintiffs represent the youngest living generation, beneficiaries of the public trust. Youth Plaintiffs have a substantial, direct, and immediate interest in protecting the atmosphere, other vital natural resources, their quality of life, their property interests, and their liberties. They also have an interest in ensuring that the climate system remains stable enough to secure their constitutional rights to life, liberty, and property, rights that depend on a livable Future." In November 2016, the case was allowed to go to trial after US District Court Judge Ann Aiken denied the federal government's motion to dismiss the case. In her opinion and order, she said, "Exercising my 'reasoned judgment,' I have no doubt that the right to a climate system capable of sustaining human life is fundamental to a free and ordered society."

Australian politician Christine Milne made statements in the lead-up to the 2014 Carbon Price Repeal Bill, naming the Liberal National Party (elected to parliament in 2013) and inherently its ministers, as intergenerational thieves; her statement was based on the party's attempts to roll back progressive carbon tax policy and the impact this would have on the intergenerational equity of future generations.

=== Strong vs. weak sustainability ===
A "weak sustainability" perspective argues that intergenerational equity would be achieved if losses to the environment that future generations face were offset by greater gains in economic progress (as measured by contemporary mechanisms/metrics). Some adherents also prioritize the moral concerns about those alive today, putting a discount rate on outcomes for future generations when accounting for generational equity. Others disagree. From the "strong sustainability" perspective, no amount of economic progress (or as measured by contemporary metrics) can justify leaving future generations with a degraded environment. Sharon Beder cautions that the "weak" perspective lacks a knowledge of the future and which intrinsically valuable resources will not be able to be replaced by technology.

== Standards of living usage ==
Discussions of intergenerational equity in standards of living reference differences between people of different ages or of different generations. Two perspectives on intergenerational equity in living standards have been distinguished by Australian sociologist and demographers Rice, Temple, and McDonald. The first perspective – a "cross-sectional" perspective – focuses how living standards at a particular point in time vary between people of different ages. The relevant issue is the degree to which, at a particular point in time, people of different ages enjoy equal living standards. The second perspective – a "cohort" perspective – focuses on how living standards over a lifetime vary between people of different generations. For intergenerational equity, the relevant issue becomes the degree to which people of different generations enjoy equal living standards over their lifetimes.

Three indicators of intergenerational equity in standards of living have been proposed by d'Albis, Badji, El Mekkaoui, and Navaux. Their first indicator originates from a cross-sectional perspective and describes the relative situation of an age group (retirees) with respect to the situation of another age group (younger people). Their second indicator originates from a cohort perspective and compares the living standards of successive generations at the same age. D'Albis, Badji, El Mekkaoui, and Navaux's third indicator is a combination of the two previous criteria and is both an inter-age indicator and an intergenerational indicator. Further indicators of intergenerational equity have been developed by Rice, Temple, McDonald, and Wilson.

In Australia, notable equality has been achieved in living standards, as measured by consumption, among people between the ages of 20 and 75 years. Substantial inequalities exist, however, between different generations, with older generations experiencing lower living standards in real terms at particular ages than younger generations. One way to illustrate these inequalities is to look at how long different generations took to achieve a level of consumption of $30,000 per year (2009–10 Australian dollars). At one extreme, people born in 1935 achieved this level of consumption when they were roughly 50 years of age, on average. At the other extreme, Millennials born in 1995 had achieved this level of consumption by the time they were around 10 years of age.

Considerations such as this have led some scholars to argue that standards of living have tended to increase generation over generation in most countries, as development and technology have progressed. When taking this into account, younger generations may have inherent privileges over older generations, which may offset the redistribution of wealth towards older generations.

=== Housing ===
Housing has become a growing issue of intergenerational equity in the 21st century, especially among younger generations struggling to afford rent or other housing costs. The housing shortage at the root of the affordability crisis took years to create and would take years to reverse by building enough housing. This has led to more pessimism about the future and cynicism of politics and even democracy in younger generations.

=== Health and wellbeing ===
A wide range of health measures, both objective and subjective, can be used to discuss how to prioritize wellbeing across generations. One such measure seeks to help everyone achieve a certain level of health for a 'fair' period of time in their life, even if it means sacrificing some efficiency in the health care system.

==== Elder care ====
Professor Steven Wisensale describes the burden on current working age adults in developed economies, who must care for more elderly parents and relatives for a longer period of time. This problem is exacerbated by the increasing involvement of women in the workforce, and by the dropping fertility rate, leaving the burden for caring for parents, as well as aunts, uncles, and grandparents, on fewer children. In systems with weak social security systems, this also impacts the wellbeing of the elderly who may have fewer caretakers than are optimal.

== See also ==
- Adultism – Discrimination favoring adults over children
- Ageism – Discrimination due to age
- Environmental ethics – Part of environmental philosophy
- Evolving capacities – Child-rights principle recognising children's developing autonomy
- Fear of children – Medical term for the fear of children
- Fear of the elderly – Fear of growing old, or a hatred for or fear of older adults
- Ephebiphobia – Fear of youth
- Generational accounting – Method of measuring the fiscal burdens facing current and future generations
- Generational contract
- Generation Squeeze
- Gerontocracy – Social system with elderly rule
- Golden Rule savings rate – Rate of savings which maximizes steady state level of the growth of consumption
- Intergenerationality – Interaction between members of different generations
- Intergenerational Fairness Day
- intergenerational public procurement
- Justice (economics) – Subcategory of welfare economics
- Longtermism – Philosophical view which prioritises the long-term future
- Overlapping generations model – Framework in macroeconomics
- Transgenerational design – Making products and environments compatible with human aging
- Youth-adult partnerships – Intergenerational collaboration between young people and adults
