= Generation =

All people from about the same time period

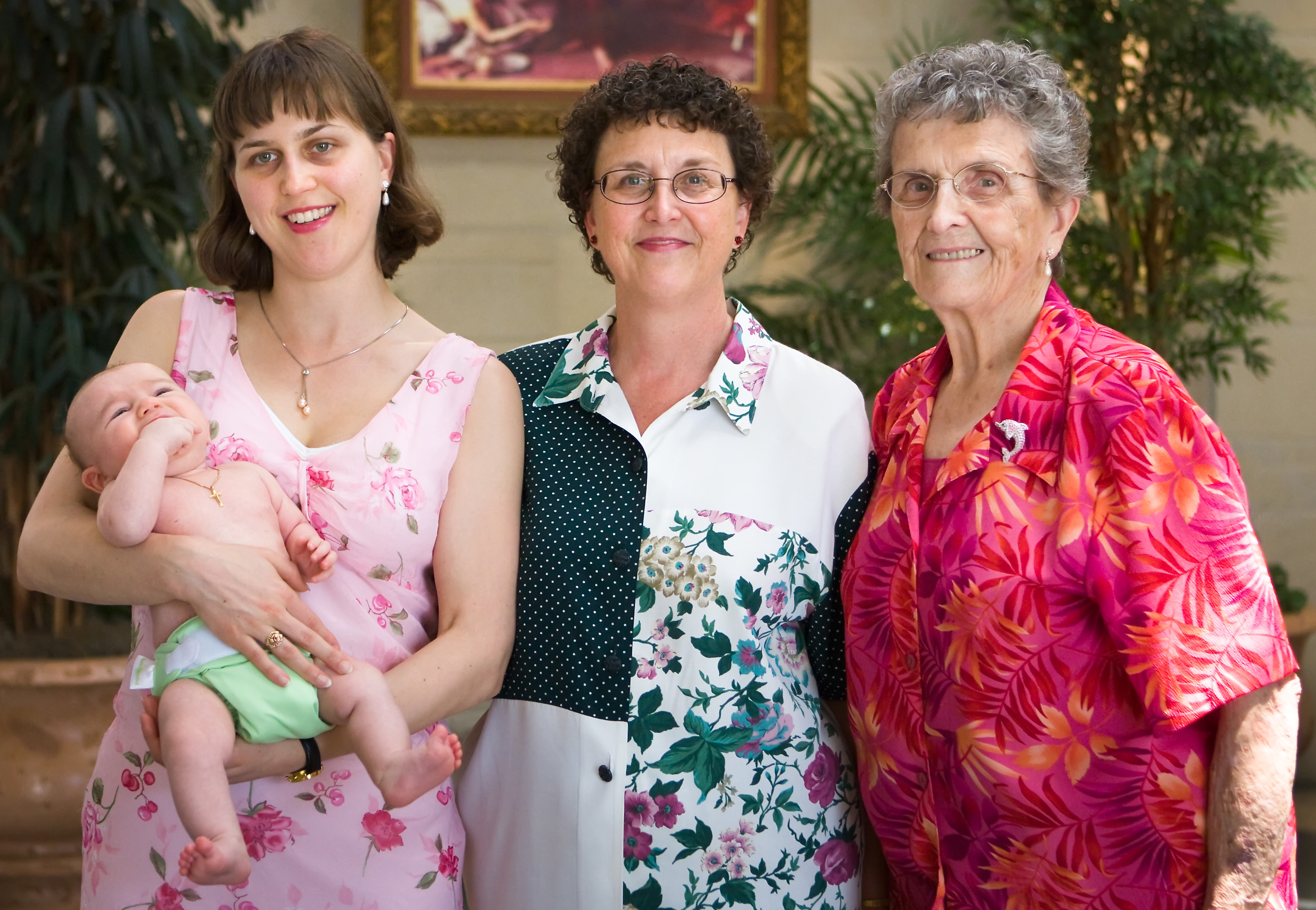
Four generations of one family: a baby boy, his mother, his maternal grandmother, and his maternal great-grandmother. (2008)

A generation is all of the individuals born and living at about the same time, regarded collectively. It also is "the average period, generally considered to be about 20–30 years, during which children are born and grow up, become adults, and begin to have children." In kinship, generation is a structural term, designating the parent–child relationship. In biology, generation also means biogenesis, reproduction, and procreation.

Generation is also a synonym for birth/age cohort in demographics, marketing, and social science, where it means "people within a delineated population who experience the same significant events within a given period of time." The term generation in this sense, also known as social generations, is widely used in popular culture and is a basis of sociological analysis. Serious analysis of generations began in the nineteenth century, emerging from an increasing awareness of the possibility of permanent social change and the idea of youthful rebellion against the established social order. Some analysts believe that a generation is one of the fundamental social categories in a society; others consider generation less important than class, gender, race, and education.

== Etymology ==
The word generate comes from the Latin generāre, meaning "to beget". The word generation as a group or cohort in social science signifies the entire body of individuals born and living at about the same time, most of whom are approximately the same age and have similar ideas, problems, and attitudes (e.g., Beat Generation and Lost Generation).

== Familial generation ==
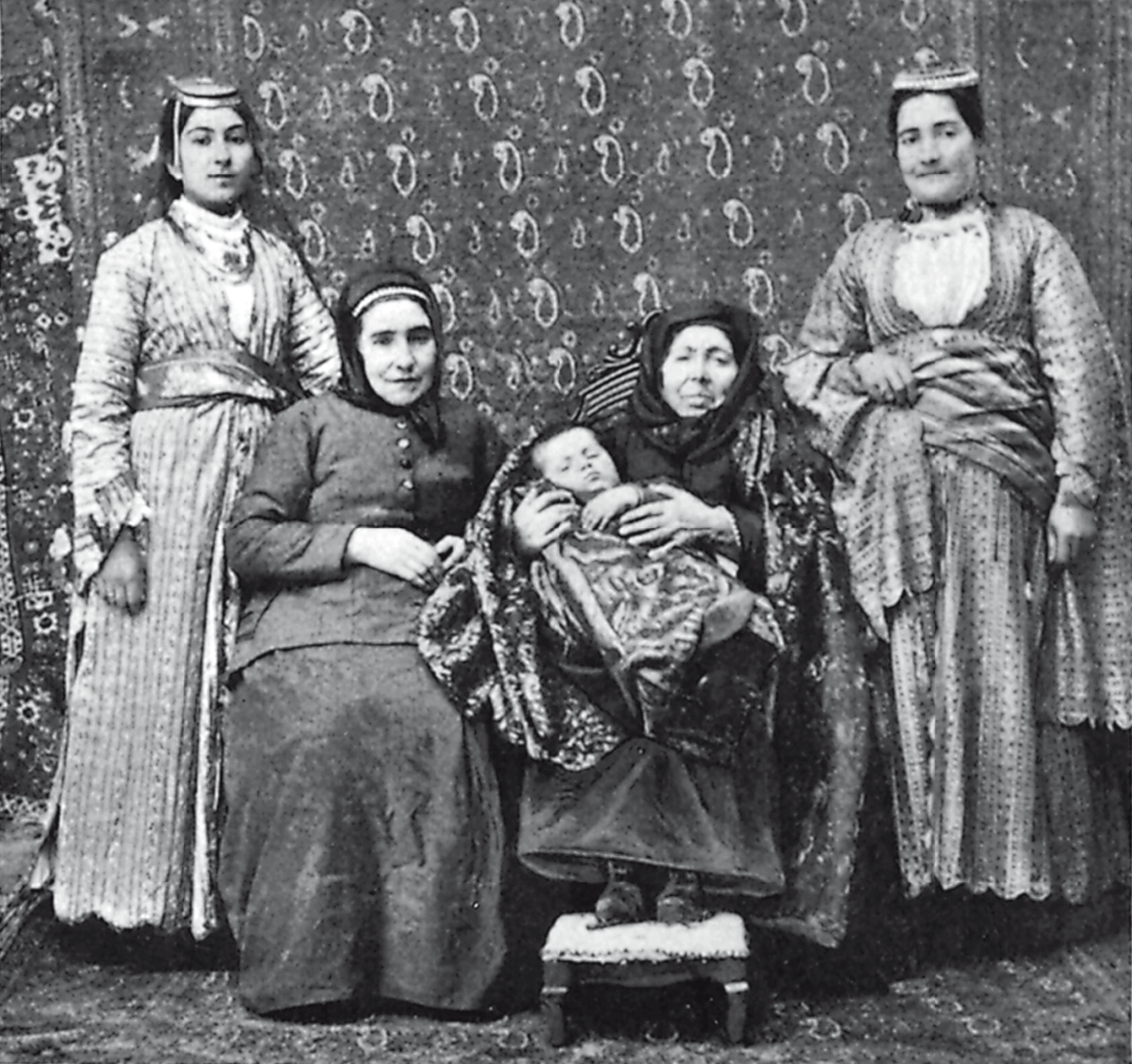
Five generations of one Armenian family—a child with its mother, grandmother, great-grandmother and great-great-grandmother (photograph from book published in 1901)

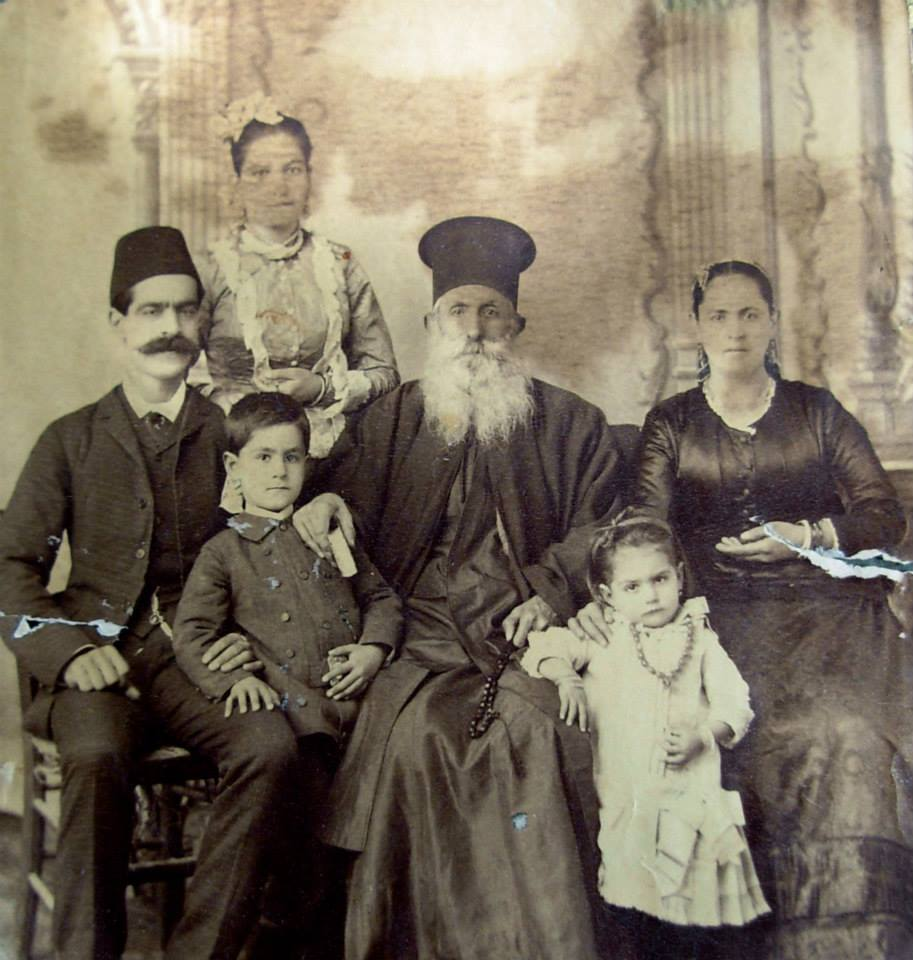
Three generations of an Eastern Orthodox priest family from Jerusalem, c. 1893

A familial generation is a group of living beings constituting a single step in the line of descent from an ancestor. In developed nations the average familial generation length is in the high 20s and has even reached 30 years in some nations. Factors such as greater industrialisation and demand for cheap labour, urbanisation, delayed first pregnancy and a greater uncertainty in both employment income and relationship stability have all contributed to the increase of the generation length from the late 18th century to the present. These changes can be attributed to social factors, such as GDP and state policy, globalization, automation, and related individual-level variables, particularly a woman's educational attainment. Conversely, in less-developed nations, generation length has changed little and remains in the low 20s.

An intergenerational rift in the nuclear family, between the parents and two or more of their children, is one of several possible dynamics of a dysfunctional family. Coalitions in families are subsystems within families with more rigid boundaries and are thought to be a sign of family dysfunction.

== Social generation ==
Social generations are cohorts of people born in the same date range and who share similar cultural experiences. The idea of a social generation has a long history and can be found in ancient literature, but did not gain currency in the sense that it is used today until the 19th century. Prior to that, the concept "generation" had generally referred to family relationships and not broader social groupings. In 1863, the French lexicographer Emile Littré had defined a generation as "all people coexisting in society at any given time."

Several trends promoted a new idea of generations, as the 19th century wore on, of a society divided into different categories of people based on age. These trends were all related to the processes of modernisation, industrialisation, or westernisation, which had been changing the face of Europe since the mid-18th century. One was a change in mentality about time and social change. The increasing prevalence of enlightenment ideas encouraged the idea that society and life were changeable, and that civilization could progress. This encouraged the equation of youth with social renewal and change. Political rhetoric in the 19th century often focused on the renewing power of youth influenced by movements such as Young Italy, Young Germany, Sturm und Drang, the German Youth Movement, and other romantic movements. By the end of the 19th century, European intellectuals were disposed toward thinking of the world in generational terms—in terms of youth rebellion and emancipation.

One important contributing factor to the change in mentality was the change in the economic structure of society. Because of the rapid social and economic change, young men particularly were less beholden to their fathers and family authority than they had been. Greater social and economic mobility allowed them to flout their authority to a much greater extent than had traditionally been possible. Additionally, the skills and wisdom of fathers were often less valuable than they had been due to technological and social change. During this time, the period between childhood and adulthood, usually spent at university or in military service, was also increased for many white-collar workers. This category of people was very influential in spreading the ideas of youthful renewal.

Another important factor was the breakdown of traditional social and regional identifications. The spread of nationalism and many of the factors that created it (a national press, linguistic homogenisation, public education, suppression of local particularities) encouraged a broader sense of belonging beyond local affiliations. People thought of themselves increasingly as part of a society, and this encouraged identification with groups beyond the local. Auguste Comte was the first philosopher to make a serious attempt to systematically study generations. In Cours de philosophie positive, Comte suggested that social change is determined by generational change and in particular conflict between successive generations. As the members of a given generation age, their "instinct of social conservation" becomes stronger, which inevitably and necessarily brings them into conflict with the "normal attribute of youth"—innovation. Other important theorists of the 19th century were John Stuart Mill and Wilhelm Dilthey.

=== Generational theory ===
The sociologist Karl Mannheim was a seminal figure in the study of generations. He elaborated a theory of generations in his 1923 essay The Problem of Generations. He suggested that there had been a division into two primary schools of study of generations until that time. Firstly, positivists such as Comte measured social change in designated life spans. Mannheim argued that this reduced history to "a chronological table". The other school, the "romantic-historical" was represented by Dilthey and Martin Heidegger. This school focused on the individual qualitative experience at the expense of social context. Mannheim emphasised that the rapidity of social change in youth was crucial to the formation of generations, and that not every generation would come to see itself as distinct. In periods of rapid social change a generation would be much more likely to develop a cohesive character. He also believed that a number of distinct sub-generations could exist. According to Gilleard and Higgs, Mannheim identified three commonalities that a generation shares:

- Shared temporal location: generational site or birth cohort
- Shared historical location: generation as actuality or exposure to a common era
- Shared sociocultural location: generational consciousness or entelechy

Mannheim elaborated on the meaning of a generation's "location" (Lagerung), understood in a historical, economic and sociocultural sense. In 1928 he wrote:

The fact that people are born at the same time, or that their youth, adulthood, and old age coincide, does not in itself involve similarity of location; what does create a similar location is that they are in a position to experience the same events and data, etc., and especially that these experiences impinge upon a similarly 'stratified' consciousness. It is not difficult to see why mere chronological contemporaneity cannot of itself produce a common generation location. No one, for example, would assert that there was community of location between the young people of China and Germany about 1800. Only where contemporaries definitely are in a position to participate as an integrated group in certain common experiences can we rightly speak of community of location of a generation.

From Mannheim's perspective, then, the chronological boundaries often attributed to different generations ("Generation X", "Millennials" etc.) seem to have little global validity since these boundaries are mostly based on shared Western, especially American, historical and sociocultural 'locations'.

Authors William Strauss and Neil Howe developed the Strauss–Howe generational theory outlining what they saw as a pattern of generations repeating throughout American history. This theory became quite influential with the public and reignited an interest in the sociology of generations. This led to the creation of an industry of consulting, publishing, and marketing in the field (corporations spent approximately 70 million dollars on generational consulting in the U.S. in 2015). The theory has alternatively been criticized by social scientists and journalists who argue it is non-falsifiable, deterministic, and unsupported by rigorous evidence.

There are psychological and sociological dimensions in the sense of belonging and identity which may define a generation. The concept of a generation can be used to locate particular birth cohorts in specific historical and cultural circumstances, such as the "Baby boomers". Historian Hans Jaeger shows that, during the concept's long history, two schools of thought coalesced regarding how generations form: the "pulse-rate hypothesis" and the "imprint hypothesis." According to the pulse-rate hypothesis, a society's entire population can be divided into a series of non-overlapping cohorts, each of which develops a unique "peer personality" because of the time period in which each cohort came of age. The movement of these cohorts from one life-stage to the next creates a repeating cycle that shapes the history of that society. A prominent example of pulse-rate generational theory is Strauss and Howe's theory. Social scientists tend to reject the pulse-rate hypothesis because, as Jaeger explains, "the concrete results of the theory of the universal pulse rate of history are, of course, very modest. With a few exceptions, the same goes for the partial pulse-rate theories. Since they generally gather data without any knowledge of statistical principles, the authors are often least likely to notice to what extent the jungle of names and numbers which they present lacks any convincing organization according to generations."

Social scientists follow the "imprint hypothesis" of generations (i.e., that major historical events—such as the Vietnam War, the September 11 attacks, the COVID-19 pandemic, etc.—leave an "imprint" on the generation experiencing them at a young age), which can be traced to Karl Mannheim's theory. According to the imprint hypothesis, generations are only produced by specific historical events that cause young people to perceive the world differently than their elders. Thus, not everyone may be part of a generation; only those who share a unique social and biographical experience of an important historical moment will become part of a "generation as an actuality." When following the imprint hypothesis, social scientists face a number of challenges. They cannot accept the labels and chronological boundaries of generations that come from the pulse-rate hypothesis (like Generation X or Millennial); instead, the chronological boundaries of generations must be determined inductively and who is part of the generation must be determined through historical, quantitative, and qualitative analysis.

While all generations have similarities, there are differences among them as well. A 2007 Pew Research Center report called "Millennials: Confident. Connected. Open to Change" noted the challenge of studying generations:

Generational analysis has a long and distinguished place in social science, and we cast our lot with those scholars who believe it is not only possible, but often highly illuminating, to search for the unique and distinctive characteristics of any given age group of Americans. But we also know this is not an exact science. We are mindful that there are as many differences in attitudes, values, behaviors, and lifestyles within a generation as there are between generations. But we believe this reality does not diminish the value of generational analysis; it merely adds to its richness and complexity.

Another element of generational theory is recognizing how youth experience their generation, and how that changes based on where they reside in the world. "Analyzing young people's experiences in place contributes to a deeper understanding of the processes of individualization, inequality, and of generation." Being able to take a closer looks at youth cultures and subcultures in different times and places adds an extra element to understanding the everyday lives of youth. This allows a better understanding of youth and the role generation and place play in their development. It is not where the birth cohort boundaries are drawn that is important, but how individuals and societies interpret the boundaries and how divisions may shape processes and outcomes. However, the practice of categorizing age cohorts is useful to researchers for the purpose of constructing boundaries in their work.

=== Generational tension ===
Norman Ryder writing in American Sociological Review in 1965 shed light on the sociology of the discord between generations by suggesting that society "persists despite the mortality of its individual members, through processes of demographic metabolism and particularly the annual infusion of birth cohorts". He argued that generations may sometimes be a "threat to stability" but at the same time they represent "the opportunity for social transformation".

Amanda Grenier in a 2007 essay published in Journal of Social Issues offered another source of explanation for why generational tensions exist. Grenier asserted that generations develop their own linguistic models that contribute to misunderstanding between age cohorts, "Different ways of speaking exercised by older and younger people exist, and may be partially explained by social historical reference points, culturally determined experiences, and individual interpretations".

Karl Mannheim in his 1952 book Essays on the Sociology of Knowledge asserted the belief that people are shaped through lived experiences as a result of social change. Howe and Strauss also have written on the similarities of people within a generation being attributed to social change. Based on the way these lived experiences shape a generation in regard to values, the result is that the new generation will challenge the older generation's values, resulting in tension. This challenge between generations and the tension that arises is a defining point for understanding generations and what separates them.

The intergenerational policy can be described at either intergenerational altruism, intergenerational equity or intergenerational selfishness. Pay-as-you-go pensions can redistribute between generations. Government debt results in older generations inheriting debt to younger generations.

=== Gerontocracy ===
A gerontocracy is a form of rule in which a political entity is ruled by leaders who are substantially older than most of the population. In many political structures, power within the ruling class accumulates with age, making the oldest individuals the most powerful. Those holding the most power may not be in formal leadership positions, but often dominate those who are. In simple terms, a gerontocracy is a society in which power is reserved for elders. The term was coined in 1828, by Jean-Jacques Fazy, to criticise the French government at the time. The idea of the elderly holding power exists in many cultures, with African gerontocracy having its roots in West Africa, and it is still being practiced by Amedokhian people and many other Esan communities. In Ancient Greece, Plato stated that "it is for the elder man to rule and for the younger to submit". An example of the Ancient Greek gerontocracy can be seen in the city-state of Sparta, which was ruled by the Gerousia, a council made up of members who were at least 60 years old and who served for life.

== List of social generations ==
=== Western world ===
Timeline of generations, with generally used birth years; retirement age and life expectancy are approximate

- The Lost Generation, also known as the "Generation of 1914" in Europe, is a term originating from Gertrude Stein to describe those who fought in World War I. The Lost Generation is defined as the cohort born from 1883 to 1900 who came of age during World War I and the Roaring Twenties.
- The Greatest Generation, also known in American usage as the "G.I. Generation", includes the veterans who fought in World War II. They were born from 1901 to 1927; older G.I.s (or the Interbellum Generation) came of age during the Roaring Twenties, while younger G.I.s came of age during the Great Depression and World War II. Journalist Tom Brokaw wrote about American members of this cohort in his book The Greatest Generation, which popularized the term.
- The Silent Generation, also known as the "Lucky Few", is the cohort who came of age in the post–World War II era. They were born from 1928 to 1945, though some frameworks (such as McCrindle's "Builders") start the cohort in 1925. In the U.S., this group includes most of those who may have fought in the Korean War and many of those who may have fought during the Vietnam War.
- Baby boomers (often shortened to Boomers) are the people born following World War II from 1946 to 1964. Increased birth rates were observed during the post–World War II baby boom, making them a relatively large demographic cohort. In the U.S., many older boomers may have fought in the Vietnam War or participated in the counterculture of the 1960s, while younger boomers (or Generation Jones) came of age in the "malaise" years of the 1970s.
- Generation X (or Gen X for short) is the cohort following the baby boomers. The generation is generally defined as people born between 1965 and 1980, or 1965 and 1979. In the U.S., Xers were sometimes called the "baby bust" generation because of a drop in birth rates following the baby boom. They were also referred to as the MTV Generation, due to the channel's popularity among this cohort.
- Millennials, also known as Generation Y (or Gen Y for short), are the generation following Generation X, who grew up around the turn of the 3rd millennium. The generation is typically defined as people born from 1981 to 1996, or 1980 to 1994. In 2019, millennials outnumbered baby boomers in the United States, amounting to an estimated 71.6 million boomers and 72.1 million millennials.
- Generation Z (or Gen Z for short and colloquially as "Zoomers") are the people succeeding the Millennials. This cohort is generally defined as those born from 1997 to 2012, or 1995 to 2009. Generation Z is named after the last letter of the standard Latin alphabet, following Generation X and Generation Y (also known as the millennials).
- Generation Alpha (or Gen Alpha for short) is the generation succeeding Generation Z. Researchers and popular media loosely identify the early 2010s as the starting birth years and the 2020s as the ending birth years, with there not being a true consensus on the exact birth range yet. Generation Alpha is the first to be born entirely in the 21st century. Generation Alpha is named after the first letter of the Greek alphabet.
- Generation Beta (or Gen Beta for short)

=== Other areas ===
- In Armenia, people born after the country's independence from the Soviet Union in 1991 are known as the "Independence generation".
- In the Czech Republic and Slovakia, the generation of people born in Czechoslovakia during the baby boom which started in the early 1970s, during the period of "normalization" are called "Husák's children". The generation was named after the President and long-term Communist leader of Czechoslovakia, Gustáv Husák. This was due to his political program to boost the growth of population.
- In the People's Republic of China, the "Post-80s" (Chinese: 八零后世代 or 八零后) (born-after-1980 generation) are those who were born in the 1980s in urban areas of mainland China. Growing up in modern China, the Post-80s has been characterised by its optimism for the future, newfound excitement for consumerism and entrepreneurship and acceptance of its historic role in transforming modern China into an economic power. There is also the similarly named "Post-90s" (Chinese: 九零后), those born after 1990. A broader generational classification would be the "one-child generation" born between the introduction of the one-child policy in 1979 and its softening into a "two-child policy" in 2015. The lack of siblings has had profound psychological effects on this generation, such as egoism due to always being at the centre of parents' attention as well as the stress of having to be the sole provider once the parents retire.
- People born post-1980s in Hong Kong are for the most part different from the same generation in mainland China. The term "Post-80s" (zh: 八十後) came into use in Hong Kong between 2009 and 2010, particularly during the opposition to the Guangzhou-Hong Kong Express Rail Link, during which a group of young activists came to the forefront of Hong Kong's political scene. They are said to be "post-materialist" in outlook, and they are particularly vocal in issues such as urban development, culture and heritage, and political reform. Their campaigns include the fight for the preservation of Lee Tung Street, the Star Ferry Pier and the Queen's Pier, Choi Yuen Tsuen Village, real political reform (on 23 June), and a citizen-oriented Kowloon West Art district. Their discourse mainly develops around themes such as anti-colonialism, sustainable development, and democracy.
- In Hungary, the re-criminalization of abortion and the childless-tax policies implemented by Anna Ratkó in the early-1950s resulted in a minor baby boom (roughly 1953–1956) known as the "Ratkó era" (hu:Ratkó-korszak) or the "Ratkó children."
- In India, generations tend to follow a pattern similar to the broad Western model, although there are still major differences, especially in the older generations. One interpretation sees India's independence in 1947 as India's major generational shift. People born in the 1930s and 1940s tended to be loyal to the new state and tended to adhere to "traditional" divisions of society. Indian "boomers", those born after independence and into the early 1960s, witnessed events like the Indian Emergency between 1975 and 1977 which made a number of them somewhat skeptical of the government.
- In Israel, where most Ashkenazi Jews born before the end of World War II were Holocaust survivors, children of survivors and people who survived as babies are sometimes referred to as the "second generation (of Holocaust survivors)" (Hebrew: דור שני לניצולי שואה, dor sheni lenitsolei shoah; or more often just דור שני לשואה, dor sheni lashoah, literally "second generation to the Holocaust"). This term is particularly common in the context of psychological, social, and political implications of the individual and national transgenerational trauma caused by the Holocaust. Some researchers have also found signs of trauma in third-generation Holocaust survivors.
- In Northern Ireland, people born after the signing of the Good Friday Agreement in 1998, generally regarded as the end of the Troubles, are colloquially known as "Peace Babies".
- In Norway, the term "the dessert generation" has been applied to the baby boomers and every generation afterwards.
- In Poland term generation of Columbuses means Poles who were born soon after Poland regained its independence in 1918, and whose adolescence was marked by World War II.
- In Romania, the term decreței (from the Romanian language word decret, meaning "decree"; diminutive decrețel) is used to refer to those Romanians born during the period immediately following Decree 770 signed in 1967, which restricted abortion and contraception, and was intended to create a new and large Romanian population.
- In Russia, characteristics of Russian generations are determined by fateful historical events that significantly change either the foundations of the life of the country as a whole or the rules of life in a certain period of time. Names and given descriptions of Russian generations: the Generation of Winners, the generation of the Cold War, the generation of Perestroika, the first non-Soviet generation (the children of Perestroika, the Witnesses of Perestroika), the digital generation.
- In Singapore, people born before 1949 are referred to as the "Pioneer Generation" for their contributions to Singapore during the nation's earliest years. Likewise, those born between 1950 and 1959 are referred to as the "Merdeka Generation" as their formative years were during the political turbulence of the 1950s to 1960s in Singapore.
- In South Africa, people born after the 1994 general election, the first after apartheid was ended, are often referred to in media as the "born-free generation". People born after the year 2000 are often referred to as "Ama2000", a term popularized by music and a Coca-Cola advert.
- In South Korea, generational cohorts are often defined around the democratization of the country, with various schemes suggested including names such as the "democratization generation", 386 generation (named after Intel 386 computer in the 1990s to describe people in their late 30s and early 40s who were born in the 1960s, and attended university/college in the 1980s, also called the "June 3, 1987 generation"), that witnessed the June uprising, the "April 19 generation" (that struggled against the Syngman Rhee regime in 1960), the "June 3 generation" (that struggled against the normalization treaty with Japan in 1964), the "1969 generation" (that struggled against the constitutional revision allowing three presidential terms), and the shin-se-dae ("new") generation. The term Shin-se-dae generation refers to the generation following Millennials in the Korean language. The Shin-se-dae generation are mostly free from ideological or political bias.
- In Spain, although in general terms there is a certain assimilation to the generational structure of Strauss and Howe (and uncritically the majority of the media use it), there are substantial differentials, for historical reasons that (as established by the Generations theory) have marked the successive age cohorts in the 20th century. Firstly, neutrality during the First World War, which prevented it from suffering that social and cultural impact. Secondly, the Civil War and the subsequent dictatorship, which lasted four decades and, especially during its first decades, imposed strong political, social and cultural repression. And thirdly, neutrality during World War II. Thus, the sociologists Artemio Baigorri and Manuela Caballero insert, between the Silent Generation and the Baby Boom Generation (which they also call the Protest Generation), what they call the Franco Generation (1929–1943), whose childhood and early youth was marked by war, post-war scarcity and repression.
- In Taiwan, the term Strawberry generation refers to Taiwanese people born after 1981 who "bruise easily" like strawberries—meaning they can not withstand social pressure or work hard like their parents' generation; the term refers to people who are insubordinate, spoiled, selfish, arrogant, and sluggish in work.
- In Ukraine, the political scientists Olga Onuch and Henry E. Hale identified people born from about 1975 to 1985 as the "Independence Generation" in their book The Zelensky Effect. This generation were children when Ukraine gained independence in 1991—old enough to recall and understand, but too young to participate—and "came of age politically in an independent Ukraine". Onuch and Hale argue that this generation has played a vital role in the formation of civic national identity in Ukraine.

=== Other terminology ===
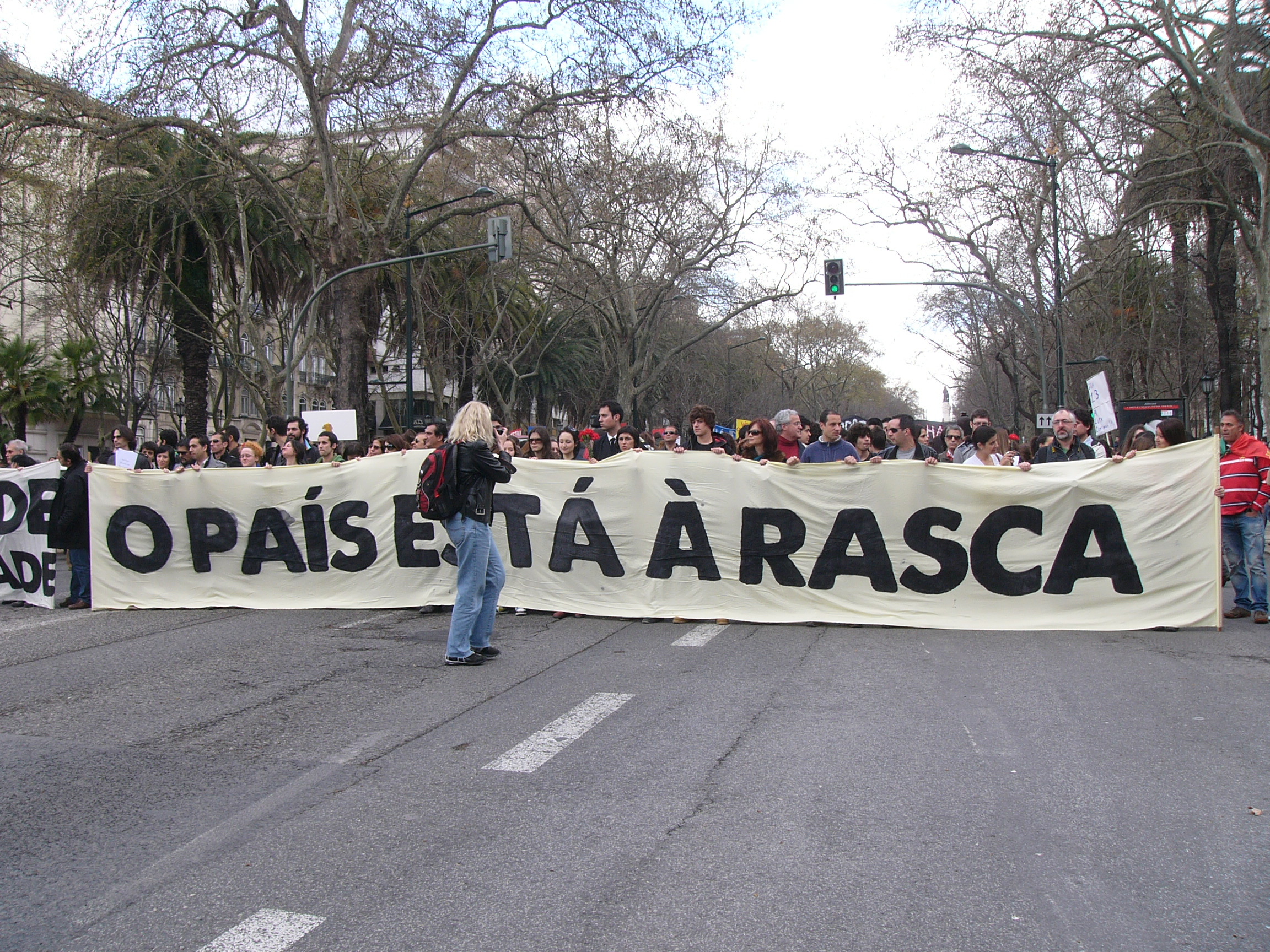
Geração à Rasca demonstration in Lisbon, 2011

The term generation is sometimes applied to a cultural movement, or more narrowly defined group than an entire demographic (such as cuspers between generations). Some examples include:

- The Stolen Generations, refers to children of Aboriginal Australians and Torres Strait Islander descent, who were forcibly removed from their families by Australian federal and state government agencies and church missions, under Acts of their respective parliaments between approximately 1869 and 1969.
- The Beat Generation, refers to a popular American cultural movement widely cited by social scholars as having laid the foundation of the proactive American counterculture of the 1960s. It consisted of Americans born between the two world wars who came of age in the rise of the automobile era, and the surrounding accessibility they brought to the culturally diverse, yet geographically broad and separated nation.
- The Interbellum Generation is a cusp microgeneration considered the older half of the Greatest Generation, born between 1901 and 1914. They were too young to serve in World War I but generally too old to serve in World War II.
- Generation Jones is a term coined by Jonathan Pontell to describe the cohort of people born between 1954 and 1965. The term is used primarily in English-speaking countries. Pontell defined Generation Jones as referring to the second half of the post–World War II baby boom. The term also includes first-wave Generation X.
- MTV Generation, a term referring to the adolescents and young adults of the 1980s and early-mid 1990s who were heavily influenced by the television channel MTV. It is often used synonymously with Generation X.
- In Europe, a variety of terms have emerged in different countries particularly after the 2008 financial crisis to designate young people with limited employment and career prospects.
  - The Generation of 500 is a term popularized by the Greek mass media and refers to educated Greek twixters of urban centers who generally fail to establish a career. Young adults are usually forced into underemployment in temporary and occasional jobs, unrelated to their educational background, and receive the minimum allowable base salary of €500. This generation evolved in circumstances leading to the Greek debt crisis and participated in the 2010–2011 Greek protests.
  - In Spain, they are referred to as the mileuristas (for €1,000, "the thousand-euro-ists").
  - In Portugal, they are called the Geração à Rasca (the "Scraping-By Generation"); a twist on the older term Geração Rasca ("the Lousy Generation") used by detractors to refer to student demonstrations in the 1990s against Education Ministers António Couto dos Santos and later Manuela Ferreira Leite.
  - In France, they are called Génération précaire ("The Precarious Generation").
  - In Italy the term "generation of 1,000 euros" is used.
- Xennials, Oregon Trail Generation, and Generation Catalano are terms used to describe individuals born during Generation X/Millennial cusp years. Xennials is a portmanteau blending the words Generation X and Millennials to describe a microgeneration of people born from the late 1970s to the early 1980s.
- Zillennials, Zennials, Snapchat Generation, and MinionZ are terms used to describe individuals born during the Millennial/Generation Z cusp years. Zillennials is a portmanteau blending the words Millennials and Generation Z to describe a microgeneration of people born from the mid- to late-1990s.
- In the Netherlands the term Pechgeneratie ("Bad luck generation") describes students who started their higher education between the years of 2015 and 2022. In those years, the Dutch government had replaced the basic grant (basisbeurs) system with a loan system in which students had to take on debt to pay for their studies.

== Criticism ==
Philip N. Cohen, a sociology professor at the University of Maryland, criticized the use of "generation labels", stating that the labels are "imposed by survey researchers, journalists or marketing firms" and "drive people toward stereotyping and rash character judgment." Cohen's open letter to the Pew Research Center, which outlines his criticism of generational labels, received at least 150 signatures from other demographers and social scientists.

Louis Menand, writer at The New Yorker, stated that "there is no empirical basis" for the contention "that differences within a generation are smaller than differences between generations." He argued that generational theories "seem to require" that people born at the tail end of one generation and people born at the beginning of another (e.g. a person born in 1965, the first year of Generation X, and a person born in 1964, the last of the Boomer era) "must have different values, tastes, and life experiences" or that people born in the first and last birth years of a generation (e.g. a person born in 1980, the last year of Generation X, and a person born in 1965, the first year of Generation X) "have more in common" than with people born a couple years before or after them.

In 2023, after a review of their research and methods, and consulting with external experts, Pew Research Center announced a change in their use of generation labels to "avoid reinforcing harmful stereotypes or oversimplifying people's complex lived experiences", and said that, going forward, they will only conduct generational analysis when historical data is available that allows them to "compare generations at similar stage of life" and "won't always default to using the standard generational definitions and labels."

== See also ==
- Ageism – Discrimination due to age
- Age set – Social category or corporate social group
- Cusper – Person born near the border separating two generations
- Filial responsibility laws – Criminalization of not financially supporting one's impoverished parents or relatives
- Generation gap – Difference of opinions between generations
- Generation time – Average time from one generation to another within the same population
- Generational accounting – Method of measuring the fiscal burdens facing current and future generations
- Generationism – Age-related belief
- Intergenerationality – Interaction between members of different generations
- Overlapping generations model – Framework in macroeconomics
- Transgenerational design – Making products and environments compatible with human aging
