= I need ammunition, not a ride =

2022 quote by Volodymyr Zelenskyy

"I need ammunition, not a ride" is a quote by Ukrainian president Volodymyr Zelenskyy, spoken when he refused international offers to evacuate him from Kyiv at the start of the 2022 Russian invasion of Ukraine.

The quote has also been rendered in English as "I need weapons, not a taxi" (Ukrainian: «мені потрібна зброя, а не таксі», romanized: "meni potribna zbroya, a ne taksi").

== Background ==
On 24 February 2022, eight years after Russia started the Russo-Ukrainian war by annexing Crimea and invading Ukraine's Donbas region, Russia began a full-scale invasion and launched an offensive on Kyiv, the capital of Ukraine. As Russian forces attempted to occupy Kyiv, Wagner Group mercenaries and Chechen special forces repeatedly tried to capture or kill President Volodymyr Zelenskyy to decapitate the Ukrainian government.

The Washington Post reported on 25 February that the US was prepared to help Zelenskyy escape from Kyiv as Russian forces advanced, but that he had not agreed to go. Multiple European leaders also offered to evacuate Zelenskyy and his family. Disinformation began to spread that Zelenskyy had left Kyiv. On the night of 25 February, Zelenskyy posted a selfie video on social media of himself surrounded by his advisors near the presidential compound, showing that they were in Kyiv and declaring "We are all here".

At 4.04 am on 26 February 2022 (UTC), the Associated Press (AP) reported in its live updates about the invasion that Zelenskyy had been asked to evacuate Kyiv by the US government but had declined the offer, and quoted him as having said:

The fight is here; I need ammunition, not a ride.

AP was the first to report the quote, and cited "a senior American intelligence official with direct knowledge of the conversation, who described Zelenskyy as upbeat".

At 7.53 am (UTC), AP published a second article saying:

The official quoted the president as saying that "the fight is here" and that he needed anti-tank ammunition but "not a ride."

This version was also reported by media such as The Times of Israel, The Guardian, PBS, and The Times.

At 9.37 am (UTC), the Embassy of Ukraine in the United Kingdom posted the quote in full sentence form on its official Twitter account with the comment "Ukrainians are proud of their president". Media such as CNN and The New York Times reported the quote citing the embassy.

== Responses ==
The Washington Post has called this quote "one of the most-cited lines" of the war, quoted in "hundreds of news articles". The New York Times wrote on 27 February 2022 that the quote would "most likely go down in Ukrainian history whether [Zelenskyy] survives this onslaught or not". Voice of America said the quote had "become an emblem of the Ukrainian people's fierce resistance to invading Russian troops". The BBC called the quote "iconic". Olga Onuch and Henry E. Hale called the quote "now-legendary" in their 2022 book The Zelensky Effect.

=== Verification ===
Some doubts were raised about whether Zelenskyy said this sentence, and attempts have been made to verify the quote. James LaPorta, the journalist who first reported the quote for the Associated Press (AP), later wrote in CBS News that AP's top editors had met to discuss whether the story could be published based on LaPorta's single source, and that executive editor Julie Pace had decided to proceed because the source was "a senior US intelligence official with direct knowledge of the conversation".

Glenn Kessler wrote in The Washington Post's "Fact Checker" feature in March 2022 that neither the US government nor Zelenskyy's office had confirmed the quote, and that although Zelenskyy himself would be able to confirm it, he was "rather busy". Kessler wrote that Biden administration officials "expressed confusion" about the report and denied that they had asked Zelenskyy to leave Kyiv. In response, LaPorta told the "Fact Checker": "I can understand why they have been denying it. It makes them look bad." Zelenskyy's press secretary Serhii Nykyforov told the "Fact Checker" that he had not heard the quote himself and could not confirm the conversation; he said it might have been a private conversation he was not privy to, and that even if those were not Zelenskyy's exact words, they reflected his actions.

Kessler also wrote that the Embassy of Ukraine in the United Kingdom, which tweeted the quote hours after AP's initial report, had not clarified whether it had confirmed the quote independently or had based its tweet on AP's article. The authors of The Zelensky Effect wrote that then-ambassador Vadym Prystaiko was "a key member of Zelenskyy's team" who "would have been in a good position to obtain an accurate quotation".

In February 2023, journalist Dmytro Komarov asked Zelenskyy about the quote while interviewing him for the Year documentary series about the first year of the full-scale war. Komarov asked, "Returning to this legendary phrase about [not needing] a taxi and [needing] weapons. Where exactly was it said? To whom? Do you remember?" Zelenskyy said "It was said to President Biden", who Zelenskyy said had brought up the topic of escape, but he had refused "because I know what the capital of any state is. If the capital fell and the leader fled, there is no state."

On 24 February 2026, Zelenskyy recorded a video address for the fourth anniversary of the full-scale invasion. He referred to the quote while showing the interior of the government bunker where he and other officials had lived and worked in the early phase of the war: "Here I spoke with President Biden, and it was right here that I heard: Volodymyr, there is a threat. You need to leave Ukraine urgently. We are ready to help with that. And here I replied that I need ammunition, not a ride."

In May 2026, LaPorta wrote in CBS News that the Biden administration's National Security Council, including then–US National Security Advisor Jake Sullivan, had repeatedly contacted AP after the initial report to angrily deny the quote and demand a retraction. LaPorta wrote that he had rechecked the facts multiple times in response to the pushback, and maintained that the story and the quote were "verbatim accurate in the English translation". He called Zelenskyy's fourth-anniversary speech the first time Zelenskyy had confirmed the quote, and added that both he and AP continued to stand by the original story, as did a spokesperson for Zelenskyy.

In October 2026, Zelenskyy recounted the start of the full-scale invasion again on the podcast The Diary of a CEO. He said that Biden had been the first to offer to evacuate him, followed by European leaders. Asked what he had said to Biden, Zelenskyy repeated this quote. He said that he had stayed visible to the public to counter Russian disinformation that he had fled, and that he could not have abandoned Kyiv or Ukrainians because that would have been "betrayal of [his] human decency and the constitution of Ukraine".

== See also ==
- Russian warship, go fuck yourself
- Without you (post)
- Speeches by Volodymyr Zelenskyy during the Russian invasion of Ukraine
