= Bradley Kasal =

United States Marine (born 1966)

Bradley Allan Kasal
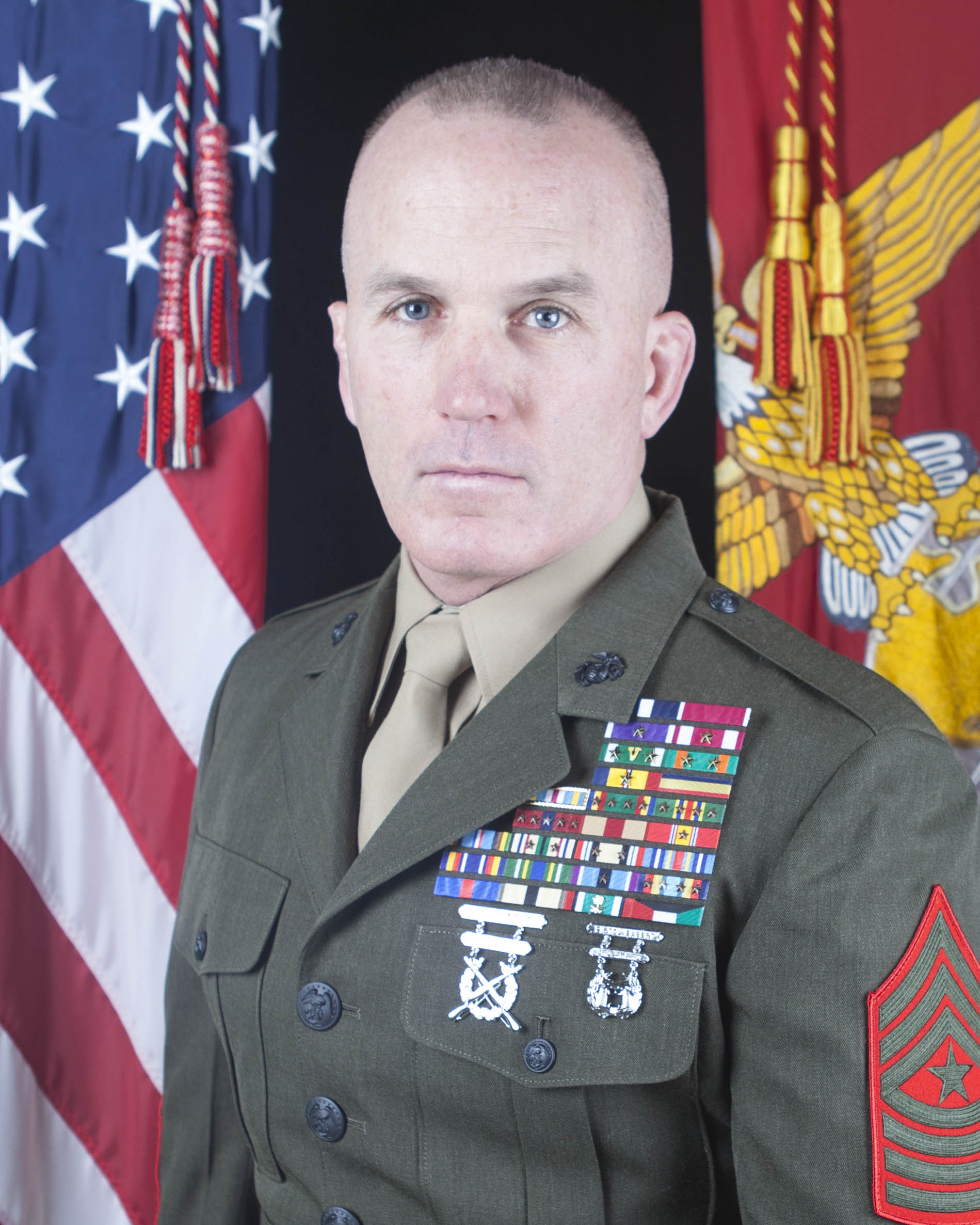
- Kasal in 2015
- Born: May 1, 1966 (age 60); Marengo, Iowa, U.S.
- Military career
- Allegiance: United States
- Branch: United States Marine Corps
- Service years: 1984–2018
- Rank: Sergeant major
- Units: 3rd Battalion 1st Marines; 1st Marine Division; I Marine Expeditionary Force
- Conflicts: Gulf War; Operation Desert Storm; Iraq War; Second Battle of Fallujah (WIA)
- Awards: Navy Cross; Legion of Merit (2); Purple Heart (2); Meritorious Service Medal (2); Navy and Marine Corps Commendation Medal (3); Navy and Marine Corps Achievement Medal (3)

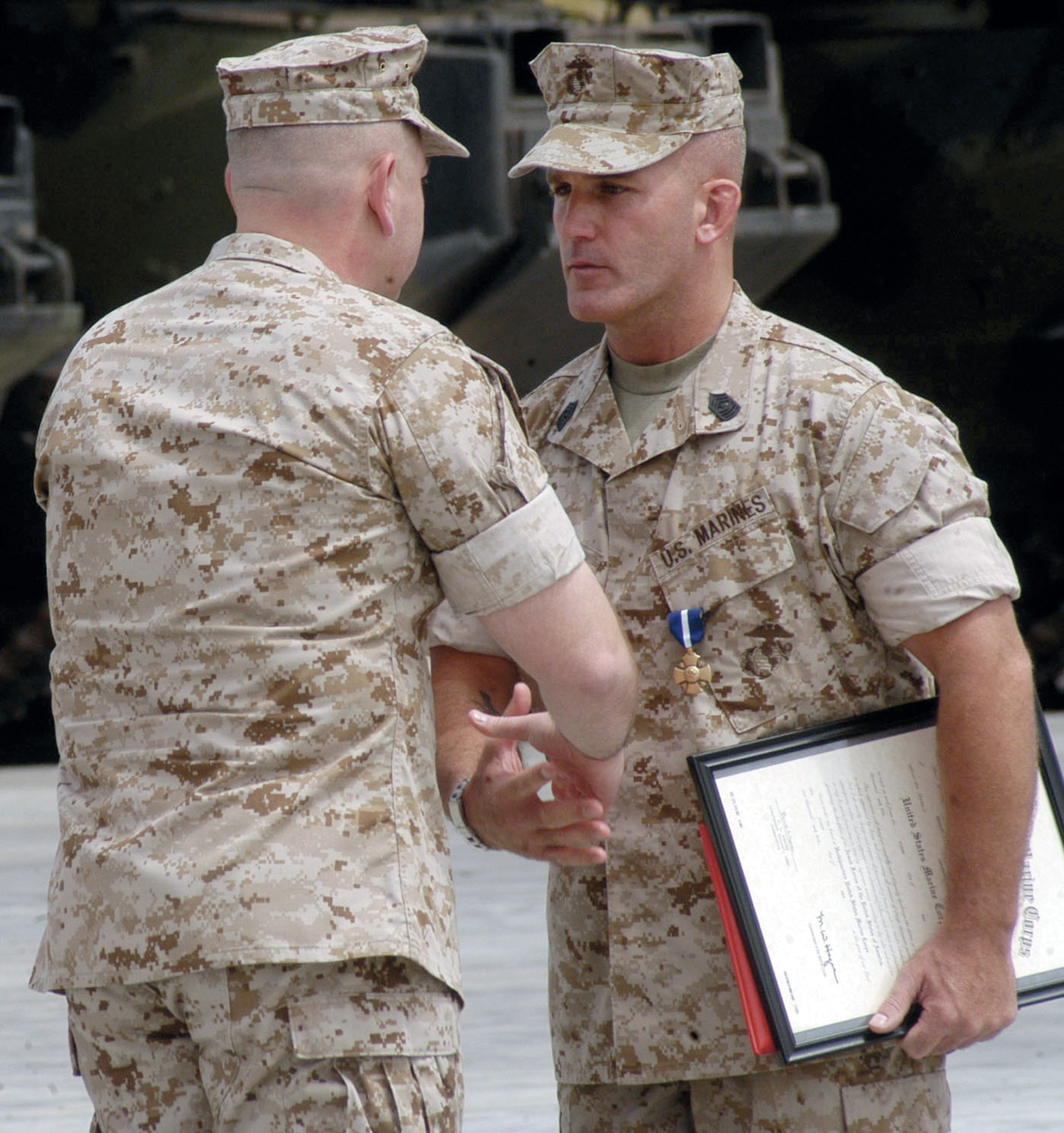
Kasal being awarded the Navy Cross and promoted to sergeant major in May 2006

Bradley Allan Kasal (born May 1, 1966) is a United States Marine who received the Navy Cross for heroic actions performed as the first sergeant of Weapons Company, 3rd Battalion, 1st Marines during a firefight in Operation Phantom Fury in Fallujah, Iraq on November 13, 2004. He received the decoration in May 2006 during a ceremony at Camp Pendleton, followed by his promotion to sergeant major and reenlistment in the U.S. Marine Corps. He retired in 2018 after nearly thirty-four years of service.

== Career ==
=== Iraq War ===
==== Actions in Iraq ====
In a firefight with insurgents in a house in Fallujah, although wounded by seven 7.62×39mm rounds in the legs and hit by more than 43 pieces of hot fragmentation from a grenade while using his body to shield an injured fellow Marine, PFC Alex Nicoll (who was also injured in the legs), First Sergeant Kasal refused to quit fighting and was able to return fire with his M9 pistol, killing at least one insurgent. Kasal is credited with saving the lives of several Marines during the U.S. assault on insurgent strongholds in Fallujah in November 2004.

By the time he was carried out of the house by LCpls Chris Marquez and Dane Shaffer, Kasal had lost approximately 60 percent of his blood. A photograph that was taken by photographer Lucian Read of a bloodied Kasal (who continued to maintain control, including trigger and muzzle discipline, of his M9 pistol and his KA-BAR fighting knife despite the extent of his injuries) being helped from the building by Marquez and Shaffer has become one of the iconic pictures of the war. A bronze statue of Marquez and Shaffer helping Kasal to safety, titled No Man Left Behind and based on Read's photograph, was installed outside the Wounded Warrior Battalion West site at Camp Pendleton in November 2014.

==== Recovery ====
Due to the injuries, Kasal lost four inches of bone in his right leg. He has undergone 21 surgeries to date in order to repair his injuries and save his leg. Kasal continues his recovery from his wounds and still walks with a limp.

Kasal served as the Sergeant Major of Recruiting Station Des Moines, Iowa from May 2006 until January 2010. He then returned to Camp Pendleton to serve as the Sergeant Major at the School of Infantry West In March 2010, Kasal was featured in the debut episode of Sharing the Courage, a graphic novel series depicting decorated Marines of the 21st century. On November 15, 2012, the book My Men are My Heroes: The Brad Kasal Story by Nathaniel Helms, was released; it was published by the Naval Institute Press. He became sergeant major of the 4th Marine Division in March 2013 and then became sergeant major of the I Marine Expeditionary Force in February 2015.

==== After retirement ====
Kasal retired in 2018, after 34 years with the United States Marine Corps. After the USMC, Kasal started teaching at high schools through the MCJROTC program. He continued to teach about discipline, honor, respect, and courage through his experiences in the Marine Corps. Up until and including the 2024-25 school year, he was the Marine Instructor at Basic Academy of International Studies, in Henderson, Nevada, along with Senior Marine Instructor Lieutenant Colonel Bradley Van Slyke.

In 2026, James LaPorta reported that Kasal was under a federal criminal investigation stemming from sealed allegations relating to his teaching in the MCJROTC program.

== Navy Cross citation ==
The President of the United States
Takes Pleasure in Presenting The Navy Cross To

Bradley A. Kasal
First Sergeant, United States Marine Corps

For Services as Set Forth in the Following Citation:

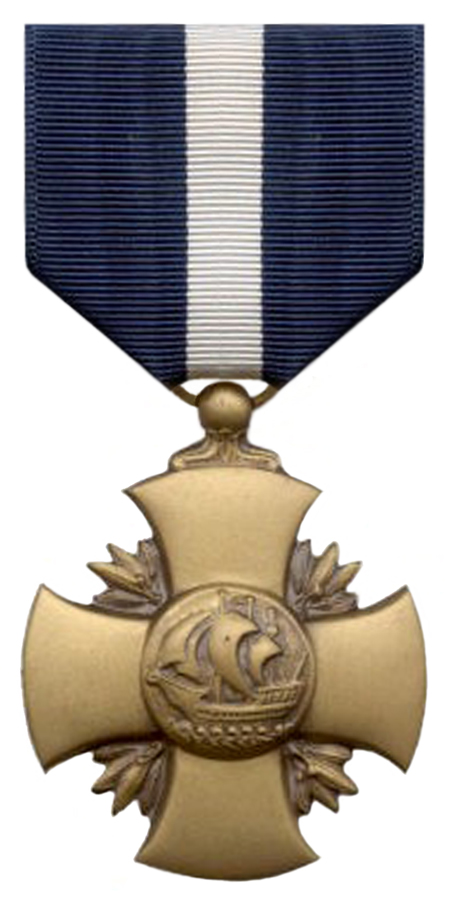

For extraordinary heroism while serving as First Sergeant, Weapons Company, 3d Battalion, 1st Marine Regiment, Regimental Combat Team 1, 1st Marine Division, I Marine Expeditionary Force, U.S. Marine Corps Forces Central Command in support of Operation IRAQI FREEDOM on 13 November 2004. First Sergeant Kasal was assisting 1st Section, Combined Anti-Armor Platoon as they provided a traveling over watch for 3d Platoon when he heard a large volume of fire erupt to his immediate front, shortly followed by Marines rapidly exiting a structure. When First Sergeant Kasal learned that Marines were pinned down inside the house by an unknown number of enemy personnel, he joined a squad making entry to clear the structure and rescue the Marines inside. He made entry into the first room, immediately encountering and eliminating an enemy insurgent, as he spotted a wounded Marine in the next room. While moving towards the wounded Marine, First Sergeant Kasal and another Marine came under heavy rifle fire from an elevated enemy firing position and were both severely wounded in the legs, immobilizing them. When insurgents threw grenades in an attempt to eliminate the wounded Marines, he rolled on top of his fellow Marine and absorbed the shrapnel with his own body. When First Sergeant Kasal was offered medical attention and extraction, he refused until the other Marines were given medical attention. Although severely wounded himself, he shouted encouragement to his fellow Marines as they continued to clear the structure. By his bold leadership, wise judgment, and complete dedication to duty, First Sergeant Kasal reflected great credit upon himself and upheld the highest traditions of the Marine Corps and the United States Naval Service.
