= Speeches by Volodymyr Zelenskyy during the Russian invasion of Ukraine =

Speeches by Ukrainian President since 2022

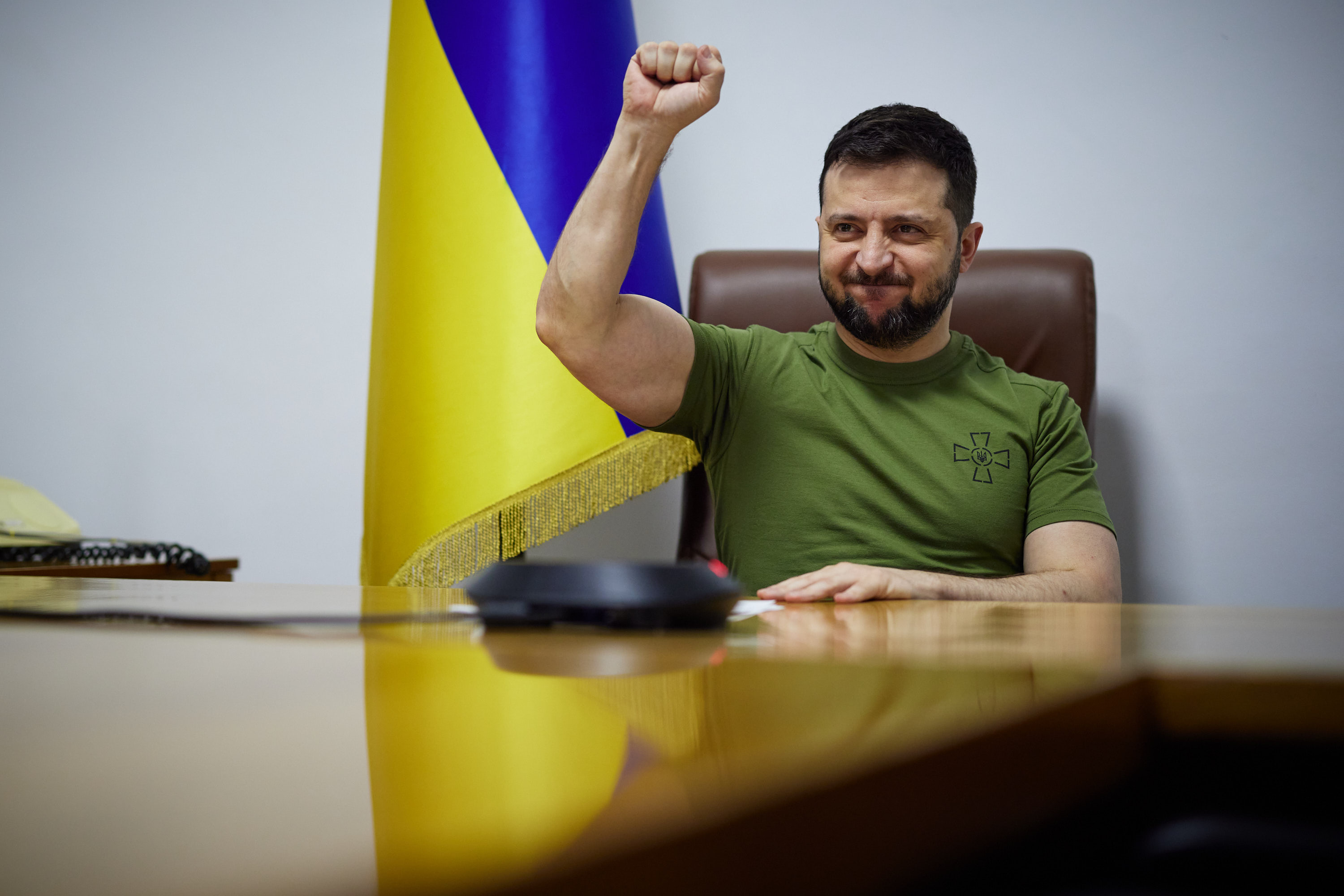
Zelenskyy addressing the Lithuanian Parliament on 12 April 2022

Since 24 February 2022, when Russia launched a full-scale invasion of Ukraine and began the current phase of the Russo-Ukrainian war, Ukrainian President Volodymyr Zelenskyy has made a number of speeches in multiple formats, including on social media and to foreign legislatures. The speeches have received significant attention, with a number of commentators citing a positive effect on Ukrainian morale and on international support for Ukrainian resistance to the invasion.

== Social media videos ==
Soon after the invasion started, Zelenskyy posted a video speech of him declaring martial law.

On 25 February, the second day of the invasion, concerns were initially raised about his whereabouts after he missed a scheduled phone call with Italian Prime Minister Mario Draghi. Later that day, he posted a video of him flanked by several advisors in front of Mariinskyi Palace in central Kyiv. In the video, he said "Our army is here, our civil society is here, we are all here," and "We are defending our independence, our state, and we will continue to do so." Later that day, he posted another video of a short speech addressing the ongoing Russian assault on Kyiv, urging Kyiv residents to fight back "any way you can." On 24 February, Zelenskyy had teleconferenced with European Union leaders.

On 26 February, he posted a short speech warning against disinformation that he had fled Kyiv, saying, "I am here. We are not putting down arms. We will be defending our country, because our weapon is truth, and our truth is that this is our land, our country, our children, and we will defend all of this."

== Addresses to foreign legislatures ==
Parliaments addressed by Zelenskyy during the invasion

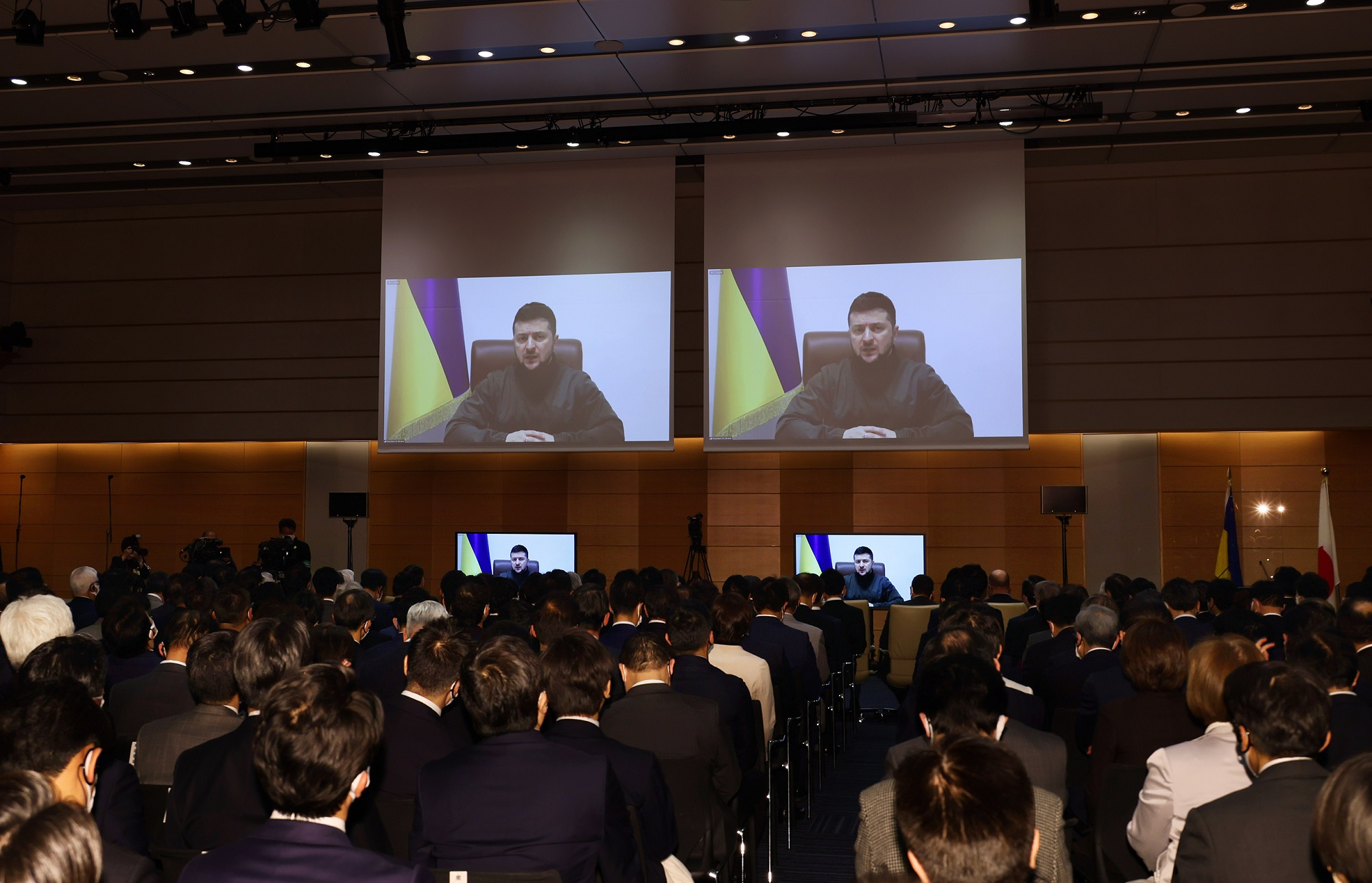
To the Japanese National Diet, received with a standing ovation

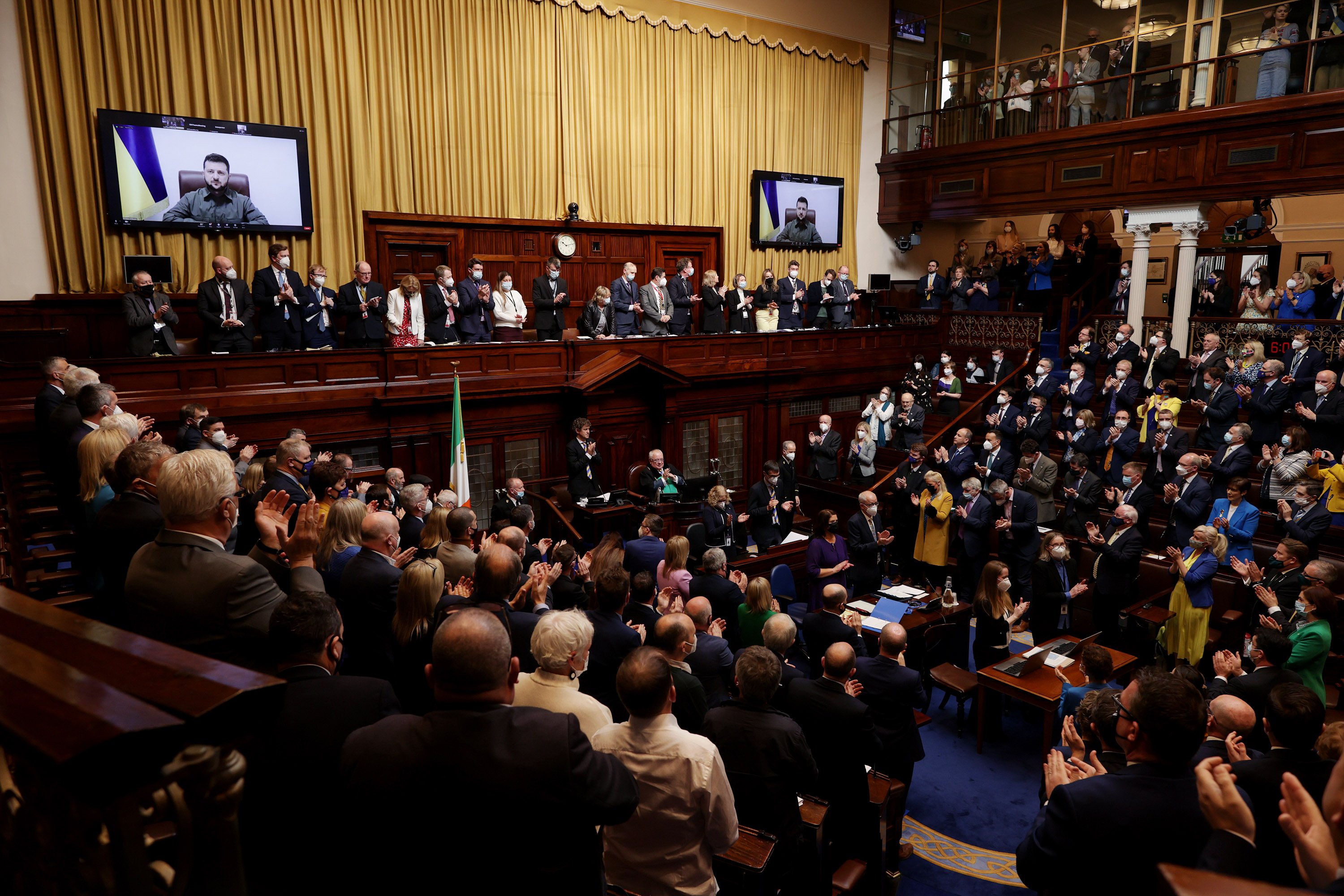
At a joint sitting of Ireland's Dáil & Seanad Éireann

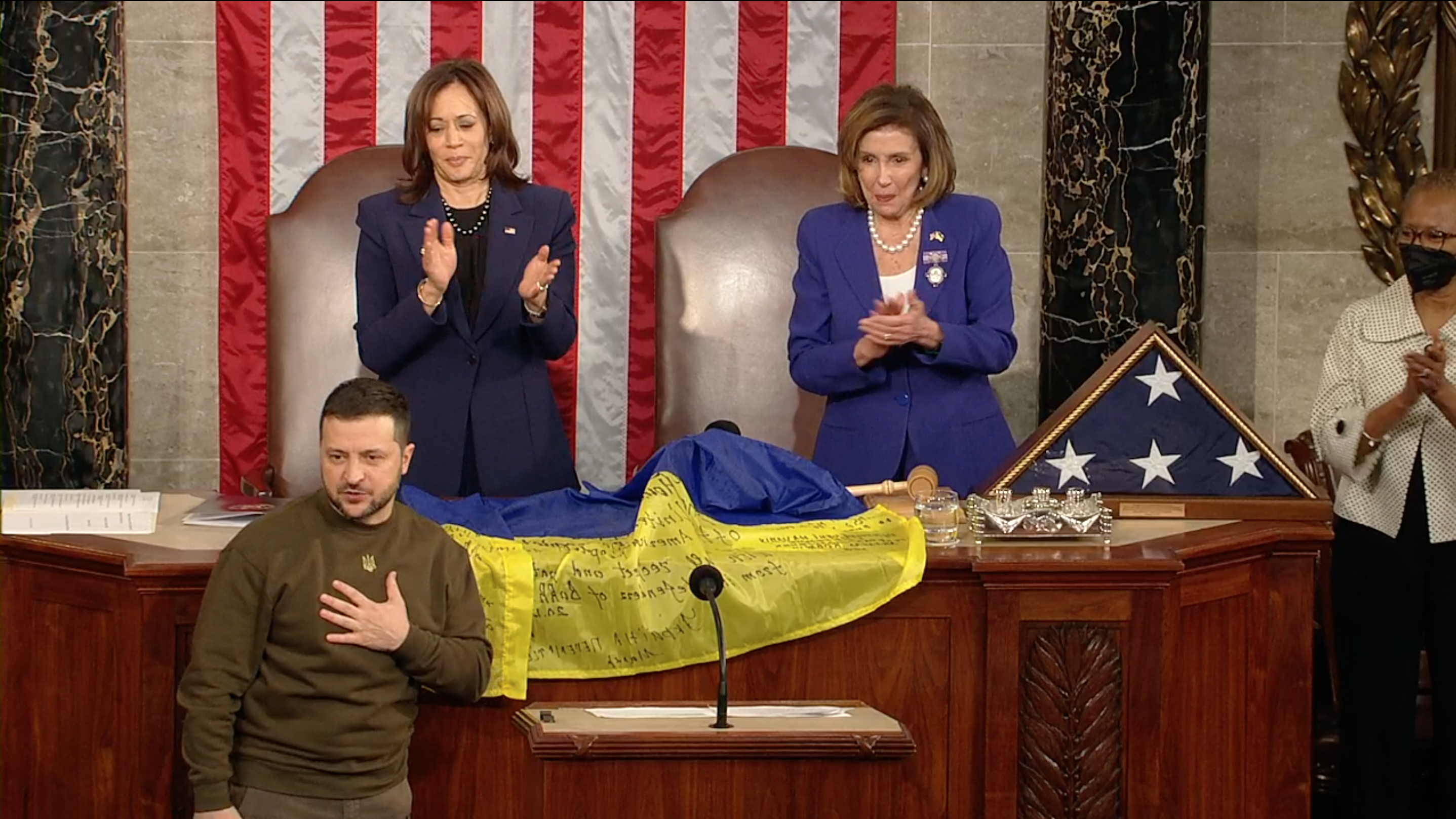
Volodymyr Zelenskyy during his speech to Congress

Since March 2022, Zelenskyy has made a series of virtual and in-person speeches to the legislatures of other nations regarding the invasion.

Date	Parliament	In person	Online	Notes
1 March 2022	European Parliament		Checked	
8 March 2022	House of Commons of the British Parliament		Checked	Thirteen days of struggle.
11 March 2022	Sejm of Poland		Checked	
15 March 2022	Parliament of Canada		Checked	The third Ukrainian president to give an address to the Canadian Parliament after Petro Poroshenko in 2014 and Victor Yushchenko in 2008. After the speech, the speakers of the House of Commons and the Senate, as well as the leaders of the political parties represented in the House of Commons made statements on the speech, all expressing support for Zelenskyy.
16 March 2022	United States Congress		Checked	Following the speech, American President Joe Biden stated that the US would provide Ukraine with an extra $800 million in military aid and stated that he considered Putin "a war criminal", the first time Biden formally accused the Russian government of war crimes in the invasion.
17 March 2022	Bundestag		Checked	In the speech, he stated that Germany had attempted to appease Russia in the 2010s, notably through business deals such as Nord Stream 2, and that it had failed its post-Holocaust historical responsibility. He also invoked the Berlin Wall, stating that there was a new wall "in the middle of Europe between freedom and a lack thereof. And this wall is getting taller with every bomb that falls on Ukraine." However, the German Parliament did not schedule time to debate the speech after its conclusion on its agenda for the day.
20 March 2022	Israeli Knesset		Checked	
22 March 2022	Italian parliament		Checked	
23 March 2022	National Diet of Japan		Checked	
23 March 2022	National Assembly of France		Checked	
24 March 2022	Swedish Riksdag		Checked	
29 March 2022	Danish Folketing		Checked	
30 March 2022	Norwegian Storting		Checked	
31 March 2022	House of Representatives of the Netherlands		Checked	He requested to stop trading with Russia including a boycott on Russian gas and requested for more weapons. Almost all members of parliament praised Zelenskyy's speech, calling it "impressive" and "a historic moment". | That same day, he also addressed the Parliament of Australia, requesting Bushmaster Protected Mobility Vehicles and other weapons, as well as the Parliament of Belgium.
4 April 2022	Parliament of Romania		Checked	
5 April 2022	Cortes Generales of Spain		Checked	
6 April 2022	Oireachtas, Parliament of Ireland		Checked	
7 April 2022	House of Representatives of Cyprus		Checked	
7 April 2022	Parliament of Greece		Checked	
8 April 2022	Parliament of Finland		Checked	
11 April 2022	National Assembly of the Republic of Korea		Checked	
12 April 2022	Parliament of Lithuania		Checked	
13 April 2022	Riigikogu of Estonia		Checked	
21 April 2022	Parliament of Portugal		Checked	
3 May 2022	Parliament of Albania		Checked	
6 May 2022	Althing of Iceland		Checked	
10 May 2022	National Council of Slovakia		Checked	
10 May 2022	Parliament of Malta		Checked	
26 May 2022	Saeima of Latvia		Checked	
2 June 2022	Chamber of Deputies of Luxembourg		Checked	
15 June 2022	Parliament of the Czech Republic		Checked	
8 July 2022	Parliament of Slovenia		Checked	
14 December 2022	Parliament of New Zealand		Checked	
21 December 2022	United States Congress	Checked		A joint session of Congress in-person. It was his first foreign visit since the Russian invasion.
8 February 2023	Parliament of the United Kingdom	Checked		A joint session.
9 February 2023	European Parliament	Checked		
30 March 2023	Austrian Parliament		Checked	
4 April 2023	National Congress of Chile		Checked	
4 May 2023	House of Representatives of the Netherlands	Checked		
15 June 2023	Federal Assembly of Switzerland		Checked	
21 August 2023	Danish Parliament	Checked		Denmark announced it would donate 19 F-16 fighter jets to Ukraine.
7 June 2024	National Assembly of France	Checked		France announced it would donate Mirage 2000 fighter jets to Ukraine.
11 June 2024	Bundestag	Checked		

== Other ==
On 24 March 2022, he addressed the NATO Summit.

On 3 April, he appeared at the 64th Annual Grammy Awards in a pre-taped speech.

On 21 April, he made an address at the World Bank ministerial roundtable in support of Ukraine.

He went on to give video addresses at World Economic Forum, Venice Film Festival, Forum 2000, Ambrosetti Forum, and Bled Strategic Forum.

On 3 August, Zelenskyy addressed Australian universities at a session hosted by the Australian National University.

=== Media interviews ===
Media interviews by Zelenskyy during the invasion
1 March	(United States) CNN, (United Kingdom) Reuters
7 March	(United States) ABC News
10 March	(United States) Vice News
21 March	(European Union) European Broadcasting Union
25 March	(United Kingdom) The Economist
1 April	(United States) Fox News
5 April	(Turkey) Habertürk TV
7 April	(India) Republic TV
10 April	(United States) CBS, (United States) Associated Press
11 April	(Qatar) Al Jazeera English, (Germany) Bild
14 April	(United Kingdom) BBC
15 April	(United States) The Atlantic
18 April	(United States) CNN
Purple represents interpreter

On 1 March 2022, CNN and Reuters journalists were taken in a van to a "non-descript, Soviet-era administrative office" in Kyiv. There were fully armed soldiers everywhere. Sandbags were visible and Ukrainian symbols were moved closer. Zelenskyy appeared, welcoming the journalists positively with handshakes. In the interview he called on the President of the United States Joe Biden to address the situation, and commented that it was yet to be seen whether talks were a waste of time. Ukraine's resistance was spoken of triumphantly and the advantage of fighting on their home ground.

In the backdrop of failed talks, Zelenskyy told Vice on 10 March 2022 that dialogue with Putin was the only way forward and he was positive talks would eventually work. Two days before he had said in an interview with ABC News that he would no longer seek out NATO membership, that he would consider a "compromise" in related to Donetsk and Luhansk, and also addressed the people of America directly.

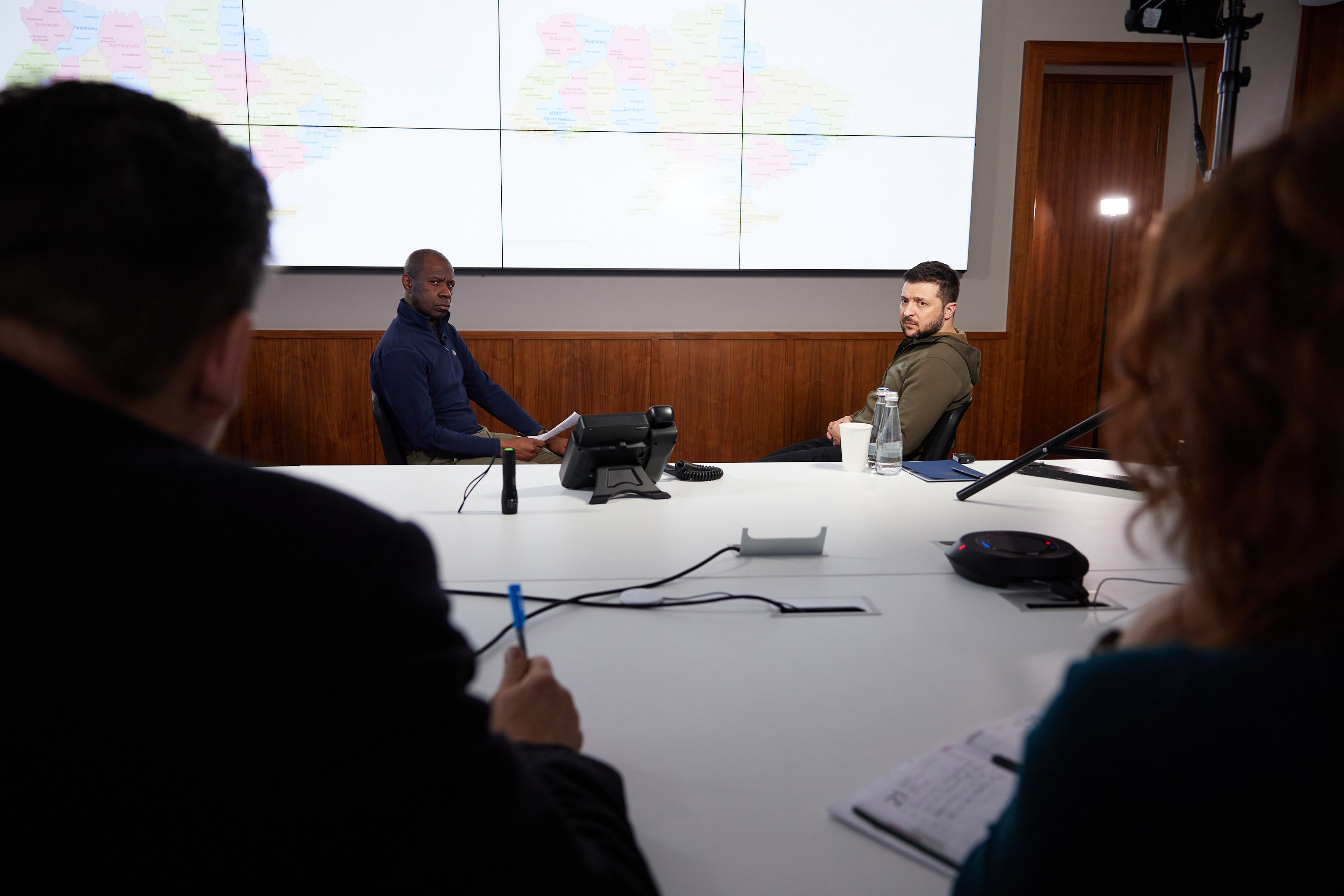
Zelensky to BBC

On 7 April 2022 Zelenskyy, apart from commenting on the on-ground situation, told Republic TV that sanctions should work like nuclear weapons. He said that nations shouldn't pretend to support Ukraine and then at the same time maintain economic relations with the enemy. In relation to India, he answered that India finds it difficult to maintain the balance and that India's relation was with the Soviets and not Russians. Security guarantees were mentioned during the 60 minute interview.

==== Russia ====
On 27 March 2022, Meduza, TV Rain and Kommersant published a video interview with Zelenskyy, along with its transcript. A few minutes before the interview was published, Roskomnadzor ordered the media to not publish it. The interviewers were Ivan Kolpakov of Meduza; Tikhon Dzyadko of TV Rain; Mikhail Zygar; 2021 Nobel Peace Prize co-winner Dmitry Muratov of Novaya Gazeta (indirectly); and Vladimir Solovyov of Kommersant. Zelenskyy spoke in Russian.

On 21 April, he spoke to Mediazona.

=== Publications ===
In Autumn 2022, it was announced that Zelenskyy would be publishing a book titled A Message From Ukraine, containing a collection of 16 of his wartime speeches, with proceeds going to United24. The book was published November 29, 2022 by Penguin Random House and The Guardian notes that: "In this short and compelling collection, Zelenskiy is the first social media orator to enter the pantheon of war speakers."

== Characteristics ==
=== Language ===
Zelenskyy has used Ukrainian, Russian and English languages in his speeches and communication.

=== Narratives ===
Messages directed towards Ukrainians remind them of their bravery, to fight, and that he has not fled.

In April 2022, a nation and place branding campaign Be Brave Like Ukraine was started by the government of Ukraine and a private creative agency. Zelenskyy was at the forefront when he spoke about Ukraine and bravery on 7 April. He would go on to use this theme.

== Reactions ==
Zelenskyy's speeches have received a generally positive response. Moira Donegan of The Guardian has stated that Zelenskyy "has made himself into a symbol of the Ukrainian people, whose surprising courage, determination, and defiance in the face of the Russian aggression have called the west's moral bluff."

Jon Henley of The Guardian has stated that Zelenskyy's speeches to foreign parliaments all contained "historical references carefully chosen to appeal to the audience" and that his "talent as an orator that has won him foreign acclaim." Some commentators have criticised Zelenskyy's use of comparisons to the Holocaust, particularly his use of the term "final solution" in his speech to the Israeli Knesset. Anjana Susarla of Michigan State University stated that Zelenskyy's addresses have had an impact due to their authenticity, their ability to connect with social media audiences, and the urgency of the messages, saying that his videos have been "short, between four and seven minutes, to the point, relatable and very personal."

Dominique Arel of the University of Ottawa has stated that Zelenskyy is "very good at [using identification in rhetoric]. He relates the human story. He was an actor before, but he's not acting now, that's why he's so effective." British journalist David Patrikarakos described Zelenskyy as "the literal man on the street," saying that he was sending a message that "I'm your president, I'm not hiding, I'm not going anywhere. I am not behind the desk or wearing a suit. I am here with the risk of being killed, like everybody else." Timothy Naftali of New York University has stated that the speeches are "a reminder that there is a life and death struggle going on — and it's forcing politicians to in real time to consider what are the acceptable risks." Olga Onuch of the University of Manchester has stated that the West was for "the first time seeing him as an equal."

Zelenskyy's use of social media to deliver messages has also attracted significant attention from commentators. Patrick Wintour of The Guardian has stated that Zelenskyy "has been constantly on the phone to western leaders, using his Twitter feed to cajole, encourage, scold and praise his allies. In the process, sanctions regarded as unthinkable a week ago have become a moral baseline." Karrin Vasby Anderson of Colorado State University has stated that "Zelenskyy's approach aims to provide ordinary citizens with content they can use easily on social media to pressure their political representatives."

== See also ==
- I need ammunition, not a ride
- List of speeches given by Vladimir Putin
- Never was so much owed by so many to so few
- We shall fight on the beaches
- Blood, toil, tears and sweat
- List of international presidential trips made by Volodymyr Zelenskyy
