= Merdeka Generation Package =

The Merdeka Generation Package (MGP) is an S$8 billion package announced by the Government of Singapore at the 2018 National Day Rally, aimed to assist Singaporeans born in the 1950s with their active ageing and reduce medical bills as they age. The MGP is a spinoff from the Pioneer Generation Package which benefitted the pioneering generation of Singaporeans.

"Merdeka" signifies the years that Singapore had worked towards colonial self governance, independence and sovereignty. The Merdeka Generation (MG) had contributed to Singapore's progress from a developing to a developed country and the challenging times such as major financial crisis, September 11 attacks, and the SARS outbreak in Singapore.

== Eligibility ==
To be eligible for the MGP, one must be a Singaporean born in the 1950s. Additionally, the package will extended to those born in 1949 or earlier and who obtained Singaporean citizenship by 1996, who had missed out on the Pioneer Generation Package.

== Benefits ==
=== Medisave 5-years Top-up ===
Under MGP, people receive a MediSave top-up of S$200 annually for five years, on top of GST Voucher-MediSave top-ups.

=== MediShield Life Higher Subsidy ===
Merdeka generation seniors, receive lifelong subsidies on their MediShield Life premiums. Those aged between 60 and 75 receive a subsidy of 5 per cent off their annual premiums. This amounts to between S$31.50 and S$48.75.

Those aged above 75 get a higher subsidy of 10 per cent amounting to between S$110 and S$153, in addition to existing means-tested subsidies .

=== Additional Outpatient Higher Subsidy ===
The Merdeka Generation receives special subsidies for common illnesses, chronic conditions and dental procedures under the Community Health Assist Scheme (CHAS). This is regardless of income and CHAS tier. The subsidy rates are higher than that of the CHAS blue card. Existing CHAS blue card holders can be subsidised up to S$18.50 per visit for common illnesses like colds and coughs. For simple chronic conditions like diabetes and hypertension, Merdeka Generation Chas blue card holders can be subsidised up to S$80 subsidy per visit, capped at S$320 per year.

Beyond CHAS subsidies, the Merdeka Generation will get their higher subsidised bills at polyclinics and public specialist outpatient clinics with additional higher subsidy.

=== Concession Card S$100 Top-up ===
Merdeka Generation seniors receive a one-time S$100 top-up to their Passion Silver concession cards to support active aging lifestyles, and as well as to be used for travelling on public transport, senior-friendly activities and facilities at Community Centres, and senior citizen concession entry to public swimming pools.

=== CPF Disability Insurance Incentive ===
Merdeka Generation seniors receive an additional participation incentive of S$1,500 to join disability insurance scheme CareShield Life, when it becomes available to existing cohorts in 2021. This is on top of the S$2,500 participation incentive previously announced, bringing the total incentive amount to S$4,000 for this group.

== See also ==
- Pioneer Generation Package
