= Pioneer Generation Package =

Singaporean government welfare scheme

The Pioneer Generation Package (PGP) is a S$9 billion package launched by the Government of Singapore in 2014, aimed at helping pioneering Singaporeans to meet retirement adequacy. PGP is designed as a series of healthcare and social support schemes to show gratitude towards pioneer Singaporeans for their contributions to Singapore during the nation's nascency. The package covers approximately 450,000 pioneer Singaporeans over an estimated 20-year period.

The package defines a "Pioneer" as a Singaporean born on or before 31 December 1949 and obtained citizenship before 31 December 1986. The Pioneer Generation Office was set up in 2014 to educate seniors about the PGP. This office was merged with the Agency for Integrated Care and renamed the Silver Generation Office from 1 April 2018 and will be managed by the Ministry of Health in a bid to streamline care for the elderly.

== Benefits ==
=== Medisave Top Ups ===
Under the PGP, pioneers will receive S$200 – S$800 Medisave top-ups yearly for life. Those born between 1945 – 1949 will receive S$200 a year, while those born in 1934 and earlier will receive S$800 a year. The first top-ups were automatically credited into Pioneer's Medisave accounts in August 2014.

=== MediShield Life ===
Seniors will receive subsidies for their MediShield Life premiums. MediShield is the universal health insurance scheme that covers all Singaporeans for life. The subsidies range from 40% discount for those aged 65 to 60% discounts for those aged 90.

=== Outpatient Bills ===
Pioneers will receive an additional 50% discount off their net bill for subsidised services and medications at Specialist Outpatient Clinics (SOCs) and polyclinics. Pioneers will also be included under Community Health Assist Scheme (CHAS), a scheme introduced in 2012 that subsidises visits to participating general practitioners and dentists. There are around 1,650 CHAS clinics in Singapore and more than 97% of CHAS or Pioneer Generation Package card holders have more than one CHAS clinic within 1 km of their homes or around 15 minutes by public transportation.

=== Disabilities Assistance ===
The Pioneer Generation Disability Scheme provides $1,200 cash for those suffering from moderate to severe functional disabilities. This is defined as those who need assistance for three out of six of daily living activities like washing, dressing, feeding, toiling, mobility and transferring.

== Communication and Outreach ==
In order to reach the pioneer citizens, the Ministry of Communications and Information and the 22 member task force — involving policy makers, the private sector health care institutions and voluntary welfare organisations — who were focused on communication and outreach of the PGP turned to broadcast media on top of the traditional print advertisements. They also set up the Pioneer Generation Ambassador pilot where ambassadors go door-to-door to raise awareness of the package.

=== Pioneer Generation Ambassadors ===
The Pioneer Generation Ambassador (PGA) Programme was set up on 1 August 2014. The PGA are volunteers who are tasked to engage Pioneers and their caregivers to explain the benefits of the PGP. By the end of November 2016, PGAs have successfully visited three in four pioneers to offer personalised resources and information. Since July 2015, PGAs have been tasked to expand their reach to all senior citizens above age 65 to connect them to community activities, to provide details on MediShield Life and other related support measures. During each visit, PGA inquire about Pioneer's health in order to offer personalised explanations of PGP and other healthcare policies according to the unique situation of each senior. In subsequent visits, PGA follow up with relevant health conditions to assess the need for further explanation or assistance.

=== Mass Communication Efforts ===
The communication and outreach of the PGP turned to broadcast media on top of the traditional print advertisements that the Government were accustomed to adopting. The Ministry of Communications and Information produced a series of videos and communication materials to inform the pioneers of the benefits of the package. The videos adopted familiar languages, formats and activities such as dialects, fortune telling, getai and mahjong.

== Effectiveness and Sentiments ==
Based on Ministry of Communications and Information’s survey conducted in August 2015, 96% of Pioneers were aware of the PGP and 87% felt assured that their healthcare costs would be made more affordable.

== See also ==
- Merdeka Generation Package
