= James LaPorta =

American marine and investigative reporter

- Born: c.1987
- Other name: Jim LaPorta
- Education: University of North Carolina Wilmington
- Years active: 2017–present
- Employer: CBS News
- Children: 1

James "Jim" LaPorta is an American investigative reporter covering national security, the Department of Defense and the Intelligence Community for Rolling Stone. His work has appeared in major outlets including The New York Times, The Washington Post, and Newsweek. A Marine, LaPorta served two tours in the Afghanistan as an infantry squad leader and intelligence cell chief. He has written extensively on the veteran community, and the social impacts of the war on terror. He has also served as a technical consultant in the film industry. His controversial firing by the Associated Press following a rare retraction from the wire service regarding a missile explosion in Poland initially reported to be a Russian attack (later attributed to Ukrainian air defenses) was widely reported.

== Investigative reporting ==
LaPorta's reporting has appeared in The New York Times, The Washington Post, Newsweek, Vice News, CBS News, CNN, NBC News, MSNBC, PBS NewsHour, and BBC News. He was the first to report the Delta Force raid in Syria which resulted in the death of Abu Bakr al-Baghdadi.

In June 2019, the installation commander of Marine Corps Base Camp Lejeune, North Carolina barred LaPorta (then still a Marine reservist) from the base on the grounds that his interview at the invitation of a female marine living on the base who reported a sexual assault and a meeting with the senior officer accused of the crime at the brig constituted violations of Marine Corps policy. Others asserted the ban was retaliation for prior reporting. He was later repeatedly denied interviews with Commandant of the Marine Corps Robert Neller on the basis of this incident.

== Film industry work ==
LaPorta has served as a technical advisor to 20th Century Studios and Wolf Entertainment for This is Us, Chicago P.D., and FBI. He also acted as a Marine for a minor role in season four of This is Us, and played a Navy SEAL in several episodes of SIX, a History channel series about SEAL Team Six.

== Personal life and military career ==
External image
- LaPorta as a Marine holding an M249 SAW while deployed in Afghanistan

LaPorta joined the United States Marine Corps in June 2006, leaving active duty in 2014 and separating from the service in 2017. He has an undergraduate certificate in Homeland Security from American Military University, and attended the University of North Carolina Wilmington, studying political science and journalism from 2014 to 2017. He is divorced, and has a son, Joel, born in late 2018.

He has written at length about his struggles stemming from his experiences in Afghanistan, which he has called "a monster in my life" which he attributes to his failed marriage, health issues, fellow servicemembers' deaths and suicides, and fears of developing cancer from exposure to burn pits. In 2021, he wrote about confronting his memories of watching a child in Helmand Province jump on, and ultimately initiate, a buried victim-operated improvised explosive device while now having a child of a similar age himself.
