= The Zelensky Effect =

2022 non-fiction book

- First edition (2022)
- Author: Olga Onuch, Henry E. Hale
- Language: English
- Genre: non-fiction
- Publisher: C. Hurst & Co.
- Publication date: November 2022
- Publication place: United Kingdom
- Media type: Hardback
- Pages: 404 pages
- ISBN: 9781787388635

The Zelensky Effect is a 2022 non-fiction book by Olga Onuch and Henry E. Hale. The book traces the development of Ukrainian civic national identity since independence and studies the leadership of President Volodymyr Zelenskyy in the context of this development, drawing on material from his pre-politics entertainment career, his 2019 campaign, and his presidency before and during Russia's full-scale invasion of Ukraine.

The authors use multiple research methods and sources of data, such as qualitative data including discourse and content analysis of material from Zelenskyy's presidency, campaign, and entertainment career (e.g. Kvartal 95 performances and Servant of the People episode transcripts); quantitative and regression analysis of data from the authors' research projects, sociological institutions, and other sources; interviews with relevant persons; and the authors' own experiences and field notes.

== Background ==
Olga Onuch is Professor (chair) in Comparative and Ukrainian Politics at the University of Manchester, making her the first full professor of Ukrainian politics in the English-speaking world. She is also principal investigator of the MOBILISE Project, a research project investigating people's choices to migrate and/or protest in response to economic or political discontent, drawing on data from Ukraine, Poland, Morocco, Argentina, and Belarus.

Henry E. Hale is Professor of Political Science and International Affairs at George Washington University.

The book was published in the first year of Russia's full-scale invasion of Ukraine, which began on 24 February 2022. The authors write that many observers were surprised by Ukraine's powerful, unified resistance and Zelenskyy's wartime leadership for various reasons, such as a focus on Zelenskyy's lack of political experience and on corruption in Ukraine; misleading narratives of Ukraine's polarisation or division; Zelenskyy's falling approval ratings until 2022; as well as the influence of "25-percenters" (a self-description used by supporters of former President Petro Poroshenko in the 2019 election who continued to oppose Zelenskyy) on perceptions of Zelenskyy abroad. They argue that "to understand the actions of ordinary Ukrainians and their leader in 2022, it is vital to understand what Zelensky represents".

== Summary ==
=== Main argument ===
The authors argue that Zelenskyy did not create, but was shaped by, exemplifies, and promotes Ukrainian civic national identity, defined by identification with the country rather than by ethnicity, language or religion, and characterised by obligations to fellow citizens as part of citizenship ("civic duty").

They further argue that Zelenskyy, as an ethnically Jewish Russian-speaker from southeast Ukraine, was especially well-placed to comprehend and validate the civic national identity of most Ukrainians, including those who may have been dismissed based on narrower visions of patriotism. They credit Zelenskyy with reinforcing and bringing more Ukrainians on board with existing developments, citing data showing that Ukrainians' surveyed support for democracy and EU and NATO membership, as well as their feeling of civic duty (e.g. the responsibility to vote and protest), increased during Zelenskyy's presidency, particularly among supporters of Zelenskyy's Servant of the People party and residents of southeast Ukraine.

They also place Zelenskyy (born in 1978) as a member of the Independence Generation, who were children in 1991 when Ukraine gained independence; they argue that this generation has played a key role in developing Ukrainian civic national identity.

Most of the book is structured chronologically around the political history of Ukraine. Ukrainian songs recommended by the authors, as well as quotes from Zelenskyy's speeches and from the poetry of Lina Kostenko, are placed between each chapter.

=== Ukraine up to 2013 ===
The authors begin their analysis with the first years of Ukraine's modern political history, including the pre-independence history of dissidence in Soviet Ukraine; the 1990–1991 Revolution on Granite; economic struggle and the rise of oligarchs, corruption, and patronal politics; and political turmoil up to and after the 2004 Orange Revolution, in parallel with Zelenskyy's childhood, early adulthood, and rising entertainment career.

The authors analyse how Zelenskyy's comedy satirised relatable experiences of Ukrainians during this period such as dealing with pervasive everyday corruption, and examine how Zelenskyy's entertainment career brought him into contact with oligarchs and put him under political pressure, such as during his 2010–2012 tenure as general producer of the TV channel Inter.

The authors also write that civic national identity began to grow during this period, as more people in most regions began identifying as Ukrainian by nationality due to identification with the state rather than ethnic descent.

=== 2013–2019 ===
Next, the authors examine developments from 2013 to 2019, beginning with the 2013–14 Euromaidan and Revolution of Dignity, as well as the beginning of Russian military aggression against Ukraine in 2014 with the annexation of Crimea and the start of the war in Donbas. They analyse Kvartal 95's messaging on Russian aggression and write that its performances were deeply supportive of Ukraine's territorial integrity, parodied Russian "colonial attitudes", and also implied blame on Ukrainian politicians for prioritising language over "civic unity".

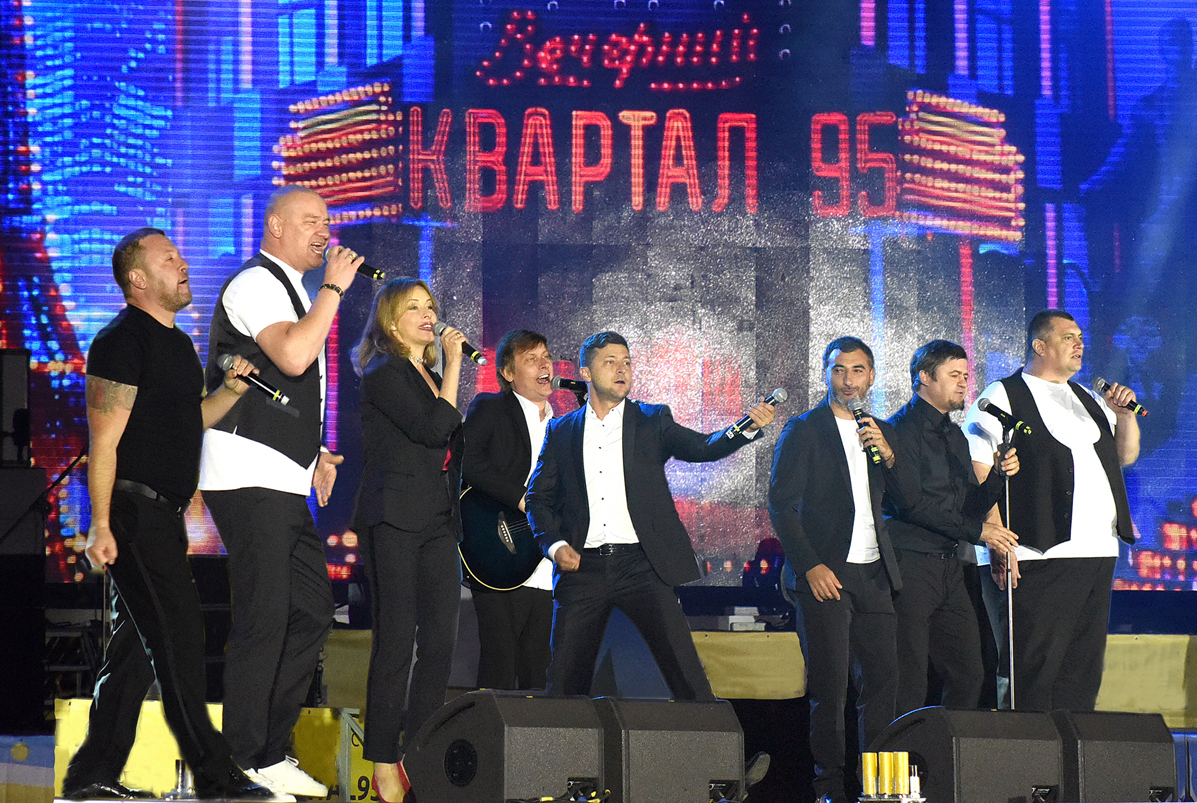
Kvartal 95 performing in 2018

While they further dismayed many of their critics by continuing to sing primarily in Russian, they consistently sang about how the invaded territories will always be Ukrainian.

— Olga Onuch, Henry E. Hale, The Zelensky Effect

The authors write that Zelenskyy already saw himself as playing a role in politics during this period because of his immensely popular political satire (for instance, 85% of Ukrainians claimed to have watched Kvartal 95's Evening Kvartal concerts before Zelenskyy's 2019 election).

The authors also analyse Servant of the People (the 2015–2019 TV series in which Zelenskyy played a fictional Ukrainian president) and identify four themes, namely "patriotism and civic duty"; corruption – including the complicity of ordinary people; the need to know and learn from history; and the message that Ukraine's strength is based on its diversity. They argue based on data that these themes dovetailed with developments in Ukrainian society, particularly the increasing civic rather than ethnic identification with the nation since 2014.

The authors also discuss the achievements of Zelenskyy's predecessor Petro Poroshenko – including military reforms that they credit with ensuring Ukraine's "survival as a state in 2022" – as well as challenges in Poroshenko's presidency, such as continued economic struggle and stalled progress fighting corruption. They study Poroshenko's cultural policies, such as decommunisation, media regulations such as language quotas to promote the Ukrainian language, and the Tomos of Autocephaly of the Orthodox Church of Ukraine, arguing that as Poroshenko's popularity fell, his focus on symbolic, cultural, and religious issues increased.

=== Zelenskyy's 2019 presidential campaign ===
The authors argue that Zelenskyy's omnipresence in the media as an entertainer, and particularly his role as a fictional president in Servant of the People, gave him a "virtual incumbency advantage" in the 2019 Ukrainian presidential election, possibly even over the actual incumbent.

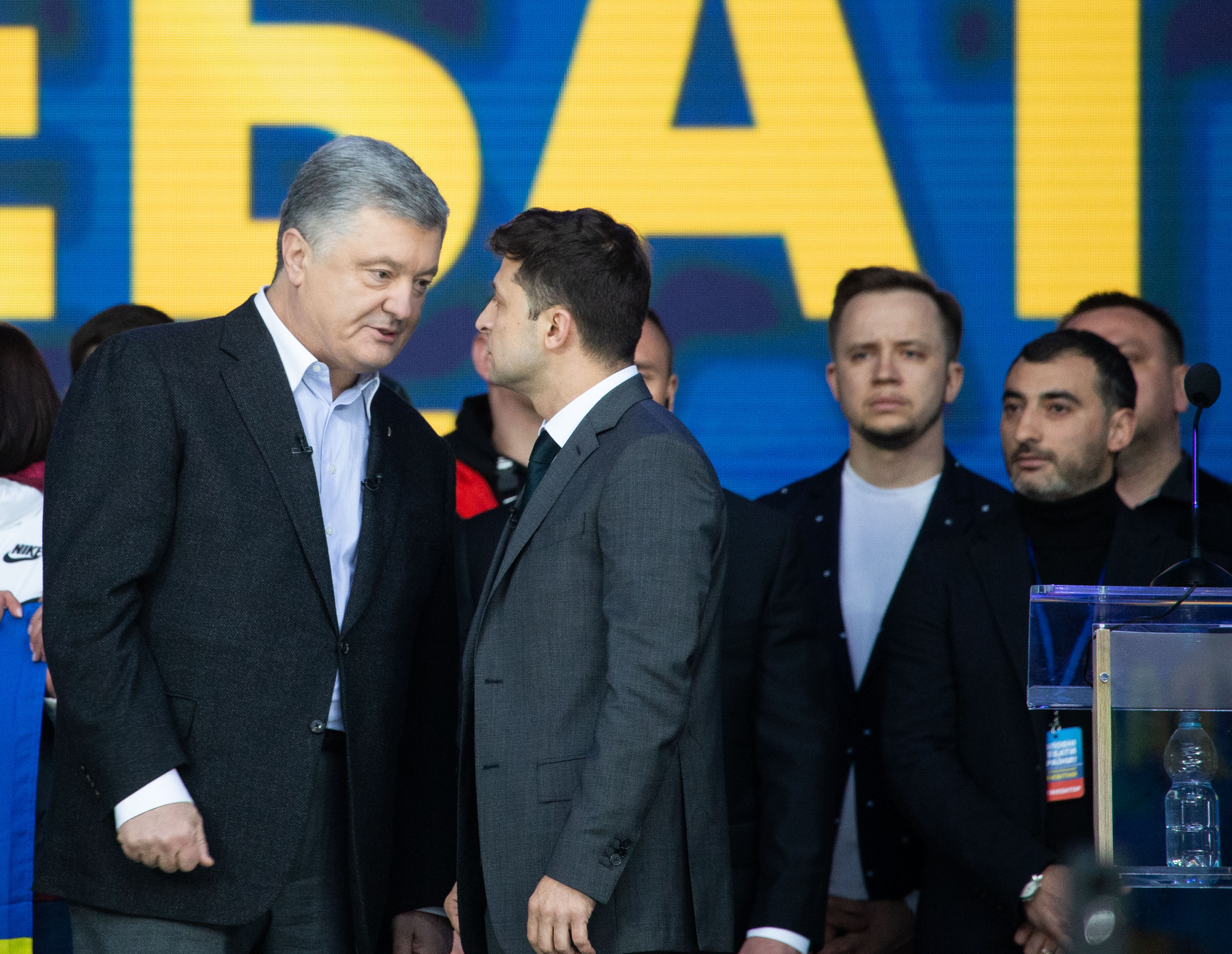
Poroshenko (left) and Zelenskyy (right) facing off in their election debate in the Olympic Stadium, 19 April 2019

They highlight four significant themes in Zelenskyy's campaign:

- improving the material well-being of ordinary people, including by addressing poverty and corruption;
- ending the war in Donbas;
- unity among all Ukrainians, regardless of region, language, or views on history;
- and Ukraine's integration with Europe.

They compare this with Poroshenko's campaign, which they argue suffered from its perceived divisiveness; they write that Zelenskyy won mainly because his image of the Ukrainian nation – civic rather than "ethnolinguistic and conservative" – was preferred by the median Ukrainian voter. They state that Poroshenko and his supporters often implied that Zelenskyy and his supporters "were not truly 'conscious Ukrainians'", quoting one scholar who said in 2019 that Zelenskyy's political project was "Little Russian" rather than "truly Ukrainian".

The authors also examine the role of oligarch Ihor Kolomoyskyi, who was suspected of controlling Zelenskyy's campaign by Poroshenko and some other observers. The authors note in their discussion that Zelenskyy and Kolomoyskyi had a good business relationship (Kolomoyskyi owned the 1+1 channel that broadcast Kvartal 95's shows), and that 1+1 under Kolomoyskyi heavily favoured Zelenskyy's campaign in its programming. However, they also argue that all major TV outlets in Ukraine are controlled by oligarchs and the inevitable need to work with one does not necessarily make one a puppet, and suggest that Zelenskyy may also have used Kolomoyskyi and 1+1 to his own advantage.

=== Presidency until 2022 ===
Next, the authors discuss Zelenskyy's presidency up to the start of the full-scale invasion on 24 February 2022. They write that despite the doubts of 25-percenters about whether Zelenskyy truly understood Ukrainian national identity, Zelenskyy's political style was deeply patriotic, focusing on civic responsibility, diversity, and history and experiences shared by Ukrainians, rather than "language, religion, and the Russian threat".

Assessing Zelenskyy's policy record, the authors write that he continued and expedited various Poroshenko-era reforms, and also single out some new reforms initiated by Zelenskyy's administration as particularly successful, such as the digitalisation of governance through the Diia app, the removal of immunity for lawmakers, and land reform aligning Ukraine with requirements for European Union accession.

They also evaluate Zelenskyy's de-oligarchisation and anti-corruption initiatives, and assess that these were "genuine" and "[appear] to have been sincere", but included some "questionable decisions".

==== Negotiations with Russia ====
The authors highlight some successes in Zelenskyy's attempts to negotiate with Russia to end the war in Donbas, as well as his attempts at compromise such as his willingness to implement the Steinmeier formula and the withdrawal of Ukrainian troops from some frontlines, which met with controversy within Ukraine.

They emphasise that although Zelenskyy was willing to negotiate with Russia, he was firmly committed to Ukraine's territorial integrity and sovereignty; this was unacceptable to Russia, eventually leading to the full-scale invasion in 2022.

=== Full-scale invasion (2022) ===
Next, the authors study Zelenskyy's wartime leadership up to late 2022 when the book was published, including his choice to stay in Kyiv and his communication with the Ukrainian public. They highlight continuity between his communication before and after the invasion, identifying themes such as unity, civic responsibility and citizenship, criticism of elites who are shirking their duties, and "Ukrainian values" – "European, democratic, civic, liberal, and inclusive" as opposed to the values of oligarchs or Russia – as well as features such as crediting achievements to all Ukrainians rather than himself, all of which they trace back to his pre-invasion presidency and/or his entertainment career.

=== Future ===
Finally, the authors explore possibilities and open questions in Ukraine's future. They call for greater study and understanding of Ukraine rather than only focusing on Russia. They also consider Zelenskyy's own political future, arguing from their data that he has widespread, "emotionally deep" support among most Ukrainians, but a minority remains (such as some former Poroshenko voters) who continue to oppose him.

They discuss future risks for Ukraine, such as a return to patronal politics; a turn to autocracy; and a reversal of the trend toward civic national identity and the rise of extreme ethnic nationalism following the trauma of war, although they do not see signs that this last point is occurring (and argue that instead, the full-scale invasion has bolstered Ukrainians' support for civic national identity).

== Reception ==
Historian Serhii Plokhy described the book as "deeply researched and well-argued" in a review published in the Washington Post. Political scientist and historian Eugene Finkel said "This wonderfully written and engaging book documents the emergence of Ukrainian civic national identity, best exemplified by Zelensky", and called the book a "must-read for anyone wishing to understand contemporary Ukraine and what Ukrainians believe, value and fight for". Political scientist and associate of the Harvard Ukrainian Research Institute Oxana Shevel called the book "an essential book for understanding how a critical mass of Ukrainians converged around a vision of Ukraine grounded in democratic ideals, a European future and sovereign statehood".

Essayist and poet Nicole Yurcaba wrote in the New Eastern Europe magazine that although the book "is a political science analysis", it is "written with such flair and personality that the dense socio-political examinations are not boring", and called it not just an analysis of Zelenskyy's own rise to power but of "a people and a nation's resolve to protect freedoms and democratic expectations that many in the world have never experienced".

Reviewer J. Fischel recommended the book for "general readers" as well as "advanced undergraduates through faculty" in Choice: Current Reviews for Academic Libraries, writing that the book should "serve as a primer" for those seeking to understand the Russo-Ukrainian War and Zelenskyy's path to the presidency, and that it "offer[ed] scholars a rich well of resources" due to its appendix of data.

Journalist Maria Lipman wrote in Foreign Affairs that the authors had "artfully combine[d]" Zelenskyy's biography with "a chronicle of Ukraine's postcommunist development, rich with empirical data and rigorous research"; Lipman added that "the book depicts the country's amazing resistance to Russian aggression as a joint achievement of the Ukrainian people and their leader".

Joshua Huminski, Senior Vice President for National Security and Intelligence Programs at the Center for the Study of the Presidency and Congress think tank, wrote in the Diplomatic Courier that the book was "truly enlightening", adding that while the West was "rightly in awe" of Ukrainian resistance to Russian aggression, reading the book "provides a deeper understanding of from where that reserve of strength originates, and the man that has come to embody Ukraine".

Lowell Barrington, Associate Professor in the Department of Political Science at Marquette University, wrote in the Nationalities Papers journal that the book was "suitable for both members of the general public and scholars and students of Ukraine"; he praised the authors' "[effective presentation]" of the "complex causal relationship involving civic national identity and Zelensky", as well as the "nuance" in their analysis of the rally 'round the flag effect. However, he argued that the book would have "benefit[ed] from more nuance" in its discussion of its "central concept of civic national identity", such as by examining more closely the role of Ukrainian citizenship or of the Ukrainian and Russian languages in the development of Ukrainian national identity.

Journalist Anna Reid wrote in the Times Literary Supplement that the book "soft-pedals the president's prewar blunders", but called it "refreshingly data-driven" as well as "convincing on why his brand of Ukrainian-ness...has such appeal".

Emily Channell-Justice, Director of the Temerty Contemporary Ukraine Program at the Harvard Ukrainian Research Institute, wrote in The Russian Review journal that the authors draw on "extensive and varied data" and that the book's "narrative is smoothly written and engaging". She added that the book largely does not feature criticisms of Zelenskyy or "an alternative perspective" on him because "the book's goal is to explain shifts in Ukrainian society and public opinion more than to assess the president himself", as well as because of the rally 'round the flag effect influencing wartime data that the authors themselves discuss in the book.

The book has been translated into Polish and Ukrainian.

== Release details ==
The book was first published in hardback format in November 2022, as part of C. Hurst & Co.'s New Perspectives on Eastern Europe and Eurasia series. In November 2023, the same publisher released a paperback version.

In March 2023, the Oxford University Press also published the book, and released an e-book version two months later.
