= Olga Onuch =

Political scientist

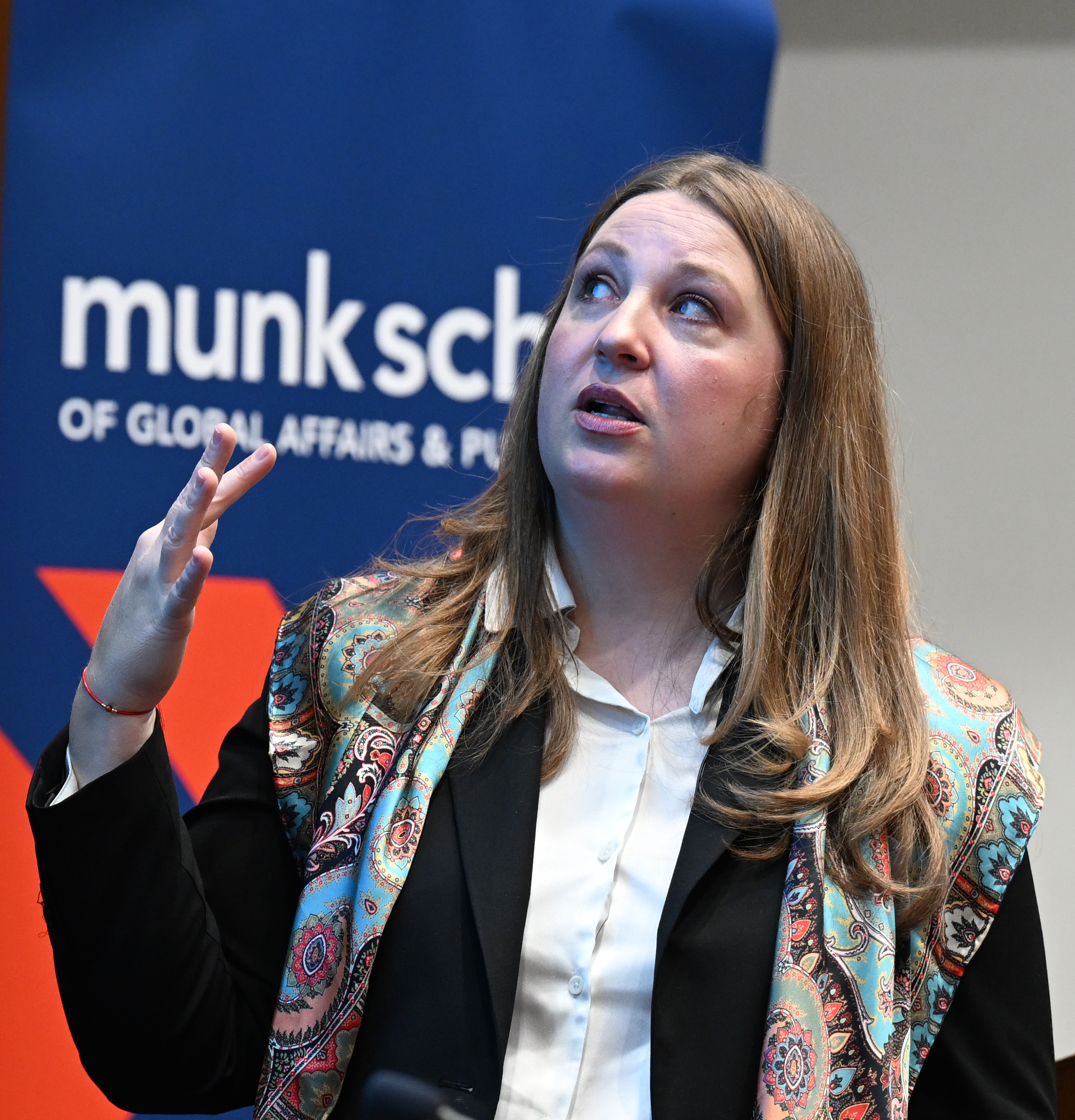
- Olga Onuch in 2026
- Born: 1982 (age 43–44)

Academic background
- Education: University of Oxford; London School of Economics; Queen's University
- Doctoral advisor: Gwendolyn Sasse; Laurence Whitehead
- Influences: Juan Linz

Academic work
- Discipline: Political science
- Sub-discipline: Comparative politics; Political behavior
- Institutions: University of Manchester; University of Oxford; Harvard University; University of Toronto
- Main interests: Protest, Elections, Identity, Democratization, Ukrainian politics, Argentine politics, Eastern Europe, Latin America, European Union, Activism
- Website: https://olgaonuch.com

Olga Onuch (born 14 September 1982) is Professor (Chair) of Comparative and Ukrainian Politics at the University of Manchester. In 2023, she became the first person to be appointed a Full Professor of Ukrainian politics at a university in the English-speaking world. She is the author of the books The Zelensky Effect and Mapping Mass Mobilization, and editor of Revolutionary Moments.

== Life ==
Onuch was born in 1982. She studied for an undergraduate degree in political science and international development studies at Queen's University, Canada, and undertook graduate study at the London School of Economics, planning to focus on Latin America, but as a result of the Orange Revolution and her Ukrainian ancestry, she opted to study protest movements. In 2010 she gained a DPhil at the University of Oxford, with a thesis comparing processes of mass mobilisation in Argentina (2001–2002), and Ukraine (2004).

After working in research roles at the University of Toronto, the University of Oxford and Harvard University, Onuch began working in Manchester in 2014.

Onuch's publications include the books Mapping Mass Mobilization: Understanding Revolutionary Moments in Argentina and Ukraine and The Zelensky Effect, co-authored with Henry E. Hale, which considers the role of civic national Ukrainian identity and its influence on President Volodymyr Zelenskyy, drawing extensively on Onuch's multi-year research on mass political mobilisation.

Onuch is involved in the Data for Ukraine project, which uses public data from Twitter to provide geolocated event data on human displacement, humanitarian needs, civilian resistance, and human rights abuses.

Onuch has said that her study is depressing but she has found the multi-cultural city of Manchester to be welcoming. She has identified the value of people who have mass-protested and she sees this behaviour as reinforcing pro-democracy views and a willingness to stay in Ukraine. She photographed the displays of Ukrainian flags in Manchester and her photos were shown on Ukrainian television.

In 2023, Onuch became the first person to be appointed a full professor of Ukrainian politics at a university in the English-speaking world.
