= 880,000 Won Generation =

880,000 Won Generation (Korean: 88만 원 세대) is a neologism that refers to a South Korean generational cohort that was born around the same years as Millennials and describes young graduates trapped in low-paying jobs ($650–$750/month). The term was coined by economist Woo Suk-hoon in 2007. The generation suffered from high youth unemployment and economic instability following the post-1997 financial crisis, and faced intense competition and limited prospects for permanent employment.

== See also ==
- 386 Generation
- N-po generation
- Hell Joseon
- 9X Generation, Vietnam
- Buddha-like mindset, China
- Freeter, Japan
- Satori generation, Japan
- Strawberry generation, Taiwan
- Tang ping, China
- Working poor
