= Shinjinrui =

Japanese people born from 1961 to 1969

Population of Japan by generation

Shinjinrui (Japanese: 新人類, lit. 'new generation') is the generation of Japanese people born between 1961 and 1969. This generation did not experience World War II and its aftermath. Shinjinrui were born just before and in the early part of Gen X in the US. Shinjinrui are "new" because they are the first generation in Japan not to wholly focus on "hard work, devotion of oneself to the company and country, and the sacrifice of the present for the future". The term was coined by Shinichiro Kurimoto (栗本慎一) around 1979 and was widely used in the 1980s in Japan in mass media such as television, radio, and popular weekly magazines both negative and positive senses.

In the 1990s, the Shinjinrui entered their child-rearing years and felt dissatisfaction toward the relaxed education system implemented in public schools.

Decades later, Shinjinrui Jr. (新人類ジュニア) was used as an alternate name of the Satori generation, Japanese people born from 1987 through 2003 – a few years ahead of Millennials in the US.

== See also ==
- Employment Ice Age
- Lost Decades
- 9X Generation, Vietnam
- Buddha-like mindset, China
- N-po generation, Korea
- Tang ping, China
- Gen Z
- Strawberry generation
