= Spoon class theory =

South Korean socioeconomic class analogy

- Hangul: 수저 계급론
- Hanja: 수저 階級論
- RR: sujeo gyegeumnon
- MR: sujŏ kyegŭmnon

The spoon class theory (Korean: 수저 계급론) is a South Korean neologism representing the idea that individuals in a country can be classified into different socioeconomic classes represented by the materials used to make spoons, based on the assets and income level of their parents, and that one's success in life depends entirely on being born into a wealthy family. The term appeared in 2015 and was first widely used among online communities in South Korea.

== Theory ==
The term is based on the English idiom "born with a silver spoon in one's mouth". In the past, European nobility often used silver dishes, and children were fed by nannies using silver spoons, which indicated the wealth of the family. In South Korea, this idea was taken further to establish several categories to classify individuals based on their family's wealth. Unlike the western idiom which simply denotes those "born with a silver spoon", Korean usage divides society into those born with a variety of spoons ranging from clay, bronze, silver, gold, and even platinum based on their parents' economic status. Those from low-income backgrounds are described as "dirt spoons".

== Usage ==
The spoon class theory began widely appearing among online communities in South Korea in 2015.

In 2019, Justice Minister Cho Kuk was engulfed in a corruption scandal after revelations that he and his wife had falsified documents for his children's college applications. The scandal resulted in his resignation after acknowledging being a "gold spoon" and led then-president Moon Jae-in to apologize. At the time, The New York Times reported:

The scandal has exploded into the biggest embarrassment of Mr. Moon’s presidency as he has struggled with an ailing economy and a lack of opportunity for many young people. It has particularly fueled outrage about the “gold spoon” children of the elite, who glide into top-flight universities and cushy jobs, leaving their “dirt spoon” peers to struggle in South Korea’s hobbled economy.

== Sociological analysis ==
Hyo Chan Cho links the concept of the "gold spoon" to Jean Baudrillard's simulacrum. He argues that the "gold spoon" exists within a simulacrum, representing an image without an origin that has become a hyperreality in modern society. Gold spoon imagery, perpetuated by media and advertising, idealizes nonexistence as existence, wielding significant influence. According to Cho, society increasingly accepts these reproduced images as more real than reality itself. This aligns with Baudrillard's theory of simulacrum, where substance is secondary to the power of the image.

Young adults preparing for life transitions such as college, marriage, or employment often feel disadvantaged, particularly when compared to their wealthier peers. Many corporations in South Korea demand exceptional academic performance and English fluency, prerequisites more accessible to the upper class due to their financial resources. In contrast, middle and lower-class individuals face the dual burden of working while studying and lacking comparable monetary support.

Economic inequality influences not only employment prospects but also broader aspects of life, such as marriage. The persistence of generational poverty has created distinct social classes. While some individuals manage to transcend their socioeconomic origins, others criticize the systemic unfairness perpetuated by the "spoon class" theory. This inequality increasingly burdens young adults and mirrors societal structures described in spoon class theory.

Park Jae-wan, a professor at Sungkyunkwan University, analyzed the spoon class theory through the lens of social mobility. He noted that South Korea's income distribution aligns closely with advanced nations, citing indicators like the Gini coefficient and relative poverty rates. However, he argued that the evidence supporting "gold spoon" claims is weak. Park identified five causes behind the spoon class theory: youth unemployment, intergenerational wealth transfer, government regulation and vested interests, relative deprivation among Koreans, and weak social capital.

== See also ==
- Hell Joseon
- Lottery of birth
- Sampo generation
- Economic inequality in South Korea
- Poverty in South Korea
