= Buddha-like mindset =

Chinese youth term for people who reject the rat race

- Chinese: 佛系
Transcriptions
Standard Mandarin
- Hanyu Pinyin: fóxì
- Bopomofo: ㄈㄛˊ ㄒㄧˋ
- Gwoyeu Romatzyh: forshih
- Wade–Giles: fo^{2}-hsi^{4}
Yue: Cantonese
- Jyutping: fat^{6} hai^{6}

Buddha-like (Chinese: 佛系; pinyin: fóxì), is a buzzword used in China to describe young people who reject the rat race of contemporary workaholic Chinese society for a tranquil, apathetic life. The term is a neologism combination of two Chinese characters: "fó" (Chinese: 佛), meaning "Buddha"; and "xì" (Chinese: 系), meaning "series" or "school". Young people who uphold the Buddha-like mindset are referred to as Buddha-like youths (Chinese: 佛系青年) or Generation Zen.

The term originated in a 2014 issue of the Japanese women's fashion magazine Non-no to refer to Japanese men who had progressed from being herbivore men to being monk-like men (Japanese: 仏男子) who consider it too exhausting to even bother interacting with women and instead enjoy being by themselves. The term has also been applied to numerous areas, such as parenting, employment, online shopping, fandom, dating, and interpersonal relationships. Although the word is inspired by the Buddhist doctrine of becoming spiritually satisfied through giving up anything tied to avarice, it is not a Buddhist principle.

The "Buddha-like" label is primarily adopted by young Chinese men from the post-90s and post-00s generations referring to their less-than-optimistic life outlook; however, some post-80s experiencing quarter-life crises also admit subscribing to the mindset. Stressed out by poor job prospects, decreased life satisfaction, increasingly stagnant social mobility, a disappointing romantic life, familial complications of the one-child policy, and soaring housing prices, youths have adopted the term to maintain their fortitude and as a backlash against society's high expectations. For example, the adherents of Buddha-like parenting would say that "there are not that many kids who will really amount to much, so why give them an exhausting childhood?" Advertisers have also used the term to market their products. In the technology industry, the Buddha-like mindset is seen as promoting work–life balance and thus the polar opposite of the 996 working hour system. The Buddha-like mindset has been compared to the sang and diaosi subcultures in being a softer, more moderate instance of counterculture.

The term gained attention in December 2017, when the WeChat account Xin Shixiang (Chinese: 新世相, "New World Scenes"), which is operated by a media company, posted an article titled "The first group of post-90s generation who have become monks" (Chinese: 第一批90后已经出家了). It went viral and led to the term's widespread adoption in Chinese society as youth consider it in vogue. It summarised the Buddha-like mindset as "It's okay to have, and it's okay not to have; no competition, no fight, no winning or losing." The Chinese Communist Party has denounced the mindset as an unproductive, unpatriotic impediment to the country's ambition of becoming a superpower. Proponents have praised the mindset as relieving youths' stress and reducing resentment.

== Etymology ==
=== Origins ===
The neologism "Buddha-like" or "foxi" (Chinese: 佛系) was used for the first time in a 2014 issue of the Japanese women's fashion magazine Non-no. In 2006, the writer Maki Fukasawa coined the term herbivore men, which is a precursor to "foxi". Herbivore men have the qualities of being refined, frugal, quiet, and gentle but also unambitious, depressed, and pessimistic. Disinterested in accumulating material possessions and wealth, herbivore men do not care about forming relationships with women or having sex. They prefer spending time on their interests and with family.

Non-no said that eight years following the coining of herbivore men, Japanese men have progressed into Buddha-like men (Chinese: 佛系男). Japanese commentators said the men's evolution to Buddha-like happened for multiple reasons, including Japan's economic weaknesses. A substantial number of men in their 20s and 30s live with their parents, who take care of them like children. This causes the men to not try creating their own family as that would entail taking risks like courting and being rejected by women. As Japan's patriarchal society is gradually being dismantled, women, after having developed stronger personalities, have become hard for men to manage, commentators say.

Men, who think it is unnecessary to have girlfriends, have grown to liking being by themselves. Buddha-like men live by the maxim that "Interest is the most important". Not wanting to spend time worrying about other people, these men enjoy being alone and doing things on their own schedule. Considering romantic relationships to be troublesome, Buddha-like men do not need girlfriends and find it exhausting to interact with women.

Whereas herbivore men did not care about love or sex, Buddha-like men have evolved into being like monks who isolate themselves from women. Their behaviour is like the character Gautama Buddha in the Japanese comedy manga series Saint Young Men. The phrase was used in the context of the otaku subculture to discuss men disinterested in having relationships with women and who were spending all their time on their career or hobbies.

On 11 December 2017, a Chinese media company posted an article titled "The first group of post-90s generation who have become monks" (simplified Chinese: 第一批90后已经出家了; traditional Chinese: 第一批90後已經出家了) on its WeChat account Xin Shixiang (Chinese: 新世相), which had four million followers. The essay, which discussed Buddha-like youth, went viral, in two days receiving over one million views on WeChat and 60 million on Sina Weibo. It was the first time on Chinese platforms that the phrase "Buddha-like" became viral and led to the neologism's broad adoption in Chinese society.

According to the scholar Jie Yang, the article was widely read by millions of viewers in China who connected with its message of living a Zen-like existence of being apathetic towards both wins and losses in life to confront the increased stress they feel from their community. Writing in a Chongqing University journal, Ouyang Zhao and Zhao Yangyang said that the media company's "use of strong appeal and sensational writing greatly promoted" the Buddha-like mindset and "caused widespread concern about the phenomenon". The article summarised the Buddha-like mindset as "It's okay to have, and it's okay not to have; no competition, no fight, no winning or losing." To illustrate the mentality, it described youths' being indifferent to the food they would consume at lunchtime so day after day they would eat identical meals.

The essay catalogued several applications of the philosophy to everyday life: "Buddha-like passengers" (Chinese: 佛系乘客), "Buddha-like workout" (Chinese: 佛系健身), "Buddha-like parenting" (simplified Chinese: 佛系养娃; traditional Chinese: 佛系養娃), "Buddha-like online shopping" (simplified Chinese: 佛系网上购物; traditional Chinese: 佛系網上購物), and "Buddha-like employment" (Chinese: 佛系上班). Shao Shiwei, the chief marketing officer of the media company that made the viral post, said that they get hundreds of thousands of messages from their followers whose stories inspired the viral essay about Buddha-like youths.

=== Morphology ===
The term is a concatenation of the word "Buddha" (Chinese: 佛, pronounced as "fo") and the word "series" (Chinese: 系, pronounced as "xi"). The first word, "fo", references religious leaders like Sakyamuni, Amitabha, and Yaoshi or Buddha concepts like Buddhism, statues, and the sutra. The second word, "xi", is about "belonging to or relating to something". The combination of the two words forms a blended space. Although the phrase's original use was to discuss men, its usage in China is not confined to men.

=== Roots in Buddhism and Chinese culture ===
Individuals use metaphors like "foxi" upon realising that existing words' plain definitions are unable to capture what they want to convey. Those who have a foxi mindset are not necessarily Buddhist adherents. The term is inspired by the Buddhist guidance to achieve satisfaction by forsaking anything tied to avarice. But instead of being focused on the religious teachings, the Buddha-like mindset recommends having a laissez-faire view on living.

According to Xuecheng, the Buddhist Association of China's president, the Buddha-like mindset is not rooted in the dharma's teachings. Xuecheng said the mentality is from apathy inspired by deprecating oneself when one lacks agency. He stated that "the Buddha-like mindset has its predicaments. Escape is not the solution. One can say 'let it be' whenever one wants, but one must face reality and be a responsible person."

"Buddha-like" reflects Chinese culture's "dualistic spiritual model of 'being out of the world/entering the world'" even though it has its roots in another country. People online generally refer to the youth as "Buddha-like young people" (Chinese: 佛系青年). Buddha-like youth primarily refers to Chinese people in the post-90s generation and also refers to people in the post-00s generation.

=== Social context ===
Mainland Chinese youth born in the 1990s find it challenging both career-wise and romance-wise. The youngsters are burdened by high academic and career expectations because of China's one-child policy. Like people born in Generation X in the United States, the post-90s youth probably have tough prospects of leading a life as good as their parents did, scholar Jie Yang wrote. The youth face soaring home purchase costs. With men massively outnumbering women, it is challenging to form relationships. They believe that social mobility ceased being prevalent after the post-80s established themselves in their careers and in life.

The youth consider social mobility to be nonexistent in which it is improbable and expensive to rise up the socioeconomic ladder when born to a family that is not well-off. To complain about their plight, the youth facetiously say they are Buddha-like youth. They jokingly refer to themselves as "prematurely balding", "monks or nuns", "divorcees", and the "middle-aged obese". Those with Buddha-like mindset adopt catchphrases like "anything will do", "let it be", and "take life as it is".

They embrace the saying, "Life itself is hard enough, and we just can't afford to make it harder on our own." When asked a question, the youth typically respond with "okay" or "sure". The difficulties of life have caused the youth to deem themselves to be that way despite none of those attributes applying to them. Their response is a backlash against the highly ruthless jobs market and the culture's relentless focus on high salaries.

According to Tian Feng, a Chinese Academy of Social Sciences research fellow, this is rooted in China experiencing very quick growth which leads to numerous transformations. Tian said that it was predictable that Chinese youth would embrace this "self-mocking subculture", which would percolate on the Internet. Xu Hua, a professor at the School of Sociology and Political Science at Anhui University, said that by adopting the "Buddha-like mindset", youth can remain "calm and flexible", allowing them to, in the course of time, assume increased duties.

Youth in Hong Kong have adopted the Buddha-like mindset as they face a similar plight of no longer having the social mobility opportunities their parents had. In 2020, the average Hong Kong home cost HKD$9.72 million (US$1,250,965.25) while Hong Kong male workers in the last quarter of that year had a median monthly income of HKD$20,000 (US$2,574). This meant that it would take a median male worker's entire income of over 40 years of working to pay off a house. Feeling that purchasing the expensive property is out of reach, Hong Kong youth adopt the Buddha-like mindset of not fretting over buying property. The youth also suffer from insufficient labour rights and too much competition.

Agility Research, a research firm based in Singapore, published a survey in August 2018 of well-off Chinese people born between 1995 and 2000 in which over half of them called themselves "Buddha-like youth". The National Language Monitoring and Research Center, a research center under the Ministry of Education of the People's Republic of China, listed "Buddha-like mindset" in 2018 as number four in its yearly "most popular" Internet slang list.

== Usage ==
In 2017, Chinese youth began extensively using the newly coined phrase "Buddha-like" or "foxi" as they consider it to be in vogue. The youth embrace the mentality of neither caring about achievements nor about getting evaluated by others. Escaping the rat race lifestyle, they aim to take actions that they want to do or believe are correct.

When they encounter difficulties in life, a Buddha-like mentality enables the youth to experience a respite and liberates them from the concomitant pessimistic feelings. Proud of being associated with the term, the youth purchase attire embroidered with "Buddha-like mentality". On social media, they created stickers such as about "Buddha-like workers" with the caption, "Don't resign, don't change jobs, fate will come, naturally will become rich".

On 21 January 2018, the game Travel Frog, which was released by the Japanese company Hit-Point, reached number one in downloads in the "free app" category and was one of Sina Weibo's top queries. Its protagonist is a frog who travels in Japan and mails postcards and dainty food from the areas the frog visits. Commentators said the game attracted players with the Buddha-like mindset through its leisurely tempo in which players do minimal work. When playing Travel Frog, players largely are viewing an empty home in anticipation of their frog coming back from the frog's travels. Ma Xiquan, a Shanghai East Hospital clinical psychologist, found that Travel Frog embodies its gamers' "low social demands" and complements their Buddha-like philosophy of going through life in a relaxed manner.

"Buddha-like" or "foxi" has been applied to numerous circumstances:

- The term "Foxi qingnian" (Chinese: 佛系青年), who are Buddha-like youth, endeavour to have a relaxed life in competitive urban landscape. Having vigorously attempted their best in the past, the youth recognise that their efforts do not guarantee success. They become more relaxed in their efforts which improves their perspective. A person in a "Buddha-like relationship" completely tolerates how their spouse behaves and makes no attempt to demand that they adjust their behaviour.
- As "foxi lianren" (simplified Chinese: 佛系恋人; traditional Chinese: 佛系戀人) who are "Buddha-like lovers", they do not view each other as potential forever soulmates. Treating their romantic relationship casually, they start dating when they get along together. When the lovers end their relationship, they nonchalantly leave without drowning their sorrows or weeping. A person in a "Buddha-like career" focuses on doing the immediate work and does not care about workplace politics or career advancement. Instead of choosing a well-paying but more difficult job, they opt for a job that pays less and is not as difficult.
- As "foxi zhiyuan" (simplified Chinese: 佛系职员; traditional Chinese: 佛系職員), who are "Buddha-like staff", they blindly follow what their employer says and are indifferent to the boss' commendations and reproaches against them. A person who does "Buddha-like childrearing" is the polar opposite of the strict tiger parenting style widely adopted in China.
- As "foxi fumu" (Chinese: 佛系父母), who are Buddha-like parents, they do not envision their offspring's accomplishing much in life. In keeping with the theme that it is hopeless to exert themselves, their rationale is that, "there are not that many kids who will really amount to much, so why give them an exhausting childhood?" They have a lenient parenting style in which they permit their offspring to try activities the children enjoy instead of requiring them to do unenjoyable activities. They engage in "foxi gouwu" (simplified Chinese: 佛系购物; traditional Chinese: 佛系購物), or "Buddha-like shopping" in which as online buyers, they strive to work through any issues with the product on their own instead of reaching out to the merchant. If they purchase pants online but receive socks, they avoid investing time and effort in making a complaint by accepting the socks. They are disinterested in sending back goods even if they receive wares that are counterfeit or shabby.
- "Foxi fensi" (simplified Chinese: 佛系粉丝; traditional Chinese: 佛系粉絲), who are Buddha-like fans, take a more relaxed approach to supporting the celebrity they admire. They do not get into fights with fellow fans over their idol, and they are unperturbed by their celebrity's turbulent life.
- In "Buddha-like weight loss" simplified Chinese: 佛系减肥; traditional Chinese: 佛系減肥), people are unhurried and unworried about their progress. They refuse to turn away delicious food if it comes their way. For example, if they see delicious street food, or if friends invite them for a meal, they will go eat the food. Their mentality is that it is fine whether or not they lose weight.

In Hong Kong, online news HK01's editor Chan Pakyu called Kenneth Ma "the entertainment industry's only 'Buddha-like male god'". Chan said Ma met the qualities through being nonchalant about underperforming commentators' expectations at the TVB Anniversary Awards ceremony, his casual attire, and his perceived more passive approach to dating.

In 2018, the Democratic Progressive Party (DPP) and Lai Ching-te, the Premier of Taiwan, faced criticism about having a Buddha-like mindset regarding Taiwanese independence from China. A coalition advocating for independence, including the Olympic medalist Chi Cheng, launched a petition for Taiwan to change the name it competed under at the 2020 Summer Olympics from "Chinese Taipei" to "Taiwan". The coalition was dissatisfied with the DPP's not backing the change.

After Sweden said it would have changed course during the COVID-19 pandemic, a Chinese publication said Sweden was ceasing to be Buddha-like in its pandemic response.

=== Technology industry ===
In the Chinese technology field, a number of companies have adopted the 996 working hour system in which employees do their jobs from 9:00 am to 9:00 pm, six days per week. In pursuit of work–life balance, some in the industry have adopted the antithetical philosophy of being "Buddha-like entrepreneurs". People known as "Buddha-like entrepreneurs" include Su Hua, the CEO of the video-sharing app Kuaishou, and Chen Rui, the CEO of the video-sharing website Bilibili. Members of the Chinese media have labelled founders of startups with the term when the founders give up on fighting for market share in the cutthroat industry. The entrepreneurs choose to prioritise having a decent work–life balance by taking their time in building their products. Zhou Hongyi, the CEO of the security company Qihoo 360, said that workers who have a Buddha-like mindset are not compatible with the tech industry since tiny missteps might cause massive errors.

=== Advertising ===
The advertising industry has created advertisements addressing or advocating the Buddha-like mindset. Adidas' "Here to Create" campaign attracted a significant number of sportspeople who urged individuals not to be Buddha-like youth. To encourage people to enter the "spiritual comfort zone", KFC launched a "Comfort Zone" campaign.

JD Finance, a corporate spin-off from JD.com, created an advertisement with the theme, "You Don't Have to Be Successful". Using exaggerated dialogue, the ad promoted the Buddha-like lifestyle by saying, "Life: You don't have to buy a big house, don't have to borrow three million when your monthly salary is 10,000. 30 years later, when your children ask what stories you have in those days, you cannot just have stories about loans."

Other companies created advertisements including: "Recommendation of a must-visit Buddha-like travel destination", "Buddha-like hot jewelry in winter releases calm and stability", "How to dress an adult harmless Buddha-like girl", and "Download this wooden fish rock and roll to show you the Buddha-like charm". The advertisements played a substantial role in popularising the Buddha-like concept.

== Comparison to other subcultures ==
The Buddha-like philosophy shares the same subculture as diaosi in which young people are "self-deprecating" and "defying the mainstream". It has been compared to the "sang" culture (simplified Chinese: 丧文化; traditional Chinese: 喪文化), also known as "funeral culture", where individuals are lacking passion and aspirations. Both "sang" culture and the "Buddha-like" mindset are inspired by China's exacting demands and young people's repudiation of those standards in a mostly self-effacing manner. The "sang" culture urges individuals to "openly embrace and even competitively perform despair, burnout, misfortune, and everyday failures, representing people without desires, ambitions, or aims".

The two lifestyles share self-deprecation with the Buddha-like mindset, not only fully embracing the "sang" culture but also building on it by recommending people to take a constructive approach. Instead of having people ravage themselves through having too high of a standard, the Buddha-like mindset urges people to maintain their sanity and be flexible with dynamic situations.

Jie Yang, an anthropology professor at Simon Fraser University, said that the Buddha-like mindset seems to be "a less stressful, more self-centered, and relatively healthy one" compared to the "sang" lifestyle. She found the mindset to be "self-therapizing". Comparing it to the therapy practiced in Western nations, Yang found that the Buddha-like mindset does not indicate that someone is susceptible. Instead, it indicates a person is "self-driven" and deliberate. Yang said the Buddha-like mindset was similar to concepts in Chinese culture related to self-preservation. She cited the Chinese concept of "nande hutu" (simplified Chinese: 难得糊涂; traditional Chinese: 難得糊塗), created by the Qing dynasty philosopher Zheng Xie, that means, "It is hard to pretend muddleheadedness".

The concept influenced people to follow the notion of "hutuxue" (simplified Chinese: 糊涂学; traditional Chinese: 糊塗學), meaning "the study of muddleheadedness". The adage is that even though people desire the trait of brilliance, the actual brilliance comes from being purposefully muddled. When faced with hardship, people who follow the "nande hutu" philosophy aim to excuse misfortune and to avoid getting furious about their situation by undergoing "emotional or cognitive reconstruction". The Buddha-like philosophy has been compared to the tang ping or "lie down" (Chinese: 躺平) philosophy an author introduced in 2021 in which the author had stopped working for two years and stopped caring about consumption.

According to a Chongqing University journal, the Buddha-like mentality, the diaosi subculture, and the sang subculture are "inextricably linked" since "the social backgrounds and group mentalities they generate are highly similar" but have key differences. Whereas the diaosi and sang subcultures cast the blame for people's misfortune on extrinsic factors, the Buddha-like philosophy casts the blame inwards, bemoaning themselves for having physical and mental weaknesses and for being born in the wrong era. The Buddha-like mindset is more biased to action and can be put more into practice in everyday life than the diaosi and sang subcultures.

The Buddha-like philosophy is to "don't fight, don't grab; let everything go" and urges tranquility and is a "sweet-hearted" mentality. On the other hand, diaosi adherents have an "unwilling" mentality while sang followers have a dispirited mentality. Buddha-like youth reject consumerism by saying, "I have the right not to consume, I have the right not to follow the logic led by consumerism, and I have the right not to pursue the materialism advocated by consumerism." It is a progression from the diaosi subculture that covets the materialism of the wealthy and the sang subculture that finds passing pleasure in purchasing goods.

== Commentary ==
=== Criticism ===
People, especially those who are older, have criticised the Buddha-like philosophy. Their contention is that Buddha-like youth are lazy, fatalistic, and unambitious. After an article about the Buddha-like mindset went viral on social media, the Communist Youth League of China published an article with the headline, "So-called 'Zen-generation' are a total tragedy for youth". It lamented, "Only when the young have ambitions and are responsible can a nation have prospects." Tung Zhenhua, a professor at the Central Party School of the Chinese Communist Party, was critical of the Buddha-like mindset, writing that it would make "reinvigorating the zhonghua minzu (中華民族) and the Chinese dream hard to achieve".

In a 2 January 2018 article, the Global Times, a newspaper published by the Chinese Communist Party (CCP) from a deeply nationalistic perspective, denounced people who had a Buddha-like mindset. Viewing them as lacking patriotism and motivation, the Global Times said the Buddha-like mindset "has drawn concern from mainstream media and scholars" with "[some holding] that this 'low-desire' mindset will eventually hold back the nation from progressing further as a rising world superpower". The publication interviewed a professor focused on studying youth who said that the youths' apathy was "horrible" and urged the CCP to "mobilize the motivation inside the young, particularly about their beliefs".

Xuan Loc Doan wrote in the Asia Times, a Hong Kong newspaper, that the growing number of youth who subscribed to the Buddha-like mindset illustrated how the CCP had failed to convince them to adopt the beliefs of the party despite the Xi Jinping Administration's expending substantial effort into attempting to persuade them through propaganda like rap songs, virtual concerts with celebrities shown via hologram, and matchmaking gatherings. am730 columnist Chan Yatlong, a secondary school student, found that the Buddha-like mindset was "a waste of time" as it was a mismatch for enthusiastic young people and urged her peers to take the initiative on addressing any misfortunes in their lives.

=== Praise ===
Zhang Yiwu suggested that as the Chinese populace became progressively prosperous, the youngsters were released from the burden of having to improve their prospects in a fiercely cutthroat world. Zhang said, "When maintaining a decent life is easy but going upward is hard, youngsters will develop a Buddha-like mindset." Zhang said there could be benefits from the Buddha-like mindset if practitioners also were driven in their work, opening unconventional avenues for them to follow.

Writing in a Chongqing University journal, Ouyang Zhao and Zhao Yangyang had a mixed review of the Buddha-like mindset. They stated that on the one hand, it was "a product of technology and commercial entrapment" and has "a certain degree of negative decadence" that would hurt society if left unchecked. On the other hand, the duo found that people with the Buddha-like mindset are noted for having tranquil thoughts, are disinterested in becoming famous, and "may be able to alleviate conflicts and contradictions in society and relieve the life pressure of youth groups".

== See also ==
- Strawberry generation
- Tang ping
- Zhou Liqi, Chinese slacker influencer

International:

- 9X Generation, Vietnam
- Herbivore men, Japan
- N-po generation, Korea
- Satori generation, Japan

General:

- Dropout
- Generation Z
- Hermit
- Hippy
- Men Going Their Own Way
- Slacker
