= MZ generation =

Demographic cohort in South Korea

In South Korea, MZ generation (Korean: MZ세대; RR: MZ-sedae) is a neologism to describe the demographic cohort comprising Millennials and Generation Z. While other cultures often separate the generations as distinct groups, MZ is more commonly used in South Korea. The term is often used, but it has also been criticized for being too broad and conflating the identities of people in their teens, twenties, thirties, and forties.

The term was coined by marketing professor Kim Nan-do, and popularized through his 2019 book Trend Korea. MZ generation was preceded by the 2010s terms N-po generation and sampo generation, which refer to the idea of giving up on achieving life goals such as job security, marriage, and homeownership.

In 2021, The Korea Herald reported that the MZ generation—defined as Millennials (those born 1980–1994) and Generation Z (those born 1995–2004)—made up 35.5% of South Korea's population, with 3.43 million members. In 2020, about 54.9% of Millennials (1980–1994) and 50.2% of Generation Z (1995–2005) lived in the Seoul metropolitan area.

According to the Korea JoongAng Daily, the phrase MZ generation "was meant to describe a rising cohort of digital natives who are socially conscious, tech-savvy, and trend-sensitive." The MZ generation is also the most educated and globally connected generation in South Korea, and has desire for better work–life balance. Regarding trends in consumption, the Ministry of Culture, Sports and Tourism wrote that 2024 report by Statistics Korea stated that the MZ generation was characterized by "YOLO" (an outlook that prioritizes personal happiness), "meaning out" (consuming in a way that reflects one's values), and "flex" ("consumption to show off one's existence"). Of the MZ generation, academics Kim Uichol and Kim Jisun write: "They are not the passive, indifferent or individualistic, as described by the media. They are using their purchasing power to point out problems and boycott negative behaviours among businesses and governments." While previous generations of Koreans relied more strongly on family networks, the MZ generation values friends and online communities.

== See also ==
- Demographics of South Korea
- Zillennials
- 386 Generation
- 880,000 Won Generation
