= TUSM =

TUSM may refer to:

- Temple University School of Medicine, in the United States
- Tufts University School of Medicine, in the United States
- Shanghai Tongji University School of Medicine, in Shanghai, China
- SC-89 (TUSM), a surface mount device manufactured by Renesas Electronics
