= Sanhe Gods =

Migrant day labourers in the Longhua district of Shenzhen, China

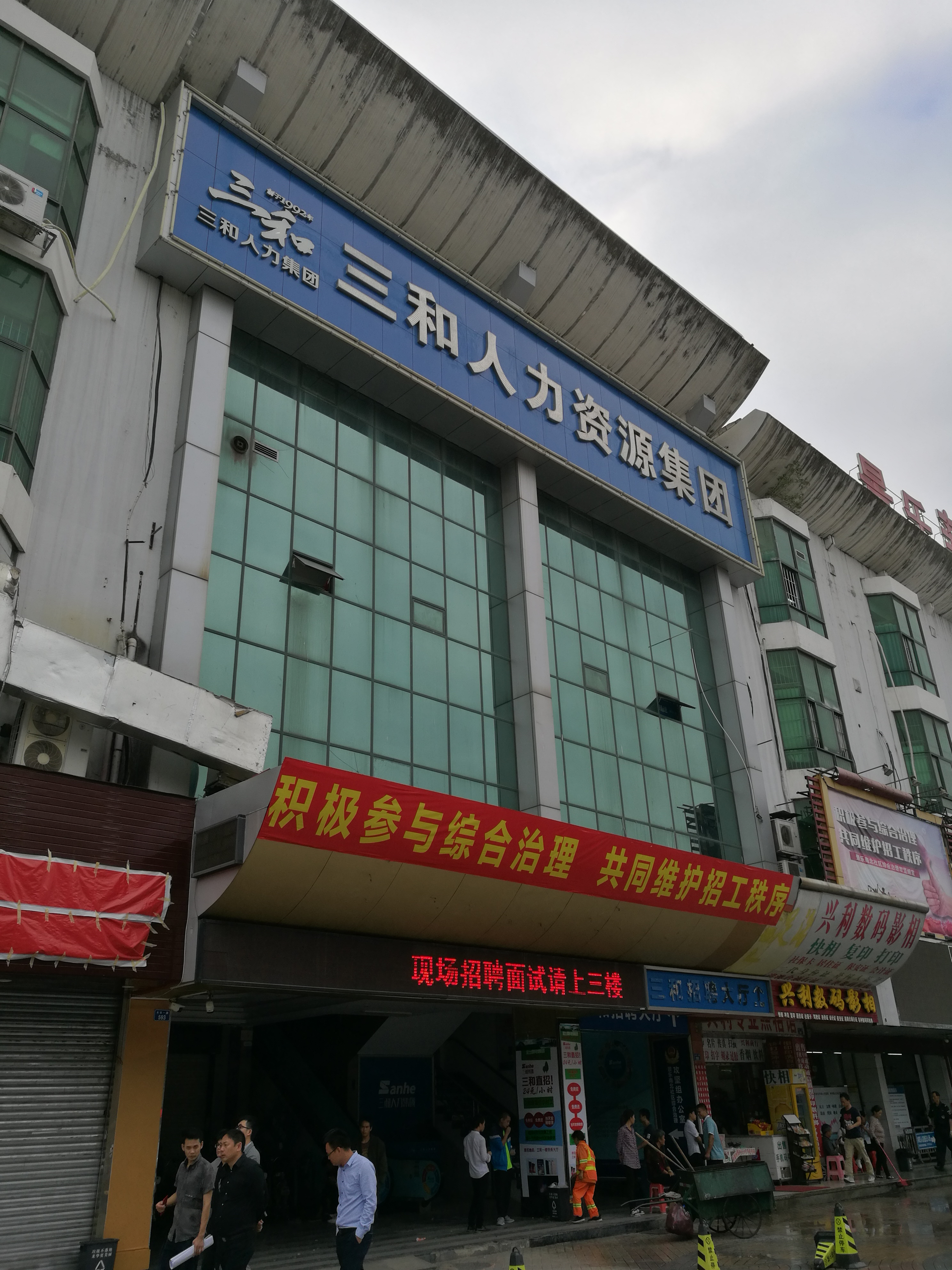
The 'Sanhe Talent Market' in Shenzhen

The Sanhe Gods (三和大神) are migrant day labourers in the Longhua district of Shenzhen, China. Their motto is "work one day, play three days (做一天玩三天)," and they often follow the lying flat (躺平) counterculture philosophy. This way of life has greatly influenced social media, where they have formed a distinct subculture with a strong online presence and network. Even though this media movement has been censored by the government, because it tarnishes the image of a prosperous and successful developing China, these platforms also serve as a cry for help, as many Sanhe Gods survive on just 2 RMB (less than $1) a day before returning to job hunting. The term "Sanhe Gods" is unique to Shenzhen, but a similar population exists in Beijing, Shanghai, Kunshan, and several other cities.

== Etymology ==
The term "Sanhe Gods" (or "Sanhe Dashen") originated from the 'Sanhe Talent Market' in Shenzhen, which was a centre where thousands of young migrant workers gathered to look for temporary jobs. The word "Sanhe" originated from the name of the labour recruitment agency but became a name for the surrounding area. The word "Dashen" (or "Gods") was used by online communities, in a sarcastic tone, to describe these unemployed youth who seem to have achieved some form of "spiritual transcendence" by rejecting mainstream labour values.

The name carries a sense of irony and contempt. On the one hand, "God" symbolizes freedom from social constraints. On the other hand, it mocks the marginalization that these young people are facing. They believe in a minimalist and detached lifestyle because they only engage in short-term work when necessary to meet basic needs such as food or cheap Internet access. This counterculture challenges the traditional understanding of success and professional ethics in reformed China and exposes the contradiction between rapid urbanization and an unstable labor market.

Online platforms such as Baidu Tieba and Bilibili popularized the term "Sanhe God" through viral posts and documentaries, making it a symbol of internet memes and urban disillusions. Therefore, the collective identity of the "Sanhe Gods" transformed the sense of shame into a symbolic resistance which created its own subculture. Their perceived failure in the labor market reflects the broader sense of insecurity in China's unstable employment system.

== Demographic and background ==
The Sanhe Gods were mostly born in the 1990s and typically moved to Shenzhen from the countryside as young adults. In many cases they were raised not by their parents but by their extended family as parents moved to the cities for work as part of the first generation of migrant workers after the advent of reform and opening up. The Sanhe Gods therefore belong to the second generation of migrant workers, whom sociologist Xiaoshuo Hou describes as being "workers who are not as attached to their home villages as their parents were and who go straight from school to the city, having little training and experience in farming". Sanhe Gods typically lack the education or qualifications to get well-paid jobs in Shenzhen. On moving to the city, many fail to find full-time work, while others find jobs in factories but later quit. Reasons for quitting include dissatisfaction with working hours, conditions, or disciplinary measures. Furthermore, many were the victims of scams where their pay was withheld. No longer seeking full-time employment, they rely on the Sanhe Talent Market for day jobs while living in the nearby Jingle New Village. Most commonly these jobs are in delivery facilities, although work as security guards or on construction sites is generally preferred, being seen as less taxing. Many periodically take on full-time factory jobs when necessary. According to researcher Yihang Wu this reflects a wider trend of the precariat—a class characterised by unstable, precarious work.

== Lifestyle and ethos ==
The Sanhe Gods' slogan is "Work one day, play three days" actively practicing the "lying flat" philosophy. Many are in debt, have sold their ID numbers for 50 to 100 RMB on the black market to people wanting to register fraudulent companies, or have obtained online fraudulent loans and cannot afford the fare home. Thus, with low economic and social capital, they try to live in the present and survive with a minimum amount of money.

They are mainly daily labourers, so they queue around the Sanhe Talent Market applying for jobs that pay them by the end of the day, so that they may earn some quick cash. They believe that daily work is a protection for their labor because they can quit at any time if they are dissatisfied or treated unfairly. Once paid, they spend the next couple of days indulging in online video games or online gambling, until they run out of money and have to hunt for jobs again. Through this time a lot of them sleep on internet cafes, where gaming and sleeping facilities are provided night and day, and survive through instant noodles and cheap bottles of water. Their consumption habits consist of keeping their living expenses to an absolute minimum. When they have no money for food, often they sleep on the streets and survive for a few days on two RMB, then apply for a job.

This social group is mainly composed by single, unmarried men with fragile and transient friendships and a strong online presence. Most of the people come from backgrounds where they have cut relations with their previous friends and bond over other people in their same situation normally through common hobbies and desperation, but friends can be a source of scams, so people need to keep their guard up. Moreover, many Sanhe Gods cannot go back to their previous households as since they have not secured a steady job or found a partner they would be regarded as failures by their families and would not be accepted.

== Social media impact ==
Chinese social media has played a central role in shaping the identity of the Sanhe Gods, turning a marginal group of unemployed migrant youth in Shenzhen into a recognizable online subculture. Platforms such as Baidu Tieba, Weibo, and Bilibili provide spaces where these young men share stories of precarious work, poverty, and alienation, often using humour and irony as coping mechanisms. Within these digital communities, the Sanhe Gods construct a unique subculture that rejects China's mainstream work mode and consumerism, embracing instead a lifestyle defined by minimal survival and self-mockery. Their message captures an ironic defiance of the country's 996 culture and neoliberal ideals of constant productivity.

A key symbol of this online identity is "guabi", literally "to hang oneself" which has evolved from gaming slang into a term describing those who spend all their daily wages and return to poverty. It expresses frustration, exhaustion, and solidarity among precarious youth who cannot escape unstable labour markets. In online forums, "guabi" becomes a form of performative resistance: by embracing failure, young men turn shame into collective humour and symbolic rebellion against capitalist work norms. On Baidu Tieba, users who identify as "guabi" often post seeking help from other Sanhe Gods, illustrating how digital networks foster solidarity among precarious youth.

According to anthropologist Xinyuan Wang, this digital self-expression remains deeply gendered. In Sanhe's social environment, women are rarely visible and often morally scrutinised when they appear. The few who stay in the area are usually formal residents or small-business employees, while young women who wander the streets are quickly labelled "guabi women," implying desperation and moral decline. Male Sanhe workers, by contrast, use terms such as "diaomao" ("worthless guy") and "laoge" ("old brother") to express camaraderie and ironic masculinity. Researcher Ding Tianyu observes that young people in Sanhe "do not need to worry about unemployment, marriage or family," reflecting a masculine freedom detached from domestic expectations—one reason why so few Sanhe Gods are women. Researcher Ying Zhou argues that China's market reforms have produced a precarious labour force trapped in unstable, low-paid jobs. This broader condition of precarity supports the subculture of Sanhe Gods: while social media gives these youth visibility and symbolic voice, it also reproduces the same class and gender hierarchies embedded in China's unequal labour system.

== State response ==
=== Policy and institutional responses ===
In 2017, Shenzhen's Longhua District government launched a "Hundred-Day Rectification Campaign" to address the disorder surrounding the Sanhe Talent Market. The campaign was a multi-departmental enforcement effort, involving local police, urban management, and labour departments. Officials set up an on-site office in the Sanhe Market to coordinate the crackdown. According to a report in The Paper, authorities targeted illegal job agencies (referred to as "black intermediaries"), fraudulent recruiters, petty crime, gambling, and poor housing conditions in the area. During the campaign, 35 criminal cases were solved, 54 people were criminally detained, and 35 others received administrative penalties. The authorities claimed that public security incidents dropped by 26.9%, theft cases by 50%, and that the overall environment around Sanhe improved significantly. In addition to policing, the local government closed or renovated low-cost rental housing and internet cafés, removed unlicensed businesses, and launched infrastructure upgrades such as paving alleys, installing underground pipelines, and improving sanitation. Officials stated that the aim was not to "expel" residents but to "standardize management" and "compress the survival space of idlers."

=== Media responses ===
When reports about the "Sanhe Gods" spread widely online, Chinese authorities quickly moved to contain negative portrayals that might challenge the official image of national prosperity or inspire social pessimism. State-owned media such as People's Daily and CCTV reframed the discourse around the "Sanhe Gods" in several ways. They were depoliticised as the phenomenon was presented as an individual issue of moral weakness or lack of ambition, rather than a symptom of societal structural inequality. In contrast, media outlets highlighted stories of self-reliant workers and successful migrants to promote the value of "striving" (奋斗) and "positive energy" (正能量). However, censorship and online regulation were also used by the State: videos, documentaries, and live streams romanticising "Sanhe" lifestyles were removed from platforms such as Douyin and Bilibili. The government aimed to prevent the emergence of a "lying-flat" subculture that could undermine work ethics or social discipline. In 2018, the Japanese public broadcaster NHK produced a documentary about the "Sanhe Gods" which is banned from being broadcast on all platforms.

== Evolution of the Sanhe Gods ==
The "Sanhe Gods" phenomenon, once concentrated in Shenzhen's Sanhe labour market, has evolved but not disappeared. The Talent Market was replaced with Striver's Square during the COVID-19 pandemic and this marginalized group of young, precarious workers has become more dispersed and less visible. However, their condition of instability and exclusion remains a persistent feature of China's urban economy. Beginning in 2018 and especially since 2021, the Jingle area where many Sanhe Gods lived has been gentrified: buildings have been renovated and rents have increased, leaving no place for the Sanhe Gods there or in the surrounding areas of Shenzhen.

In many Chinese cities, urban redevelopment projects have displaced informal labour hubs, pushing populations like the Sanhe Gods into new spaces. Industrial zones like Kunshan China Garden and Wuxi Chunchao Road have become new centres for migrant workers. On Weibo, many posts invite "brothers" to the new urban villages as large number of workers are needed to staff the production lines of their electronics plants. Some keep moving in order to maintain their unstable lifestyle of temporary work, yet many former "Sanhe Gods" do not, and return to steadier but low-paid jobs.

In the digital era, the "Sanhe" identity has shifted from a physical community to a symbolic subculture. According to China Digital Times, online users and vloggers now use the label "Sanhe God" ironically to express resistance against social pressure and the myth of success, reflecting a broader sense of alienation among China's working youth.
