= Dirk Dressler =

German neurologist and psychiatrist

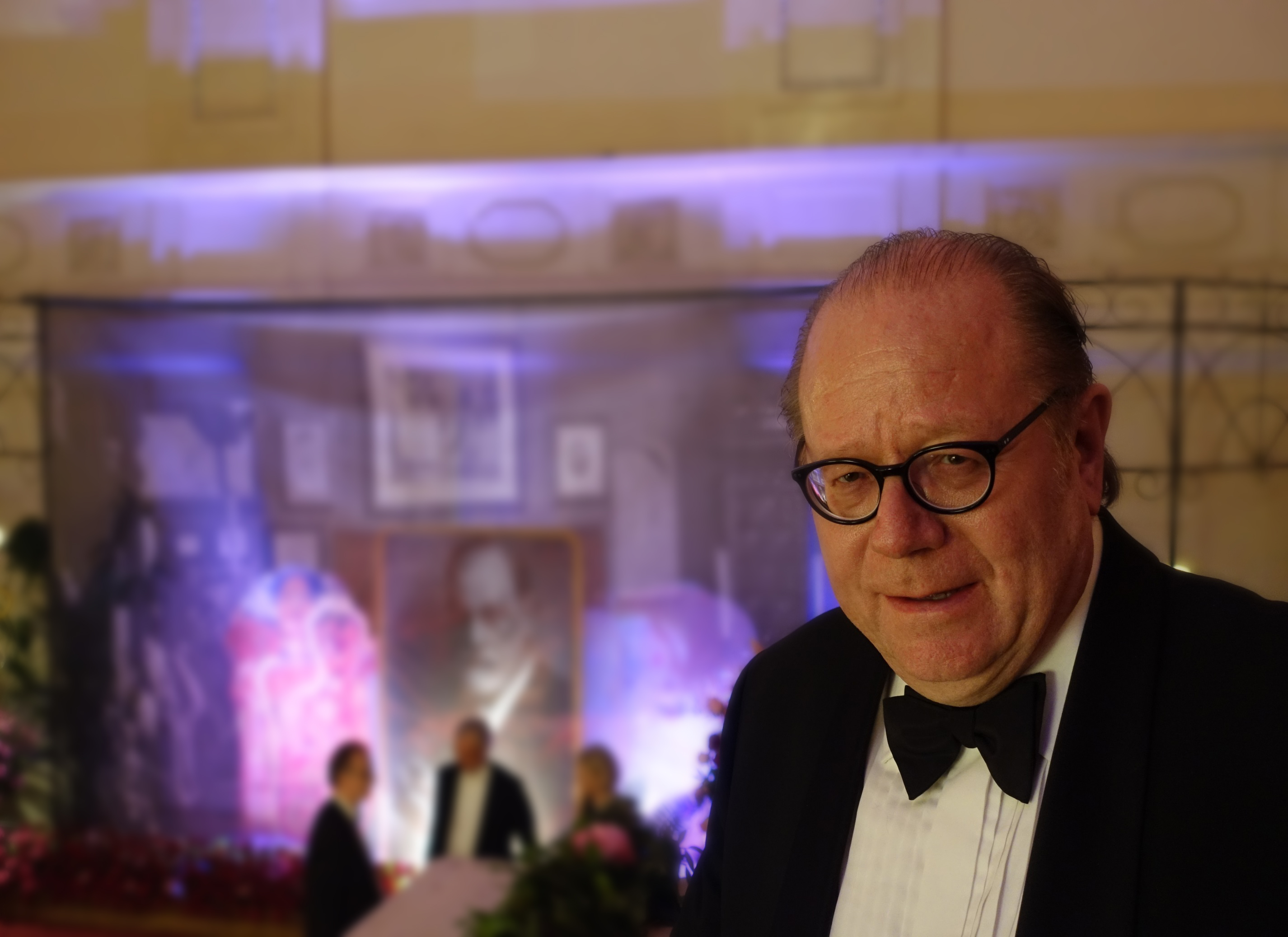
Dressler in 2020

Konrad Karl Erich Bodo Wilhelm Dirk Dressler (born 19 July 1958) is a German neurologist and psychiatrist. He is Full Professor of Neurology at Hannover Medical School. His research focus is neurological movement disorders and the development and introduction of the botulinum toxin therapy.

== Education ==
Dirk Dressler studied medicine and philosophy with a scholarship of Konrad-Adenauer-Foundation at Georg-August University, Goettingen and Harvard Medical School, Boston. Subsequently, he specialised as neurologist and psychiatrist at Georg-August University, Goettingen and Friedrich-Alexander University, Erlangen. He is a board-certified neurologist and psychiatrist in Germany and the United Kingdom.

== Work ==
After several years of postgraduate training at the National Hospital for Neurology and the Institute of Neurology, Queen Square, London, UK he took over a position as consultant neurologist and associate professor of neurology at Rostock University, Rostock, Germany. 2004 he received his venia legendi with the habilitation thesis Antibody-induced Botulinum Toxin Therapy Failure: Symptoms, Evaluation, Treatment. 2008 he was appointed full professor of neurology and head of movement disorders section at the department of neurology, Hannover Medical School, Hannover, Germany.

His main interest covers clinical, pharmacological, neurophysiological, imaging and genetic studies of central motor control and movement disorders. His special interest is dystonia and spasticity. He is one of the pioneers of botulinum toxin therapy in Europe. He is author of numerous scientific publications on botulinum toxin therapy. He received several awards, teaches at several foreign universities and holds patents on botulinum toxin therapy.

Dressler is co-founder and co-convenor of International Congress on Treatment of Dystonia, co-founder of International Neurotoxin Association and IAB - Interdisciplinary Working Group for Movement Disorders, International Parkinson and Movement Disorder Society Special Interest Group on Spasticity, of Konrad Adenauer Foundation Health Network, of Fokus Spastik/German Spasticity Forum. He was long-term Co-Director of We Move, Inc, New York.

== Selected publications ==
Dressler published (as of 12/2019) 249 scientific articles with PubMed listing, 58 book chapters and 12 scientific monographies. Additionally, he produced more than 15 scientific films.

Selected Monographies:

- Botulinum-Toxin-Therapie. Thieme, Stuttgart 1995
- Botulinum Toxin Therapy. Thieme Verlag, Stuttgart, New York 2000
- Antikörperinduziertes Botulinum Toxin-Therapieversagen: Symptomatik, Abklärung, Behandlung. Hoffmann-Verlag, Mainz 2005
- Manual of Botulinum Toxin Therapy. 2nd Edition. Cambridge University Press, Cambridge 2013 (together with D. Truong, M. Hallett and C. Zachary)
- Treatment of Dystonia. Cambridge University Press, Cambridge, UK 2018 (together with E. Altenmüller and J.K. Krauss)

== Awards ==
- University of Santiago, Chile: honorary professorship
- Chinese Botulinum Toxin Society: Lifetime Award
- Symtox - Latin American Botulinum Toxin Association: Lifetime Award

== Visiting professorships ==
- University of São Paulo, São Paulo, Brazil
- University of Monterrey, Monterrey, Mexico
- Tongji University School of Medicine, Shanghai, China
- First Moscow State Medical University, Moscow, Russia
