= Living Alone =

Living Alone may refer to:

- Reclusiveness, living alone in social isolation
- Singleton (lifestyle), a household with one person, without the connotation of social isolation
- "Living Alone" (song), a song by John Mayall & the Bluesbreakers from the album A Hard Road
- Living Alone (EP), by Teddy Geiger

== See also ==
- "Tanha Tanha Yahan Pe Jeena" (lit. 'Living Alone Here'), a song by A. R. Rahman and Asha Bhosle from the 1999 Indian film Rangeela
