= Shanghai Pulmonary Hospital =

Hospital in Shanghai, China

Shanghai Pulmonary Hospital (Chinese: 上海市肺科醫院), full name "Shanghai Pulmonary Hospital Affiliated to Tongji University", also called "Shanghai Institute of Occupational Disease Prevention and Treatment", is a lung disease specialized hospital located in Shanghai of China. Founded in 1933 nicknamed the "Ye Family Garden", the hospital has developed into a Grade A tertiary hospital integrating medical treatment, teaching and scientific research. The hospital is ranked 2nd in Pulmonology and 3rd in Thoracic Surgery nationally by the Fudan Ranking.

== History ==
In the 1930s, tuberculosis was rampant in China, but there was no tuberculosis hospital in Shanghai at that time. Yan Fuqing, the president of the National Shanghai Medical College, made great efforts to raise funds from all sectors of society. In February 1933, Ye Ziheng (son of Ye Chengzhong) donated his private garden, the Ye Family Garden, to the Shanghai Medical College to establish a hospital dedicated to treating pulmonary patients. On June 15, 1933, the Chengzhong Hospital was established, which was the Second Internship Hospital of the Shanghai Medical College, with Yan Fuqing as its first president.

In April 1934, the China Charity Association added wards to the hospital, making it the first pulmonary sanatorium specifically for children in China. The hospital was later occupied by the Japanese and taken back by Shanghai Medical College after the end of the Anti-Japanese War.

In November 1950, the hospital was placed under the leadership of the Shanghai Municipal Health Bureau and renamed "Shanghai Municipal Chengzhong Tuberculosis Prevention and Treatment Hospital".

In October 1957, the hospital was renamed "Shanghai Municipal Tuberculosis Prevention and Treatment Hospital".

In April 1958, the hospital was renamed "Shanghai First Tuberculosis Prevention and Treatment Hospital".

In June 1964, the hospital successfully performed lung resection surgery under acupuncture anesthesia for the first time, thus becoming the earliest clinical research unit in China to carry out acupuncture anesthesia surgery.

In November 1984, the hospital was renamed "Shanghai Tuberculosis Prevention and Control Center".

In December 1989, the hospital was renamed "Shanghai First Pulmonary Hospital".

In 1995, the hospital was rated as one of the first batch of "Grade A tertiary hospitals" in the country.

In December 1998, the hospital was renamed "Shanghai Pulmonary Hospital" (Shanghai Occupational Disease Hospital).

In late 2002, the hospital successfully conducted the first lung transplant for a senior patient in Asia. It also drafted and formulated the “Technical Protocol for Clinical Lung Transplantation.”

In March 2005, the third name "Shanghai Pulmonary Hospital Affiliated to Tongji University" was added.

In September 2013, the second name was changed from Shanghai Occupational Disease Hospital to "Shanghai Occupational Disease Prevention and Treatment Hospital". In the same year, Spanish doctor Diego González Rivas (the world's first surgeon to perform single-port thoracoscopic surgery) came to Shanghai Pulmonary Hospital as a teacher to instruct doctors on single-port thoracoscopic surgery. At that time, four doctors from the Department of Thoracic Surgery at Shanghai Pulmonary Hospital jointly performed the first single-port thoracoscopic surgery in China. Later, Shanghai Pulmonary Hospital became a global center for the promotion of single-port thoracoscopic surgery. From 2014 to 2016, nearly 300 surgeons from the United States, Spain, Germany, the Netherlands, Russia, Israel, and other countries attended two-week "single-port thoracoscopic" surgery training courses or several-month-long general thoracic surgery training courses at Shanghai Pulmonary Hospital at their own expense.

In 2019, the hospital was awarded the second prize of the National Science and Technology Progress Award for advances in lung cancer precision diagnosis.

== Current situation ==
The hospital covers an area of 101,000 square meters, with a building area of 126,000 square meters. There are over 1,000 beds. The hospital handles more than 1 million outpatient visits and performs 15,000 thoracic operations annually. Services for international patients are also available.

As a hospital affiliated to the medical school of Tongji University, the hospital is also responsible for teaching and training of students and doctors from China and broad.

In academic research, the hospital published 58 papers listed in Nature Index for the Time frame of 1 April 2025 - 31 March 2026, ranking 130th globally and 53rd in China in healthcare.

In the Fudan Ranking, the hospital is in Top 60 (A++) among 35,000+ hospitals in China Nationally, ranking 2nd in Tuberculosis and 3rd in Thoracic Surgery.

The hospital is China's oldest and most established pulmonary specialty hospital. There are four National Clinical Key Specialty areas: Thoracic Surgery, Oncology, Respiratory Medicine, and Occupational Disease.

Hospital Address: No. 507 Zhengmin Road, Yangpu District, Shanghai, China.

== See aso ==
- Tongji University School of Medicine
- Shanghai Chest Hospital
- List of hospitals in China
