= Zhou Liqi =

Chinese slacker culture influencer

Zhou Liqi (Chinese: 周立齐; born December 27, 1984) is a Chinese slacker culture influencer. He became famous in 2016 after a 2012 video went viral of him being questioned by local police in Guangxi after being arrested for stealing electric bicycles. When he was released from prison in April 2020, he was offered up to CN¥3 million to sign with talent agents, but he declined the offers, instead opening a barbecue restaurant. The Chinese government has criticized him as part of an effort to suppress slacker culture, censored fan videos praising him using the nickname Qie Guevara (Chinese: 窃·格瓦拉; lit. 'Steal Guevara'), and threatened to blacklist talent agencies that work with him.
