= Satori generation =

Japanese neologism

Population of Japan by generation

Satori generation (さとり世代, Satori sedai) is a Japanese-language neologism used to describe young Japanese who have seemingly achieved the Buddhist enlightened state free from material desires but who have in reality given up ambition and hope due to macro-economic trends. The term was coined around 2010, and generally refers to Japanese people born between 1987 and 2003 in the midst of the Lost Decades. The generation is also known as Shinjinrui Junior (新人類ジュニア世代, Shin jinrui junia sedai).

The Satori generation are not interested in earning money, career advancement, conspicuous consumption, or even travel, hobbies and romantic relationships; their alcohol consumption is far lower than Japanese of earlier generations. They live in a period of waithood and are NEETs, parasite singles, freeters or hikikomori.

The Satori generation in Japan share characteristics with the N-po generation in South Korea, and the Tang ping (躺平 'lying flat') phenomenon in China.

Satori means the experience of awakening ("enlightenment") or apprehension of the true nature of reality.

== See also ==
- Shinjinrui
- 9X Generation, Vietnam
- Buddha-like mindset, China
- N-po generation, Korea
  - 4B movement, Korea
- Tang ping, China
- Gen Z
- Strawberry generation

General:

- NEET
- Sexual abstinence
- Singleton (lifestyle)
- Voluntary childlessness
