= Slacker =

Person who habitually avoids work or lacks work ethic

Slackers usually do sedentary activities such as using a mobile phone instead of doing work, as shown in this illustration

A slacker is someone who habitually avoids work or lacks work ethic.

== Origin ==
According to different sources, the term "slacker" dates back to about 1790 or 1898. "Slacker" gained some recognition during the British Gezira Scheme in the early to mid-20th century, when Sudanese labourers protested their relative powerlessness by working lethargically, a form of protest known as "slacking".

== World Wars ==
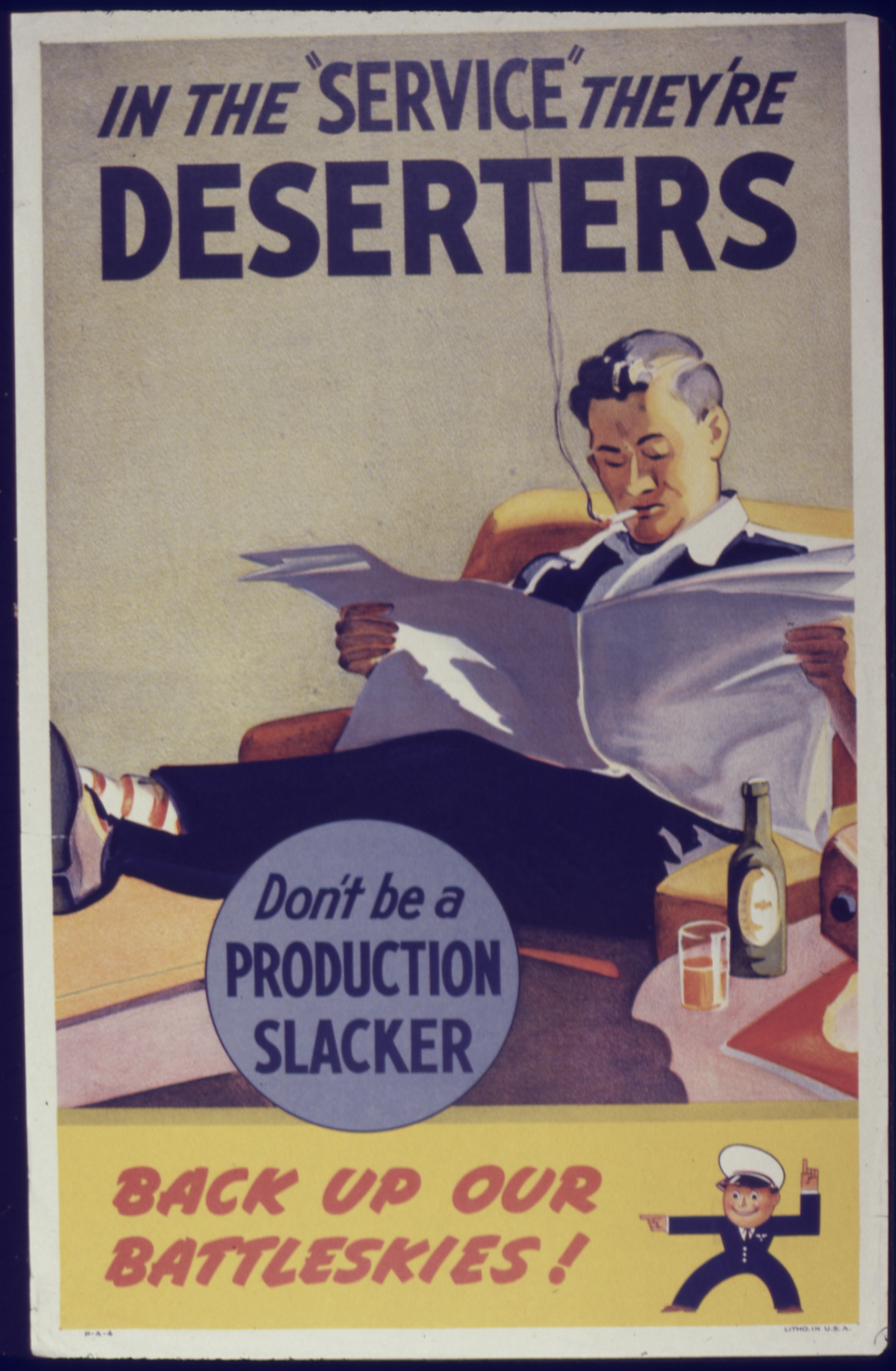
A 1942 US War Production Board propaganda poster equates slacking in the workplace to desertion.

In the United States during World War I, the word "slacker" was commonly used to describe someone who was not participating in the war effort, specifically someone who avoided military service, equivalent to the later term "draft dodger". Attempts to track down such evaders were called "slacker raids".

During World War I, U.S. Senator Miles Poindexter discussed whether inquiries "to separate the cowards and the slackers from those who had not violated the draft" had been managed properly. A San Francisco Chronicle headline on 7 September 1918, read, "Slacker Is Doused in Barrel of Paint".

The term was also used during the World War II period in the United States. In 1940, Time quoted the U.S. Army on managing the military draft efficiently: "War is not going to wait while every slacker resorts to endless appeals."

== Evolution ==
The shift in the use of "slacker" from its draft-related meaning to a more general sense of the avoidance of work is unclear. In April 1948, The New Republic referred to "resentment against taxes levied to aid slackers". An article tracking the evolution of the meaning of the term "Slacker" in defamation lawsuits between World War I and 2010, entitled When Slacker Was a Dirty Word: Defamation and Draft Dodging During World War I, was written by Attorney David Kluft for the Trademark and Copyright Law Blog.

== Late 20th century and onward ==
The term achieved renewed popularity following its use in the 1985 film Back to the Future in which James Tolkan's character Mr. Strickland chronically refers to Marty McFly, his father George McFly, Biff Tannen, and a group of teenaged delinquents as "slackers". It gained subsequent exposure from the Superchunk single "Slack Motherfucker" and the film Slacker, both released in 1990. The television series Rox has been noted for its "depiction of the slacker lifestyle ... of the early '90s".

"Slacker" became widely used in the 1990s to refer to a type of apathetic youth who were cynical and uninterested in political or social causes. This type became a stereotype for members of Generation X. Richard Linklater, director of the aforementioned 1990 film, commented on the term's meaning in a 1993 interview, stating that "I think the cheapest definition [of a slacker] would be someone who's just lazy, hangin' out, doing nothing. I'd like to change that to somebody who's not doing what's expected of them. Somebody who's trying to live an interesting life, doing what they want to do, and if that takes time to find, so be it."

The term has connotations of "apathy and aimlessness". It is also used to refer to an educated person who avoids work, possibly as an antimaterialist stance, who may be viewed as an underachiever.

"Slackers" have been the subject of many films and television shows, particularly comedies. Notable examples include the films Slacker, Slackers, Clerks, SubUrbia, Metal Skin, Hot Tub Time Machine, Bio-Dome, You, Me and Dupree, Bachelor Party, Stripes, Withnail and I, The Big Lebowski, Old School, Ferris Bueller's Day Off, Trainspotting, Animal House, and Bill and Ted, as well as the television shows Freaks and Geeks, Spaced, The Royle Family, and Regular Show.

The Idler, a British magazine founded in 1993, represents an alternative to contemporary society's work ethic and aims "to return dignity to the art of loafing".

== See also ==
- Buddha-like mindset, Chinese term for people who reject the rat race
- Freeter
- Goldbricking, cyberslacking
- Goofing off, engaging in idle pastime while obligations are neglected
- Hikikomori, Japanese term for withdrawal from social life
- NEET
- Slacktivism
- Slacker rock
- Tang ping ("lying flat")
