= Slack Motherfucker =

Single by Superchunk

from the album Superchunk
- B-side: "Night Creatures"
- Released: April 1, 1990
- Recorded: January 18–19, 1990
- Studio: Duck Kee Studios (Raleigh, North Carolina)
- Genre: Indie rock; power pop; pop-punk; lo-fi; noise pop
- Length: 2:52
- Label: Merge
- Songwriters: Mac McCaughan; Laura Ballance; Chuck Garrison; Jack McCook

Superchunk singles chronology
"What Do I" (1989)	"Slack Motherfucker" (1990)	"Tower" (1991)

"Slack Motherfucker" is a song by the American rock band Superchunk. It was the first single released from the band's debut, self-titled album (1990). The song was penned by vocalist and guitarist Mac McCaughan in reference to an indolent co-worker he had at the time. Credited to all four band members, it was the band's second single and first to be released under the name Superchunk.

Issued as a 7-inch single in April 1990, "Slack Motherfucker" rapidly became one of the band's best-known songs. It has been credited with popularizing the "slacker" stereotype, and as a blueprint for future indie rock music.

== Background ==
McCaughan wrote the song based on a lazy co-worker he worked with while on the night shift at the Kinko's, now a FedEx Office, located on Franklin Street in downtown Chapel Hill, North Carolina. Chuck Garrison, the band's first drummer, has claimed the song was written about him, though McCaughan has maintained the song was based on a co-worker. Alex Denney of The Guardian summarizes the song's content: "a disgruntled employee accuse his boss of slacking off on the job in the strongest possible terms." Musically, the song has been described as indie rock, power pop, pop-punk, lo-fi, and noise pop.

Peter Margasak, in the Chicago Reader, describes it as a "low-rent self-empowerment anthem."

== Reception ==
"Slack Motherfucker" was issued as a 7-inch single in April 1990; it quickly sold out of its original pressing of 1,000 copies. Then-guitarist Jack McCook painted the artwork for the sleeve. The band's first single was credited under the name Chunk; "Slack Motherfucker" was the first to use the band's new name. The song was a success on college radio, with programmers typically airing it past midnight to avoid obscenity laws. The song has widely been considered among the band's best and most well-known songs. Kyle Ryan at The A.V. Club called it "one of the most beloved Superchunk songs ever." Jason Ankeny of AllMusic called it the band's "most celebrated moment," describing it as "a "note-perfect snapshot of minimum-wage angst and attitude."

Timothy Bracy And Elizabeth Bracy, in a piece for Stereogum, write that the song later found a larger audience when included on Tossing Seeds (Singles 89–91), the band's 1991 album compiling a number of their earliest 7" singles and EPs.

== Legacy ==
Cam Lindsay for Vice Media writes that the song is "one of a few cultural moments in time that helped popularise slacker culture, which would later run rampant as a stereotype in indie rock." Will Hermes, in a blog for radio station WBUR-FM, wrote that the song "defined the sound and the ethos of indie rock." Ana Marie Cox from Spin said that the song "resonated with recently educated cynics as just the thing to play too loudly on your parents' stereo that first summer home from college." David Sackllah, writing for Consequence of Sound, ranked it among the best debut singles ever by an artist, observing, "The song's wry energy was antithetical to the "slacker" generation that reigned in the '90s, even if they shared a title in common. This was a brilliant punch of furious determination that has never lost relevance in the years since." Denney of The Guardian included it among his top five list of Generation X anthems. "Slack Motherfucker" was named one of the best songs of the '90s by Rolling Stone, the 19th best single of the 1990s by Spin, and the 81st best song of the 1990s by Pitchfork.

For a brief time period in the 1990s, the band ceased live performances of the song, as they were tiring of it. Ballance has said "if I never hear "Slack Motherfucker" again in my life I will be a happy camper. I am so over that song. It's so stupid and juvenile." The band resumed playing the song later in their career. McCaughan spoke about the song's legacy in an interview with The A.V. Club:

It's always fun. I think if it wasn't fun to play, or if it was one of those songs that doesn't really work live, we wouldn't still be playing it. [Laughs] I think it so long ago transcended whatever it was about and it's more like a fun song to play and sing along to. People just enjoy swearing out loud—that's one thing. [Laughs] "Motherfucker" is a very satisfying word to say.
