= Economic inequality in China =

Since the turn of the millennium, China has become the fastest growing economy in the world. This growth resulted in significant improvements in real living standards and reduction in poverty rates. The World Bank estimates that more than 60% of the population lived below the poverty line of $1 per day (PPP) at the start of the reform and opening up. By 2004, poverty had fallen to 10 percent, suggesting that approximately 500 million people had been lifted out of poverty in one generation. At the same time, the pace of change has brought mixed results. China faces serious natural resource shortages and environmental problems. As people live in different areas, the differences between types grow.

In the past decade or so, China's Gini coefficient has generally been fluctuating and declining. After reaching its highest point of 0.491 in 2008, the Gini coefficient of the national per capita disposable income has shown a fluctuating downward trend since 2009. It dropped to 0.468 in 2020, with a cumulative decrease of 0.023. At the same time, the adjustment of residents' income distribution is increasing. During the "Thirteenth Five-Year Plan" period, the average annual net transfer income per capita of residents across the country increased by 10.1%, faster than the growth of overall residents' income.

China's Gini index of economic inequality

== Current situation ==
China's economy has shifted from high-speed growth to medium-to-high-speed growth. Economic development has always been in a state of relative agglomeration, and the economic development pattern shows the evolutionary characteristics of "balanced-unbalanced-gradual equilibrium". Economic development shows an obvious overall trend of advancing from coastal to inland areas, and China's economy is developing in a balanced way from cities to rural areas.

== Causes ==
Inequality in China can be largely attributed to collective factors, which means that many of the current inequalities in China are not at the individual level, but at the collective level. Traditional political ideology promotes merit-based inequality. Official propaganda emphasizes that economic development requires some people to get rich first, and the resulting inequality is the price this society pays for development.

China's traditional political consciousness promotes inequality based on performance. In real life, people in leadership positions are often given more privileges and conveniences. If privileges are given to the upper class, it will benefit their subordinates or other people in society. So this kind of inequality is recognized and encouraged in China's traditional ideological system. This inequality makes China's economy unequal.

== Manifestations ==
=== Large gap between urban and rural areas ===
China is one of the countries with the largest income gap between urban and rural households. The urban-rural income gap increased as a proportion of total income inequality by 10% between 1995 and 2007, rising from 38% to 48%. According to data from the National Bureau of Statistics of China, as of 2021, the gap in per capita disposable income between urban and rural residents in China is 2.57 times, and the income level of urban residents is significantly higher than that of rural residents. The economic development and industrial structure of urban areas are more modern, while the development of rural areas is relatively backward and the industrial structure is relatively single. This is one of the reasons why the gap between urban and rural areas is gradually widening.

=== Wide income gap ===
The average income growth level of high-income groups is significantly faster than that of low-income groups. The income of the richest segment of society is 25 times that of the poorest segment. In addition, data on high-income households have not been fully released, and many gray incomes (including bribery and corruption) have not been calculated.

=== Wealth imbalance ===
According to estimates by Sato et al. (2011), housing accounts for nearly 60% of household wealth, and two-thirds of wealth inequality comes from the gap in housing wealth. Housing wealth per urban household was 4.5 times that of rural households in 2002, and by 2007 it had increased to 7.2 times. This gap is wider than the urban-rural income gap.

== The impact of income inequality on people ==
Although personal income is always positively related to life satisfaction, the effect is weaker in wealthy areas than in poor areas. As Brockman et al. et al. (2009) argue that the rapid increase in income inequality in China may produce a group of "frustrated achievers" whose incomes are on a downward trend despite significant increases in their incomes, judging from big data, leading to life satisfaction degree dropped. Even highly educated city dwellers can largely be seen as economic winners. In 2008, China's income inequality increased again, and people began to express their dissatisfaction with society, which manifested itself in threats, strikes, civil unrest, and criminal behavior.

== See also ==
- Economic inequality in South Korea
- Economic inequality in the United States
