= Strawberry generation =

Taiwanese neologism for sensitive people

Strawberry generation (Chinese: 草莓族; pinyin: Cǎoméi zú; or 草莓世代; cǎoméi shìdài) is a pejorative neologism used in Taiwan for Taiwanese people born from the 1990s onwards who "bruise easily" like strawberries – meaning they cannot withstand social pressure, or work hard like their parents' generation; the term refers to people who are perceived as insubordinate, spoiled, selfish, arrogant, and sluggish in work.

The term arises from the perception that members of this generation have grown up being overprotected by their parents and in an environment of stability, in a similar manner to how strawberries are grown in protected greenhouses and command a higher price compared to other fruits. The term gained prominence in the Taiwanese press, as it could be a way to designate a rising demographic or psychographic in terms of consumer behavior.

Worsened working conditions, low wages, and low career achievement with high academic degrees -- These have become a common pain among the youth in Taiwan. They lose their will to seek their dream and submit to reality, but defamation and discrimination are still against them by society. Age seems like a sin in a career, and an excuse for employers to exploit their employees. Tell me, what kind of fairness behind these?

— Zang Shengyuan

Young people in Taiwan usually express their dislike of the term. In a 2012 survey, the term was the most hated label among the youth. Some youth criticize the term as an excuse for not improving working conditions, and ignoring intergenerational equity in Taiwan.

== Ironic usage ==
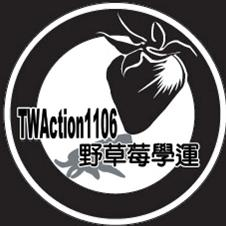
The official logo of the Wild Strawberries Movement

In an ironic reference to the term, a 2008 student-led political movement in Taiwan started the Wild Strawberries Movement. This movement was in response to the visit of China's Association for Relations Across the Taiwan Strait (ARATS) chairman Chen Yunlin to the island. Police actions on protests aimed at Chen suppressed the display of Taiwan's national flag and the playing of Taiwanese songs. This prompted a group of 400 students in Taipei, Taiwan, to begin a sit-in in front of the Executive Yuan in protest of Taiwan's Parade and Assembly Law (Chinese: 集會遊行法).

== See also ==
- Gen Z
- 9X Generation
- Buddha-like mindset
- Helicopter parent
- Hothousing
- Kiasi
- Mazhory
- Kyoiku mama
- N-po generation
- Satori generation
- Snowflake (slang)
- Tang ping
- Fresa
