= 996 working hour system =

Overtime work schedule from China

- Chinese: 996工作制
Transcriptions
Standard Mandarin
- Hanyu Pinyin: jiǔjiǔliù gōngzuò zhì

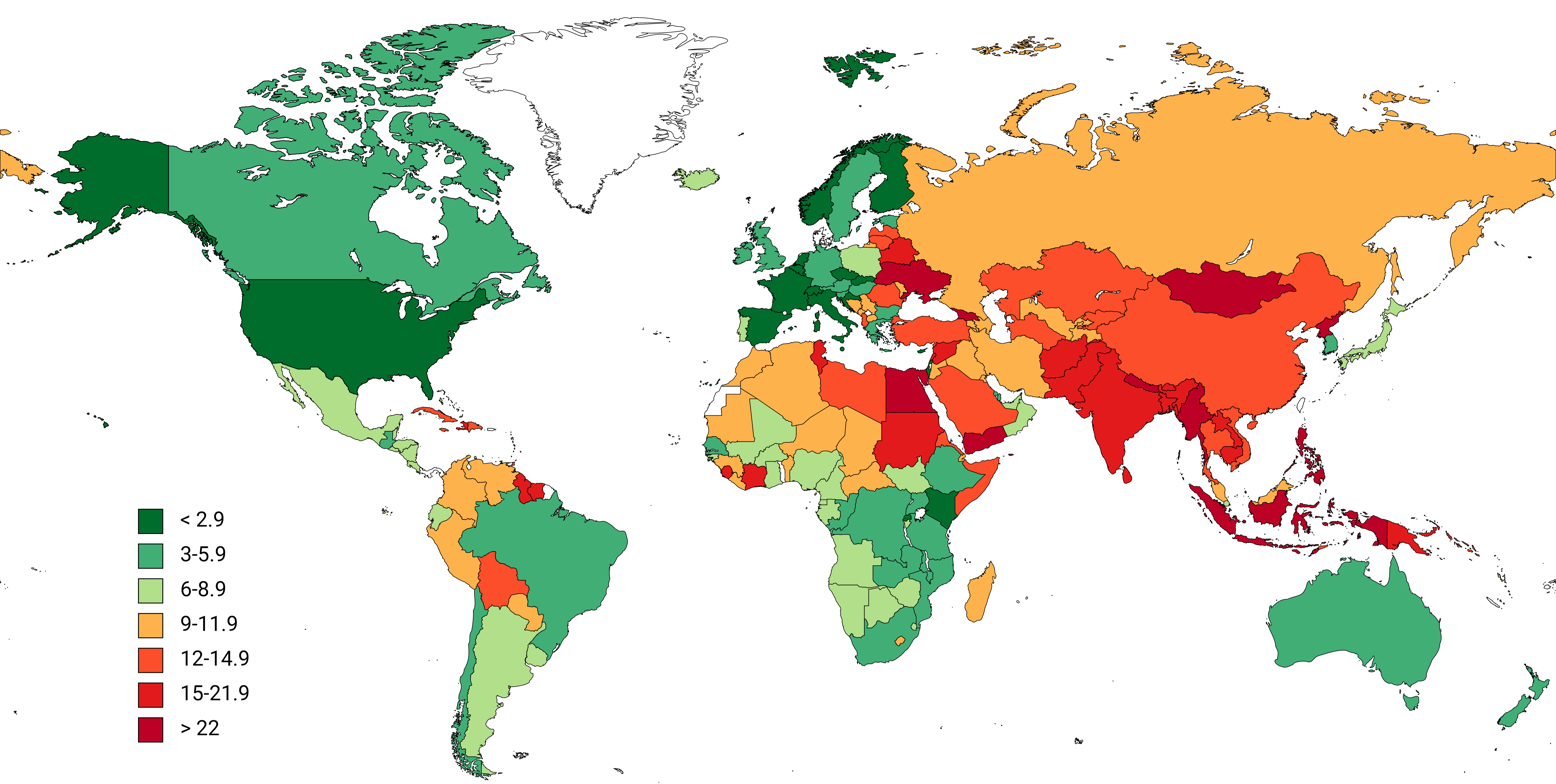
Deaths due to long working hours per 100,000 people (15+), joint study conducted by World Health Organization and International Labour Organization in 2016

The 996 working hour system (Chinese: 996工作制) is a work schedule that derives its name from its requirement that workers clock in from 9:00 am to 9:00 pm, 6 days per week, resulting in employees working 12 hours per day and 72 hours per week. It is practiced illegally by some companies in China. A number of mainland Chinese internet and tech companies have adopted this system as their official or de facto work schedule. Critics argue that the 996 working hour system is a violation of the Labour Law of the People's Republic of China and have called it "modern slavery".

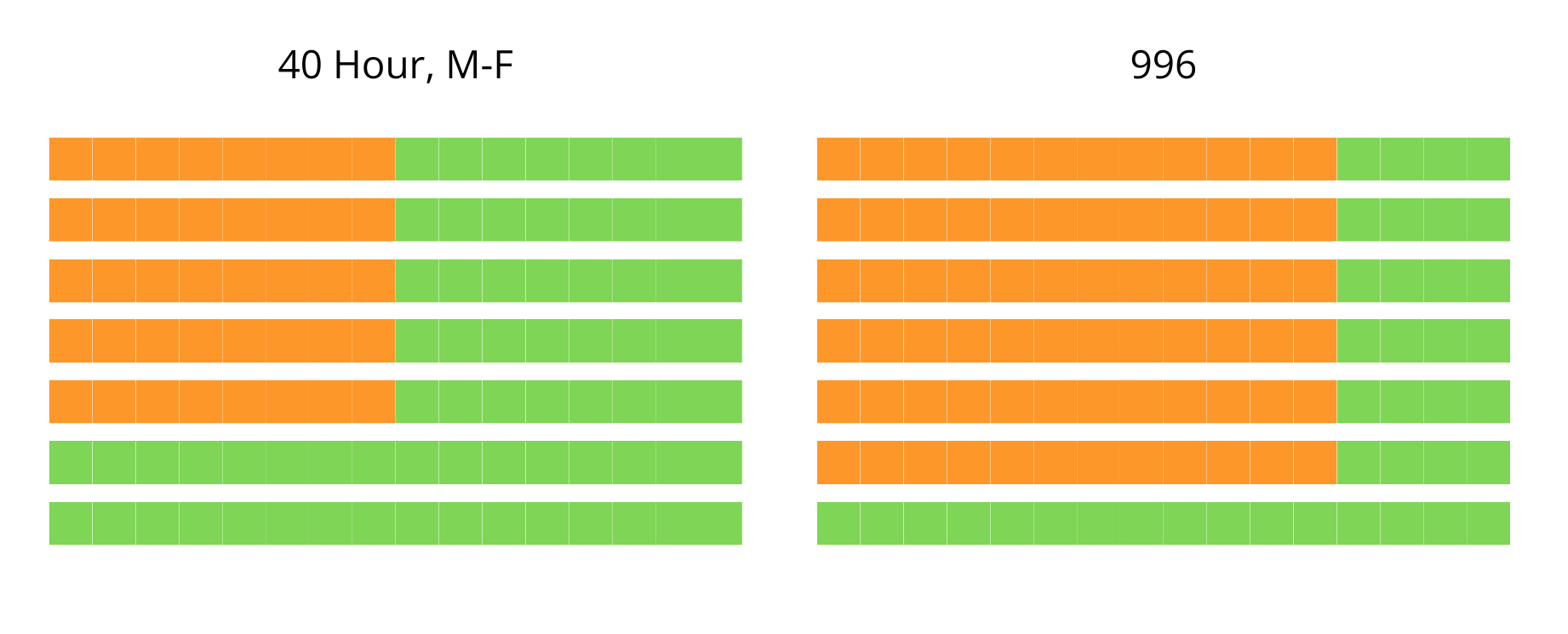
Difference in working hours (orange) during waking hours between a typical 9 to 5 and the 996 schedule

In March 2019, an "anti-996" protest was launched via GitHub. Since then, the 996 issue has been met with growing discontent in China.

In 2025, the practice began to show up among US tech firms, especially startups, in relation to the AI boom. This includes OpenAI, Anthropic, and X Corp..

== Background ==
The culture of overtime work has a long history in Chinese IT companies, where the focus is typically on speed and cost reduction. Companies employ a range of measures, such as reimbursing taxi fares for employees who remain working at the office late into the night, to incentivize overtime work.

This system of working for long hours with few breaks has been known to increase the occurrence of mental and physical problems seen in workers. It is estimated that more than three-quarters of urban workers in big cities like Beijing, Shanghai, and Guangzhou suffer from work-related fatigue, musculoskeletal pain, sleep disorders or eating disorders, occupational stress, and work–family imbalance. According to China's state-owned People's Daily, a 2013 survey showed that 98.8% of Chinese IT industry workers reported health problems. Numerous overwork deaths and suicides have occurred during past decades due to the 996 system and other overtime work systems in China.

In 2020, a study published in IEEE Software done by Chinese researchers found that "Chinese businesses are more likely to follow long work hours than American ones". Another study likened 996 culture to "modern slavery", formed through the combination of "unrestricted global capitalism and a Confucian culture of hierarchy and obedience".

== Companies involved ==
=== 58.com ===
In September 2016, the classified advertising website 58.com officially declared its adoption of the 996 working hour system, attracting criticism from employees and social commentators. The company responded that the 996 system would be encouraged, not a compulsory practice.

=== ByteDance ===
A CNBC article in May 2021 reported that workers at TikTok's parent company ByteDance were unhappy with the 996 work culture there and that people were turning down job opportunities at TikTok because of it. In November 2021, ByteDance moved away from 996 and mandated shorter working hours. Nevertheless, on 23 February 2022, the sudden death was reported of a 28-year-old employee at ByteDance, after he posted a message on Maimai, a career and social networking platform, the night before. ByteDance later issued a statement that was shared in an internal letter with its staff in China, according to which the employee felt dizzy after an hour of exercise at the company gym, before he was taken to the hospital. The incident raised scrutiny of the frequent overtime demands of Chinese tech companies.

=== JD.com ===
After 58.com's 996 schedule was made known to the public, an internal email from the vice-president Gang He (Chinese: 何刚) of JD.com was leaked online, which contained a demand for the management team of JD.com to implement the 996 working hour system "on a flexible basis".

On 15 March 2019, an employee of JD.com alleged that some departments have begun implementing the 996 schedule, while other departments have already finished doing so. Following the report, the public relations department of JD.com announced that overtime work was not compulsory.

Richard Liu, the founder of the company, said that the reason for his company's layoffs is because there were too many "slackers" and they were not his "brothers". He said JD did not force its staff to work the "996" or even a "995" overtime schedule, "But every person must have the desire to push oneself to the limit!".

=== Pinduoduo ===
In early January 2021, the e-commerce platform Pinduoduo was accused of forcing its employees to do extremely intensive overtimes, which supposedly led to the karoshi death of a 22-year-old worker. Later, the official account of Pinduoduo posted (but deleted shortly afterwards) an answer on Zhihu, saying "Those who are at the bottom of the society earn their wages at the risk of losing their lives".

Just a few days after the early January incident, another employee committed suicide by jumping. On 10 January, news sources reported that Pinduoduo fired an employee who posted photos showing his colleague being carried into an ambulance.

=== Youzan ===
In January 2019, an employee of Youzan stated on the social platform Maimai that their supervisor had enforced the 996 schedule. Bai Ya, the CEO of Youzan, replied, "it would be a good thing to look back at a few years later". Some media outlets criticized this schedule. Later that month, the Labour Supervision Group of Xihu District, Hangzhou announced that the company was under investigation.

=== Others ===
At least 40 companies, including Huawei and Alibaba Group, have implemented the 996 schedule or an even more intensive alternative.

According to two separate reports from the Wired magazine and Marketplace podcast in 2025, a growing number of U.S. AI startups are also implementing the 996 schedule.

== Online protests ==
=== 996.ICU GitHub campaign ===
Logo of Anti-996 GitHub project

On 26 March 2019, the 996.ICU repository and website were created. The repository on GitHub states that the name "996.icu" refers to how developers who work under the 996 system would risk poor health and a possible stay in an intensive care unit. The movement's slogan is "developers' lives matter".

Two days later, on 28 March 2019, the repository had already received 50 thousand stars, and 100 thousand stars on 30 March 2019, which made it the top trending repository on GitHub. The repository reached 120 thousand stars on 31 March 2019, and 200 thousand stars on 9 April 2019, making it the second most starred repository on GitHub. The flurry of activity led to the "issue" page of the repository to be flooded with spam and shut down, which was hotly discussed on Zhihu, Sina Weibo, and WeChat.

The original aim of the repository was to list the companies that use the 996 working hour system, but it soon developed into a movement; the Anti 996 Licence was created to explicitly prohibit companies using the 996 system from using open source (Note: Such a license would not meet most definitions of open source software, such as the Open Source Definition, as the 996 exclusion counts as a limitation on purpose of use.) code licensed under it.

On 2 April 2019, it was widely reported that Tencent's QQ browser, WeChat, Alibaba's UC Browser, Qihoo 360's 360 Browser, and many other browsers developed by companies in mainland China blocked the 996.icu repository on GitHub, describing it as "an illegal and fraudulent site".

On 18 April 2019, employees at Microsoft and GitHub created a GitHub repository named "support.996.ICU" in support of the 996.ICU campaign, which they believe could be under threat of Chinese government censorship.

== Reactions ==
=== Support ===
Jack Ma stated that workers should consider 996 "a huge blessing" as there is no way to "achieve the success [one] want[s] without paying extra effort and time." Jason Calacanis, an entrepreneur and angel investor, describes 996 as "the same exact work ethic that built America".

=== Criticism ===
Several Chinese media outlets criticized the 996 working system. Xin Shi Ping of the Xinhua News Agency said that the system "violates labor law and overtakes health and the future. It does harm to hard-working workers and is a misunderstanding of the hard-working spirit". The People's Daily wrote that "advocating 'hard work' does not mean resorting to and enforcing the 996 system", while an editorial in the China News Service said that it is "unnecessary to exchange life for money".

Beijing Daily criticized Jack Ma and Richard Liu for "boasting" the 996 work schedule, claiming that it is "aimed at disguising reduction of salary or lay-off", while Wang Xinya, a writer for Banyuetan, stated that some entrepreneurs disregarded the law and associate 996 with hard work, calling it "poisonous chicken soup" (毒鸡汤). Wang also stated that the system has nothing to do with employee diligence, but has everything to do with company interests.

Python creator Guido van Rossum described the 996 work schedule as "inhumane" in a tweet commenting on an SCMP article about 996. In 2021, Chinese scholars stressed on policy-makers that "there is a need to reform work policies to realize the lowering of working time per worker in China (and also to curb excessive-work cultures like 996)". Without such initiatives, the dual circulation policy is doomed to fail, they argued.

Some European entrepreneurs argued that 996 is contrary to European values, that it leads to a brain drain, and that the bigger problem for startups is financing.

=== Legal issues ===
The 996 working hour system was deemed illegal by the Supreme People's Court on 27 August 2021. However, some scholars cast doubt whether this ruling will be enforced.

== 007 work schedule ==
The 007 work schedule is a midnight to midnight, seven days a week schedule using a rotational workforce which may be practiced illegally by some companies in China, especially in the high-tech sector. The term 007 could mean several things depending on the source. It may mean the employee is expected to live in the office 24/7 to finish their work, or it could be used to refer to a work-from-home position that requires 24/7 availability, especially during the times of COVID-19. Sometimes it is used sarcastically by workers as the "true" schedule required by employers.

== Occurrence in US tech companies ==
In 2025, amidst the AI boom, reports have emerged of startup tech companies in San Francisco / Silicon Valley requiring "9-9-6" work schedules, with the goal of building things quickly in a competitive market. California Labor Code §515.5 exempts employers from providing many software engineers with overtime pay.

== See also ==
- Buddha-like mindset
- Black company (Japan) – Business with an exploitative work culture
- Crunch (video games) – Compulsory overtime during the development of a game
- Eight-hour day
- Forty-Hour Week Convention, 1935 – An International Labour Organization convention
- Karōshi
- Lochner v. New York, Lochner era – A landmark decision of the U.S. Supreme Court concerning maximum working hours
- Overwork
- Simple living
- Tang ping
- Time poverty
- Wage theft
- Working time
- Workweek length
