= Singleton (lifestyle) =

Living in a single-person household

The term singleton describes those who live in a single-person household, especially those who prefer the lifestyle of living alone. It was popularized by the Bridget Jones novels and films, but it is also used in sociology. By the twenty-first century, the share of people living alone around the world has gone up considerably.

== Patterns ==
Sociologist Eric Klinenberg reports that before the 1950s, no society had large numbers of people living alone. Historically, this has happened when elderly people outlive their spouses, and when men have migrated for work. In modern times, large numbers of people have begun to live happily alone in cities and with the help of communication technologies like the telephone, email, and social networking services. Klinenberg has found that the ability of women to work, own property, and initiate divorce creates increases the probability of people living alone. But in countries like Saudi Arabia where women do not have autonomy, few people live on their own.

Single people may live alone before their first romantic partner, after separation, divorce, the end of a cohabiting relationship or after their partner has died. Some may choose to remain single after a divorce or breakup. Couples, married or not, may maintain separate residences as an alternative to cohabitation in a long distance relationship, a temporary separation due to troubles in the relationship, or simply living apart together. Since the late twentieth century, marriages across the developed world have often ended in divorce. At the same time, people increasingly choose to remain single.

In 2025, The Economist estimated that between the mid-2010s and the mid-2020s, the share of people who live alone around the globe, voluntarily and otherwise, had risen by over a hundred million. The United Nations projected that the global share of single households will increase from 28 percent in 2018 to 35 percent by 2050.

The share of singletons is correlated with how wealthy the country is. In the United States, individuals saw their inflation-adjusted or real income rose by 51 percent from 1969 to 1996, compared to only 6 percent for households over the same period. In wealthy countries, people are more likely to choose the privacy, individualism, independence, and sometimes the solitude of living alone. However, surveys suggest that only a minority of single individuals actually prefer living that way.

While marriage rates have declined, the prevalence of cohabitation (formerly referred to as "living in sin") has gone up. At the same time, significant numbers are critical of marriage, viewing it as an institution that reinforces the subjugation of women and unnecessary for a fulfilling or happy life, though some remain open to that option. Concern over divorce is another reason many choose to remain single.

The number of Americans living alone more than doubled between 1960 and 2017, from 13% to 28%.

Across Europe, each demographic cohort born after the Second World War has been more likely to be single than the previous one at the same age. In the Scandinavian countries, single-person households have become commonplace. In Canada, the share of single-person household has doubled between 1981 and 2021, when it was 4.4 million people, or 15 percent of people aged 15 and over, a record. In the US, the average number of individuals per household has been falling since at least 1966. By the 2020s, more Americans of all age groups are living alone than in the past. How common singletons are also depends on how much people value their individual autonomy.

In some developed nations such as the United Kingdom and the United States, women with university degrees have outnumbered men of the same age group since the late twentieth century, and these women are less keen on finding a romantic match or marriage. In East Asia, urban and highly educated women are wary of the high opportunity cost of marriage in their patriarchal societies; they may have to give up on their careers and incomes to take care of their in-laws, parents, children, and do housework, something men prefer not to do. A similar trend is found in Europe and North America, even though traditional gender roles are not as strictly enforced as in East Asia.

Growing amounts of time spent on electronic devices—in particular, to play video games, to stream music and videos, and to interact with artificially intelligent companions—is behind the rising number of single individuals. In a country where few children are born out of wedlock like Japan, those who do not want to have children also avoid getting married.

By contrast, in poor countries, most people live with their extended families, which provide material, social, and emotional support to each other, as well as imposing the responsibility of similarly caring for other family members.

== Risks and challenges ==
Living alone has been found to significantly increase the risk of depression and is associated with other negative mental and physical health outcomes, especially among men, older people, and rural residents. Those who are "anxiously attached" or crave social connections are most unhappy whereas those who are more independent tend to be more comfortable living alone. Among the happiest people are individuals who are emotionally stable and single, but are willing to enter a romantic relationship.

Research by the World Health Organization and Gallup has refuted the common notion that people in "atomized" or individualistic Western countries feel more lonely. As already explained, people who prefer living alone are not necessarily lonely. By contrast, people in poor countries, such as Madagascar, are more likely to feel this way. But in any given country, poorer people are more likely to feel lonely. For those in the developing world or in more collectivist societies, loneliness remains a challenge even if they are living with family because of the pressure to fulfill familial duties. But even in an individualistic society, popular culture may still promote romantic coupling and a person's friends and relatives may ask intrusive questions about said person's relationship status.

Among women, while married ones are not decisively happier than those who remain single, many still take another person's life choice as a personal affront. Another challenge facing those living alone is they cannot take advantage of tax cuts and other financial benefits available to (married or common-law) couples. However, in democracies, the fact that growing shares of the populations are single means that they could pressure government to change tax codes for their benefits.

== Statistics ==
Distribution of single-person households by country (2021)
| Country | % |
|---|---|
| Finland | 45.34 |
| Germany | 43.14 |
| Norway | 42.14 |
| Latvia | 41.08 |
| Sweden | 39.24 |
| Czech Republic | 39.15 |
| Netherlands | 38.50 |
| Austria | 38.34 |
| Japan | 37.97 |
| France | 37.78 |
| Denmark | 37.57 |
| Estonia | 36.99 |
| Switzerland | 36.88 |
| Italy | 36.64 |
| Bulgaria | 35.81 |
| Belgium | 35.50 |
| South Korea | 35.47 |
| Lithuania | 35.16 |
| Hungary | 34.42 |
| Slovenia | 34.00 |
| Romania | 33.63 |
| Malta | 32.51 |
| Greece | 32.35 |
| Slovakia | 31.40 |
| United Kingdom | 30.81 |
| Canada | 29.35 |
| Iceland | 29.16 |
| Luxembourg | 28.87 |
| Croatia | 27.80 |
| United States | 27.61 |
| Spain | 26.98 |
| Australia | 25.12 |
| Portugal | 24.77 |
| Cyprus | 24.49 |
| Poland | 23.44 |
| Ireland | 23.14 |
| New Zealand | 22.79 |
| Turkey | 18.88 |
| Mexico | 12.46 |
| Costa Rica | 11.27 |

== See also ==
- N-po generation (Korea)
  - 4B movement
- Satori generation (Japan)
- Sexual abstinence
- Single person
