= Shanghai East Hospital =

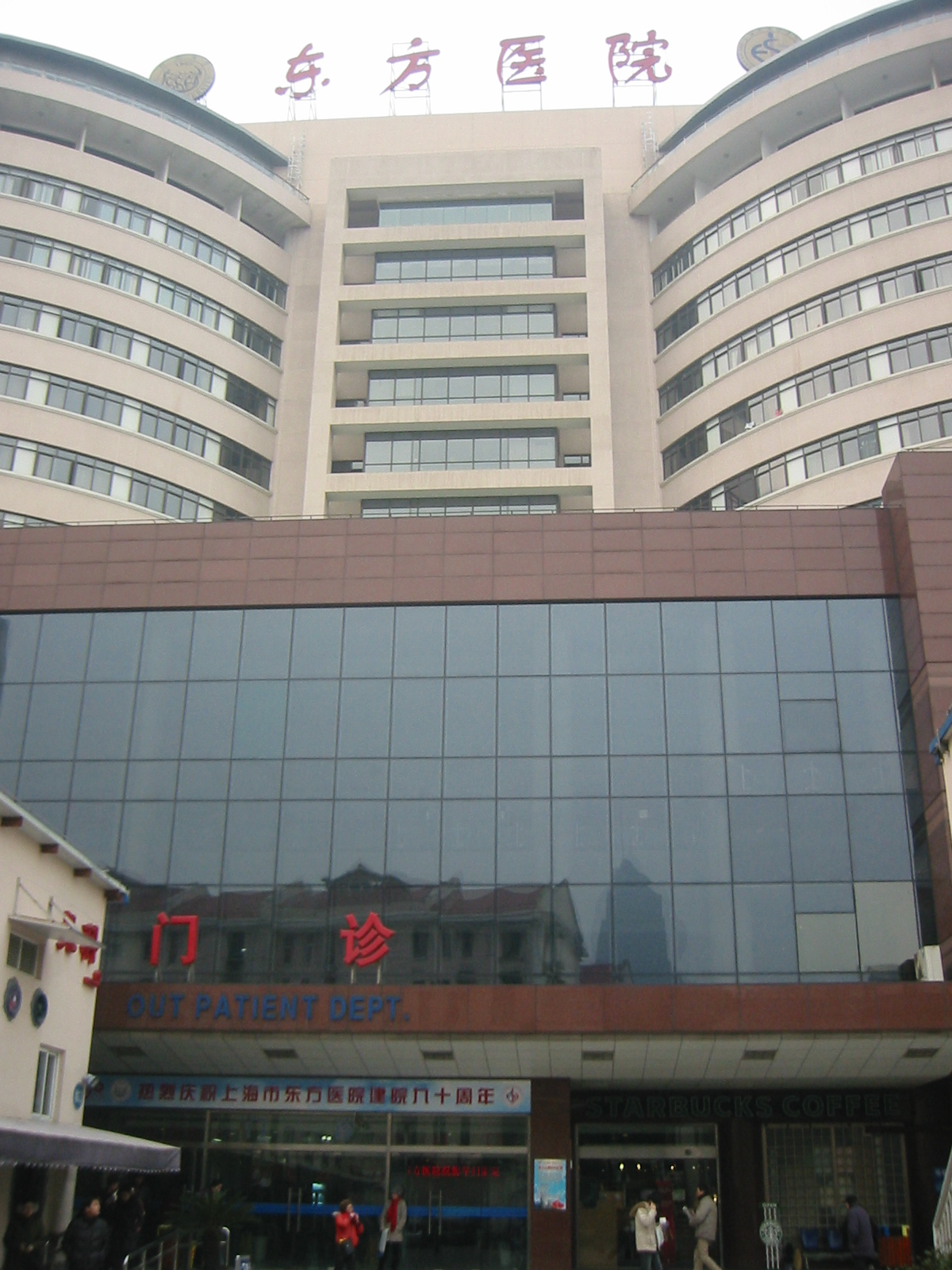
- Shanghai East Hospital front view

Geography
- Location: Pudong, Shanghai, China
- Coordinates: 31.238479°N 121.512241°E

Organisation
- Care system: Public
- Type: Teaching
- Affiliated university: Tongji University

Services
- Emergency department: Yes
- Beds: 2000

History
- Founded: 1920

Links
- Website: www.easthospital.cn
- Lists: Hospitals in China
- Other links: Shanghai Tongji University School of Medicine

Shanghai East Hospital (Chinese: 上海东方医院; pinyin: Shànghǎi Dōngfāng Yīyuàn) is a general hospital in Pudong, Shanghai, China. It is a teaching hospital affiliated to Tongji University.

== Facilities ==
The Shanghai East (Oriental) Hospital, affiliated to Shanghai Tongji University School of Medicine was founded 1920. Two campuses exist in Shanghai. The main campus ('Northern Division') is located in Lujiazui, Pudong, 150 Jimo Road and the South-Campus ('Southern Division') is located in Pudong, 1800 Yuntai Road. Both locations include 61 clinical and technical departments and offices. The hospital includes 2000 in-patient beds total. The hospitals fields of work include medical procedures, disease prevention, medical education and medical research. Both campuses employed 2800 staff members in 2019, including about 400 attending medical doctors. The hospital annually serves more than 3 million walk-in and emergency patients, amongst them are 40000 international patients. The hospital has a 64-row spiral CT machine, Flash CT, PET-CT, 3.0 T MRI, DSA, or EDGE Radiosurgery Systems available within the radiology department. The surgical departments offer Hybrid Operation Rooms, circulatory-assist devices, LINAC, ECT and real-time 3D color ultrasound.

== Key disciplines ==
- Disaster medicine
- Heart failure therapy
- Cardiac surgery
- Cardiovascular medicine
- Dental implantation and prosthodontics
- Minimal invasive gallstone surgery
- Oncology treatment
- Cerebral-vessel disease treatment
- Anorectal surgery
- Cranial tumor surgery

== Notable professors ==
- Dr. Barry J. Marshall, Nobel Prize Winner 2005, Director of the Marhall International Diagnosis and Treatment Centre for Digestive Diseases

== Education and training ==
The Shanghai East Hospitals Education Office is responsible for the domestic education of the undergraduate, postgraduate and doctoral students of Shanghai Tongji University School of Medicine. The medical students are educated by 96 doctoral tutors and 140 master tutors. In 2010, the hospital has established an 'International Clinical Elective Program' in cooperation with German physicians and MedoPolo International Medical Elective Programs. The hospital currently offers the largest international medical student elective program within mainland China and receives roughly 80 - 100 students from all countries annually.

== Scientific research platforms ==
- Laboratory of Arrhythmia of Ministry of Education
- Translational Medicine Center for Stem Cell Research of Zhangjiang
- National Stem Cell Bank
- Shanghai Heart Failure Institute
- Shanghai Municipal Stroke Center

== Rankings ==
- Comprehensive Disease Treatment Index in Shanghai: Number 8 (2016)
- Science and Technology Impact in China: Number 68 (2016)
- Nature Index: Number 8 (2017)
- National Natural Science Foundation of China: Number 20 (2017)

== Foreign cooperations ==
- Sino-German Heart Research Institute, cooperating with the German Heart Center in Berlin (DHZB) (2001).
- Sino-American International Hospital
- Sino- Japanese Senmao Clinic
- Sino-French Urological Surgery Center
- Sino-American East-Anderson Tumor Center
- Sino-American Emergency Research Institute

== See also ==
- Introduction to Shanghai East Hospital
- Official website of the Shanghai East Hospital (in Chinese)
