= Hell Joseon =

South Korean self-deprecating term

Hell Joseon (Korean: 헬조선; RR: Heljoseon; MR: Helchosŏn; lit. 'Hell Korea') is a satirical South Korean term that became popular around 2015. The term is used to criticize the socioeconomic situation in South Korea. The term first gained popularity among younger Koreans as a result of anxieties and discontentment about unemployment and working conditions in modern South Korean society.

== Etymology ==
The phrase is a mixture of the words "Hell" and "Joseon", meaning that "(South) Korea is a hellish, hopeless society". Although the term began with private individuals on the internet, it was later adopted by the mass media.

== Concept ==
The phrase has been used to express opposition towards government policies seen as contributing to youth unemployment, economic inequality, excessive working time, inability to escape from poverty despite hard work, a society that favors vested interests, and general irrationality in daily life. Usage of this term increased through social-networking websites such as Twitter and Facebook, spreading particularly among younger individuals in September 2015.

By 2019, the phrase had been superseded by a new term, "Tal-Jo", a portmanteau comprising "leave" and "Joseon", which might be best translated as "Escape Hell".

== Background ==
One widely accepted reason for the rapid spread of the phrase "Hell Joseon" is a growing social discourse and awareness of social inequality in South Korea.

=== Military ===
South Korea operates a compulsory military service draft system for male citizens between the ages of 18 and 35. The current military service period is 18 months for the Army and Marines, 20 months for the Navy, and 21 months for the Air Force. Conscripted Koreans spend much of their time in the military where they are disconnected from society. Economic inequality may also materialize through compulsory military service, where those with the resources or connections to avoid conscription also avoid abuses like hazing. These lead many Koreans to attempt draft dodging with some using wealth and connections to gain exemptions or emigrate.

Koreans with English language skills may apply for competitive spots to serve with American soldiers as KATUSAs in the belief they will receive better treatment under the United States Army. There also are cases of draft dodgers attaining exemptions by bribing medical professionals to report false diagnoses.

=== Academic requirements ===
In South Korea, many young people attend college because they believe they will have a difficult time finding employment without a college education.

=== High population density ===
The population density of Korea is 519 people/km^{2}. Seoul is very dense, at around 16,593 people/km^{2}. This level of population causes poverty for many and contributes to competition for desirable jobs (such as those with job security or higher social prestige) and living spaces. Some have abandoned their hopes for marriage and children (known as the Sampo generation) as they cannot afford to support a family or wish to focus on their professional lives.

=== Cultural influence ===
On September 3, 2015, DC Inside opened the Hell Joseon Gallery. Since September 2015, the exposure of the phrase increased considerably online. In addition, DC Inside users can express the oppressed complaints of young people. Several other films, perhaps most prominently the 2019 Parasite, have similarly commented on social inequality in South Korea.

== Criticism ==
Critics of the term say "the surplus man who does nothing tells the story of Hell Joseon". It is also pointed out that the phrase itself is caused by dissatisfaction with society's inequality or absurdity, but it is also problematic in that it does not actually expect any political actions. Lee Er Young said, "The countries that [dissatisfied people] want to [go to after they] leave the Hell Joseon are not heaven" and that "the present employment and inequality situations are a global phenomenon, which is the result of the development of information technology."

Former president of South Korea, Park Geun-hye, said "There are a growing number of new words that deny our great modern history and disparage our world that is envied as a place to live," as a way of criticizing the trend of the phrase "Hell Joseon". She added, "Self-depreciation, pessimism, distrust and hatred can never be the driving force of change and development". However, some argued that Park's government should think about why the phrase "Hell Joseon" was born, because the term was coined during her presidency.

In January 2019, president Moon Jae-in's economic adviser Kim Hyun-chul resigned after drawing public ire for saying that young, unemployed Korean language graduates who cannot find a job in Korea should stop blaming "Hell Joseon" and move to Southeast Asia to become Korean language teachers.

== See also ==
- Economy of South Korea
- Gireogi appa
