= Tongji University School of Medicine =

Medical school in Shanghai, China

Coordinates: 31.2698°N 121.3898°E

Tongji University School of Medicine, Tongji University
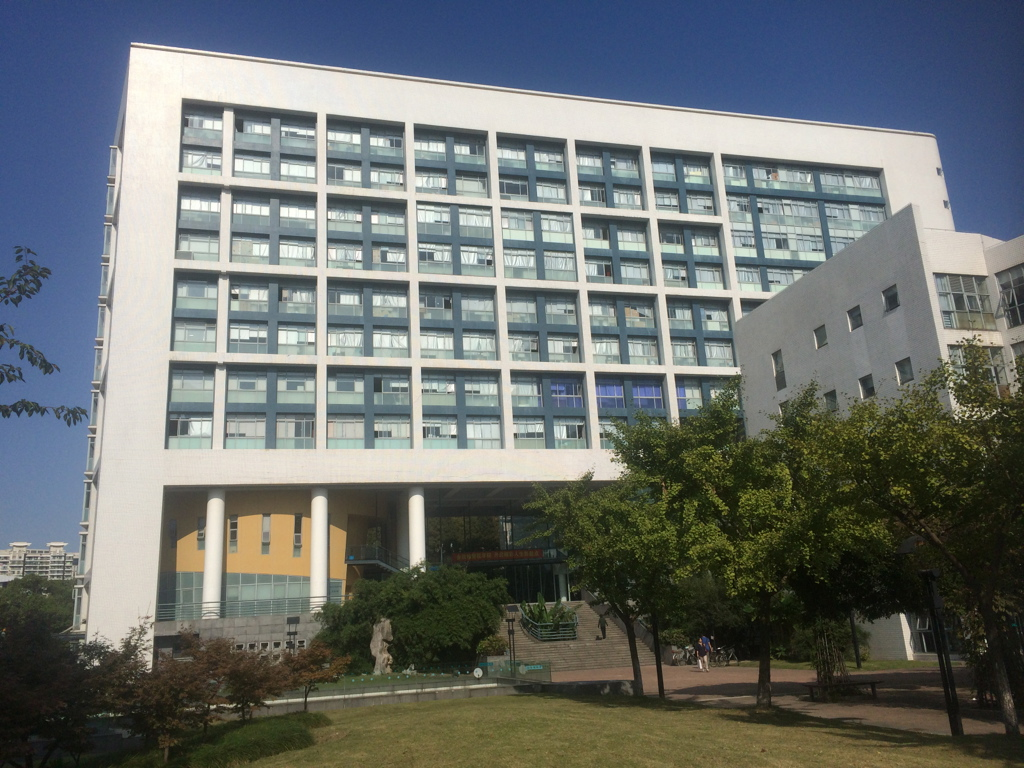
- TUSM main building
- Type: Public
- Established: 1907; 119 years ago
- Location: Shanghai, China

Tongji University School of Medicine (TUSM) is a school of Tongji University in Shanghai. The main campus of TUSM is located on Siping campus at 50 Chifeng Rd, Yangpu, Shanghai.

== History ==
Tongji University School of Medicine was founded in 1907 by the German doctor Erich Paulon, who established the Tongji German Medical School in Shanghai, China. The foundation was aided by funding from Germany at the beginning.

In 1917, the institutions was renamed to Tongji Medical and Engineering School and later Private Tongji Medical and Engineering Specialist School. The institution has been officially accepted as a university in 1923 and was renamed to National Tongji University and designated as National University of China in 1927. When the anti-Japanese war began 1937, the location of the institution was moved six times. Those cities or provinces were Zhejiang, Jiangxi, Guangxi, Yunnan, Lizhuang, Yibin, and Sichuan in 1940. In 1946, TUSM finally moved back to Shanghai.

== Degree programs ==
As Medicine remains one of the key disciplines of Tongji University, TUSM offers several degree programs.

=== Chinese taught degree programs ===
- Bachelor of Clinical Medicine
- Master of Medicine and Science
- Doctor of Medicine (MD)
- PhD

=== English taught degree programs ===
- Bachelor of Medicine
- Bachelor of Surgery (MBBS)
- Master of Medicine
- Doctor of Medicine MD

TUSM also offers other graduate, scientific research, and international medical exchange programs besides the clinical degree programs.

== Clinical institutes and centers ==
TUSM has seven affiliated teaching hospitals:

- Tongji Hospital
- Shanghai Tenth People Hospital
- Shanghai East Hospital
- Shanghai Pulmonary Hospital
- Shanghai First Maternity and Infant Health Hospital
- Shanghai Yangpu Hospital
- Shanghai Yangzhi Rehabilitation Hospital
