= N-po generation =

South Korean neologism

N-po generation (Korean: N포세대; Hanja: N抛世代; RR: N-posedae; lit. 'generation that has given up on N things') is a 2010s neologism in South Korea for the generation of Koreans who have given up on seemingly-infinite aspects of traditional success in adult life, up to even their will to live.

N-po generation as a term came after Sampo Generation (Korean: 삼포세대; Hanja: 三抛世代; RR: samposedae, "Three giving-up generation") for people having given up on three (sam) things: dating, marriage, and child-rearing. Many of the young generation in South Korea have given up those three things because of social pressures and economic problems, such as increasing cost-of-living, tuition payments, and affordable housing scarcity. The Opo Generation has given up additionally on home ownership and personal relationships. The Chilpo Generation have given up on seven (chil) aspects of adult life, including their hopes and their careers. The Gupo Generation has additionally given up on their health and physical appearance, totaling nine aspects of life. Finally, the sippo sedae ("ten giving-up generation") or wanpo sedae ("total giving-up generation") culminates in giving up on life.

These neologisms represent the social issues that many young people in their 20s and 30s in South Korea are dealing with despite the country’s economic boom and international cultural capital. Young Koreans are giving up on dating and marriage and putting off having children on the grounds that they cannot afford to care for themselves, let alone a family, due to economic and social pressures, such as soaring prices, tuition fees, job shortages, and exhorbitant home prices.

== Origin and expansion of the word ==
The term Sampo generation was used by the special reports team of Kyunghyang Shinmun in the 2011 publication "Talking About the Welfare State". They defined Sampo generation members as those with unstable jobs, high student loan payments, precarious preparations for employment, etc., and who postponed love, marriage, and childbirth without any prospective plans. The report argued that the burden of starting a family in South Korea was so high because of the government's preference to delegate social welfare duties to families themselves.

The emergence of the Sampo generation demonstrates that the structure of the traditional family unit was disintegrating at an alarming rate, according to the report. This word and its definition rapidly spread through various media and the Internet. The term means "three abandoning generation" or "three giving up generation", referring to the three things the Sampo generation is giving up on: courtship, marriage and children.

It is a term coined to show that the burden of Korean families who have taken on welfare that the state is not responsible for has reached a critical point, eventually reaching a state of disintegration of the traditional family form. From an economic perspective, the term is both economically depressive and, at the same time, the domestic market is shrinking because Korea is heavily dependent on imported goods. This can be defined as a country where stagflation is a common practice due to low economic growth, very low wages, and rising prices due to its unique economic structure, resulting in higher cost of living compared to lower income, leading to the creation of such terms.

Since then, it has spread through media, political circles, and the Internet, and has become a term used to characterize the lives of some of the young people in our society. Young adults in not only Korea but also the U.S. are becoming more economically dependent on parents and the reality of Millennials, which was noted until a few years ago, can be seen as similar to Korea's Sampo generation.

== Sociological analysis ==
The main cause of the word's birth is assumed to be the economic and social pressures of modern society on young people.

- Many young Koreans tend to regard love as a luxury due to being overwhelmed by the social climate of paying back student loans, suffering from excessive housing and living expenses, and pushing them to work toward the best specs, if not part of a first-rate company, because of the social structure that values only the large companies called chaebols.
- The generalization of business-like wedding halls, which carefully assess each other's business specifications instead of romantic ones, and the rapid increase in wedding costs.
- It is frustrating to many young people who do not meet the conditions for being legally or socially eligible to marry.
- Even if they are married, they will be burdened with the cost of childcare, and the low birthrate trend caused by these economic pressures and the lack of social consideration for working mothers are significant factors that make young couples hesitate to give birth.

=== Survey results ===
Reason to be Sampo Generation
	%
There's no money to save	53.5
It's difficult even though he/she has money	42.1
It's hard to get a job	33.1
Take-home pay is low	32.1
Personal debt is high	16.8

And also, with the exception of a group of owners who would not give up anything, four types of abandonment were found, with uncertainty of the order of 27.36% of the total samples, 19.92% of the actualist, 13.24% of the self-absorbed type and 8.70% of the suspended type.

== Consequences ==
In the modern age, the need for marriage has disappeared, and the sense that marriage is not necessary has spread. Marriage and childcare have shifted from necessity toward individualistic choice. Socially, this can explain the decreasing birthrate, as late or lack-of marriage lifts a burden of childcare, can induce depression and suicide rates, and accelerates an aging society and the absence of a generation responsible for the welfare of the elderly.

== Similar issues in other countries ==
- In the United States, many millennials and late Generation Xers also belong to the Boomerang Generation, who live with their parents after they would normally be considered old enough to live on their own. This social phenomenon is mainly caused by high unemployment rates coupled with various economic downturns and high cost of housing, and in turn, many Boomerang children postpone romance and marriage due to economic hardship.
- In Japan, the generation of youths in the 10 to 20s range since around 2010 is called the "Satori generation". They are similar to the "Sampo Generation". Typically, they are not interested in luxury items, trips abroad, money, and successful careers.
- In Europe, there are several terms and groups comparable to the "Sampo generation". In Greece, they are called the 700 euro generation. These youngsters often work at temporary jobs and receive the minimum allowable salary of 700 euros a month. The term began to appear in 2008.
- In China, a popular phenomenon called "tang ping", or lying flat, that describes Chinese youth who refuse to conform to social pressures such as hard work or even overwork, thereby lowering their personal desires and wants.

== See also ==
- Hell Joseon, Korea
- Spoon class theory, Korea
- Voluntary childlessness in South Korea
- 4B movement

International:

- 9X Generation, Vietnam
- Buddha-like mindset, China
- Freeter, Japan
- Satori generation, Japan
- Strawberry generation, Taiwan
- Tang ping, China

General:

- NEET
- Sexual abstinence
- Singleton (lifestyle)
- Working poor
