= Unemployment in South Korea =

- Flag
- Capital: Seoul
- Official languages: Korean
- Demonym: Korean

Area
  - Total: 219,155 km^{2} (84,616 sq mi)

Population
  - Estimate: 51,446,201 (27th)
- GDP (PPP): 2018 estimate
  - Total: 3.139 trillion
- Currency: South Korean Won (KRW)

The unemployment rate in the Republic of Korea as of December 2021 is 3.7 percent. Since its rapid globalization and democratization, the unemployment rate has been comparatively low compared to most OECD countries. This remains the case as of 2021. Being Asia’s fourth-largest economy, the country's booming exports have helped to maintain the unemployment rate very low by the standards of developed countries. There are several measurement differences between the standard of measurement set by the International Labour Organisation and the official measurement of unemployment in the Republic of Korea, set by Statistics Korea, that contribute to an inflated unemployment rate when compared to other countries that abide more strictly by the standard set by the International Labour Organisation.

The official measurement of unemployment by the Republic of Korea differs slightly from the international standard set by the International Labour Organization, and this may skew the rate in different directions.

== Definition and measurement of unemployment ==
In 2018, the unemployment rate in the Republic of Korea hit its highest level since the 2008 financial crisis, peaking at 4.4%. At the end of 2021, the rate was down to 3.7 percent. This was in line with the rate of the previous two decades.

Unemployment in South Korea is measured by Statistics Korea. The definition of an officially ‘unemployed person’ used for data collection by the Republic of Korea is a person aged 15 and over who:

1. Had no employment during the reference week

2. Had actively sought employment at some time during the previous four weeks

3. Was able to start work immediately during the reference week.

This definition is based on the recommended definition from the International Labour Organisation (ILO), allowing the unemployment rate in the Republic of Korea to be measured comparably to other countries around the world.

The unemployment of the Republic of Korea rate is defined as the percentage of unemployed persons in the economically active population.

Unemployment rate = (unemployed persons / economically active population) x 100

The ‘economically active population’ (employed persons + unemployed persons) is over 15. By comparison, the ‘economically inactive’ population refers to people aged 15 or older who are neither employed nor unemployed during the survey reference period.

== History and development ==
Since undergoing rapid economic development in the 1960s, the Republic of Korea's unemployment rate had been consistently low After processes of democratization in the late 1980s, Korea saw a sharp increase in labor participation, and hence a lowered unemployment rate. From the 1980s until the 1997 Asian financial crisis, the unemployment rate averaged approximately 2.3 percent. The 1997 Asian financial crisis saw the unemployment rate skyrocket to 7%, totaling 1,490,000 people. Comparatively, the 2008 financial crisis had minimal effect on South Korea, with the unemployment rate rising from 3.16% to 3.64%. From 2008 to 2013, the unemployment rate remained relatively steady, averaging at 3.4%. As of December 2021, the rate was 3.7%, in line with the average of the previous two decades.

== Republic of Korea unemployment rate ==
The Republic of Korea's unemployment rate as of 2025 is 2.8% percent.

== Causes ==
=== Economic performance ===
In 1953, the Republic of Korea passed the Labour Standard Act in order to protect workers’ rights. Despite this, a minimum wage was not regulated until 1986. The minimum wage was then raised in 2001 by 16.8%, and again in 2018 by 16.4%, to 7530 won (US$7.03) per hour. Most recently, it was raised in January 2019 to 8350 won (US$7.46) per hour. This is argued to have led to a drop in low-paying jobs across many different sectors. Jobs in manufacturing declined by 170,000 jobs in a year. The construction sector lost 19,000 jobs, and the retail sector cut 67,000 jobs. With many companies using the raising minimum wage to cut various traditionally low-paying jobs due to rising costs of labor, the unemployment rate has risen to reflect this concept. Lobby groups representing many small businesses within the country have since made statements saying that they will not accept the raise in minimum wage due to them needing to cut staff jobs in order to make a profit. As of 2021, these effects were gone and the hike in the minimum wage had had no discernible impact on employment.

=== Outsourcing ===
Outsourcing is the collection of goods by contract from an outside supplier. At 22% in 2015, the rate of temporary, outsourced contract workers in the Republic of Korea was double the OECD average. Workers under these systems are also earning 54% of what regular employees earn from similar work. Furthermore, there is a critical concern that current labor protection mechanisms do not serve to protect these new types of workers. This, combined with the idea that contracts will end once the task is completed, contributes immensely to the growing unemployment rate at any one time of the survey.

Outsourcing also involves moving business overseas. The continuous increase of the minimum wage in the Republic of Korea has prompted firms to relocate their factories overseas to lower-wage rate countries in order to save costs. This is called the "macroeconomic theory of internalization". Korean technology company Samsung Electronics has suffered from a "technological hollowing out" (기술 공동화) and "technological disconnection (기술 단절). "Technological hollowing out" is defined as a situation in which essential parts of a technological creation process are not available inside a home/domestic territory. "Technological disconnection" refers to a situation where specific technologies or manpower are available in the domestic territory, however, there is no successor to that information, thus ending the execution of the technological product. Samsung has recently generated a substantial amount of media coverage for outsourcing to China, where workers are paid less for longer hours. As a result of this outsourcing there has been a steady decrease in laboring jobs on the production lines of Samsung and other bigger production companies.

=== Technology ===
The OECD Youth Unemployment Rate in South Korea, 2001-2016

South Korea is at the top of the International Federation of Robotics (IFR)’s robot density list - 631 robots per 10,000 employees. For example, Lotte Department Stores, one of the largest retailers in Korea, has recently built a technologically-driven counter service system, replacing sales staff. The automation of these jobs has driven workers to jobs that are not yet automated, making it extremely competitive to be hired. For jobs that do not require qualifications, such as basic hospitality jobs, there could be one availability for 4500 applicants.

Despite the rapid technological advancements of workplaces in South Korea, In January 2019 it was reported that the ICT sector had gained 94,000 new job openings in that month alone.

=== Gender inequality ===
A multitude of practices concerning gender inequality has led to a larger unemployment rate of women in the workforce in South Korea. Employment discrimination, private sector policies, and a lack of women's bargaining power in employee relations emphasized by both State and private policy all contribute to the unemployment rate. In 2010, Korea had the third-lowest gender gap in employment out of 34 OECD countries, with 62.3% of women between the ages of 25 and 65 employed. Economists put this large gap down to traditional Confucian beliefs continuing to hold strong within Korean society, where the family unit is the most important aspect of one's life. This belief fosters continued gender segregation in the labor force. Combined with a lack of childcare centers, difficulties negotiating wages, and an already-existing gender wage gap, South Korean women are vastly under-employed.

=== Preference for higher education ===
The Republic of Korea maintains one of the highest rates of educated populations in the world. According to the Organisation for Economic Cooperation and Development (OECD), approximately 70 per-cent of 25-34 year olds in the Republic of Korea have completed some form of tertiary education. Between the early 1980s and mid-2000s, the country's tertiary education rate had increased to five times its original rate. The graduates of top Korean Universities overwhelmingly hold high-ranking positions within government, business and industry. This devotion to learning, however, skews the unemployment rate as many young adults are technically unemployed due to their decisions to remain in schooling. The hyper-competitive nature of the Korean education system prompts some students to study over 16 hours a day at school, before-school and after-school programs called hagwons (학원). As a result, students that also hold jobs are rare, vastly increasing the unemployment rate.

=== Measurement differences ===
The methods used to measure the Korean unemployment rate, as measured by Statistics Korea, is slightly different to the method used by other OECD countries. The Republic of Korea's 'economically inactive' population is thought to be hiding a large number of individuals that are employed to the standards of the International Labour Organisation, but not the official Korean measurement system. Individuals over the age of 15 who are neither employed nor unemployed, housewives who primarily act as caregivers, students attending school, and volunteers are included in the 'economically inactive' population and do not contribute to the official unemployment rate.

A large difference occurs when considering 'unpaid family workers'. In accordance with the International Labour Organisation standards, unpaid family workers who work more than one hour per week are categorized as employed. However, the official Korean measurement will only consider unpaid family workers to be employed if they work more than 18 hours in any given week. The individuals who fall into this 17-hour difference between the two measurements are classified to be within the Republic of Korea's 'economically inactive' population. When unpaid family workers are included in calculations in accordance with the International Labour Organisation, the unemployment rate decreases by approximately 0.1 percent and the employment rate increases by about 0.4 percent.

Under the International Labour Organisation Standards, individuals who are awaiting an assignment from their companies, are seasonal workers not immediately working or who are in similar situations are considered to be employed depending on the specific company they work for. In the Republic of Korea, however, all workers in those situations are considered unemployed (4000 in 2008).

The definitions of 'job-seeking' also differ in the Republic of Korea. Individuals who list 'schooling' or 'higher education attendance' or 'gaining professional qualifications' as a job-seeking activity when considering their employment status would be considered to be "actively job-seeking" under the International Labour Organisation. However, the Republic of Korea defines those individuals as 'economically inactive', with the number amounting to approximately 600,000 individuals.
