= Economic inequality in South Korea =

According to data from 2010, low-income earners (those earning 12 million won or less) make up 37.8% of South Korea's labour force. Conversely, the highest income earners (those earning 100 million won or more) make up 1.4% of the labour force.

According to a survey in 2019, among young South Koreans, 89.3% of women and 81.7% of men agreed with the statement that "people born into poverty can never compete with [those] born into wealth".

== Current situation ==
Among other countries in OECD, South Korea performs relatively well when considering indicators such as the Gini coefficient and Palma ratio, especially when limiting the comparison to countries with similar populations.

However, income polarization (the income gap) has not eased since the IMF stimulus, and thus is becoming more serious as of 2018.

In 2014, the poverty gap index was 39%, which ranked third overall among OECD countries. According to Wells X, the nation's top-tier 1390 people monopolize assets worth around 270 trillion won, comparable to the national budget.

In 2020, the COVID-19 pandemic exacerbated economic inequality in South Korea. South Korea's President, Moon Jae-in, attributed a deepening wealth gap between the rich and the poor to the 2020 COVID-19 pandemic.

South Korea's economy depends on the gross domestic product generated by a handful of the country's largest companies. Over the past 15 years, more than half of the country's GDP each year came from its top five largest conglomerates.

The following table shows the number of people and earned income by annual salary in Korea.

| Sort | Number of People | Percentage of total workers | Earned Income | Percentage of total earned income |
|---|---|---|---|---|
| 10 million won or less | 4.51M | 31.6% | 21.0 trillion won | 5.70% |
| 12 million won or less | 5.41M | 37.8% | 31.3 trillion won | 8.47% |
| 30 million won or less | 9.90M | 69.3% | 123.0 trillion won | 33.28% |
| 45 million won or less | 11.89M | 91.4% | 123.0 trillion won | 47.15% |
| 60 million won or less | 13.06M | 96.7% | 260.2 trillion won | 70.41% |
| 80 million won or less | 13.82M | 97.4% | 313.1 trillion won | 84.72% |
| 100 million won or less | 14.09M | 98.6% | 337.4 trillion won | 91.30% |
| Over the 100 million won | 0.19M | 1.4% | 32.2 trillion won | 8.70% |
| SUM | 14.29M | 100% | 369.6 trillion won | 100.00% |

2020 OECD Poverty Rate Rank. South Korea ranks second overall.

== Problems created by economic inequality ==
According to the International Monetary fund, economic polarization creates many problems, including increased political polarization, lower economic growth and eroding social cohesion.

=== Effects on South Korean youth ===
Economic inequality is often linked to low or limited social mobility, a situation which may instill a sense of hopelessness among South Korea's youth. Gambling, though extremely limited due to its legality in South Korea, can be a dangerous source of debt for South Koreans who are susceptible to gambling and gambling addiction. In 2017, the availability of cryptocurrency in South Korea, combined with a lack of legal outlets for gambling, has contributed to gambling problems and associated debt.

== Causes ==
There are many causes for economic inequality, but the following causes are mainly talked about in Korea.

=== Political inequality ===
In his book The Great Leveler, Walter Schaedel said that political inequality creates economic inequality. In the book, the author said, "As the nation has historically been formed, public power has been concentrated on a few people. In terms of hierarchy, it is a very sharp spire structure. These political inequalities have encouraged economic inequality," The Republic of Korea says that economic inequality has intensified since the 1990s as well as political inequality.

In the 2016 Hanyang University dissertation, a survey was conducted on the perception of economic inequality among generations. In the paper, 70 percent of the people held the government responsible for failing to narrow the income gap. So many modern people say that the current government's policy inequality is not helping to bridge the gap between the rich and the poor.

=== Employment deterioration ===
The poverty of low-income people is getting worse due to the long-term deterioration of employment in South Korea. Therefore, the government has tried to increase employment every time over the past few years, but no results have been made yet. In an article published in the 2018 Korean Times, the IMF said Korea's income inequality was the poorest among 22 Asian-Pacific countries. In this article, the nation's economic growth is growing fast, but it also talked about inequality in household income due to the difficulty of finding jobs for young job seekers.

== Proposed solutions ==
One proposed solution to bridge the gap between the rich and the poor is the establishment of a universal social safety net. South Korea's share of government spending on welfare is among the lowest among OECD countries. There is a need to resolve the gap between the rich and the poor.

As a representative economic policy for resolving income inequality, Korea has an income-led growth policy, and disaster support funds from around the world, which were prepared due to economic damage caused by COVID-19, can also be seen as efforts to bridge the gap between the rich and the poor in the short term and in numerical terms by guaranteeing basic income for low-income families.

A 2018 Korea University degree paper conducted a study on how social welfare policies improve economic inequality. In the paper, two countries were cited as examples: Sweden, which developed industrial competitiveness based on marketism before implementing social welfare, and the United Kingdom, which maintained a balance between industrial competitiveness and welfare efficiency. The paper stated that the Korea public pension and the basic livelihood security system required more financial support. For health security, support was needed first for the lower-income class for the continuity of working welfare. In addition, in order to continuously supplement and develop industrial competitiveness, it is necessary education provides fair opportunities and discovers talent. It also states that it is necessary to divide the low-income class in Korea into recipients of welfare and the class directly above so that people do not feel a decline in their motivation to work.

== Gender inequality ==
Considering history and economics, the gender gap issue has greatly improved since the 1970s, when the Korean economy started to boom. Nevertheless, Inequality in social, cultural, and economic spheres affects Korean women in the modern day. Since 2002, 72.4% of women perceived gender inequality within the society, according to the Social Survey by Statistics Korea.

According to the Asian Development Bank, the female labor force participation rate in South Korea has climbed from 54.4% to 67.5%, whereas the growth rate in per capita income has risen from 3.6% to 4.1% on average, over a generation. Additionally, differences between men and women at home and in the labor market were eliminated.

Nevertheless, the terminology or way of referring to women has not gradually developed like the South Korean economy. Some Koreans still refer to a woman as Djip-saram, meaning a person who stays at home, and a husband as Bakat-Yangban, which denotes a guy who goes working for his family. In other words, the considered stereotype reflects the notion that women should stay at home and take care of their children whereas men should go to work.

The country still faces a notable gender participation within the job market. The Republic of Korea's female labor force participation rate (LFPR), is much lower than the male rate for approximately 77%. More specifically, just 55% of Korean women between the ages of 15 and 64 are employed. Despite the fact that South Korea does not make a noticeable difference between the average of OECD countries (being 79%). The country is below average when it comes to labor force of women between the ages of 15 and 24, considering the 65% averaged. The level of education is a factor related the gender gap of the LFPR, considering the 88.3% of the men with a graduate school education whereas women rate was 62.9% with the same education degree. In 2024, even though average salaries for South Korean workers reached an all-time high, the gender gap remained, at a rate of 31.2 percent.

== Poverty ==
Since 1975, rural residents in Korea experience poverty to a considerably higher level than urban residents. All agricultural families reported expenditures per capita lower than the mean for urban households. At the time, there was a relationship between the demographic level among families and the level of poverty. Therefore, a reduction of poverty levels among households was reached while decreasing the quantity of family members. Nevertheless, a study that compares poverty levels comparing Chile, Mexico and South Korea, showed that South Korea has historically low inequality and has had the greatest achievement in eradicating poverty among the three countries. This resulted from the nation's social initiatives of the time being increased.

Considering the context on a growth that took place under a rightist/conservative dictatorship within the country, as well as supported by a military strongly allied with influential business conglomerates known as chaebols; this made policies to get influenced with early land reform and labor-intensive export-oriented manufacturing, with the aim of reducing poverty. Notwithstanding, in terms of social welfare spending as mentioned in the paper, Korea only increased to 4.6 percent of GDP contemplating much less money spent related to social security. The aforementioned has a clear relationship with the inequality factor in the country, since considering the comparison with other countries, the report considers that the decrease in social security increases inequality, as in the case of Mexico. On the other side, after the government implemented land reform in Korea, the country's powerful government was able to oversee an employment- and farmer-driven economic strategy that decreased poverty and kept inequality at a minimum.

== COVID-19 situation ==
Compared to another Asian country such as the Philippines, South Korea had an advantage considering the 600 COVID testing centers with 58 in the Philippines at the time.

Despite the fact that socioeconomic status was unrelated to in-hospital mortality in South Korean COVID-19 patients due to the full covering of hospital costs for these patients; the increased probability of a COVID-19 infection took place mostly in the lower socioeconomic households. Speaking about gap age, the relationship between adults over 60 years of age who presented the above mentioned condition were even more prone. However, for those aged 20 to 39 years, the level of infection was higher regardless of the socioeconomic status of the youngest.

Considering the adversities of globalization, there is a clear unequal relation regarding injustice, distribution of wealth and the relation to the severity of the contagion. The differences between dying, having been hospitalized and having received effective treatment also lead to background factors that explain inequality. Among them, the possibility of being able to stop working to recover from the disease properly, to receive a reduction in salary and the necessary medications, are differences at the global level that contributed to the injustice and poor distribution of goods in the pandemic. SMEs, lower-income households, undocumented immigrants, and workers with poor benefits and working conditions were the most impacted at the national level. More generally, South Korea was hit hardest with high levels of unemployment as well as a collapsing economy.

== See also ==
- Economic inequality in China
