= 9X Generation =

Vietnamese demographic cohort born in the 1990s

Thế hệ 9X (literally "9X Generation", often referred to simply as 9X) is a Vietnamese term for people born during the 1990s. The usage of 9X was used to refer to both Vietnamese people and people of varying Asian cultures born during the 1990s. The 9X generation of Vietnam refers to those that grew up during the development of Vietnam's economy, information technology, and other influential events that opened Vietnam to the world.

They were described as being a progressive and rebellious generation. They are often described as being more confident than members of older generations, they dare to freely pursue personal interests, and are more proficient in foreign languages. Technology, specifically the internet, is an important part of their lives. They are also willing to reject established traditions, ignore elder class values, listen to classical music, and follow foreign fashion trends and lifestyles.

This generation has now become matured citizens of Vietnam. It has subsequently been succeeded by the 2K Generation; the phrase is used to refer to people that were born between 2000 and 2009. This phrase was later popularly outshone by the term "Gen Z" which has a very close definition to the "2K."

== See also ==
- Demographics of Vietnam
- Post-90s, Chinese equivalent
- Sampo generation, Korean equivalent
- Strawberry generation, Taiwanese counterpart
- Tang ping, Chinese term
- Late Millennials and early Generation Z, roughly equivalent Western cohorts
- Zillennials
