= Tang ping =

Chinese neologism, "lying flat"

- Chinese: 躺平
- Literal meaning: lying flat
Transcriptions
Standard Mandarin
- Hanyu Pinyin: tǎng píng
- Bopomofo: ㄊㄤˇ ㄆㄧㄥˊ
- Gwoyeu Romatzyh: taang pyng
- Wade–Giles: t'ang^{3} p'ing^{2}
- IPA: [tʰàŋ.pʰǐŋ]
Yue: Cantonese
- Jyutping: tong^{2} ping^{4}
Southern Min
- Hokkien POJ: tháng pêⁿ

Tang ping (Chinese: 躺平; pinyin: tǎng píng; lit. 'lying flat') is a Chinese slang term for a personal rejection of societal pressure to overwork and over-achieve, such as in the 996 working hour system. Tang ping means choosing to "lie down flat and get over the beatings" by adopting a "low-desire life."

Novelist Liao Zenghu described "lying flat" as a passive-aggressive resistance movement, and The New York Times called it part of a nascent Chinese counterculture. It has also been compared to the Great Resignation, a surge of resignations that began in the West at roughly the same time. The National Language Resources Monitoring and Research Center, affiliated with China's Ministry of Education, listed the phrase among the ten most popular memes on the Chinese Internet in 2021.

Those who choose to "lie flat" may lower their professional commitment and economic ambitions, prioritize psychological health over economic materialism, and simplify their goals, while still being fiscally productive to meet their essential needs.

The phrase "quiet quitting", meaning doing only what one's job demands and nothing more, which became popular in the United States in 2022, was thought to be inspired by the tang ping movement. Another newer related phrase is bai lan (Chinese: 摆烂; pinyin: bǎi làn; lit. 'let it rot'), which means "to actively embrace a deteriorating situation, rather than trying to turn it around". Basically, it refers to a voluntary retreat from pursuing certain goals because individuals realize they are simply too difficult to achieve. An extreme version of lying flat dubbed "rat people" (Chinese: 老鼠人; pinyin: lǎoshǔrén) had surfaced in 2025. In 2025, the Cyberspace Administration of China mandated that social media platforms censor expressions of lying flat and other "negative worldviews".

== Etymology and meaning ==
The term tang ping (躺平) literally means "lying flat," from tǎng (躺, "to recline") and píng (平, "flat").

As slang it refers to stepping back from pressure to work, compete, and meet conventional markers of success such as home ownership, marriage, and children.

People who "lie flat" may reduce their working hours, spend less, and prioritize psychological well-being over material success, while still meeting their essential needs.

Lying flat is frequently discussed alongside "involution" (Chinese: 内卷; pinyin: nèijuǎn), a term for competition that intensifies while the rewards stay flat or shrink.

== Origins ==
The term first appeared on the Chinese Internet around February 2020, near the start of the COVID-19 pandemic. It gained momentum in April 2021 when Luo Huazhong, posting as "Kind-Hearted Traveler," published an essay on Baidu Tieba titled "Lying Flat is Justice."

Luo, a former factory worker from Jiande in Zhejiang, described leaving his job in 2016, cycling roughly 2,100 km (1,300 mi) from Sichuan to Tibet, and living frugally on odd jobs and about US$60 a month from his savings.

In the essay he likened himself to the Greek philosophers Diogenes and Heraclitus, and presented lying flat as a considered philosophical stance.

Luo's post spread on Sina Weibo and Douban, where discussion groups formed around the idea before some were removed. Supporters described lying flat as a response to a competitive labor market, long hours, and housing costs that made conventional success feel unattainable.

== Background ==
In April 2021, a truck driver committed suicide due to fines and the impoundment of his vehicle, which sparked widespread discussion on the internet about the hardships of life at the grassroots level. Despite official emphasis on "poverty alleviation success" and the narrative of achieving a "moderately prosperous society," his death drew attention to the lack of significant improvement, and even decline, in labor conditions amidst the rapid pace of social development. The exacerbation of domestic social problems in mainland China due to the COVID-19 pandemic in 2019 also played a role. Some commentators argue that similar incidents are commonplace and that the working class has not truly benefited from rapid economic growth.

In May 2021, due to changes in population structure, the government of the People's Republic of China announced the introduction of a three-child policy. However, some analysts believe that many young people today face challenges such as long working hours, stagnant wages, difficulties with homeownership, mental and physical exhaustion, and heavy burdens of caring for older people, leading to a widespread decline in the willingness to marry and have children.

From April to May 2021, a video circulated on the video-sharing website Bilibili featuring a speech by well-known media personality Bai Yansong. When asked about the phenomenon of contemporary young people feeling patriotic and optimistic about the country's future while also feeling powerless in the face of life and employment pressures, Bai Yansong responded with a rhetorical question: "Do we now expect housing prices to be low, jobs to be easy to find everywhere, no pressure at all, and as long as you pursue the girl you like, she will agree?" This statement sparked a barrage of criticism and ridicule from numerous netizens.

== Official responses ==
The Chinese Communist Party (CCP) moved quickly to reject the idea. The Cyberspace Administration of China ordered online platforms to "strictly restrict" posts on tang ping and had censors remove Luo's original Tieba post while a discussion group of nearly 10,000 followers on Chinese social media site Douban is no longer accessible. Selling tang ping-branded merchandise online is forbidden.

In May 2021, Chinese state media Xinhua published an editorial asserting that "lying flat" is shameful. In May, a video clip of CCTV news commentator Bai Yansong criticizing the low-key mindset circulated on the popular video-sharing website Bilibili, and had attracted thousands of mockeries and slurs on the danmu commentaries in response. The same month, a commentary of Hubei Radio and Television Economic Channel said, "you can accept your fate, but you mustn't lie flat." An October article by CCP general secretary Xi Jinping, published in the Communist Party journal Qiushi, called for "avoiding 'involution' [nei juan] and 'lying flat'".

Some official voices were more sympathetic, even as others pressed the criticism. Guangming Daily added that tang ping should not be discounted without reflection, suggesting that a government wanting to cultivate diligence in the young should first improve their quality of life. Huang Ping, a literature professor who researches youth culture at East China Normal University, told Sixth Tone that official media outlets may be concerned about the tang ping lifestyle because of its potential to threaten productivity, but "humans aren't merely tools for making things... when you can't catch up with society's development—say, skyrocketing home prices—tang ping is actually the most rational choice."

On April 28, 2026, the Ministry of State Security (MSS) published a video on its WeChat channel describing lying flat as a campaign of ideological infiltration by hostile anti-China forces aimed at Chinese youth. The video was met with widespread derision and disappointment on social media in China.

== Comments ==
=== Negative comments ===
In May 2021, Sina Weibo's "Communist Youth League Central Committee" posted a Weibo message stating that "contemporary young people have never chosen to lie flat." The Nanfang Daily published a commentary article titled "Lying flat is shameful, where does the sense of justice come from?" by Wang Qingfeng, which criticized the "lying flat philosophy," condemning it as harmful and "toxic chicken soup". This article was reposted by Xinhua News Agency. The Guangming Daily's "Guangming Commentary" column criticized the "lying flat" phenomenon in an article titled "Rejecting 'involution,' are young people starting to believe in 'lying flat-ology'?". A commentary from the TV Economic Channel of Hubei Radio and Television stated: "Accepting fate is okay, lying flat is not". The Global Times' "Global Times Sharp Commentary" column sarcastically said: "Young people who claim to lie flat are always woken up at dawn by the alarm clocks they set themselves".

Li Fengliang, an associate professor at Tsinghua University, believes that "lying flat is an extremely irresponsible attitude that not only disappoints one's parents but also millions of taxpayers. ... People can still achieve upward social mobility through competition."

On December 27, 2021, the Guangming Daily published a commentary on its front page titled "Lying Flat is Not Advisable," rejecting the behavior of lying flat.

=== Positive comments ===
Financial scholar He Jiangbing believes that lying flat is a kind of "helpless activism". Although it will harm the economy, reducing consumption helps reduce waste and carbon footprint, which is conducive to achieving carbon emission reduction targets. People who "lie flat" are usually very gentle, not rebellious, and tend not to retaliate against society, which helps maintain stability. He believes that it is unreasonable to accuse young people of lying flat as decadent, and that a rigid hierarchy and a lack of fair competition are the real decadence. "Lying flat" can be extended to describe a state of inaction with low desire, low social participation, and not catering to secular expectations or mainstream views, to resist or withdraw from formulaic social norms (but not anti-social).

On August 3, 2021, former CIA employee and NSA contractor Edward Snowden posted on Twitter, sharing the song "Lying Flat is King", and encouraged young people to "never forget that you are not alone: the exploitation of the emerging generation is a global struggle."

Huang Ping, a professor in the Department of Chinese at East China Normal University, believes that "lying flat" is a way for young people to put down their burdens. When people cannot keep up with the distorted development of society (such as soaring housing prices), "lying flat" is not a bad choice as the most rational option, and the official media's attention to this trend is due to concerns that the lying flat philosophy may pose a potential threat to productivity. There is also a view that although "lying flat" is only an emotional social response, it also poses new issues for the healthy development of society, such as how to improve the working environment and career development ecology of young people.

Columnist Chang Ping commented that "lying flat-ism" is "an awakening of rights consciousness and identity consciousness." Sinologist Mieke Matthyssen further describes tangping as a "courageous resistance" that expresses a desire for a mentally healthy lifestyle and balanced personal development. It is a form of "self-preservation" against the harmful inputs of excessive materialism and submissive citizenship.

=== Analysis of the phenomenon ===
In a post in May 2021, Guangming Net stated that lying flat is a common phenomenon across a wide range of countries and regions. An economy possesses a certain security function and diversified economic opportunities when it reaches the climax of a state, so the marginal utility of working overtime decreases, resulting in a passive young generation.

According to the BBC, the serial popularity of "Geyou Lying Down" to "Lazy eggs" to "mourning culture" signals the increasing pressure on the younger generation, who grew up under the single-child policy, to work longer hours, abide by the social credit system, and show their patriotism.

On June 9, 2021, the British newspaper The Independent identified Lying Flat as an online protest by young people in China, an extension of similar movements around the world that call for rest and recovery rather than busyness. Business Insider and The Washington Post reported on the issue and interviewed several young people who practice reclinism.

According to The New York Times, lying flat happens in the US too. It's a movement that individuals are embracing, lying flat as a way to resist the expectations of relentless productivity and career success. It highlights economic inequality, limited job opportunities, and a sense of disillusionment with the traditional path of working long hours as factors contributing to the rise of the lying flat movement. Lying flat represents a rejection of the idea that one's job or economic status solely determines one's worth. Instead, it reflects a desire for a simpler, more fulfilling life that prioritizes personal well-being over material success.

In NTV NEWS24, Morimoto Hayashi believes that the popularity of the "lying flat" movement contrasts sharply with the philosophy of striving advocated repeatedly by the leadership of the Chinese Communist Party, such as "the new era is the era of struggle." This news has garnered thousands of responses on Japanese websites, resonating with many Japanese netizens.

Some believe that the official concern and criticism of the trend stem from its ideological connotation of non-cooperation, which is considered a potential threat to stability.

== Similar concepts ==
=== Quiet quitting ===
The phrase "quiet quitting", meaning doing only what one's job demands and nothing more, which became popular in the United States in 2022 primarily due to the evolving landscape of work culture influenced by the COVID-19 pandemic. As the pandemic reshaped the way people worked, with remote and hybrid models becoming more common, individuals began to reassess their priorities and work-life balance. It was thought to be inspired by the tang ping movement. Another newer related phrase is bai lan (Chinese: 摆烂; pinyin: bǎi làn; lit. 'let it rot'), which means "to actively embrace a deteriorating situation, rather than trying to turn it around". Basically, it refers to a voluntary retreat from pursuing certain goals because individuals realize they are simply too difficult to achieve.

It has been seen as a rejection of the hustle-culture mentality long associated with career success and corporate ladder climbing. It showcases the stance that employers can no longer extract and exploit more employee labor than they are paying for.

=== Sampo generation ===
Sampo generation is also referred to as "Three giving-up generation", a neologism in South Korea referring to a generation that gives up courtship, marriage, and having kids due to the excess stress they face in life, including high cost of living, high working hours, low income, and high unemployment rate.

The term evolved into Opo generation (Five giving-up generation), Chilpo generation (Seven giving-up generation), Gupo generation (Nine giving-up generation), and N-po generation, which is people giving up on more things, including employment, home ownership, interpersonal relationships, hope, health, physical appearance, and eventually life.

=== Freeter ===
Freeter is a term used in Japan to describe a person aged 15 to 34 who is unemployed, underemployed, or otherwise lacks full-time paid employment. The term excludes homemakers and students.

Freeter have become a culture in Japan where they accommodate low-waged and marginalized workers to live and enjoy basic activities of life. The culture is evident in Koenji, Tokyo, where there are second-hand shops and recycled objects, and bars with low, affordable prices in the area, reflecting an alternative way of living.

=== NEET ===
NEET (Not in Education, Employment, or Training) is a term describing a state where a person is unemployed and not receiving an education or vocational training. The classification originated in the United Kingdom in the late 1990s. The use of term has spread, in varying degrees, to other countries, including Japan, South Korea, China, Serbia, Canada, and the United States.

== See also ==
- Doomer – Person pessimistic or fatalistic about global problems
- Hikikomori
- Satori generation
- Wu wei
- Turn on, tune in, drop out
- Sanhe Gods
- Hell Joseon
- Downshifting (lifestyle)
