= Toyoko kids =

Youth group in Tokyo, Japan

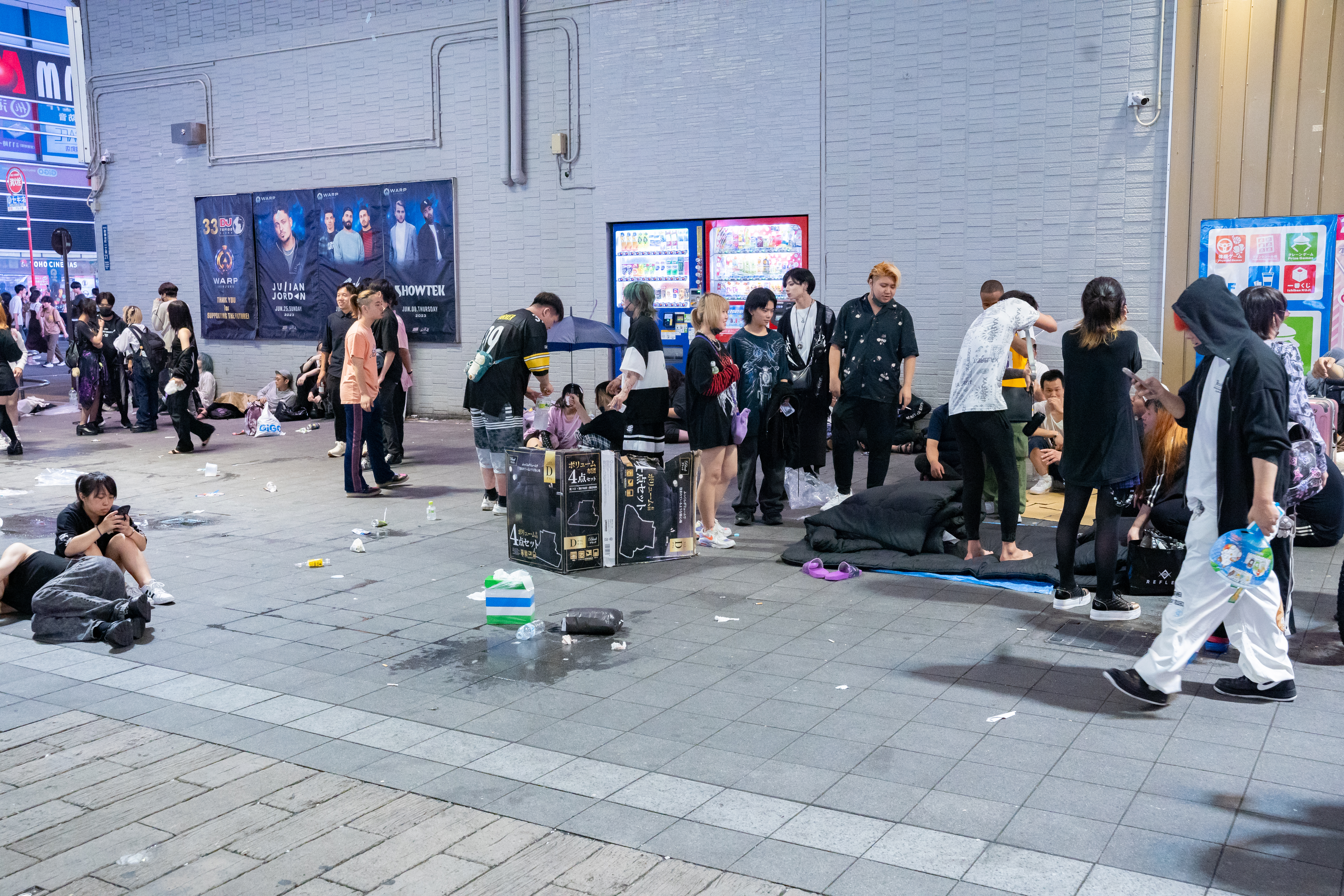
A group of Toyoko Kids in Kabukicho Cinecity Square

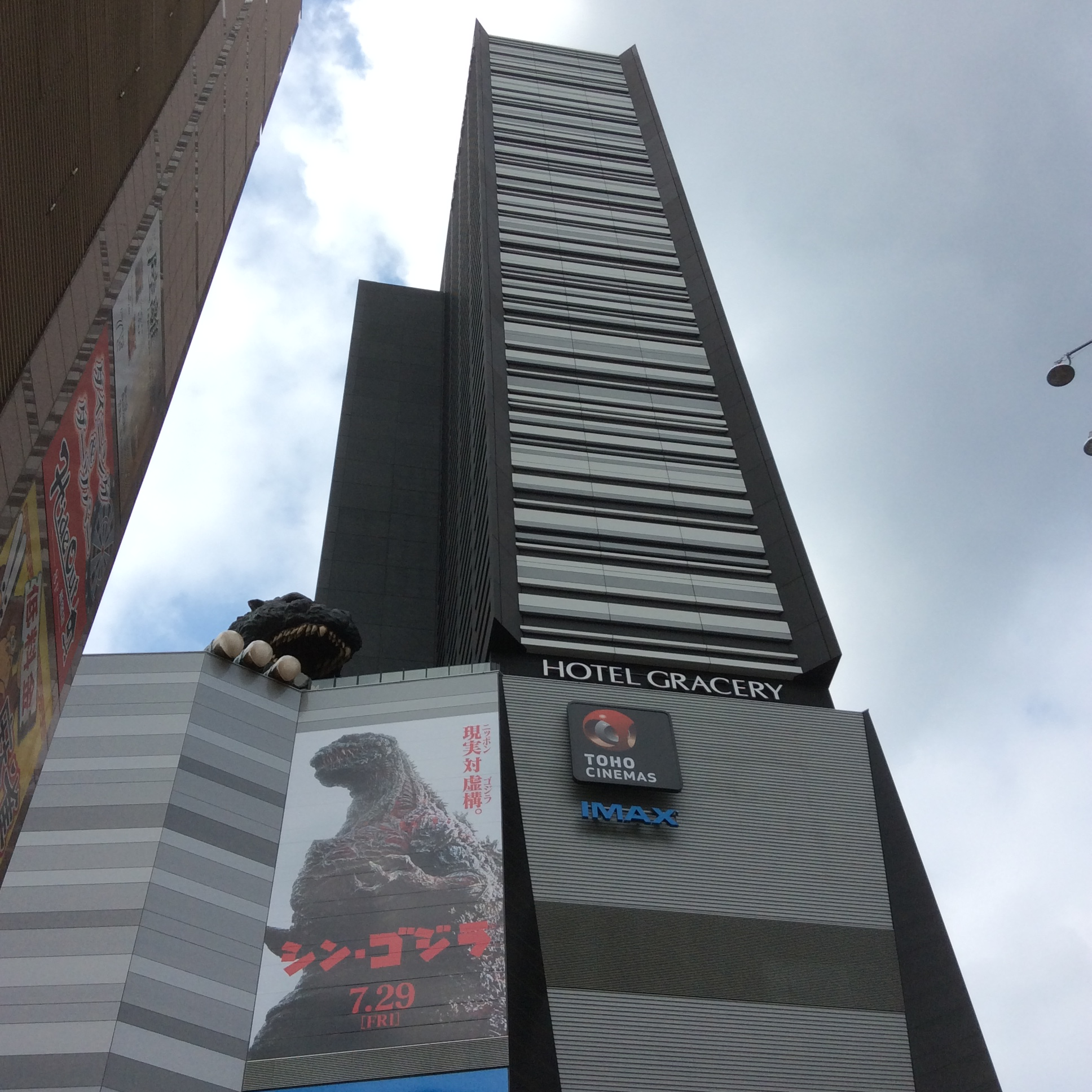
Shinjuku Toho Building (新宿東宝ビル)

Tōyoko kids (Japanese: トー横キッズ) is a Japanese term describing marginalized youth, including some homeless, who gather in the back alleys around the Shinjuku Toho Building (新宿東宝ビル) in Kabukicho. Tōyoko kids are a mix of permanent runaways and those seeking community after experiencing bullying.

== Etymology and definition ==
"Tō-yoko" (東横) is an abbreviation meaning "next to Shinjuku Toho Building". "Tō-yoko" originally referred to the alleys on the east side of the Toho Building, but the meaning has expanded to refer to the entire surrounding area, including Cinema City Plaza on the west side. The Shinjuku Toho Building, featuring the distinctive Godzilla head, opened in 2015.

== Characteristics ==
They have formed a unique youth subculture based around shared neglect, internet-driven popularity and a distinct fashion sense (often wearing Jirai kei clothing). Some Toyoko kids work in the nightlife and sex industries to make a living.

The area became popular for young people taking selfies within a few years. Following the COVID-19 pandemic in Japan, there was an increase in the number of teenagers in the area. Since many young people, including minors, were hanging out there, the staff of nearby izakayas and adult entertainment establishments, sex workers, and club hostesses began calling them "Toyoko Kids."

Toyoko kids include not only natives of Tokyo, but also disadvantaged youth from as far as Osaka and Nagoya.

== Similar groupings ==
Similar disadvantaged youth communities exist in other Japanese cities, such as the "Bibu-yoko Neighborhood" around Yokohama Station, "Gurishita Kids" under the Glico sign in Dōtonbori, Osaka, Kego Park in Tenjin, Fukuoka and Susukino in Sapporo.

== Government efforts ==
The Tokyo government opened a youth consultation center in Kabukicho in May 2024 and is struggling to maintain a secure environment there.

== See also ==
- Homelessness in Japan
- Poverty in Japan
- NEET
- Hikikomori
- Net café refugee
- Enjo kōsai
- McRefugee
- Freeter
- Parasite single
