= Net café refugee =

Homeless person in Japan sheltering in a 24-hour café

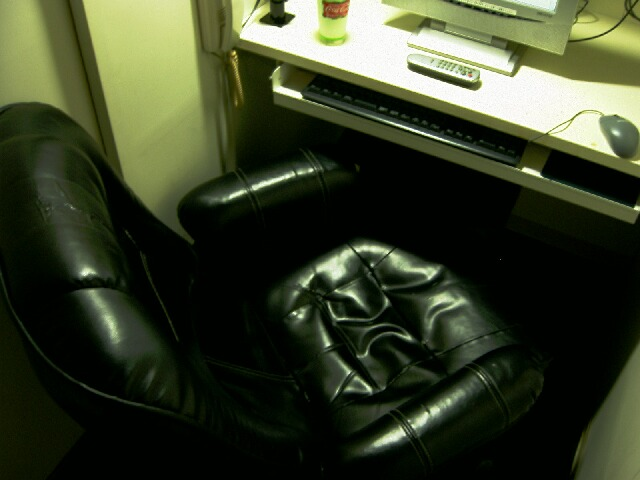
A cubicle at an internet café

Net café refugees (ネットカフェ難民, netto kafe nanmin), also known as cyber-homeless (サイバーホームレス, saibā hōmuresu), are a class of homeless people in Japan who do not own or rent a residence (thus having no permanent address) and sleep in 24-hour Internet cafés or manga cafés. Although such cafés originally provided only Internet services, some have expanded their services to include food, drink, and showers. The term was coined in 2007 by a Nippon News Network documentary show NNN Document. The net café refugee trend has seen large numbers of people using them as their homes. The shifting definition of the industry partly reflects the dark side of the Japanese economy, whose precarity has been noted since the downfall of the national economy that has lasted for decades.

== Prevalence ==
A Japanese government study estimated that in 2007, over 5,400 people were spending at least half of their week staying in net cafés. It has been alleged that this phenomenon is part of an increasing wealth gap in Japan, which has historically boasted of having an economically equal society.

A cultural anthropological perspective suggests that net cafe refugee is one of the phenomena that arose amid Japan's "Lost Decades" associated with the 1989 Bubble Burst and the 2011 Triple Disaster that left a long-lasting sense of "precarity." Alongside other youth crises like freeter and irregular employment, net cafe refugee can be seen as exemplifying the collective insecurity and hopelessness shared among the contemporary Japanese society.

As of 2020, it was estimated 15,000 people stay overnight in internet cafés in Tokyo. The vast majority of net café refugees are young men. Most net café refugees are urban working class, driven to an unstable form of residence by the high cost of living amid the long-term economic difficulties in Japan.

The closure of internet cafés during the COVID-19 pandemic in Japan made the homelessness problem more obvious. The coronavirus-related coverage of net café refugees address that the 24-hour feature of net cafés and manga cafés was originally used by businesspeople, but these venues turned into shelters for the urban poor, and the closure due to the pandemic is driving them homeless, even more literally.

== Economics ==
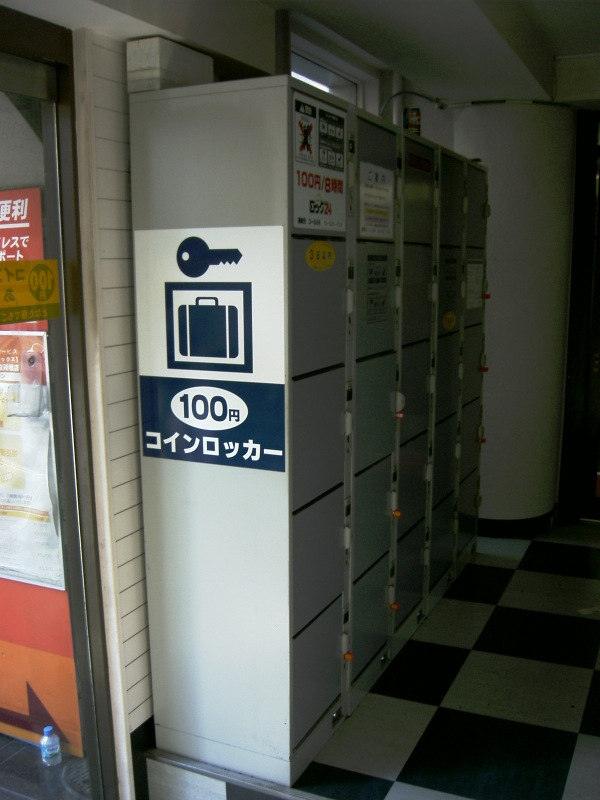
A coin locker in Japan, costing 100 yen per day

According to the Japanese government survey, the homeless staying have little interest in manga or the Internet, and are instead using the place because of the low price relative to any of the competition for temporary housing, business hotels, capsule hotels, hostels, or any other option besides sleeping on the street. It was also estimated that about half of those staying have no job, while the other half work in low-paid temporary jobs, which paid around 100,000 yen per month – lower than what is needed to rent an apartment and pay for transportation in a city like Tokyo.

While net cafés basically charge hourly rates, most venues promote overnight packages with discounts. The price varies by cities, but 6- or 9-hour packages typically cost around 2,000 yen (roughly $14 USD as of 2024). Compared to capsule hotels and dormitories (around 3,500 yen) and business hotels, the relatively cheap price made net cafés an attractive "housing option." Although they are not officially considered as accommodation facilities, their hostel-like function has taken over their primary purposes, internet service and manga. One net café franchise's name "Net Maru" exemplifies this shifting paradigm of the entire industry, a compound word of net (ネット, netto) and stay (泊まる, tomaru).

== Facilities ==
Some internet cafés offer free showers and sell underwear and other personal items, enabling net café refugees to use the internet cafés like a hotel or hostel. Most venues offer complimentary soft drinks and soup varieties at the lounge, and some venues sell a wide variety of restaurant-quality food items, that are likely sold by family restaurants in Japan.

Net cafés offer different seat types at different rates. Seats range from a regular chair, a reclining chair in booth, and a flat seat in booth (フラット, furatto). In addition to the night package and accommodations, this implies that the industry is expanding in accordance with the constant demand of net cafe refugees. In sum, the industry is moving away from its original intention and trying to attract customers with low budget, just like hotels and hostels.

== Cyber-homeless ==
Another word for Net café refugees is cyber-homeless, a Japanese word based on English. Typically, the cyber-homeless are unemployed or underemployed and cannot afford to rent even the cheapest apartment, which is more than the cost per month to rent an internet booth daily. The cyber-homeless may even use the address of the internet café on resumes when applying for jobs to conceal their present form of accommodation.

The fee of around ¥1400 to ¥2400 yen for a night – which may include free soft drinks, TV, comics and internet access – is less than for capsule hotels. Some cyber-homeless may also be freeters. To elaborate, the low income earned through their unstable freeter labor hinders them from settling in traditional forms of residence and drives them to net cafés, contrary to their initial purpose as temporary stations.

== See also ==
- Boomerang Generation
- Lost Decade
- McRefugee
- NEET
- Twixter
