= McRefugee =

Person staying overnight in a 24-hour McDonald's restaurant

McRefugee is a neologism and McWord referring to those who stay overnight in a 24-hour McDonald's fast food restaurant.

The term was coined in Japanese as makku nanmin (マック難民). That term had been largely replaced by nettokafe nanmin (ネットカフェ難民), literally "net café refugee". In Japan, most McDonald's restaurants are operated around the clock. McRefugees in Japan were reportedly mostly day laborers and some high school aged teenagers who chose to stay at McDonald's restaurants overnight as a cheaper alternative to net cafés.

The phenomenon and word spread to Hong Kong as mahk naahn màhn (麥難民), where some McRefugees play video games and are known as McGamers. McDonald's opened 24-hour branches in mainland China in September 2006, which quickly attracted McRefugees.

In early October 2015, the death of a woman in a 24-hour Hong Kong McDonald's restaurant in Kowloon Bay brought attention to the phenomenon of McRefugees. McRefugees can be found in other 24-hour branches as well. Among the more than 1,600 homeless people in Hong Kong in 2015, about 250 were McRefugees.

In 2018, a study conducted by the Society for Community Organization found that there were 384 McRefugees in Hong Kong. In August of the same year, a movie concerning about this topic started to film in Hong Kong, with the title I'm Livin' It, mimicking the slogan of the restaurant, "I'm loving it".

== See also ==
- Homelessness in Japan
- Hikikomori
- NEET
