= Work, Achievement, Values & Education =

- Location: United States

Work, Achievement, Values & Education, Inc. (WAVE) was a nonprofit, youth development, education, and youth workforce development organization founded in 1969 in Newark, Delaware. The organization announced its dissolution in December 2009.

== Background ==
Under its original name, 70,001 Ltd., the organization operated the 70,001 Career Association (SEVCA) and seeded programs in multiple states that reconnected school dropouts to work and education with funds from the US Department of Labor. In the 1980s, WAVE also began working with schools to design methods for effective dropout prevention. 700 schools and community-based organizations serving approximately 700,000 youth eventually implemented such programs.

- UT Knoxville WAVE Program based in Tennessee

WAVE provided professional development, curriculum, technical assistance, and other supports to schools and youth programs that implemented WAVE programs locally. WAVE offered five main program approaches that any school or organization can adapt and implement:

- WAVE In Middle Grades, for students in grades 6-8, usually in a classroom setting
- WAVE In Schools, for high school students, usually in a classroom setting
- WAVE 9th Grade Academy, for ninth graders in schools with an Academy system
- WAVE After School, for middle school or high school students in a setting outside of school time
- WAVE In Communities, a program model for school dropouts in a community-based setting

WAVE is featured in Grad Nation: A Guidebook to Help Communities Tackle The Dropout Crisis as a provider of program designs for out-of-school youth (dropouts) and a research-based intervention for disconnected youth and a national provider of technical assistance to schools and communities wishing to improve the educational and career outcomes of young people. WAVE was a national partner in the America's Promise.

Eight independent research studies have been published on WAVE's impact. Key Findings noted by Michael Ben-Avie, PhD of the Yale Child Study Center and Impact Analysis and Strategies Group in 2008 include evidence that:

1. Participation in a WAVE program makes students more likely to make academic gains, stay in school, and secure employment.
2. Participation in a WAVE program stretches youth's orientation to the future, making youth more likely to plan for their future.
3. As a result of participation in a WAVE program, youth who were once "disconnected" from school and community begin to seek more adult guidance and feel a sense of belonging
4. WAVE programs promote leadership skills that poorly performing students need to defy negative predictions that have been made about their futures.
5. The more hours of WAVE instruction that students complete, the more likely they are to advance to the next grade level.
6. Teachers and school administrators observe that WAVE participation is essential to the developmental growth of their students.
7. WAVE programs demystify the world of work.
8. WAVE programs deliver content relevant to the lives of young people in a challenging but safe and supportive learning environment. written in 2006 by Civic Enterprises for the Bill and Melinda Gates Foundation, cites this as a key precursor to keeping adolescents engaged in school.

WAVE was featured in the Catalogue for Philanthropy, which reviews and selects charitable organizations that meet criteria for efficiency, effectiveness, transparency, impact, and value to the community.

== Notable Founders and Alumni of the Board of Directors ==
Dr. George Mc Gorman, Executive Director of the Delaware Governor's Advisory Council for Vocational originated the concept of 70001.

- Pierre Samuel "Pete" du Pont, IV
- Joe Biden
- William G. McGowan
- Jose Rivera, Principal, McClure Elementary School
- Bill Brock
- Frank Rooney, founder of the Thom McCan show company
- Roger D. Semerad [Assistant Secretary of Labor for Education and Training]
- Doug Williams (American football), NFL quarterback
- Maxine Coleman, retired, Mars, Incorporated
- Paul Graves, Schering-Plough
