= Leaving the nest =

Moving out of parents' home

Leaving the nest is an idiom for the act of moving out of the housing provided by one's parents or guardians, often considered as part of the transition from adolescence to adulthood. The phrase is based on the idea that a bird leaves its nest after it has fledged or has become developed enough to be independent.

Leaving the nest can be categorized into three conceptual groups:

- Family dependence – lives dependently with own or spouse's parents, or with relative(s) other than a parent
- Non-family living – lives away from parents, either alone or with non-relatives
- Family independence – lives away from parents with persons whom they have established new adult family or quasi-family roles

The age at which young people move out of their previous accommodation has been rising since the turn of the 21st century. Even so, there are differences of opinion on when, where, and who should be leaving the nest. In certain cultures, more so in Eastern societies, it is not socially acceptable for women to leave the home, if not for marriage.

== Reasons for leaving the nest ==
In a 1987 survey, young people identified their reasons for leaving the nest, which seemed to be of either social or financial nature. The top reasons included marriage, co-habitation, education, independence, inter-family conflict, and employment. The study also shows that gender and region have an influence on young people leaving the nest. People who still resided at home were also surveyed on their reasoning for not leaving the nest. The top reasons identified were; prefer to live with parents, lack of money, age (too young), are planning on leaving soon, and to help parents.

== Effects of leaving the nest ==
Leaving the nest can have several different outcomes depending on the situation. For many, leaving the nest is a chance to experience new things and meet new people; either good or bad. It is also the first time a young person may experience having responsibilities or practice adulting. It is shown that leaving the nest can be attributed to the decrease in the amount of marriages. Some cases of leaving the nest may result in failure to launch, in which the young person faces difficulties or does not have the necessary resources to succeed upon leaving.

== "On time" nest leavers vs late nest leavers ==
There is research done on the differences in the lives of people who leave the nest early on, compared to those who leave later. "On time" nest leavers tend to be more securely attached, as well as have higher autonomy. As for those who left the nest later on, they tend to show more insecure attachment styles and have lower rates of involvement in romantic relationships. Some researchers have suggested that a delay in leaving the nest may result in a decrease in sexual activity. The time at which a young person leaves also affects the relationship between the parent and child. Late nest leavers are more likely to maintain higher levels of interaction between family members compared to on time nest leavers.
