= Godzilla Street =

Street in Kabukichō, Shinjuku, Tokyo, Japan

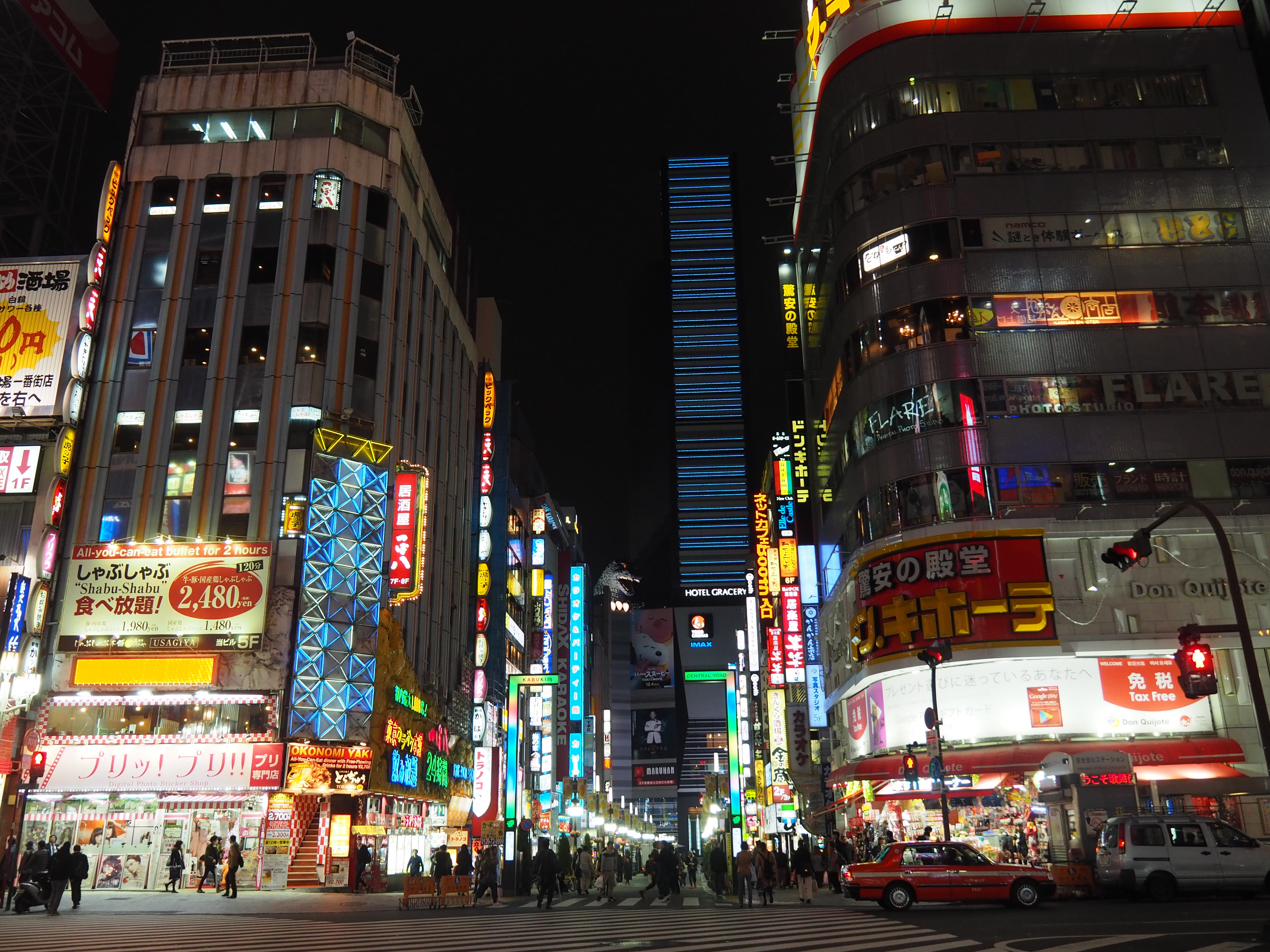
- The street at night in 2015
- Interactive map of Godzilla Street
- Namesake: Godzilla
- Location: Tokyo

Godzilla Street, officially known as Central Road, is a street named after Godzilla in Kabukichō, Shinjuku, Tokyo, Japan.

== See also ==
- Godzilla head
- Godzilla in popular culture
- Shinjuku Toho Building
