= Failure to launch =

Concept related to young emerging adults

Failure to launch informally refers to dependent young emerging adults who are unsuccessful in transitioning into societal requirements of adulthood. Characterization of this group in some Western societies includes those living with and reliant on their parents, those with an avoidance of higher education, and those unable to contribute financially through employment. Given the large variation within Western countries with regard to acceptable living with parents and other interpretations of adulthood, failure to launch has been considered as oversimplified or insufficient terminology.

== Definition ==
The term is associated with the elongation of the period of emerging adults. That is, there is a "delay" in "transition of young adults from parental dependence to economic self-sufficiency" according to Bell et al. Failure to launch, or FTL, has been used for "adult children living at home and highly dependent on parents". Over-simplistic narratives of this colloquialism and stereotype have been critically challenged. The expression has been used as a non-pejorative. It is not a medical "syndrome" or clinical condition.

== Causes ==
There is a lack of research on the topic. A number of psychological reasons, individual choices and economic reasons have been postulated. Some early signals include social avoidance, acute introversion and lack of engagement with responsibilities. Some causes suggested are parents and children falling into the "dependency trap" or "accommodation trap", that of reinforcing a young adult's dependency by providing accommodation. Parents also have a role to play in the transition to adulthood.

== Failure to launch at inflection points ==
A "delay" in the transition of young adults occurs when a transition is expected: from high school to university, or from university to career. A high school graduate who fails in college, or refuses to go to college, is unwilling or unable to make the transition. A university graduate who has difficulty making the change to the working world may lack the needed skills or confidence.

One approach that has been suggested is the structured gap year for young adults. Gap years have been shown to improve outcomes for high-achieving medical students.

== Similar concepts ==
An acute version of this is hikikomori in Japan. According to a Japanese Ministry of Health, Labour, and Welfare guideline, hikikomori is "a situation where a person without psychosis is withdrawn into his/her home for more than six months and does not participate in society such as attending school and/or work". Boomerang children is a term for those who have returned home after leaving. It has also been referred to as the pop psychological Peter Pan syndrome.

== History ==
Failure to launch, in the context of economic self-sufficiency, was identified in Europe in the 1980s, mainly in Germany and Italy, and to a significantly lesser extent in the United States. An indicator of independence or economic self-sufficiency is identified as those who identify as a "household head". A general decline in headship, that is, a decline in the capacity to form independent households, among young adults was seen in Belgium, Canada, Germany, Italy, the United Kingdom, and the United States from 1984 to 2000. For the first time since the 1880s, living with parents was the most common living arrangement for 18 to 34 year olds in the United States in 2014; according to the Pew Research Center living with parents is becoming more common. The United States is seeing a structural shift through the creation of new phases in the job-learning lifecycle.

== See also ==
- Empty nest syndrome
- Failure to Launch (movie)
- Hikikomori
- NEET
