= Twixter =

Neologism for economically inexperienced young adults

Twixter is a neologism that describes a new generation of young adults in the United States and other industrialized countries who are trapped, in a sense, betwixt (between) adolescence and adulthood. This Western neologism is somewhat analogous to the Japanese term parasite single. The Twixter phenomenon was discussed in the 2005 issue of Time.

== Behavior ==
Twixters are typically young adults who live with their parents or are otherwise not independent financially. If they are employed, they often have unsteady and low-paying jobs. They may have recently left university or high school, or recently embarked on a career.

== Media coverage ==
Time published an article titled "Twixter Generation: Young Adults Who Won't Grow Up" in January 2005, putting this relatively obscure demographic in the spotlight. The article focused on upper- and middle-class Twixters whose parents could support them. The article made no distinction between people who lived on their own with their parents' help and people who lived with their parents, nor did it mention lower-class Twixters similar to NEETs and freeters in other societies.

== Parallels in other societies ==
The emergence of twixters is not entirely new, as it resembles social phenomena observed in other industrialized societies. Since the 1980s and 1990s, Japan has seen the growth of a parasite single or "freeter" segment of the youth population who live at home and work at undemanding jobs. The Hodo-Hodo zoku are employees who avoid promotion to minimize stress and maximize free time. Likewise, in Europe since the 1990s, there has been a growing number of NEET, those "Not engaged in Education, Employment, or Training".

In October 2007, former Minister of Economy and Finance of Italy Tommaso Padoa-Schioppa called people in their twenties and still living with their families bamboccioni ("big, dummy boys"), stirring controversy within the Italian media. Newspapers received numerous letters from readers who took offense and pointed out that he knew little about the situation of a considerable number of twenty-something Italians who live on approximately €1,000 per month and cannot afford to leave their parents' house. A similar case is also seen in Spain, with the term mileurista to describe the youth who live with €1,000 salary (mil euros). In Greece, the minimum salary is €700 and the Greek media popularized the term the "€700 generation". This generation evolved in circumstances leading to the Greek debt crisis and participated in the 2010–2011 Greek protests.

== See also ==
- Boomerang Generation
- Millennials
- Emerging adulthood
- Freeters
- Hikikomori
- NEET
- Parasite single
- Waithood
