= Shinjuku Toho Building =

Building in Kabukichō, Shinjuku, Tokyo, Japan

- 新宿東宝ビル
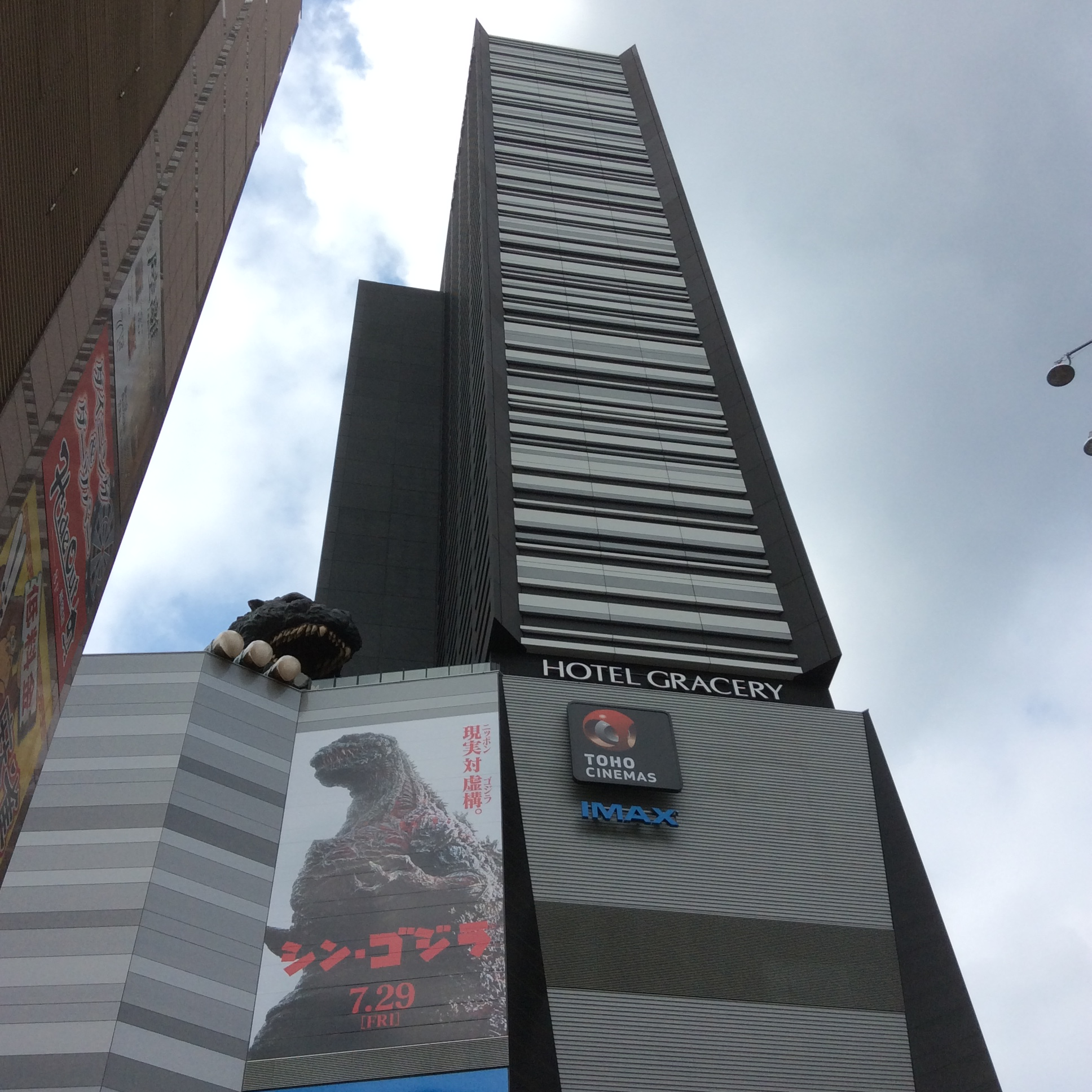
- The building's exterior in 2016, with the Godzilla head statue visible on the building's terrace.
- Interactive map of the Shinjuku Toho Building area

General information
- Type: Building
- Location: Shinjuku, Tokyo, Japan
- Coordinates: 35.695261°N 139.701989°E
- Owner: Toho Co., Ltd

Design and construction
- Architecture firm: Takenaka Corporation
- Developer: Toho Co., Ltd
- Main contractor: Takenaka Corporation

Shinjuku Toho Building (新宿東宝ビル, Shinjuku Tōhō Biru) is a building in Kabukichō, Shinjuku, Tokyo, Japan. It features Toho Cinemas Shinjuku (TOHOシネマズ新宿), a theater run by Toho's subsidiary Toho Cinemas, and the Godzilla head on the terrace of its Hotel Gracery.

== See also ==
- Godzilla Street
- Toyoko kids
