= Poverty in Japan =

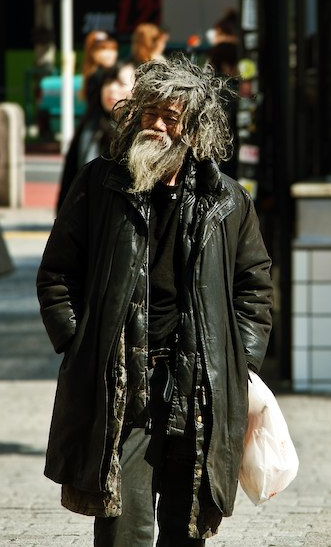
A homeless man in Shibuya, Tokyo

Poverty in Japan is generally measured in relative terms. The Ministry of Health, Labour and Welfare (MHLW), following the methodology of the Organisation for Economic Co-operation and Development (OECD), defines the relative poverty rate as the proportion of people whose equivalised disposable household income is below 50% of the national median.

In the 2022 Comprehensive Survey of Living Conditions, which measured income received in 2021, the relative poverty threshold was ¥1.27 million in annual equivalised disposable income, and the relative poverty rate was 15.4%. The rate was higher than the OECD average of 11.4% in 2021.

The child poverty rate was 11.5% in 2021. Among people in working-age households with children, the poverty rate was 10.6%, rising to 44.5% in households with only one adult.

== Measurement ==
Japan's official statistics on relative poverty use the OECD's income-based definition. The poverty threshold is set at 50% of the median equivalised disposable income. Household disposable income is adjusted for household size by dividing it by the square root of the number of household members; the resulting income is then attributed to each member of the household. The poverty line used in these statistics is therefore a relative income threshold, rather than a fixed amount representing the cost of a prescribed basket of necessities.

== Trends ==
The relative poverty rate rose from 12.0% in 1985 to 16.1% in 2012 before declining to 15.4% in 2021. The child poverty rate followed a similar pattern, rising from 10.9% in 1985 to 16.3% in 2012 and falling to 11.5% by 2021.

Relative poverty rates in Japan
Income year	Relative poverty rate (%)	Child poverty rate (%)
1985	12.0	10.9
1988	13.2	12.9
1991	13.5	12.8
1994	13.8	12.2
1997	14.6	13.4
2000	15.3	14.4
2003	14.9	13.7
2006	15.7	14.2
2009	16.0	15.7
2012	16.1	16.3
2015	15.7	13.9
2018	15.4	13.5
2018	15.7	14.0
2021	15.4	11.5

Source: Ministry of Health, Labour and Welfare, 2022 Comprehensive Survey of Living Conditions.

== Japan's working poor ==
Unlike several other modern countries, Japan has no official poverty line, making it difficult to get accurate figures on those suffering impoverished conditions. Instead Japan measures poverty based on a "minimum standard of living" calculated using median income, the OECD index and other factors differing from prefecture to prefecture. Still, it is estimated that in 2006, when measuring on an individual basis using the Employment Status Survey, that 8.2% of regular employees made little enough to be considered working poor. Several factors have been found to be correlated with the working poor including single-parent households, shortcomings of the Public Assistance System, unstable employment and minimum wage insufficient to cover a minimum standard of living. Irregular workers tend to be members of the working poor and are often the result of Japanese companies restructuring. These workers also tend to be homeless, and reside in areas generally away from the public eye with well known homeless "villages" existing such as Hakenmura, a homeless village compared by scholar Toru Shinoda to the United States' Hooverville. Members of these communities tend to become day laborers, who by their nature are irregular workers.

== Saitama starvation case ==
On February 20, 2012, the death of a family of three people was reported from Saitama due to starvation – an elderly couple and their 39-year-old son. The family could not afford to pay the rent, and electricity had been cut off. Unable to pay for heating, hypothermia is also suspected to be the cause of their death.

== Child poverty ==
With regard to poor children in Japan, it has been estimated that 3.5 million Japanese children – or one in six of those aged up to 17 – belong to households experiencing relative poverty, defined by the OECD as those with incomes at or below half the median national disposable income. However, according to Japan's Health Ministry statistics, as in May 2017, 16 percent of Japanese children live below the poverty line. Japan has some of the highest rates of child poverty in the developed world, according to a Unicef report released in April 2016 that ranked Japan 34th out of 41 industrialised countries. It has also been estimated that only 200,000 of the 3.5 million poor children receive child support.

== See also ==
- Homelessness in Japan
  - Nishinari-ku, Osaka
  - Kamagasaki (former name for a part of Nishinari-ku)
  - Toyoko kids
