= Measure of America =

Organization

- Founded: 2007
- Founders: Sarah Burds-Sharps, Kristen Lewis
- Location: Brooklyn, New York
- Field: Social Sciences
- Website: measureofamerica.org

Measure of America is a non-partisan, non-profit initiative of the Social Science Research Council in Brooklyn, New York. It conducts research and analysis primarily on human development data from the United States at the national, state and county levels.

Measure of America's primary work is the American Human Development Index. Its U.S. specific index is based on human development concepts introduced by Mahbub ul Haq and Amartya Sen.

In partnership with foundations, non-profit organizations, government offices, and corporations, Measure of America has produced reports, interactive tools, and services focused on data analysis and data visualization.

== American Human Development Reports ==
The American Human Development Report (AHDR) was a biennial report on human well-being in the United States produced by Measure of America. It follows the human development concept, which is the process of expanding the well-being of individuals to develop their full potential, by increasing opportunities in the arenas of health, education, and income. Similar to the global Human Development Report, published annually by the United Nations Development Programme, and the National Human Development Reports (NHDRs), the AHDRs served as advocacy tools to spur lively debates and mobilize support for action and change.

=== The Measure of America, 2013–2014 ===
The Measure of America, 2013–2014 was co-authored by Sarah Burd-Sharps and Kristen Lewis. It is the third in the American Human Development Reports series and, like its predecessors, includes updated Index rankings while examining changes in well-being since 2000, as well as before and after the Great Recession. The report provides information for the country as a whole, the 50 U.S. states, the 25 largest metropolitan areas, and racial and ethnic groups within those regions. The report was funded by the Conrad N. Hilton Foundation.

=== The Measure of America, 2010–2011 ===
The Measure of America, 2010–2011: Mapping Risks and Resilience was co-authored by Sarah Burd-Sharps and Kristen Lewis, and includes a foreword by Jeffrey Sachs. The second in the American Human Development Reports series, the 2010–2011 edition features updated Index rankings of the 50 states and 435 congressional districts; reveals huge disparities in the health, education, and the standard of living of different racial and ethnic groups from state to state; and shines a spotlight on disparities within the ten largest metropolitan areas in the country. The report was funded by the Conrad N. Hilton Foundation and The Lincy Foundation, and is a joint publication of the Social Science Research Council and New York University Press.

=== The Measure of America, 2008–2009 ===
The Measure of America: American Human Development Report, 2008–2009 was written, compiled, and edited by Sarah Burd-Sharps, Kristen Lewis, and Eduardo Borges Martins, and includes forewords by Amartya Sen and William H. Draper III. The book is the first-ever human development report for a wealthy, developed nation. It introduced the American HD Index disaggregated by state, by congressional district, by racial/ethnic group, and by gender, creating ranked lists for each. Funding was provided by the Conrad N. Hilton Foundation, Oxfam America, the Social Science Research Council, the Rockefeller Foundation, and the Annenberg Foundation. It was jointly published by the Social Science Research Council and Columbia University Press.

Since the publication of the 2013-2014 volume, the SSRC published "Measuring America: 10 Years and Counting" in 2018.This report looks at trends in how the American Human Development Index scores have changed since the publication of the first AHDR.

== State Human Development Reports ==
=== A Portrait of California ===
Released in May 2011, the California report provides an in-depth look at the well-being of people living in the most populous and the most diverse state in America.

The report presents Human Development Index values for the five largest metro areas in the state as well as for eight economic regions and 233 neighborhood and county groups covering the entire state. American HD Index values for each major racial/ethnic group, for women and men, and for both native and foreign-born Californians were calculated using mortality data from the California Department of Public Health and earnings and education data from the American Community Survey of the U.S. Census Bureau. Following in the mold of state-level reports on Mississippi and Louisiana, the report makes extensive use of Census Bureau-designated Public Use Microdata Areas (referred to as "neighborhood and county groups"), in order to highlight disparities in well-being at the local level.

Preliminary findings provide evidence that some groups in California experience some of the highest levels of well-being and access to opportunity in the nation—indeed, in the world—while others are facing distressing challenges when it comes to the basic building blocks of opportunity. For instance:

- People in the section of Orange County that runs from Newport Beach to Laguna Hills have a life expectancy of about 88 years—fifteen years longer than life expectancy in the Watts neighborhood of Los Angeles (about 73 years).
- In the Los Angeles communities of Bel Air, Brentwood, and Pacific Palisades, nearly all adults (97% and higher) have completed high school, whereas in nearby Vernon-Central, only a little more than one-third of all adults have completed this basic educational qualification.
- Median personal annual earnings range from about $15,000 in the Los Angeles neighborhoods around East Adams and Exposition Park to nearly $73,000 in the Santa Clara communities of Cupertino, Saratoga, and Los Gatos.
- Statewide, men have median personal earnings of $34,099, whereas women bring home significantly less: $25,188.

The California state report is supported by the California Community Foundation, the Conrad N. Hilton Foundation, the Draper Foundation, the California Endowment, The Lincy Foundation, the San Francisco Foundation, United Way of California, and the Weingart Foundation.

=== A Portrait of Louisiana ===
Louisiana ranked near the bottom of the American Human Development Index and has gained attention in recent years in the wake of Hurricane Katrina. On September 17, 2009, Measure of America released A Portrait of Louisiana: Louisiana Human Development Report 2009, the first major research effort into health, education, and income in the state to use post-Katrina data. Among the findings, the report concludes that acute human vulnerability persists, as do profound disparities between certain groups, especially between blacks and whites. The report was commissioned by Oxfam America and the Louisiana Disaster Recovery Foundation, with funding from Oxfam America and the Foundation for the Mid South.

=== A Portrait of Mississippi ===
Mississippi ranked last among U.S. states on the American Human Development Index in 2008–2009. The Mississippi State Conference NAACP commissioned Measure of America to apply the methodology of the national report to the state level. A Portrait of Mississippi: Mississippi Human Development Report 2009 was released on January 26, 2009. The report revealed that some groups in the state enjoy well-being levels similar to those in top-ranked Connecticut, while others experience levels of human development typical of the average American nearly a half-century ago. The report contains policy recommendations to address disparities by geography, race, and gender.

== County Human Development Reports ==
=== A Portrait of Marin ===
Released on January 18, 2012, A Portrait of Marin provides an investigation of well-being in Marin County, California, and highlights actions that Marinites can take to lock in human development successes today while setting the stage for significant budget savings and improved well-being tomorrow.

Some residents of Marin are enjoying extraordinarily high levels of well-being and access to opportunity, while others are experiencing levels of health, education, and standard of living that prevailed in the nation three decades ago. At the top of the rankings is Ross (HDI: 9.70), with the Canal area of San Rafael scoring the lowest (HDI: 3.18), below that of West Virginia, the lowest-ranked state. Rankings are provided for the major racial and ethnic groups, men and women, native- and foreign-born residents, and Marin’s fifty-one census tracts for which there are reliable U.S Census data.

Select findings from the report illustrate these disparities:

- The average Ross resident lives nearly eight years longer than the average Californian and an astonishing decade longer than the national average.
- While 88 percent of white children are enrolled in preschool, only 47 percent of Latino children are.
- The distribution of income in Marin is exceedingly lopsided; the top fifth of Marin taxpayers take home about 71 percent of the county’s total income. The bottom fifth earns 1.3 percent of the total income.

The Marin County report was commissioned by the Marin Community Foundation (MCF).

=== A Portrait of Sonoma ===
Released May 20, 2014, A Portrait of Sonoma County provides an in-depth look at how residents of Sonoma County are faring in three fundamental areas of life: health, access to knowledge, and living standards.

Select findings from the report include:

- An entire decade separates the life expectancies in the top and bottom census tracts. Those who are born in Kenwood/Glen Ellen can expect to live 75.2 years, while those in Central Bennett Valley average 85.7 years.
- Men in Sonoma County earn about $8,500 more than women. This wage gap is similar to the gap between men and women at the state level, although it is around $1,000 smaller than at the national level.

The Sonoma County report was commissioned by Sonoma County Department of Health Services (DHS).

== Thematic Briefs ==
=== Highway to Health: Life Expectancy in Los Angeles County, 2017 ===
Highway to Health presents life expectancy calculations for cities and unincorporated areas in Los Angeles County as well as for planning areas and city council districts within the City of Los Angeles. These place-based life expectancy calculations are the most up-to-date figures available; calculating life expectancy by place is a complicated exercise, and updated estimates have not been released for over a decade.

Highway to Health was released as a health-focused preview to A Portrait of Los Angeles County. Key findings from the brief include:

- A baby born today in Los Angeles County can expect to live 82.1 years, on average—a longer life expectancy than that of the average Californian or the average American.
- If Los Angeles County were a country, it would rank an impressive eleventh in the world in terms of longevity.
- In some parts of Los Angeles, residents routinely live into their 90s, an astonishing decade longer than the already impressive countywide average; in others, life expectancies in the mid-70s reflect far too many premature deaths.

=== Who Graduates?, 2017 ===
Who Graduates? uses a dataset obtained by special agreement from the NYC Department of Education to look at high school graduation through the lens of types of high school programs students are admitted to. The mandatory high school choice system is a complex, high-stakes process that New York City eighth graders must navigate every year in order to gain admission to high school. The original research informed a New York Times feature story that asked and answered important questions about school choice and how to ensure every student has access to the best education the city has to offer.

Key findings from the brief include:

- A striking 97.4 percent of students admitted to high school based on the SHSAT graduated on time in 2015, compared to only 59.8 percent of those admitted to educational option programs and 68.1 percent of those admitted to limited unscreened programs.
- Overall, 16.6 percent of Asian American students were admitted to specialized high schools; only 1.1 percent of black students and 1.1 percent of Latino students were.
- Well over half of all black and Latino students were admitted to either an educational option or a limited unscreened program, compared to roughly one in five white or Asian students.

This is the second Measure of America report on on-time high school graduation in NYC. The first report, High School Graduation in New York City: Is Neighborhood Still Destiny? (2016), analyzed on-time high school graduation rates for high school students not by the schools they attend, but rather by the neighborhoods they call home.

=== Impact of the US Housing Crisis on the Racial Wealth Gap Across Generations, 2015 ===
In the lead-up to the financial crisis, economic opportunity remained unequal across racial lines, but economic trends suggested that America was on a path toward narrowing the yawning wealth disparities between white and black families. Deeply rooted economic inequality, however, fueled some of the most harmful lending practices in the housing market, allowing financial institutions to engage in discriminatory and predatory lending that accelerated the financial collapse.

Commissioned by the American Civil Liberties Union and drawing on a unique dataset, this report examines the likely effect of the financial crisis on the racial wealth gap for the next generation. What it uncovers is a tale of two recoveries: among families that owned homes, white households have started to rebound from the worst effects of the Great Recession while black households are still struggling to make up lost ground. The racial wealth gap is now on track to compound over time, a trend with urgent implications for the future of racial justice in America, and one that should inform policymaking strategies aimed at guaranteeing fair economic opportunities in the coming years.

- By 2031, white wealth is forecast to be 31 percent below what it would have been without the Great Recession, while black wealth is down almost 40 percent. For a typical black family, median wealth in 2031 will be almost $98,000 lower than it would have been without the Great Recession.
- Without policy actions to remedy it, the racial wealth gap will be significantly greater in the next generation because of the differential impact of the Great Recession.

=== Other Thematic Reports ===
- Retail and Opportunity
- Connecting Youth and Strengthening Communities
- Tales of Two Americas
- 29 Reasons for Optimism
- A Century Apart
- Goals for the Common Good
- State of the Congress 2013
- Women's Well Being

== See also ==
Indices

- Gender-related Development Index
- Genuine Progress Indicator (GPI)
- Human Development Index (HDI)
- Millennium Development Goals (MDGs)
- OECD Better Life Index (BLI)

Other

- Human Development and Capability Association
- List of U.S. states by American Human Development Index
- Disconnected youth
