= Young night drifters =

Adolescents loitering at night in Hong Kong

Young Night Drifters (abbreviated YNDs; Chinese: 青少年深宵外展) is a term used by the Government of Hong Kong to refer to adolescents who loiter at night.

In the past, a YND was defined as a young person (18 and under) loitering outside buildings at night. However, as the number of YNDs was considered insufficient to be served by large scale YND services, people who are over 18 years old are now also classified as YNDs so as to be served by YND services. The Boys' and Girls' Clubs Association of Hong Kong defines the age range of YNDs as being between the ages of six and thirty.

There are three terms to describe particular types of YNDs: one-night stand drifters (who engage in nighttime loitering less than once a week), occasional night drifters (who engage in nighttime loitering more than once a week), and persistent night drifters (who engage in nighttime loitering more than three times a week).

== YNDs as a phenomenon ==
The term YND first originated within Hong Kong academia in the 1990s to describe a perceived trend of youth on the margins of society. A large number of young people tend to loiter at parks at night or even all night long. Most of the night drifters run away from their families and prefer to be with their friends. As the YNDs usually wander in parks or streets at night, they become involved with triad. Many of them drop out of school and spend their time vandalising, chasing around, petting publicly, harassing public transport passengers and participating in the use of recreational drugs. Those behaviours happen frequently and thus create much public concern. Studies show that the number of YNDs has been increasing starting from 2008. These studies reveal that the YNDs tend to commit high-risk crimes as well. More and more news reports are surfacing concerning the misbehavior of YNDs in 2013. Those issues reflect the loosening control and supervision of families and schools.

== Social background ==
The social background of the YNDs in Hong Kong is quite different from similar delinquent youth in other countries. Rather than suffering a bad family background, many of the YNDs come from non-violent, non-divorced families. However, many of them claim that their parents are apathetic and that there is a lack of communication and caring in their families. Unlike the findings in previous studies, new research has shown that YNDs are not socially isolated, but instead tend to have close friends who belong to the same night drifting group. Many YNDs described their friends as caring and supportive, which suggests that lack of caring in the family may contribute to the night drifting behaviour. Regarding their education level, most YNDs are recently finished with junior secondary schooling. Most of them have dropped out of school, but a small minority are still attending school. Some YNDs have previously admitted that their academic performance is poor and that their relationships with teachers have been strained. As for those who are not receiving education, some are unemployed and some are working as unskilled workers. It is common for them to change jobs within a short period of time.

== Motivations for becoming a YND ==
The main causes of teenagers becoming YNDs can be divided into peer pressure and family system. With peer influence-related reasons, company with other YND friends and seeking entertainment are major causes of them being YNDs. In family-related reasons, the parents of the YNDs are seldom home at night, or some of the drifters suffer from domestic violence. Thus, the YNDs stay in the street during night to avoid feeling lonely or bored at home and avoiding conflicts and punishments.

== Places to stay ==
As public places generally do not need permission to enter, YNDs generally congregate at these establishments. Also, there is a lack of supervision by guards or adults. Therefore, 24-hour convenience stores and fast food shops are popular places for YNDs, such as 7-Eleven convenience stores or McDonald's. Because they provide YNDs food, drink, lighting, and seating, many YNDs prefer to stay at public places throughout the night.

Besides convenience stores and the like, leisure playgrounds or football courts are popular sites for YNDs to stay. Unlike stores and shops, there are no staff or workers at playgrounds to interrupt or disturb them. Some of them may bring food and drinks or drugs to these places.

On top of this, YNDs themselves may provide apartments or houses to friends, as they believe these places provide them with a sense of security and comfort.

== Problems posed by YNDs ==
YNDs are the target group of triad cultures. The drifters are exposed to different related problems. Substance abuse, engaging in sex activities or work, thieving, bullying, creating public nuisances and risking personal security are the common problems that drifters face. The crime rate of YNDs is higher than that of general teenagers.

== Services provided to YNDs in Hong Kong ==
The government has extended the service hours and service focus of 18 Integrated Children and Youth Services Centers in 18 districts to provide overnight outreaching service and satisfy the needs of YNDs from September 2001 onwards. In general, the operating hours of Overnight Outreaching Teams are from 10 p.m. to 6 a.m.

=== List of agencies providing services for YNDs ===
(as of June 2013)

- The Neighborhood Advice-Action Council
- Chinese Young Men's Christian Association of Hong Kong
- Jockey Club Integrated Services for Young People
- Hong Kong Playground Association
- Yang Memorial Methodist Social Service
- Hong Kong Christian Service
- The Hong Kong Federation of Youth Groups
- The Boys' and Girls' Clubs Association of Hong Kong
- The Salvation Army
- Hong Kong Sheng Kung Hui Welfare Council
- Hong Kong Children & Youth Services
- Scout Association of Hong Kong The Friends of Scouting
- Evangelical Lutheran Church Social Service
- Youth Outreach Centre of Sai Wan Ho

== See also ==
- Youth in Hong Kong
- Disconnected youth
