= List of U.S. states by American Human Development Index =

A map of the American Human Development Index within the United States (2016) Legend: > 6.0 < 6.0 < 5.5 < 5.0 < 4.5 < 4.0

This article presents a sortable table of U.S. states sorted by their American Human Development Index, according to Measure of America. The data were taken from the American Human Development Report.

The territories of the United States are listed separately (they were not included in Measure of America's report); the territories data is from a different source (based on United Nations Development Programme), which uses a different numbering system.

== States and federal district ==
| Rank | | State/federal district | American HDI | |
| 2014/2015 values for 2014 | Change compared to 2008/2009 values for 2005 | State/federal district | 2014/2015 values for 2014 | Change compared to 2008/2009 values for 2005 |
|---|---|---|---|---|
| 1 | Steady | Massachusetts | 6.18 | ▼0.19 |
| 2 | Steady | Connecticut | 6.17 | ▼0.12 |
| 3 | ▲ (1) | New Jersey | 6.12 | ▼0.02 |
| 4 | ▲ (2) | Minnesota | 6.10 | ▼0.03 |
| 5 | Steady | Maryland | 5.94 | ▼0.05 |
| 6 | ▲ (2) | New Hampshire | 5.73 | ▼0.06 |
| 7 | ▲ (1) | Pennsylvania | 5.72 | ▲0.03 |
| 8 | ▼ (1) | New York | 5.66 | ▼0.15 |
| 9 | ▲ (3) | Colorado | 5.53 | ▼0.05 |
| 10 | ▼ (4) | Hawaii | 5.53 | ▼0.29 |
| 11 | ▼ (2) | Oregon | 5.42 | ▼0.04 |
| 12 | ▼ (1) | California | 5.40 | ▼0.22 |
| 13 | ▲ (3) | Washington | 5.40 | ▼0.01 |
| 14 | ▼ (4) | Rhode Island | 5.38 | ▼0.34 |
| 15 | ▼ (1) | Vermont | 5.31 | ▼0.12 |
| 16 | ▼ (1) | Illinois | 5.31 | ▼0.11 |
| 17 | ▲ (1) | Delaware | 5.22 | Steady |
| 18 | Steady | Missouri | 5.19 | ▲0.06 |
| 19 | ▼ (4) | North Carolina | 5.17 | ▼0.04 |
| 20 | ▼ (1) | District of Columbia | 5.11 | ▼0.06 |
| 21 | ▼ (4) | Alaska | 5.06 | ▼0.29 |
| 22 | Steady | Iowa | 5.03 | Steady |
| 23 | ▲ (7) | Utah | 5.03 | ▲0.17 |
| 24 | ▲ (1) | Kansas | 4.96 | ▲0.03 |
| 25 | ▲ (4) | Maine | 4.93 | ▲0.09 |
| 26 | ▲ (1) | North Dakota | 4.90 | Steady |
| 27 | ▲ (1) | Arizona | 4.89 | ▼0.01 |
| 28 | ▲ (2) | Virginia | 4.87 | ▼0.09 |
| 29 | ▲ (9) | Wyoming | 4.83 | ▲0.30 |
| 30 | ▼ (6) | Florida | 4.82 | ▼0.15 |
| 31 | ▲ (8) | South Dakota | 4.79 | ▲0.26 |
| 32 | ▼ (12) | Michigan | 4.76 | ▼0.37 |
| 33 | ▼ (2) | Ohio | 4.71 | ▼0.09 |
| 34 | ▲ (1) | Texas | 4.65 | ▲0.08 |
| 35 | ▲ (1) | Nevada | 4.63 | ▲0.09 |
| 36 | ▼ (4) | Georgia | 4.62 | ▼0.10 |
| 37 | ▲ (1) | Wisconsin | 4.59 | ▼0.04 |
| 38 | ▲ (4) | Nebraska | 4.58 | ▲0.11 |
| 39 | ▼ (6) | Indiana | 4.56 | ▼0.08 |
| 40 | ▲ (2) | Montana | 4.54 | ▲0.20 |
| 41 | ▼ (1) | New Mexico | 4.52 | ▲0.03 |
| 42 | ▼ (1) | Idaho | 4.50 | ▲0.13 |
| 43 | Steady | South Carolina | 4.35 | ▲0.08 |
| 44 | ▲ (1) | Tennessee | 4.22 | ▲0.11 |
| 45 | ▲ (1) | Oklahoma | 4.14 | ▲0.13 |
| 46 | ▲ (3) | Louisiana | 4.12 | ▲0.27 |
| 47 | Steady | Alabama | 4.04 | ▲0.07 |
| 48 | ▼ (4) | Kentucky | 4.02 | ▼0.10 |
| 49 | ▲ (1) | West Virginia | 3.95 | ▲0.11 |
| 50 | ▼ (2) | Arkansas | 3.91 | ▲0.06 |
| 51 | Steady | Mississippi | 3.81 | ▲0.23 |

== Territories ==
| Territory | HDI | Data Year | Status |
|---|---|---|---|
| Guam | 0.901 | 2008 | Very High human development |
| US Virgin Islands | 0.894 | 2008 | Very High human development |
| Puerto Rico | 0.880 | 2024 | Very High human development |
| Northern Mariana Islands | 0.875 | 2008 | Very High human development |
| American Samoa | 0.827 | 2008 | Very High human development |

== See also ==
- List of U.S. states by Human Development Index
- List of U.S. states by GDP per capita
- List of U.S. congressional districts by life expectancy
- Measure of America
- Thank God for Mississippi
