= Boomerang Generation =

Young adults returning to live with their parents

In Western culture the Boomerang Generation refers to the generation of young adults graduating from high school and college in the 21st century. They are so named for the percentage of whom choose to share a home with their parents after previously living on their own—thus boomeranging back to their parents' residence. This arrangement can take many forms, ranging from situations that mirror the high dependency of pre-adulthood to highly independent, separate-household arrangements.

The term can be used to indicate only those members of this age-set that actually do return home, not the whole generation. In as much as home-leaving practices differ by economic class, the term is most meaningfully applied to members of the middle class.

== Introduction ==
The parental expectation of having an "empty nest", traditional in the United States and some other industrialized cultures, has increasingly given way in the 1990s and 2000s to the reality of a "cluttered nest" or "crowded nest". The latter term was popularized by Kathleen Shaputis's 2004 book The Crowded Nest Syndrome: Surviving the Return of Adult Children, which takes a critical view of the trend.

University of Western Ontario professor Roderic Beaujot discusses the phenomenon of delayed home-leaving at length. He cites Canadian census statistics showing that, in 1981, 27.5% of Canadians aged 20–29 lived with their parents; in 2001, the figure had grown to 41%. In the United States the proportion of adults ages 20 to 34 living with their parents has increased from 9% in 1960 to almost 17% in 2000. However, US Census Bureau data also suggest that the rate at which adult children have been living with parents has been steady since 1981. The U.S. Census Bureau reported a 5 percentage point increase in the number of young men (ages 24–34) living with their parents for the period between 2005 (14%) and 2011 (19%). For the same period, the number of young women living with their parents increased from 8% in 2005 to 10% in 2011.

In Mexico, an estimated 46% of Mexico City residents aged 20 to 30 still lived with their parents, according to the president of the Valley of Mexico chapter of the National Chamber of Housing Development (Canadevi), who attributed this to average monthly wages of around 7,000 pesos for this age group against average rents of approximately 10,000 pesos in the capital. Labor informality compounds this gap, as 59.9% of employed young people in Mexico worked in the informal sector in 2017, according to Mexico's National Council for the Evaluation of Social Development Policy (CONEVAL), which in practice excludes them from the country's main mortgage financing system.

The coming of age of this generation coincided with the economic downturn starting with the collapse of the stock market bubble in 2000. This led to rising unemployment until 2004, the same time this generation was entering the workforce after high school or college graduation. Additionally, in the new economy, where globalisation-induced phenomena like outsourcing have eliminated many jobs, real wages have fallen over the last twenty years, and a college degree no longer ensures job stability. Additionally, during the 2008 financial crisis, many young people were either laid off or could no longer afford to live on their own. Moving back home allows them the option of unpaid internships and additional schooling without the burden of paying rent at market rates (or paying rent at all).

An increase in divorce rates as well as a delay in initial marriage are other contributing factors in young adults returning to reside with their parents.

This generation differs from previous ones in that many members expect to remain with their parents for some years while maintaining their own social and professional lives. Home-leaving remains a priority for most in the Boomerang Generation, though financial burden (and the comforts of financial stability in their parents' homes) often delays the fruition of that goal.

== Trend ==
The phenomenon of boomeranging/delayed home-leaving has generated considerable inquiry and debate, including academic studies at reputable universities; full-length books, such as The Hands-On Guide to Surviving Adult Children Living at Home by Christina Newberry; articles in national newspapers; documentaries, such as Generation Boomerang; and major motion pictures, such as Failure to Launch (2006) starring Matthew McConaughey.

=== Support ===
Economic instability is the primary justification for this phenomenon, as articulated in Kimberly Palmer's 2007 U.S. News & World Report article "The New Parent Trap: More Boomers Help Adult Kids out Financially". In particular, the term Boomeranger has been used to draw reference to those Gen-Xers and Gen-Yers of the Boomerang Generation who have either returned to an earlier, more modest lifestyle or have simply moved back home with parents and other loved ones, in response to the Great Recession. Where the young person and his/her parents can tolerate the arrangement, it provides tremendous financial relief to the young person. Such co-residence can be a valuable form of insurance, particularly for youths from poorer families. It may also provide non-negligible income to the parents, though in many cultures, the boomeranger retains all or nearly all of their disposable income for discretionary income purchases.

Though inter-generational cohabitation is terra incognita for many in modern industrialized Western societies and therefore challenging, those who attempt it can benefit from the experience. The arrangement tends to force all involved to communicate and negotiate in ways they did not when the children were pre-adults. In the best case, this can lead to healthy adult relationships between parents and children.

This can benefit parents when they reach old age. In societies where it is common for children to live with their parents into adulthood, such as Asian and Hispanic cultures, children more frequently take care of aging parents rather than devolving the responsibility on a third party, such as a nursing home. Whether the Boomerang Generation will follow suit remains to be seen, as the older Baby Boomer generation ages. The recession has also affected the Baby Boomers as well, perhaps even more so than their children, as many lost significant investments and savings intended for retirement. In this case, the cohabitation of parents and their adult children could be mutually beneficial in terms of easing the financial burden. While the boomerangers may live rent free, it is common for them to take on other financial responsibilities in return, such as groceries or utilities.

In 2014, 20% of adults in their 20s and early 30s were residing with their parents, which is twice the amount of the previous generation. Though there are many reasons cited for the need for parental support, one of the greatest contributing factors is said to be student loan debt. 45% of 25-year-old college graduates currently owe $20,000 or more. For some families, the financial instability of the mid-2000s caused a decrease in funds allocated for higher education, therefore decreasing parental financial contributions and causing the need for more loans to cover educational costs. And while student loans are more frequently taken out in the student’s name, some parents who took out loans are facing substantial debt and are now relying on their adult children to provide financial assistance while they pay them off.

=== Opposition ===
Critics of the practice of boomeranging worry about the negative effect this trend has on the financial and social independence of the children.

Those who return home from the unrestrictive nature of college dorm life may have difficulty readjusting to their parents' domestic expectations. Where living space is shared, gatherings with friends can be limited in frequency or scope. Dating is similarly constrained and can be impaired by the stigma of the young adult's perceived inability to function independently of their parents.

== See also ==
- Freeters
- Emerging adulthood
- Generation Z
- Kidult
- Millennials
- MTV Generation
- NEET
- Quarter-life crisis
- Sampo generation
- Strawberry generation
- Twixter
- Waithood
