= I'm Livin' It =

2019 Hong Kong film by Danny Wong

- Film poster
- Traditional Chinese: 麥路人
- Simplified Chinese: 麦路人
- Hanyu Pinyin: Mài Lù Rén
- Jyutping: Mak6 Lou6 Jan4
- Directed by: Danny Wong
- Screenplay by: Ja Poon
- Produced by: Cheang Pou-soi
- Starring: Aaron Kwok; Miriam Yeung; Alex Man; Cheung Tat-ming; Paw Hee-ching; Cya Liu; Zeno Koo; Gaga Wong; Kathy Wu; Sammy So; Nora Miao
- Cinematography: Yip Shiu-kei
- Edited by: Siu Pa-wong; Angelina Kwan
- Music by: Peter Kam
- Production companies: Media Asia Films; Entertainment Power; Beijing Lajin Film; Media Asia Distribution (Beijing); China Film Media Asia Audio Video Distribution; Mokexing Film (Beijing); Amazing Global Limited; Mountain Top; EMI Global (Beijing) International Asset Management; Beijing Linxi Film; Beijing Bigmay Universe Film; Star Alliance Pictures (Wuxi)
- Distributed by: Media Asia Distributions; Entertaining Power (Hong Kong, Worldwide); Intercontinental Film Distributors (HK) (Hong Kong)
- Release dates: 29 October 2019 (Tokyo); 17 September 2020 (Hong Kong)
- Running time: 114 minutes
- Country: Hong Kong
- Language: Cantonese
- Box office: US$3.63 million

I'm Livin' It is a 2019 Hong Kong drama film directed by Danny Wong in his directorial debut and starring Aaron Kwok and Miriam Yeung. The film addresses the issues of rich-poor gap in the Hong Kong society, as well as poverty and homelessness and focuses on McRefugees.

I'm Livin' It made its world premiere at the 32nd Tokyo International Film Festival in the Asian Future section on 20 October 2019. The film also closed both the 4th London East Asia Film Festival on 3 November 2019, where Kwok was the subject of the festival's Actor Focus and also winning the Best Actor Award for his performance, and the 4th International Film Festival & Awards Macao on 20 December 2019 before it was theatrically released in Hong Kong on 17 September 2020.

The film was nominated for ten awards at the 39th Hong Kong Film Awards, winning Best Supporting Actor for Cheung Tat-ming.

== Plot ==
Bowen Tung (Aaron Kwok) used to be a financial whiz who has become a McRefugee. He befriends other homeless dwellers, which include Wai-yin (Cya Liu), a mother who becomes indebted from paying off her mother-in-law's debts, Uncle Wait (Alex Man), who is afraid to return home, Sam (Zeno Koo), a teenager who ran away from home, and Jane (Miriam Yeung), a lounge singer. They all support and help each other to overcome the difficult times of their lives.

== Cast ==
- Aaron Kwok as Bowen Tung (董浩博), a financial whiz who was imprisoned for defalcation. After his release from prison, he was ashamed to return home and becomes a McRefugee and befriends fellow homeless dwellers that give each help and support.
- Miriam Yeung as Jane To (杜秋紅), a lounge singer who relocates her career to a Red Envelope Club as she ages and has an intimate relationship with Bowen.
- Alex Man as Lo Chun-keung (盧振強), nicknamed Uncle Wait (等伯), a former fireman whose wife threw herself off a building after she was scammed out of all her life savings. As a result, he develops dementia and is in constant denial of his wife's death, waiting for her return.
- Cheung Tat-ming as Yip Sang-cheung (葉生祥), nicknamed Chatting Cheung (口水祥), a caricature artist whose artworks are exquisite but unable to attract attention. Because he cannot afford food, he later commits theft and was imprisoned as a result.
- Paw Hee-ching as Leung Wan-lan (梁韻蘭), Bowen's mother who had suffered from a stroke and lives in a nursing home. She believes her son is conducting major business in the United States.
- Cya Liu as Leung Wai-yin (梁惠妍), a single mother who dwells with her seven-year-old daughter in McDonald's. After her husband's death, her mother-in-law was addicted to gambling; Wai-yin worked day and night to pay her mother-in-law's debts and raise her daughter.
- Zeno Koo as Sam Wong (王洛深), a teenager who left home after assaulting his pregnant sister-in-law as he was unhappy with being responsible for housework. Bowen later helps him become an apprentice in a hair salon and reunite with his family.
- Gaga Wong as Lee Hiu-wah (李曉華), Wai-yin's seven-year-old daughter who is unable to attend school due to not having a valid ID. She helps her mother in her work.
- Kathy Wu as Tung Kit-yu (董潔如), Bowen's younger sister who studied abroad with her brother's financial support. She was entrusted by her brother to take care of their mother after his release from prison.
- Samson So as Nine Fingers (九指哥), a debt collector who harasses Wai-yin for Lai Fung's debts.
- Nora Miao (special appearance) as Lai Fung (黎鳳), Wai-yin's mother-in-law who becomes a gambling addict after her son's death, accumulating numerous debts. She despises her daughter-in-law, labeling her as a jinx.

== Theme song ==
- Grey Stardust (灰色星塵)
  - Composer: Peter Kam
  - Lyricist: Siu Mei
  - Singer: Aaron Kwok

== Production ==
Aaron Kwok revealed he first read the script for the film at the 2017 Cannes Film Festival and insisted to be part of the project then. He also starved himself to get the feeling of hunger in order to dive deeper into his role. As a result, he suffered from psychosomatic symptoms, thinking he had developed cancer like his character did; Kwok consulted a doctor, who told him not to worry.

== Reception ==
=== Box office ===
I'm Livin' It grossed a total of US$3,629,423 worldwide.

Opening on 17 September 2020 in Hong Kong, the film debuted No. 2 at its opening weekend, grossing HK$2.97 million. During its second weekend, the film grossed HK$2.18 million and was placed at No. 3, grossing a total of HK$5.15 million by then. In its third weekend, the film grossed HK$1.79 million, positioning at No. 4, grossing a total of HK$6.95 million by then. During its fourth weekend, the film grossed HK$700,000, placing at No. 7, having accumulated a total gross of HK$7.59 million by then. By 14 October 2020, I'm Livin' It had grossed a total of HK$8 million in Hong Kong. The film ended its Hong Kong theatrical run with a total gross of HK$8,273,307 at the local box office, making it the fourth highest-grossing domestic film of 2020 in the territory.

=== Critical reception ===
Edmund Lee of the South China Morning Post gave the film a score of 3.5/5 stars praising Danny Wong's direction and the cast's performances. Lim Lian-yu of Yahoo! Lifestyle gave the film a score of 3/5 stars and writes "I’m Livin’ It will make you ponder about the severity of the social issues presented in the movie, and how these issues of being trapped in a vicious poverty cycle have been lingering around and awaiting solutions." The Straits Times praised Wong's direction, calling it an "engaging if heavily romanticised portrait of a tragic social phenomenon." Deborah Young of The Hollywood Reporter praises the film's distinct and convincing tone performances of Aaron Kwok and Miriam Yeung and the film's tech work.

== Awards and nominations ==
Ceremony	Category	Recipient	Results
39th Hong Kong Film Awards	Best Film	I'm Livin' It	Nominated
39th Hong Kong Film Awards	Best Actor	Aaron Kwok	Nominated
39th Hong Kong Film Awards	Best Supporting Actor	Alex Man	Nominated
39th Hong Kong Film Awards	Best Supporting Actor	Cheung Tat-ming	Won
39th Hong Kong Film Awards	Best Supporting Actress	Cya Liu	Nominated
39th Hong Kong Film Awards	Best Art Direction	Man Lim-chung, Billy Li	Nominated
39th Hong Kong Film Awards	Best Costume Make Up Design	Man Lim-chung, Polly Chan	Nominated
39th Hong Kong Film Awards	Best Original Film Score	Peter Kam	Nominated
39th Hong Kong Film Awards	Best Original Film Song	Song: Grey Stardust (灰色星塵) Composer: Peter Kam; Lyricist: Siu Mei; Singer: Aaron Kwok	Nominated
39th Hong Kong Film Awards	Best New Director	Danny Wong	Nominated
3rd Kongest Film Awards	Best Film	I'm Livin' It	Nominated
3rd Kongest Film Awards	Best Actor	Aaron Kwok	Nominated
3rd Kongest Film Awards	Best Actress	Miriam Yeung	Nominated
3rd Kongest Film Awards	My Favorite Hong Kong Film	I'm Livin' It	Nominated

== See also ==
- Aaron Kwok filmography
