= Manga cafe =

Café where people can read manga

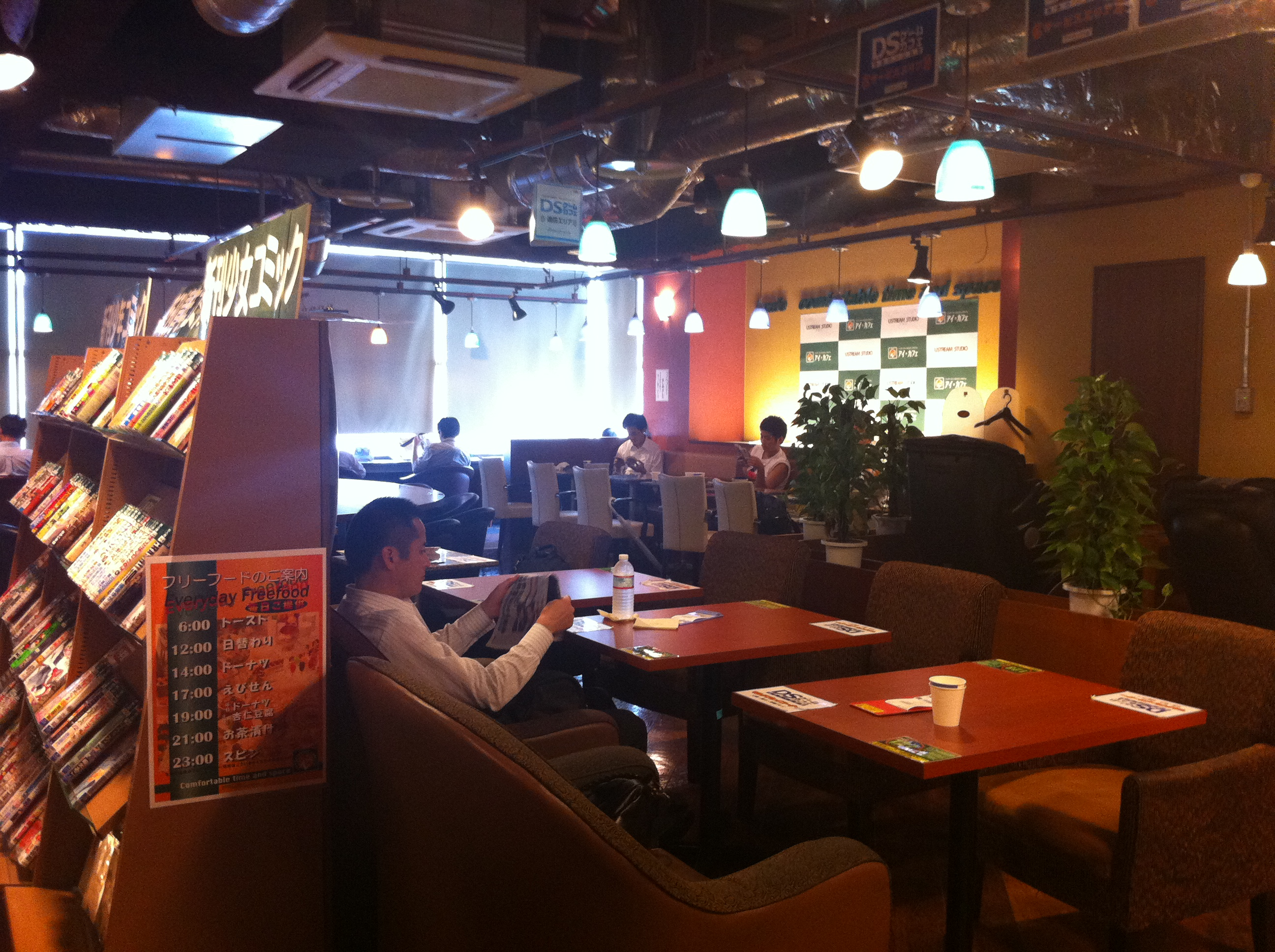
Manga cafe, Chiyoda, Tokyo

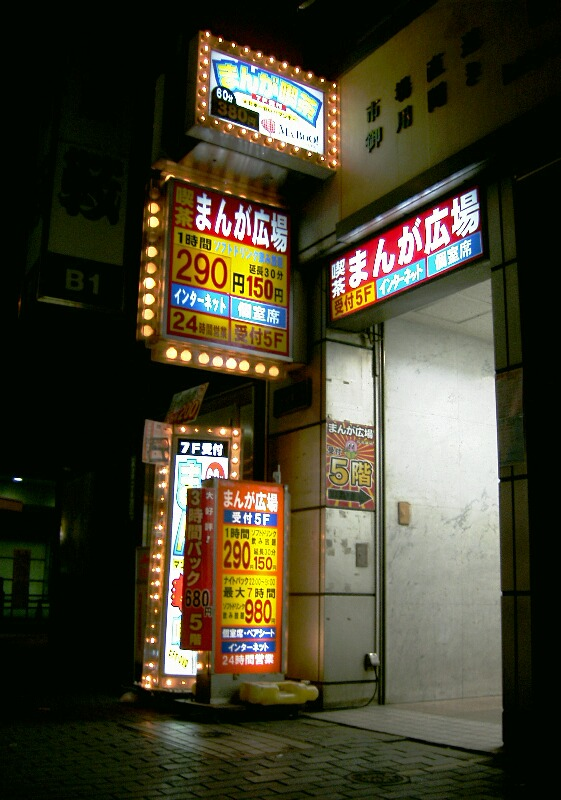
Manga cafe, Tokyo

A manga café (漫画喫茶, マンガ喫茶, mangakissa; "kissa" being short for "kissaten" which means café or cafeteria) is a type of café, originating from Japan, where people can read manga. People pay for the amount of time they stay in the café. Most manga cafés also offer internet access like internet cafés (ネットカフェ, netto kafe) and vice versa, making the two terms mostly interchangeable in Japan. Additional services include video games, television, snacks/beverages, vending machines, and more. Like Japanese cafés in general, smoking is usually permitted.

The cost for the first 30 minutes typically ranges from 100 to 300 yen. Larger blocks of time are usually available at discounted rates. Some manga cafés offer overnight stays.

More recently, the concept of manga cafés has spread to Europe.

== Services ==
Services available at a cafe may include:

- Seating: reading seat, non-smoking seat, sofa, massage chair, party room, internet seat, pair seat, zashiki (tatami matted), reclining seat
- PC: disc burners, office software, color printers, photocopier, TV
- Facilities: movies/DVDs, shower room, darts, magazines, PC class, music CDs, nail salon, pool table, newspapers, CATV/CS broadcast, table tennis, slot machine, tanning bed, mahjong

== Roles of manga cafés ==
1. As a complex cultural space Various changes and improvements helped transform manga cafés into cultural spaces. They became places of relaxation, conversation, and meetings. The business sells coffee, drinks, and other refreshments to act as cafes. Modern facilities and services have also been introduced to improve cleanliness and functionality of interiors.
2. As a channel for the production of comic books Manga cafés were initially started as channels for producing comic books. Originally they were places that provided comics but also served as places to buy or trade this material. For Comic Cakes in South Korea, run by the Haksan Cultural Centre, the cafe is a place to read manga but it also displays and sells over 10,000 paintings and other related products. This is not only to enhance sales, but to also serve as a new distribution and market research channel for publishers.
3. As a space for creating cartoon culture Manga cafés are also used as communication spaces for cartoonists and their readers. Writers sometimes visit manga cafés to communicate directly with readers, and cartoonists promote their own works. Artists' interactions with the community are enhanced, while readers can meet with and talk directly to creators in order to better understand material and increase their interest levels in the material.

== Manga cafés by country ==
=== Japan ===
Manga cafés are also known as Manga kissa (漫画喫茶, マンガ喫茶). Manga cafés are spaces where people can read manga/comics and relax. Manga cafés differ from standard coffee establishments by offering guests private individual booths and the option to stay for between 30 minutes and all night long. The first manga café was established in 1979 in a small coffee shop in Nagoya City.

"Net café refugees" (netto kafe nanmin - people who substitute 'manga cafés' for their domestic residences) is a recent social phenomenon brought about by changing forms of leisure, information technology, social behavior, and the long-term contraction of the Japanese domestic economy. The utility of leisure spaces in Tokyo has shifted along with changes in the work habits and professional expectations of the Japanese poor and lower middle class.

=== South Korea ===
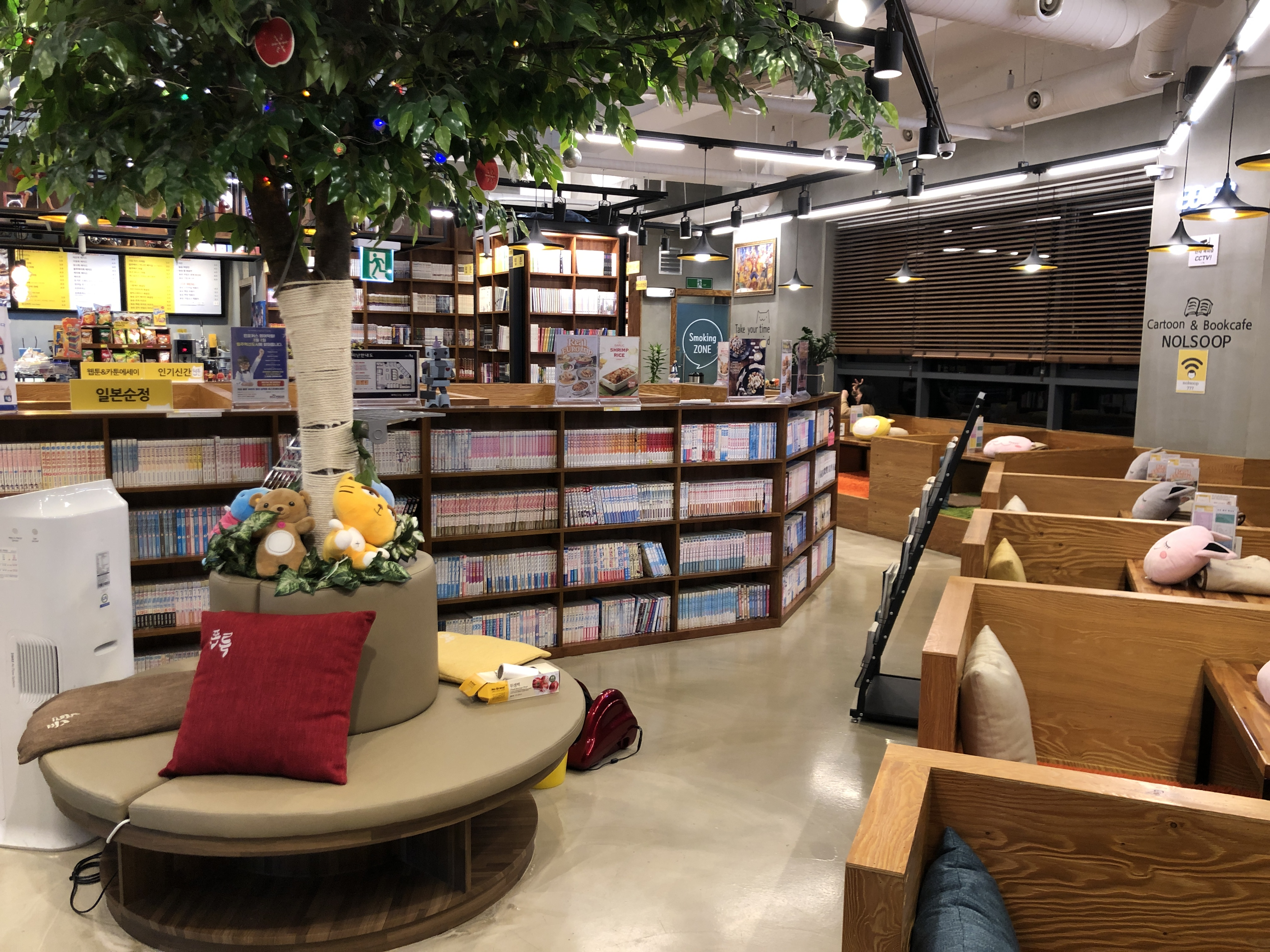
Nolsup in Wonju Innovation City, Gangwon-do

As the number of café chains expands, some are combining traditional cafés with other content services to satisfy consumer demand. For instance, Nolsoop blends cafe offerings with a cartoon room in Korea. Beoltoon and Kongtoon have followed as well. In addition to providing comics and drinks, these shops also offer a variety of food and services. Usage fees and hours are available in 1-hour increments, and if a drink is bought with the hour, the space can be used at a cheaper price.

An increasing number of manga cafes are appearing within movie theaters. Manga cafés are not just places to enjoy comic books and novels. They are increasingly becoming a diverse range of play spaces for eating, board games, and relaxation.

=== Other countries ===
Manga cafés have recently begun to spring up as alternatives to traditional public libraries and other spaces.

In July 2006, the first manga cafe in Europe opened in Paris, France. On October 19, 2008, in Toulouse, a library of manga and cyber cafés based on the Japanese concept opened. Finally, a similar manga and cyber café opened in late 2011 in Lyon Place Vendome.

In 2010, a manga café and shop opened in Belgium in Braine l'Allemagne in the Brabant Wallon called 'Cat's Eye Manga Cafe.' In early 2013 Belgium's largest coffee shop (230 m2) opened in Brussels. This is called Otaka - Manga Café.

In 2011, the first manga café in North America, O-Taku Manga Lounge, opened in Montréal, Canada, reflecting the region's growing interest in manga and Japanese culture.

In 2012, a manga café opened in Finland, the first in Northern Europe. However, as of August 2023, it has been closed.

In 2014, Algeria's first manga cafe, HB Manga Kissa, opened in Algiers. This was the first such establishment in Africa and the Arab world.

== Criticisms ==
Recently, there have been complaints from manga publishing/distribution companies that manga cafés undermine their revenues. Generally, royalties are not paid for reading books and, due to the nature of the business, a single manga or graphic novel can be read by as many as 100 people. Profits go directly to the proprietors of the cafe rather than the manga distributors themselves. Public libraries on the other hand avoid this criticism because they do not make profits.

== See also ==
- Net cafe refugee

== Sources ==
- Macias, Patick and Machiyama, Tomohiro. Cruising the Anime City: An Otaku Guide to Neo-Tokyo, Stone Bridge Press, 2004. ISBN 1-880656-88-4
- Cubicle shelter: Public space for private use?, Visual Ethnography Volume 1, Issue 2, December 2012, Pages 60–80, Kilina, E.
- Manga cafés: A source of competition that has much to teach librarians | [Les «cafés mangas»: Une Concurrence Riche D'Enseignements], Bulletin des Bibliotheques de France, 57(4), pp. 54–58, 2012, Beudon, N.
