= Kissaten =

Japanese-style combination tearoom and coffee shop

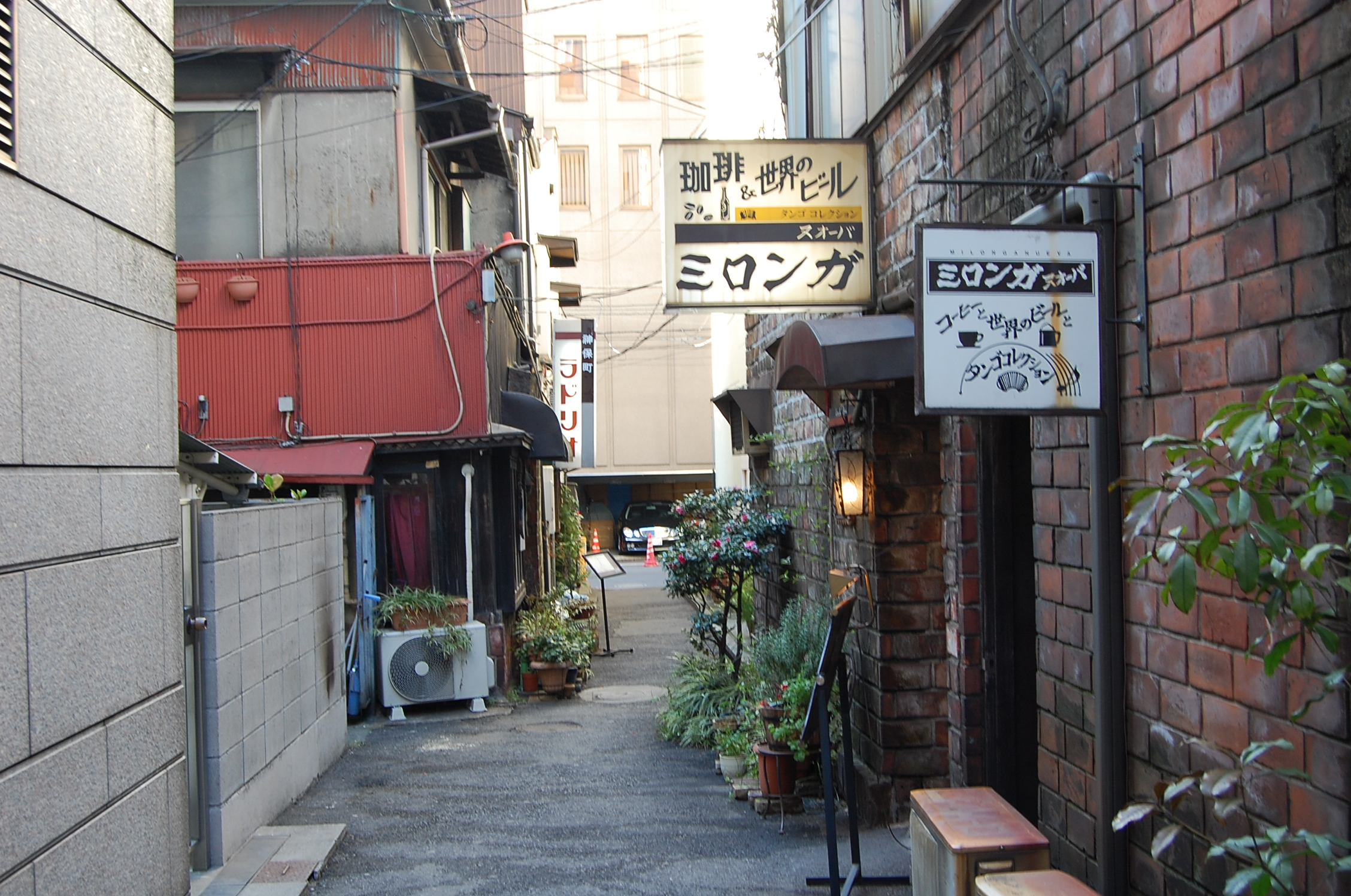
A kissaten in Jinbōchō, Tokyo, Japan

A kissaten (kanji : 喫茶店, hiragana : きっさてん), literally a "tea-drinking shop", is a Japanese-style tearoom that is also a coffee shop. They developed in the early 20th century as a distinction from a café, as cafés had become places also serving alcohol with noise and celebration. The first Japanese café opened in Tokyo in 1888, marking the beginning of coffee culture in the country. However, it wasn't until the 1920s that kissaten truly began to flourish, emerging as quieter, more sophisticated spaces compared to traditional cafés. A kissaten was a quiet place to drink coffee and a gathering place for writers and intellectuals. Kissaten were also influenced by European salons, particularly Parisian and Viennese ones, which combined refinement, a studious atmosphere, and a focus on attentive service. The founders of the first kissaten adapted these models to Japanese sensibilities, favoring discretion, sobriety, and a subdued ambiance.

In urban areas, people frequent kissaten for breakfast where they might have "morning service" of thick toast, boiled or fried eggs, a piece of ham or bacon, and a cup of tea or coffee.

There is also the modern phenomenon of the manga kissa, which is a version of the kissaten with video games, manga and vending machines.

The revived popularity of kissatens in the 2020s is an example of Showa retro.

== See also ==
- Manga cafe
- Cosplay restaurant
- Jazz kissa
