= Waithood =

Stage of life; unemployed college grads

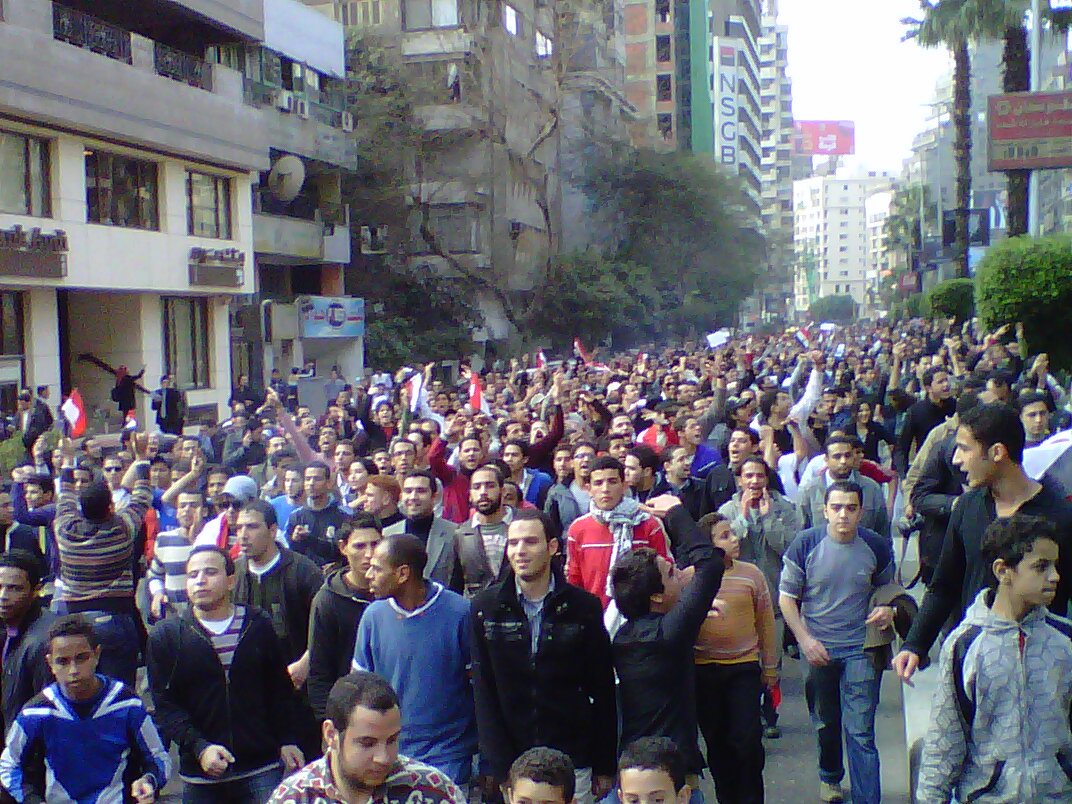
The "Day of Revolt" on 25 January 2011 in Cairo

Waithood (a portmanteau of "wait" and "adulthood") is a period of stagnation in the lives of young unemployed college graduates in various industrializing and developing nations or regions, primarily in the Middle East, North Africa (MENA) and India, where their expertise is still not widely needed or applicable. "Waithood" is described as "a kind of prolonged adolescence", and "the bewildering time in which large proportions of youth spend their best years waiting". It is a phase in which the difficulties youth face in each of these interrelated spheres of life result in a debilitating state of helplessness and dependency. One commentator argues that waithood can be best understood by examining outcomes and linkages across five different sectors: education, employment, housing, credit, and marriage.

The neologism was coined in 2007 by political scientist Diane Singerman.

Waithood is applicable only to college educated people who are not compelled to settle in blue collar jobs due to support from family elders or resources. Due to the lack of any potential employment, waithood is also tangentially related to rising rate of belated parenthood in various developing countries, with younger people choosing or being forced to delay having children, which was uncommon in the modern industrialized countries when they were developing.

== See also ==
- NEET – Demographic category of persons who are not in education, employment, or training
- Freeter – Demographic category in Japan for persons aged 15 to 34 who are not housewives or students and are unemployed or underemployed
- Twixter – Demographic category for young adults who are trapped, in a sense, between adolescence and adulthood.
- Emerging adulthood and early adulthood – Phase of life following adolescence
