= Godzilla head =

Sculpture in Tokyo, Japan

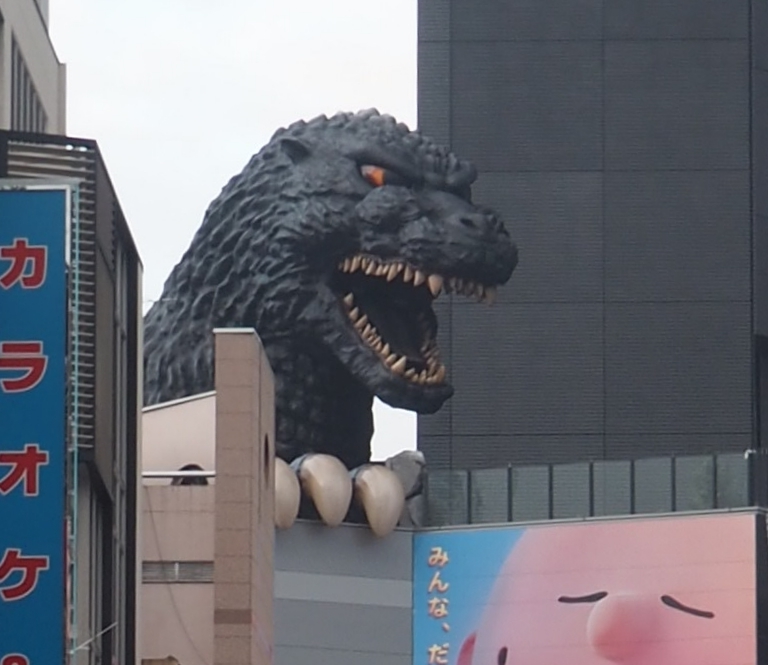
- The Godzilla head on Shinjuku Toho Building, 2015
- Subject: Godzilla
- Location: Kabukichō, Shinjuku, Tokyo, Japan; 35.695034°N 139.701909°E

The Godzilla head is a landmark and tourist attraction in Godzilla Street, Kabukichō, Shinjuku, Tokyo, Japan. The sculpture is accessible from the Hotel Gracery Shinjuku's Godzilla Terrace, on the Shinjuku Toho Building. It depicts Godzilla, occasionally with "glowing eyes and smoky breath". The 80-ton head, based on Godzilla's appearance in Godzilla vs. Mothra (1992), was unveiled in 2015. Its placement on the Hotel Gracery terrace matches Godzilla's 50 meter height seen during the Showa era films in the franchise.

The sculpture was placed as part of the ad campaign for the 2016 film Shin Godzilla. The sculpture was revealed on April 17 2015, where Godzilla was given the title of Shinjuku Tourism Ambassador. Shinjuku Ward mayor Yoshizumi Ken’ichi also gave Godzilla a special ward residency certificate.

The Hotel Gracery offers a Godzilla-themed room that offers views of the landmark. The official Godzilla Store Tokyo opened nearby in October 2017 and is operated by Toho, the owners of the Godzilla franchise.

== Reception ==
Editors of Time Out Tokyo included the Godzilla head in their 2019 list of the city's "best public art sculptures".

== See also ==
- Godzilla in popular culture
- Godzilla Street
