= Karen Robson (sociologist) =

Canadian sociologist and education researcher

Karen Robson (born 1973) is a Full Professor in the Department of Sociology at McMaster University, and the Ontario Research Chair in Educational Achievement and At-Risk Youth. Robson is noted for her work on data infrastructure, the transition from high school to postsecondary education, and statistics.

== Education ==
Robson holds a PhD in applied social and economic research from the University of Essex.

== Work history ==
Robson has worked as a Senior Research Officer at the Institute for Social and Economic Research at the University of Essex. She has worked with UNICEF and the UK Department of Health, examining the correlates of young parenthood the European Union and the differences in the socioeconomic disadvantages of early mothers by ethnic groups in Britain. Robson joined the Department of Sociology at York University in 2004 and has held short post-doctoral positions at the Centre for Research on the Wider Benefits of Learning at the Institute of Education between 2006 and 2007, and The Geary Institute at University College Dublin between 2007 and 2008. She joined McMaster University in 2016 as an Ontario Research Chair.

== Books ==
1. Neuman, Lawrence W. and Robson, Karen (2024) The Basics of Social Research: Qualitative and Quantitative Approaches. Fifth Canadian Edition. Pearson Education.
2. Pevalin, David and Robson, Karen (2009). Stata Survival Manual. Open University Press. (256 pages.) According to WorldCat, the book is held in 708 libraries
3. Robson, Karen and Sanders, Chris (Eds). (2009) Quantifying Theory: Pierre Bourdieu. Springer. (228 pages.)
4. Robson, Karen and Pevalin, David (2016) Multilevel Modeling in Plain Language. Sage. (146 pages.)
