= Disconnected youth =

United States demographic category; NEET

Disconnected youth is a label in United States public policy debate for NEETs; those "Not in Education, Employment, or Training". Measure of America's July 2021 report says disconnected youth (defined as aged 16 to 24) number 4.1 million in the United States, about one in nine of the age cohort. Disconnected youth are sometimes referred to as Opportunity Youth.

Emphasis is placed upon this group because the years between the late teens and the mid-twenties are believed to be a critical period during which young people form adult identities and move toward independence. The effects of youth disconnection—limited education, social exclusion, lack of work experience, and fewer opportunities to develop mentors and valuable work connections—can have long-term consequences that snowball across the life course, eventually influencing everything from earnings and self-sufficiency to physical and mental health and marital prospects. Much discussion has been focused on how to reach these young people and connect them with broader social institutions in order to prevent these negative consequences.

Analysis has also examined the economic impact of youth disconnection. According to the Measure of America report, the average disconnected youth costs $37,450 a year in government services with varying levels of successful impact.

== Definition ==
The term has gained increased usage in recent years among policy advocates and social science researchers, particularly after the Great Recession. After a decade of relatively stable rates, the rolls of the disconnected surged by over 800,000 young people between 2007 and 2010. The latest data indicates that the rate of youth disconnection has fallen to 10.7 percent, a significant drop from the 2010 post-recession high of 14.7 percent, or 5.8 million young people. However, data on disconnected youth during the COVID-19 pandemic in the United States has not yet been reported. It is estimated that at the peak the number was at 9 million.

A 2012 study by the Annie E. Casey Foundation found that "the data show that the populations struggling the most to enter the workforce and stay in school today are youth who are less educated, come from low-income families and belong to a racial or ethnic minority."

The United States Department of Education defines disconnected youth as those aged 14 to 24 years old, but relies on calculations done for the 16-24 group by Measure of America. Some researchers have narrowed the definition of youth disconnection to exclude those above an income and education threshold, and those parenting with a connected spouse.

The two surveys commonly used to calculate youth disconnection are the American Community Survey (ACS) and the Current Population Survey (CPS). Each survey has its advantages; the ACS surveys people in "group quarters" and has a larger sample size, which allows demographic and geographic disaggregation of data, while the CPS is an older survey, including data from 1940 on.

== In 25 largest US metro areas ==
Below is a list of United States metropolitan areas sorted by their rates of disconnected youth in 2019, as well as youth disconnection rates by race and ethnicity in metro areas where the population of that racial or ethnic group is sufficiently large for robust estimates.

Rank	Metro Area	All (percent)	African American (percent)	Latino (percent)	White (percent)
	United States	10.7	16.7	12.1	8.8
1	Boston	6.0	-	10.9	5.2
2	San Francisco	6.4	14.1	6.4	5.0
3	Minneapolis	7.3	-	-	5.3
4	San Diego	7.6	-	7.8	8.5
5	Seattle	8.1	-	-	8.1
6	Philadelphia	8.7	17.7	8.0	5.6
7	Orlando	8.8	11.5	9.5	7.3
8	Washington	8.9	16.3	8.1	5.4
9	Los Angeles	9.2	16.3	10.3	7.2
10	Denver	9.2	-	13.2	6.9
11	Dallas–Fort Worth	9.9	12.7	11.4	7.8
12	Chicago	10.0	20.3	9.8	7.0
13	Portland	10.4	-	12.9	10.9
14	St. Louis	10.8	17.9	-	9.5
15	New York City	11.0	17.4	14.7	7.3
16	Charlotte	11.0	13.5	13.4	8.8
17	Detroit	11.0	20.0	-	7.4
18	Miami	11.2	14.3	10.8	9.7
19	Baltimore	11.3	16.4	-	8.7
20	Atlanta	11.6	15.2	10.7	9.2
21	Phoenix	11.6	-	13.8	9.0
22	Tampa-St. Petersburg	11.9	18.3	11.3	10.7
23	San Antonio	12.0	-	13.0	8.3
24	Houston	12.5	14.6	15.2	7.7
25	Riverside-San Bernardino	13.4	27.3	12.2	13.5
