= Homelessness in Japan =

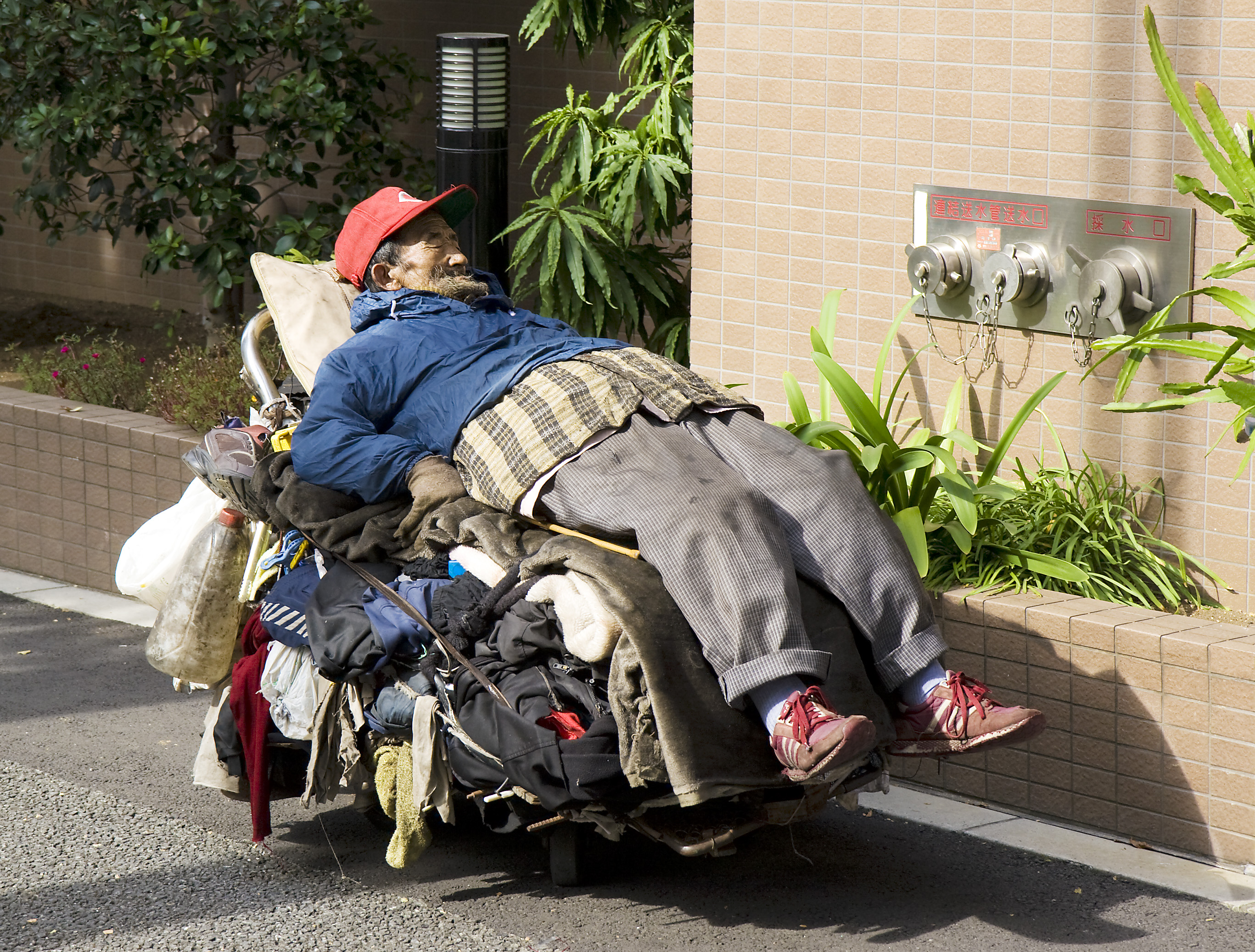
A homeless man sleeping in Tokyo

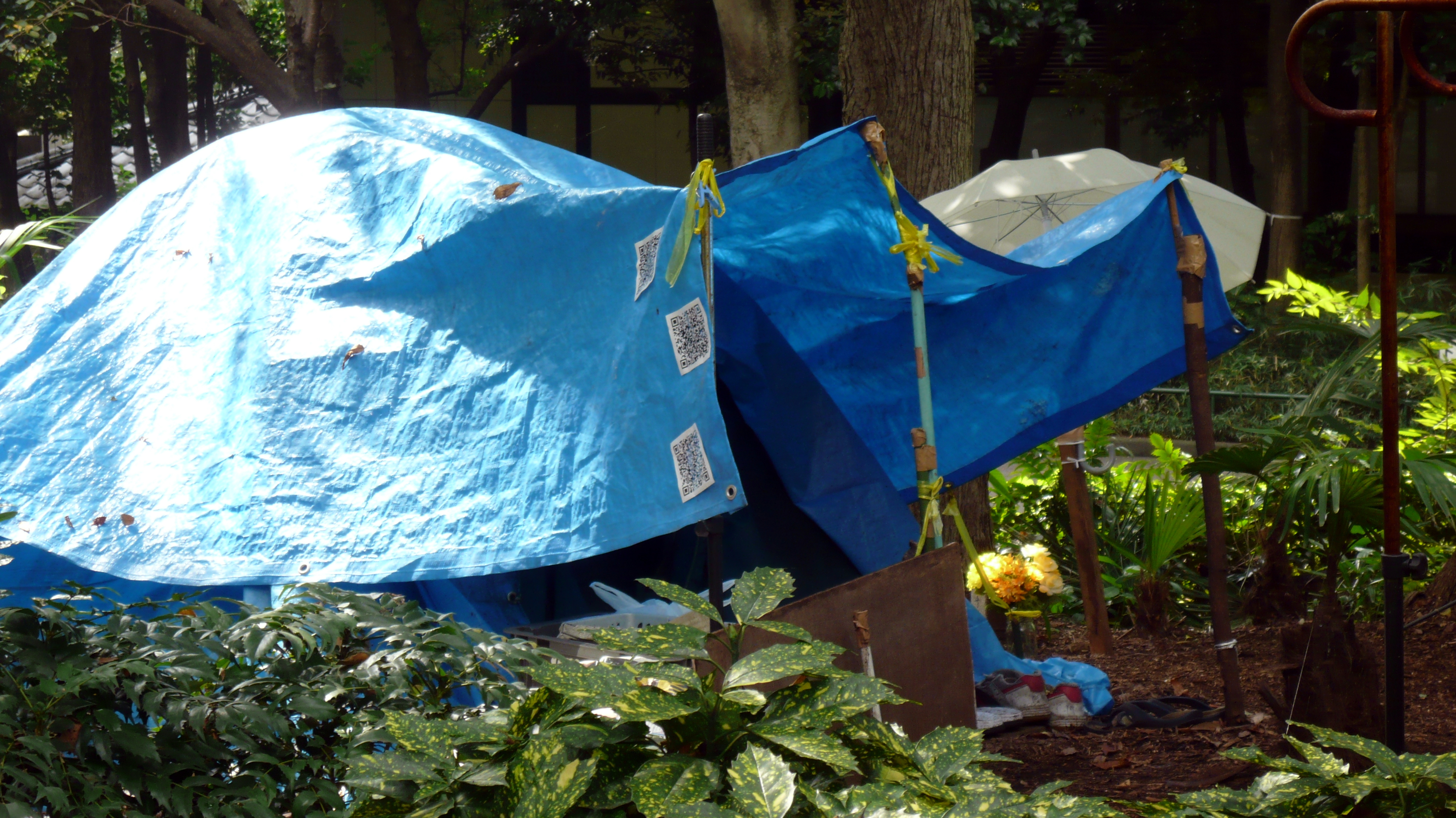
A homeless tent in Shinjuku

Homelessness in Japan (ホームレス, 浮浪者) is a social issue overwhelmingly affecting middle-aged and elderly males. Homelessness is thought to have peaked in the 1990s as a consequence of the collapse of the Japanese asset price bubble and has largely fallen since then. According to a 2022 study by the UK's Greater Change Foundation which measured homelessness globally, Japan has the lowest homelessness rate in the world at 0.003%, which is approximately 1 homeless person out of every 34,000 citizens; however, this number only includes those who are sleeping rough and excludes those who have no fixed abode but sleep in places like net cafes, capsule hotels, or cars.

== Classification ==
=== Definition ===
According to the "Special Act in regards to Supporting the Autonomy of the Homeless Population" (Japanese: ホームレスの自立の支援等に関する特別措置法), the term "homeless" is defined as "those who utilize city parks, river banks, roads, train stations, and other facilities as their place of stay in order to live their daily lives".

=== Names ===
Names for the homeless in Japan include hōmuresu (ホームレス, from the English "homeless"), furōsha (浮浪者, meaning "wandering person"), kojiki (乞食, meaning beggar), and runpen (ルンペン, from German Lumpen). More recently, nojukusha (野宿者, "person who sleeps outside") and nojuku rōdōsha (野宿労働者, "laborer who sleeps outside") have been used to avoid negative connotations associated with the word "homeless".

== History ==
After World War II, many people became homeless due to the economy being damaged from the bombing of the mainland. Fewer people became homeless in the 1960s due to the Japanese economic miracle.

Homelessness grew noticeably more widespread in Japanese society since the collapse of the Japanese asset price bubble across the 1990s, and the resulting Lost Decade of economic stagnation. This has resulted in higher unemployment, a contributing factor towards potential homelessness.

In 1997, Tokyo acknowledged the existence of homeless group representatives and started listening to their issues.

In 1998, officials claimed there were around 3,700 homeless in Tokyo alone. Homeless support groups estimated the number to be close to 5,000 and indicated that this number was rapidly increasing.

Since the 1990s, part-time and temporary employment has increased in Japan, often at the minimum wage, in part due to changes in legislation in 1986 and 1999. Renting accommodation in Japan usually requires a deposit and three months' rent in advance, making access difficult for those without permanent employment. This has increased the homelessness problem.

Due to bureaucratic obstacles, it was quite hard for a homeless person to obtain welfare benefits that they might have been eligible to receive. In August 2002, the "Special Act in regards to Supporting the Autonomy of the Homeless Population" (Japanese: ホームレスの自立の支援等に関する特別措置法) was enacted to reduce obstacles for homeless people to get support.

In 2019, Japan had 22 million part-time and temp workers, compared to 17 million in 2011, according to Japan's Ministry of Internal Affairs and Communications.

== Statistics ==
MHLW Nationwide Homeless Counts
Year	Counted
1999	20,451
2000	-
2001	24,090
2002	-
2003	25,296
2004	-
2005	-
2006	-
2007	18,564
2008	16,018
2009	15,759
2010	13,124
2011	10,890
2012	9,576
2013	8,265
2014	7,508
2015	6,541
2016	6,235
2017	5,534
2018	4,977
2019	4,555
2020	3,992
2021	3,824

According to a survey conducted by the Ministry of Health, Labour and Welfare between January and February 2003, the total number of homeless people in Japan at that time was 25,296. However, according to another survey conducted by the Ministry, by January 2007 the number had fallen to 18,564 due to economic recovery across Japan. At that time middle-aged and elderly men accounted for 95% of the homeless population, with the average age being 57.5 years old.

In 2001, the government reported there were approximately 25,000 homeless people in Japan. At its peak in 2003, 25,269 homeless people were counted throughout Japan by the Ministry of Health, Labour and Welfare. In 2018, the number of homeless people counted in Japan was 4,977 (4,607 males, 177 females and 193 unknown). In 2020, the number of homeless counted was 3,992 (3,688 males, 168 females and 136 people of obscurity), a 12.4% decrease from 2019. The largest number of homeless was found in Osaka metropolitan area (1,038 people), followed by Tokyo metropolitan area (889 people) and Kanagawa prefecture (719 people).

For the first time between June and July 2007 a survey was done by the Ministry of Health, Labour and Welfare in regards to people spending the night at Internet cafés and 24-hour shops. The study found that across Japan, the number of people either sleeping or staying up all night in these places was around 5,400. The survey found that the number of homeless people in the eastern part of Japan, where the winter is comparatively colder, was 9,225; while the number of homeless people in the western part of Japan (described in the study as areas west of Toyama, Gifu, and Aichi prefectures), where the winter is comparatively warmer, was 9,339. Since the numbers were approximately the same, it was concluded that there was not a strong correlation between climate conditions and distribution of homelessness across the country. When divided by administrative divisions the highest number of homeless people was in Tokyo metropolitan area, at 2,672. Second-highest was Osaka metropolitan area at 2,500, and third-highest was Kanagawa prefecture at 1,814 people. When divided by municipal districts, the highest number of homeless people was in the 23 districts of Tokyo, at 2,396. Second-highest was Osaka city at 2,171 people, and third-highest was Yokohama city at 692 people.

== Support ==
In August 2002, the "Special Act in regards to Supporting the Autonomy of the Homeless Population" (Japanese: ホームレスの自立の支援等に関する特別措置法) was enacted, and proper support began to be offered by the country, including the first nationwide survey into the homelessness of the country, launched by the Ministry of Health, Labour and Welfare in February 2003. A factual investigation was also conducted in April 2007.

- People without the income, savings or property to meet the basic necessities of living were able to receive livelihood protection.
- Women escaping from domestic violence, or from former partners seeking to restart former relationships, were able to receive support from women's care institutions, refuges, and shelters.
- In the case of minors, forms of support such as child welfare institutions were also made available.

== Specific aspects ==
Some specific aspects of Japanese homelessness are due to the social structure of Japanese society. Historically, men were the sole providers for their families. Japanese companies believe that married men work better than unmarried ones do because the former feel more obligations and responsibilities toward their families. Hence, not only elderly men, who face ageism and cannot find employment, but unmarried men over 35 years old have difficulties in finding employment. Furthermore, families usually provide more support for women than they do for men.

== Internet cafés and homeless ==
As of 2011, Japan is continuing to experience economic recession. For ¥1,500 to ¥2,000 per night, homeless people have been staying in Internet cafés or capsule hotels, where they get an individual room (space) and a shower, television, soft drinks and Internet access.

== See also ==
- Kamagasaki
- Toyoko kids
- Poverty in Japan
- Deinstitutionalisation
- Tokyo Godfathers - an animated film about three homeless people in Tokyo
- 2011 Tōhoku earthquake and tsunami
- Economy of Japan
