= NEET =

Person who is not in education, employment, or training

Youth not in education, employment or training

A NEET (/niːt/ "neat"), an acronym for "Not in Education, Employment, or Training", is a person who is unemployed and not receiving an education or vocational training. The classification originated in the United Kingdom in the late 1990s, and its use has spread, in varying degrees, to other countries, including Canada, China, Japan, Serbia, South Korea and the United States. The NEET category includes the unemployed (individuals without a job and seeking one), as well as individuals outside the labour force (without a job and not seeking one). It is usually age-bounded to exclude people in old-age retirement. NEET frequently refers to youth or young adults, where NEET is distinct from youth unemployment. Generations with high NEET have been described as lost generations.

In the United Kingdom, the classification comprises people aged between 16 and 24. In Japan, the classification comprises people aged between 15 and 34 who are not employed, not engaged in housework, not enrolled in school or work-related training, and not seeking work.

A 2008 report by the Organisation for Economic Co-operation and Development (OECD) said the unemployment and NEET rates for people aged 16–24 in the majority of OECD countries fell in the past decade, attributed to increased participation in education.

NEET is to be distinguished from the newly coined NLFET rate ("Neither in the Labour Force nor in Education or Training") used in the 2013 report on Global Employment Trends for Youth by the International Labour Organization. NLFET is similar to NEET but excludes unemployed youth (who are part of the work force).

== United Kingdom ==
Knowledge of the term spread after it was used in a 1999 report by the Social Exclusion Unit (SEU). Before this, the phrase "status zero", which had a similar meaning, was used. Andy Furlong writes that the use of the term NEET became popular partly because of the negative connotations of having "no status". The classification is specifically redefined in other local government papers, such as "respondents who were out of work or looking for a job, looking after children or family members, on unpaid holiday or traveling, sick or disabled, doing voluntary work or engaged in another unspecified activity"; the acronym, however, has no agreed definition with respect to measurement, particularly in relation to defining economic inactivity. Karen Robson writes that the classification has "virtually usurped discussions of "youth unemployment" in the UK literature". Scott Yates and Malcolm Payne say that initially there was a "holistic focus" on the NEET group by policy-makers which looked at the problems young people went through, but this changed as the NEET status became framed in negative terms—"as reflective of a raft of risks, problems and negative orientations on the part of young people". NEET figures for England are published by the Department for Education (DfE). The methodology used in calculating the number of NEETs aged 16–18 is different from that used for those aged 16–24. The first relies on a range of sources, the second on the Labour Force Survey.

A 2007 report commissioned by the Prince's Trust said almost a fifth of people aged 16–24 in England, Scotland, and Wales were NEETs; the proportion was lowest in Northern Ireland (13.8 percent). The second-quarter figures for 2011 showed that 979,000 people in England between 16 and 24 were NEETs, accounting for 16.2 percent in that age group. Between 1995 and 2008, the proportion of NEETs aged 16–18 in England remained fairly stable at around 8–11 percent. The Guardian reported in 2011 that, since 2003, there has been a 15.6 percent decrease in people aged 16–18 in employment, but a 6.8 percent increase in those in education and training. NEET figures tend to peak in the third quarter, when school and university courses are ending.

There is some stigma attached to the term NEET. Simon Cox of BBC News said the word is "the latest buzzword for teenage drop-outs". He says "Neets are 20 times more likely to commit a crime and 22 times more likely to be a teenage mum", and that Barking and Dagenham has been called the country's "Neet capital". David Smith of The Times calls them "the yobs hanging around off-licences late into the night". According to Colin Webster, NEETs commit disproportionately large amounts of crime. Children with high levels of truancy and exclusions at school are likely to become NEETs.

Several schemes and ideas have been developed to reduce the number of NEETs. One of the main goals of the Connexions service, first piloted in 2001, is to reduce the number of NEETs. Most local authorities have made a local area agreement to this end. As part of the 2004 Spending Review, the Department for Education and Skills (DfES) had a public service agreement to reduce the proportion of NEETs from 9.6 percent in 2004 to 7.6 percent in 2010. Introduced in 2004–2005 the UK-wide Education Maintenance Allowance offers a means-tested weekly payment of up to £30 to young people continuing education past secondary school. In 2007 the government implemented a "September guarantee" that guaranteed all 16-year-old school leavers a suitable learning place in September, extended to 17-year-olds the following year. The "Young Person's Guarantee" was announced in the 2009 budget, offering a guaranteed job, training, or work experience to 18- to 24-year-olds who have been on Jobseeker's Allowance for six months; it went live on 25 January 2010. It was announced in the 2010 budget that the scheme would end in March 2012, an extension of one year.

In England, the Education and Skills Act 2008, introduced requirements for those above school-leaving age in England (16) to either be in full-time (or part-time) work, or another form of post-16 education, such as college or university. These requirements are exclusive to England and do not apply anywhere else in the United Kingdom.

A number of further education colleges seek to enrol NEETs. For example, it was reported in 2005 that a course for NEETs at Bournemouth and Poole College had offered various sign-on incentives, and completion bonuses of a free iPod and £100 in cash.

The Scottish Government limits the NEET classification to those aged 16–19.

== Japan ==
NEET is a distinct social policy category from that of freeter, the classification for those working low-wage part-time jobs, although in practice thousands of young people move between these categories (i.e., from the status of non-employed young person to that of a part-time worker and back) each year.

The demographic prevalence of NEETs has been indicated in employment statistics. Japanese politicians expressed concern about the impact on the economy of the growth in the NEET population. The estimated size rose from 480,000 in September 2002 to 520,000 in September 2003, according to the Japanese Ministry of Health, Labor and Welfare. Other surveys by the Japanese government in 2002 presented a much larger figure of 850,000 people who can be classified as NEET, of which 60% were people aged 25 to 34. It is therefore clear that the statistical number of NEETs depends greatly on the specific definition adopted, so all figures should be treated with caution.

When the NEET issue erupted in the Japanese media in 2004 and 2005, non-employed young people falling into this category were framed as lazy, work-shy, and voluntarily out of employment. This media portrayal was effective in arousing the concern of Japan's (conservative) middle aged population, but it led only to moderate support for new youth policies. Indeed, as argued by Toivonen in an empirical monograph that juxtaposes media and policy discourses with youth support practices, the most promising solutions to the NEET conundrum have been created by social entrepreneurs such as Kudo Kei and Iwamoto Mami rather than by MHLW policymakers or even scholars.

Compared to most Western European countries, Japan's unemployment benefit is relatively short-lived and terminates automatically after three to six months and there is a limited range of support for those with special needs. Many NEETs in Japan are thus inevitably supported by their parents or relatives, though some find their way to Youth Support Stations and other services designed and/or enacted by social enterprises, including many NPOs.

== Australia ==
A 2016 report by the Organization for Economic Co-operation and Development (OECD) revealed that 580,000 young Australians (aged 15–29), or 11.8%, fall under the classification (for 2015). The report also revealed that the number of NEETs has soared by 10,000 since the 2008 financial crisis and in 2016 accounted for one in eight Australians between the ages of 15 and 29.

== Canada ==
Statistics Canada carried out the first comprehensive study into the state of NEETs in Canada in 2012. It was revealed that around 13% of Canadians between the ages of 15 and 29 fell into the category, a total of 904,000, the second lowest in the G7 nations. Out of the total 904,000 NEETs, around 513,000 were not looking actively for jobs. The study suggested that long-term unemployment was not necessarily due to wider disenchantment with the labour market but rather arose out of varying factors, and that 82% of the young people not in the labour force actually want to be placed in long-term employment. The study classified the Canadian NEET population not to be "in a high risk, negative state".

According to a Labour Force Survey by Statistics Canada, the proportion of NEETs in Canada rose to 24% in 2020, coinciding with the start of the COVID-19 pandemic.

== Iberia and Latin America ==
In Spain, Mexico, Argentina, Chile, Peru and Uruguay, the term ni-ni ('neither-nor') has become a popular equivalent of NEET. The term means ni estudia, ni trabaja ('neither studies, nor works'). In Portuguese there is the equivalent term nem-nem.

The term has become a controversial topic in Mexico, where the government feels that people who might be considered NEET are more likely to choose to join the organizations involved in drug trafficking in order to sustain their economical and personal needs, than they are to get a job or study. Some states and organizations in Mexico are creating work programs and scholarships to keep the NEET population away from drug cartels.

In Latin America and the Caribbean, the World Bank estimates one in five people ages 15–24 are ninis, 20 million in total, an increase of 2 million since 1992. The 2016 study notes that two thirds of nini are women, mostly due to early marriage, teenage pregnancies, or both. It is noted that the number of male ninis increased by 46% since 1992; males account for the entire increase of ninis in the region. Male ninis usually drop out of school to work low-paying jobs, and during periods of economic instability lose their jobs with little chance of returning to school.

In Mexico, ninis statistically account for at least a quarter of increased homicides in high-crime areas during 2007–2012, but in lower-crime areas there is no association between ninis and crime. The World Bank noted that as of 2010 in Latin America and the Caribbean, the number of ninis is somewhat lower than the global average though much higher than in higher-income nations. Globally, of the 260 million ninis counted in 2010 by the World Bank, the Middle East, North African and South Asian regions had the highest shares.

== United States ==
Given the lasting effects caused by the Great Recession, publications such as Time have published articles discussing the number of Americans that have qualified as NEETs, with approximately 15% of Americans under the age of 25 qualifying as such during the first quarter of 2011. Journalist Peter Gumbel wrote in late 2012 that NEETs are "especially prevalent in the U.S." and constitute a "marginalized group of young people" given U.S. state and local government difficulties in maintaining social services.

== European Union ==
In 1995, the Leonardo da Vinci programme supported transnational mobility, skills and employability. The programme was renewed until 2013.

In 2021, the European Commission launched the ALMA ("Aim, Learn, Master, Achieve") social inclusion initiative to facilitate the move from NEET status to education and employment. ALMA provides bespoke training for adults under 30 in their own country, and opportunities for training and mentoring in another EU country, for 2 to 6 months. It is operated along with the EURES network, and with the cooperation of businesses, youth organisations and training centres. The scheme began as a German government initiative called Integration durch Ausbildung (IdA) in 2008.

== NEET rates in OECD countries ==
Share of youth not in education, employment or training, total (% of youth population)
| Country/territory | Share (%) | Year |
|---|---|---|
| Turkey | 28.3 | 2020 |
| Colombia | 27.3 | 2021 |
| Costa Rica | 20.9 | 2023 |
| Mexico | 18.3 | 2019 |
| Italy | 19.8 | 2021 |
| Chile | 16.5 | 2019 |
| Israel | 16.8 | 2021 |
| Lithuania | 14.9 | 2024 |
| United States | 13.1 | 2019 |
| Austria | 13.3 | 2024 |
| Greece | 12.5 | 2023 |
| Canada | 13.0 | 2024 |
| Spain | 12.1 | 2019 |
| France | 11.8 | 2023 |
| New Zealand | 12.8 | 2024 |
| Hungary | 11.0 | 2019 |
| United Kingdom | 14.3 | 2024 |
| Slovakia | 10.3 | 2019 |
| Poland | 10.2 | 2023 |
| Ireland | 10.1 | 2019 |
| Estonia | 9.6 | 2023 |
| Belgium | 9.3 | 2019 |
| Australia | 8.9 | 2017 |
| Luxembourg | 8.8 | 2023 |
| Finland | 8.3 | 2024 |
| Portugal | 8.0 | 2019 |
| Latvia | 9.9 | 2024 |
| Denmark | 7.7 | 2019 |
| Germany | 7.6 | 2024 |
| Slovenia | 7.3 | 2023 |
| Czech Republic | 7.0 | 2023 |
| Switzerland | 6.6 | 2023 |
| Sweden | 5.6 | 2024 |
| Norway | 5.4 | 2023 |
| Iceland | 4.7 | 2019 |
| Netherlands | 4.3 | 2019 |
| Japan | 3.1 | 2019 |
| South Korea | 10.8 | 2002 |

While quantitative data places Turkey among the countries with the highest NEET rates in the OECD, qualitative research highlights the specific social dynamics of this issue. A 2025 study analyzing digital discussions on YouTube identified that the discourse towards NEETs in Turkey is predominantly driven by criticisms of the political system and societal norms, particularly family pressure, rather than individual shortcomings. The study also noted significant gendered dimensions: female NEETs frequently cited unpaid domestic labor and pressure to marry as challenges, while discussions regarding male NEETs often centered on societal expectations of financial provision and toxic masculinity.

== See also ==
- Compulsory education – Period of education required for a person
- Disconnected youth – United States demographic category; NEET
- Discouraged worker – Person of legal employment age who is not actively seeking employment
- Emerging adulthood and early adulthood – Phase of life following adolescence
- Ergophobia – Fear of work
- Failure to launch – Concept related to young emerging adults
- Frisch elasticity of labor supply – Responsiveness of hours worked to the wage rate
- Hikikomori – Reclusive adolescents or adults
- Hong Kong Kids phenomenon – Referring to children who are regarded as spoilt and overly dependent
- Job guarantee – Economic policy proposal for full employment
- Jobpocalypse – Unemployment caused by technological change
- N-po generation – South Korean neologism
- Refusal of work – Behavior in which a person refuses regular employment
- Satori generation – Japanese neologism
- Simultaneous recruiting of new graduates – Japanese hiring practice
- Slacker – Person who habitually avoids work or lacks work ethic
- Tang ping – Chinese neologism, "lying flat"
- Technological unemployment – Unemployment caused by technological change
- Waithood – Stage of life; unemployed college grads
- Young night drifters – Adolescents loitering at night in Hong Kong
- Youth unemployment – Situation of young people who are willing to work but unable to find a job

== Sources ==
- "Literature Review of the NEET Group" (PDF). Archived (PDF) from the original on 12 October 2012. (622 KB). Scottish Executive. 2005. Accessed 25 August 2011. 25 August 2011. See HTML version.
- "Young people not in education, employment or training" (PDF). Archived from the original (PDF) on 29 August 2011. (237 KB). Northern Ireland Assembly. 10 November 2009. Accessed 26 August 2011.
- Children, Schools and Families Committee. "Young people not in education, employment or training (Vol 1)" (PDF). Archived (PDF) from the original on 24 July 2017. (1.2 MB). The Stationery Office. 8 April 2010. Accessed 25 August 2011. 25 August 2011.
