= Moonlight clan =

People who expend their entire salary before the end of each month

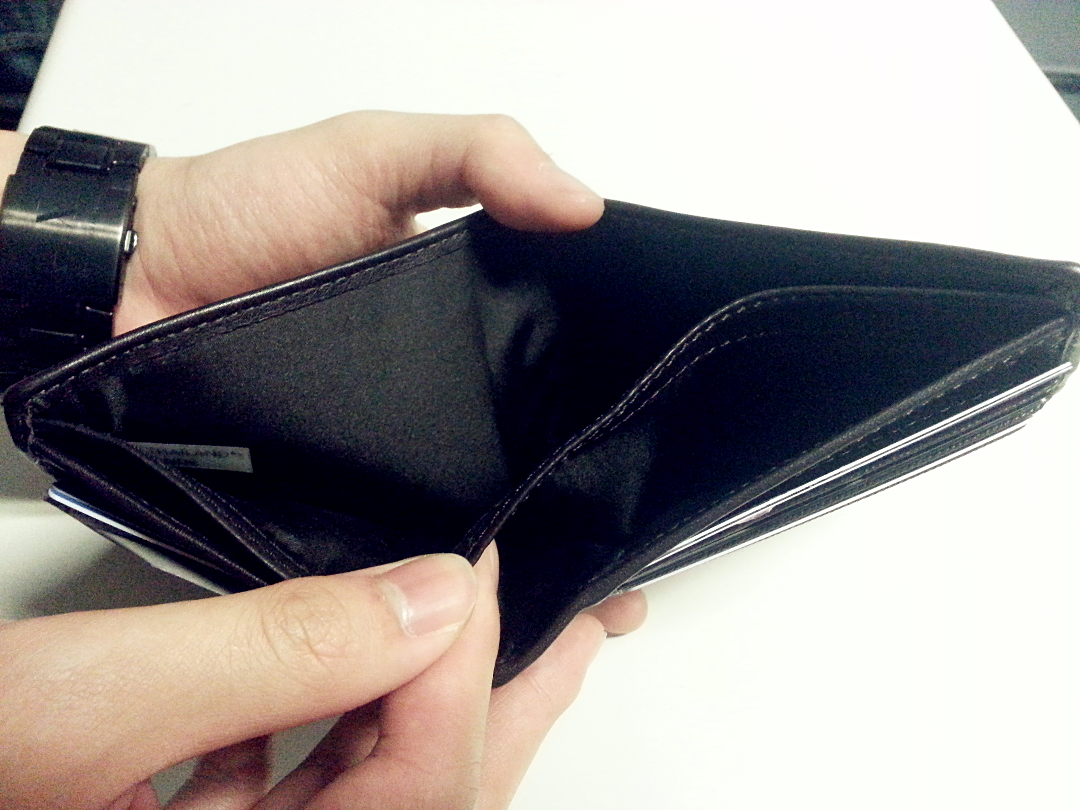

In Mainland China, Hong Kong, and Taiwan, the moonlight clan (Chinese: 月光族; pinyin: Yuèguāng Zú) is a name given to people (particularly young people) who expend their entire salary before the end of each month. The term is derived from a lunar cycle. While yue guang translates directly to "moonlight", it is also a pun derived from the combination of its individual words, yue (月; month or moon) and guang (光; 'empty, used up, or light'). In the United States, a comparable notion is referred to as "living paycheck to paycheck".

"Moonlight clan" is a relatively new Chinese neologism. It generally refers to wealthier individuals who could be saving but choose not to, rather than those with a low income.

Causes of the increase in this population include low income and a relatively high cost of living. The median monthly income of Hong Kongers aged 15–24 remained unchanged at HKD $8,000 between 2001 and 2011, though the median monthly income of the whole population had increased to HKD$9,000. The Consumer Price Index of Hong Kong increased by thirteen percent, from 96 to 109 index points, in that same period. It also relates to a broader shift towards a consumer culture in China, such as an increase in the use of credit cards.

== Population ==
=== Mainland China ===
A survey in 2011 on Guangzhou youth aged 15–35 revealed that 35 percent of interviewees were part of the moonlight clan.

In the middle of 2019, the People's Bank of China released the "2019 Consumer Financial Literacy Survey Report" which is a comprehensive analysis of the financial literacy of Chinese consumers from perspectives of attitude, behavior, knowledge and skill. Among the 18,600 samples surveyed, most consumers paid more attention to personal credit score. The willingness to delay consumption declined slightly. 79.03% of consumers disapproved of being in the moonlight clan, and only 17.8% said they "strongly agreed" or "somewhat agreed" with it.

=== Hong Kong ===
In 2012, MassMutual Asia Ltd commissioned the Public Opinion Programme of the University of Hong Kong to conduct a telephone survey about post-80s and post-90s. The survey findings revealed that one out of seven respondents spent as much or more as they earned monthly.

In 2017, one in every six people in Hong Kong, aged 18 to 35, had no money left over to save each month, an increase from 2013 when one in every seven people didn't save.

== See also ==
- Working poor
