= Post-90s =

Chinese demographic cohort born in the 1990s

The Post-90 generation (Note: simplified Chinese: 九零后; traditional Chinese: 九零後; pinyin: Jiǔ líng hòu; Yue Chinese: 九十後, romanized: gau2 sap6 hau6 or Yue Chinese: 九零後, romanized: gau2 ling4 hau6) is a generation in China, especially in urban areas, generally considered to be born between 1990 and 1999 though sometimes considered to start with those born in the fall of 1989 (as they would graduate in the same class as those born in 1990). It is the Chinese counterpart to late Millennials and early Generation Z in the Western world. They are also China's last 20th-century-born cohort.

They are alleged to have traits that are similar to the Post-80s generation, such as the Little Emperor Syndrome and a knack for information technology and capitalism, but in a much more highly developed way. On the other hand, the post-1990 generation is also characterized as being more realistic about their place in society than the post-1980 generation.

The Post-90 generation is also alleged to have less of a sense of hierarchy in the workplace and more of a sense of individuality compared to older generations.

The Post-90 generation have distinct cultural characteristics and are often stereotyped as "lazy, promiscuous, confused, selfish, brain-damaged and overall hopeless".

Unlike the Post-80 generation, which witnessed a glimpse of pre-affluent China in the late 1980s and 1990s, all but the oldest members of the Post-90 generation have only known a booming urban China for most of their lives.

== See also ==
- Millennials
- Generation Z
- Internet in China
- Moonlight clan
- One child policy
- Strawberry generation, the equivalent generation in Taiwan (born 1981–1991)
- 9X Generation, equivalent demographic cohort from Vietnam
