= Post-80s =

Chinese demographic cohort born in the 1980s

The Post-'80s (Note: simplified Chinese: 八零后; traditional Chinese: 八零後; pinyin: Bā líng hòu; Jyutping: baat3 ling4 hau6 or Yue Chinese: 八十後, romanized: baat3 sap6 hau6) or Post-1980s is a Chinese colloquial term referring to the generation in Mainland China born between 1980 and 1989, especially in urban cities, after the introduction of the one-child policy. It is the Chinese counterpart to older Millennials in the Western World, the first post-Cultural Revolution generation, and the first to grow up entirely within the reform and opening up era. The Post-80s currently ranges from age 36 to 46, making up a major portion of China's working young adult demographic.

== Etymology ==
In English, this group is also sometimes called China's Generation Y after the use of the term in the book China’s Generation Y by Michael Stanat in 2005.

== Characteristics ==
The Post-80s is a generation of approximately 240 million people born between 1980 and 1989. Growing up in modern China, this generation has been characterized by its optimism for the future, newfound excitement for consumerism, entrepreneurship, and acceptance of its historic role in transforming modern China into an economic superpower.

These people are also distinguished by their increased access to digital media such as computers, MP3 players and mobile phones. Post-'80ers in China often experience a palpable generation gap between them and their elders; while their parents lived during the Mao Zedong era, experienced famine and political instability and lack proper education because of the policies set forth under the Cultural Revolution, they live in an environment of tremendous economic growth and social change, high technology, and rigorous education standards. There is also a significant generation gap between them and Post-'90, who are even more thoroughly entrenched in digitality and capitalism.

A clash between tradition and modern influences is noticeable in purchasing habits, career pursuits, and daily interaction between child and elders. Furthermore, young adults have been indirectly affected by forced government shutdowns of thousands of Internet bars each year that prevent the excessive use of the Internet. Young people are also affected by China's large socioeconomic divide between urban and rural residents and societal problems resulting from modernization.

== Future ==
The Post-'80 generation illuminates important questions not only about China's future but also those of the United States and the global economy. Several factors that may influence the generation are individualism, consumerism, modernization, and technology.

== "Little emperors" ==
When parents over-indulge their only child, who has no siblings as a result of the One Child Policy, the indulged children may be referred to as "little emperors" (小皇帝; xiǎohuángdì). Many Chinese families have the 4-2-1 format: 4 grandparents, 2 parents, one child. Parents and grandparents eat less and spend less money on themselves, only so the youngster could feel physically and mentally strong, focus on one's studies and be successful later on in life.

Almost all Chinese families usually adopt a set of traditional Confucian values when raising their only child. Because Confucianism considers Ren (仁; love and social responsibility) the core emotion that develops moral conceptions into genuine personal motivation, a child who has received too much familial attention but also endured high mental and physical restrictions because the economic future of the family depends on their academic success directly leads to a situation that is often considered in academic and popular discourse as over-indulging the children, in opposition to concepts of Ren and filial piety (孝; xiao). There is substantial evidence that many young Chinese feel a heavy burden and a huge responsibility towards their parents, understanding that their performances in school or other domains can be of crucial consequences towards their family.

Depending on the specific family conditions and children's mental health condition, this burden could lead to a diligent lifestyle by youngsters or to a more rebellious attitude to traditional Confucian codes or not being able to cope with such pressure nor develop self-discipline.

While being nurtured by parents and relatives gives children some clear advantages and opportunities, the fact that a child does not have siblings who 'compete' with him or her at a younger age could also lead to some psychological difficulties as the child grows. "Lacking adapting capabilities" (Chinese: 没有适应能力; pinyin: méiyǒu shìyìng nénglì) is a description which is commonly associated with the new post-'80 generation. Since such children do not need to put in any efforts in order to gain their parents' attention or to win family resources, they develop no competitive abilities and have weak social skills once they are older and need to be self-sufficient.

Traditionally seen as a rite of passage, marriage has been linked as milestones to adulthood. Yet, the Chinese millennials are late bloomers when it comes to marriage. Although some members of the millennials are well in their 30s, statistics show they are still living their lives as bachelors or bachelorettes.

Having grown up in times of modern consumerism and popular media, rather than the ideals of the Cultural Revolution, many single-children are inclined to spend large amounts of money on themselves and thus are a cornerstone of retail sales. Families which are well-off economically sometimes allow their children to indulge in the new materialistic sphere, while poorer families often still make efforts to keep their children inside the consumers' race, allowing them to purchase new clothes, new cell-phone brands, etc..

== Post-'80s in Hong Kong ==
Post-'80 in Hong Kong and the after-eighty generation in mainland China are for the most part different. The term Post-'80 (Chinese: 八十後) came into use in Hong Kong between 2009 and 2010, particularly during the course of the opposition to the Guangzhou-Hong Kong Express Rail Link, during which a group of young activists came to the forefront of the Hong Kong political scene. They are said to be "post-materialist" in outlook, and they are particularly vocal in issues such as urban development, culture and heritage, and political reform. Their campaigns include the fight for the preservation of Lee Tung Street, the Star Ferry Pier and the Queen's Pier, Choi Yuen Tsuen Village, real political reform, and a citizen-oriented West Kowloon Cultural District. Their discourse mainly develops around themes such as anti-colonialism, sustainable development, and democracy.

== Post-'80s in Canada ==
According to the Canadian Census, among the population that was never married, there was a large increase in the proportions for those in their 20s and 30s in 2011 in comparison to 1981. For young adults aged 25 to 29, the proportion who were never married increased from 26.0% of the population in 1981 to close to 73.1% in 2011. Even among individuals in their early 30s, the proportion of men who were never married increased from 15.0% in 1981 to 54.0% in 2011. For women, the increase was from 10.5% in 1981 to 43.4% in 2011.

== See also ==
- Fuerdai
- Tang ping
- Millennials
- Strawberry generation

People born in other periods are also named in the same way in Mainland China.

- The Post-'70s (七零后) is used to describe Chinese people born in the 1970s.
- The Post-'90s (九零后) means people born from 1990 to 1999 in urban areas. They are usually concerted to martial characters and non-mainstream culture. This generation has similar traits to post-'80 such as being open to premarital sex, but to an even greater degree. It also has a much larger male surplus population than the post-80s, who already have a significant gap between the male and female population. As birth rates rapidly fell between 1990 and 1991 following the Tiananmen Square massacre this cohort is much smaller than the post-80s generation.
- The Pre-'60s (六零前) means people born before the year 1960.
