= Internet café =

Café that provides public Internet access

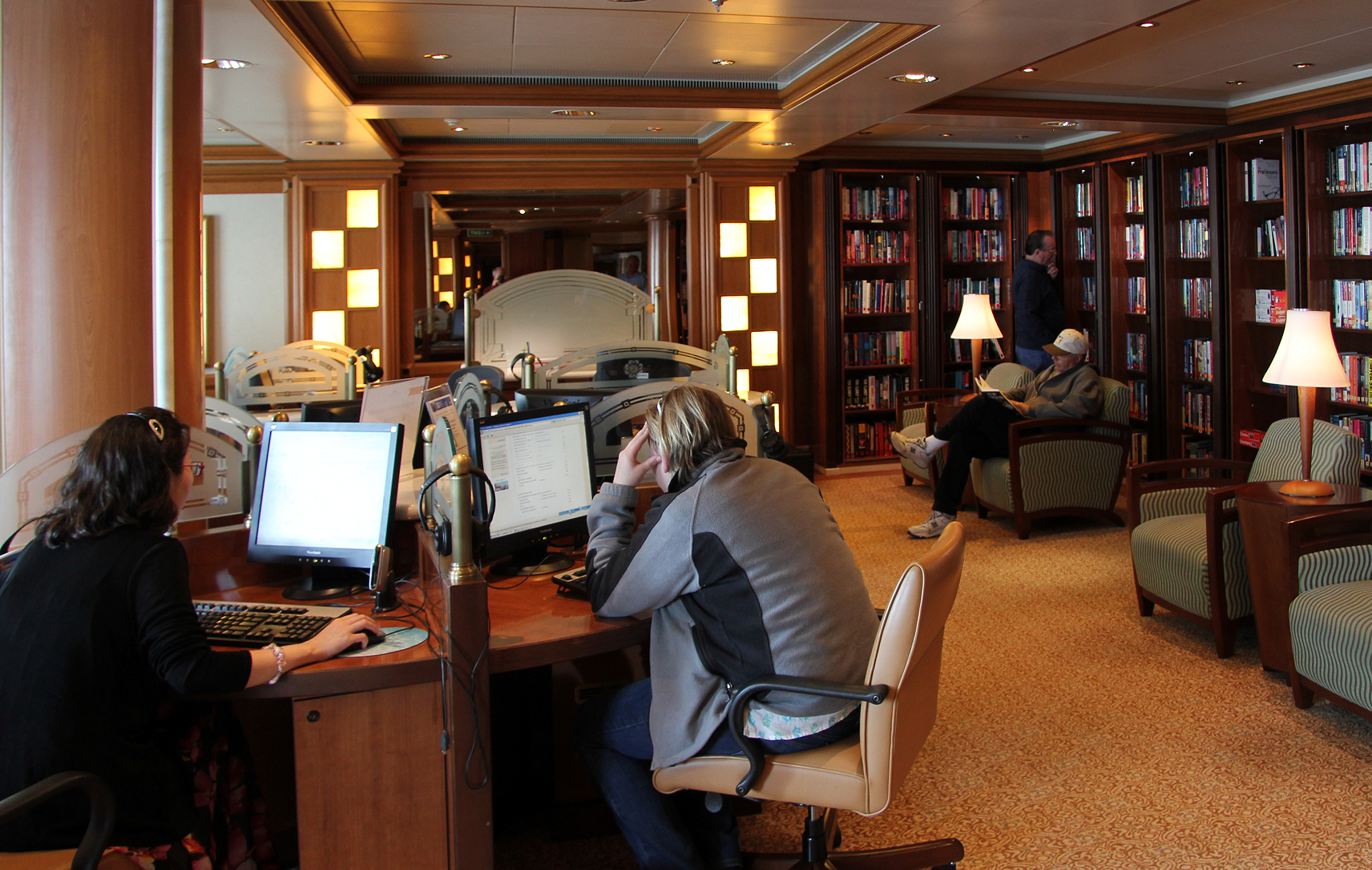
Internet café and library on the Golden Princess cruise ship (2011)

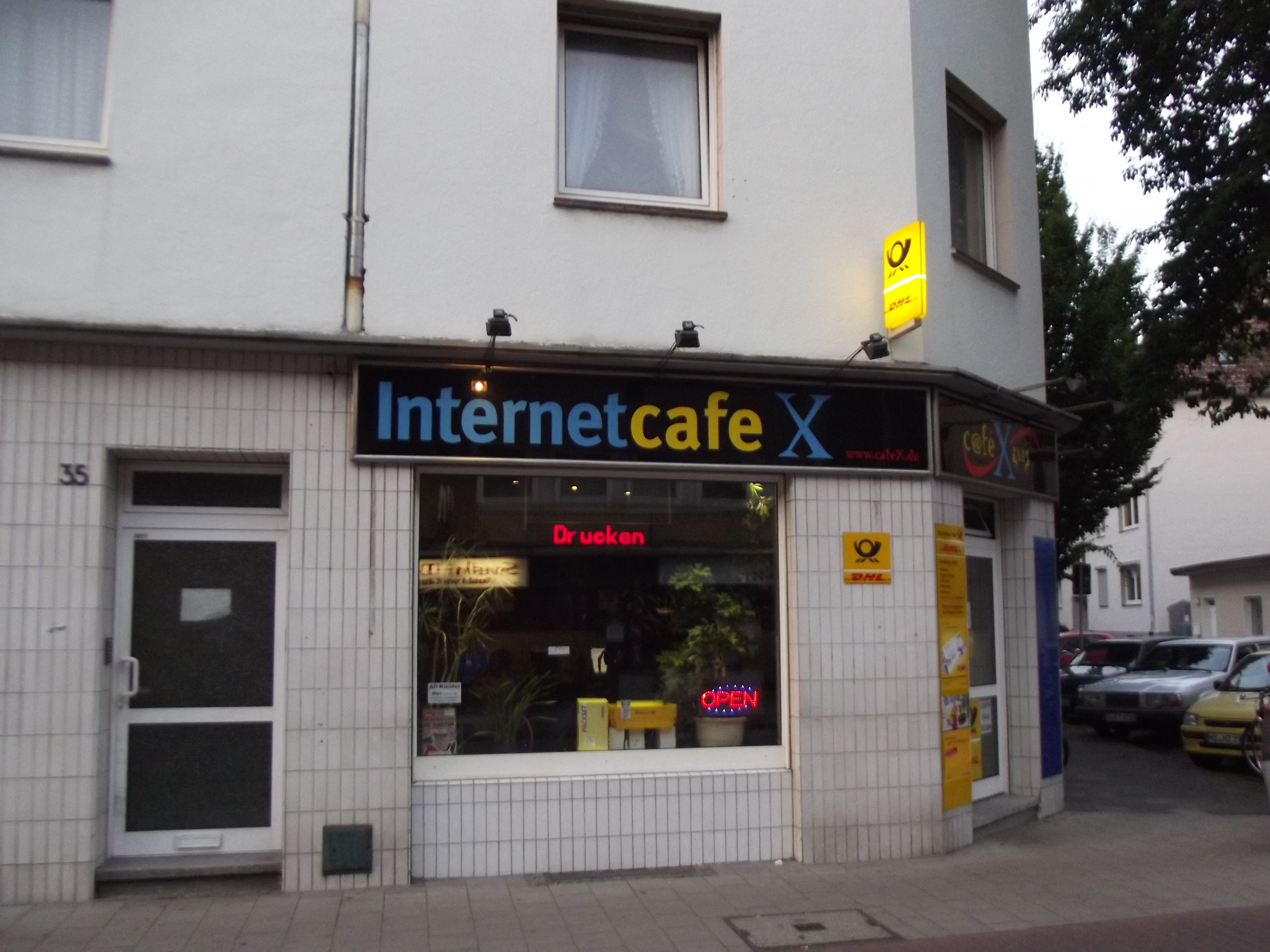
Combination Internet café and sub post office in Münster, Germany

An Internet café, also known as a cybercafé, is a café (or a convenience store or a fully dedicated Internet access business) that provides the use of computers with high bandwidth Internet access on the payment of a fee. Usage is generally charged by the minute or part of hour. An Internet café will generally also offer refreshments or other services such as phone repair. Internet cafés are often hosted within a shop or other establishment. They are located worldwide, and many people use them when traveling to access webmail and instant messaging services to keep in touch with family and friends. Apart from travelers, in many developing countries Internet cafés are the primary form of Internet access for citizens as a shared-access model is more affordable than personal ownership of equipment and/or software. Internet cafés are a natural evolution of the traditional café. As Internet access rose many pubs, bars, and cafés added terminals and eventually Wi-Fi hotspots, eroding the distinction between the Internet café and normal cafés. In recent years, traditional internet cafés have experienced a significant decline in developed countries due to the widespread availability of personal internet access devices. Conversely, in regions like Southeast Asia, internet cafés have evolved into esports cafés, serving as community hubs for gamers and training grounds for professional players.

== Pre-internet online cafés ==
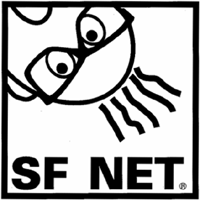
SF Net logo c. 1993, San Francisco, California

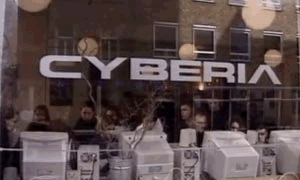
Cyberia, an early Internet café in London, 1994

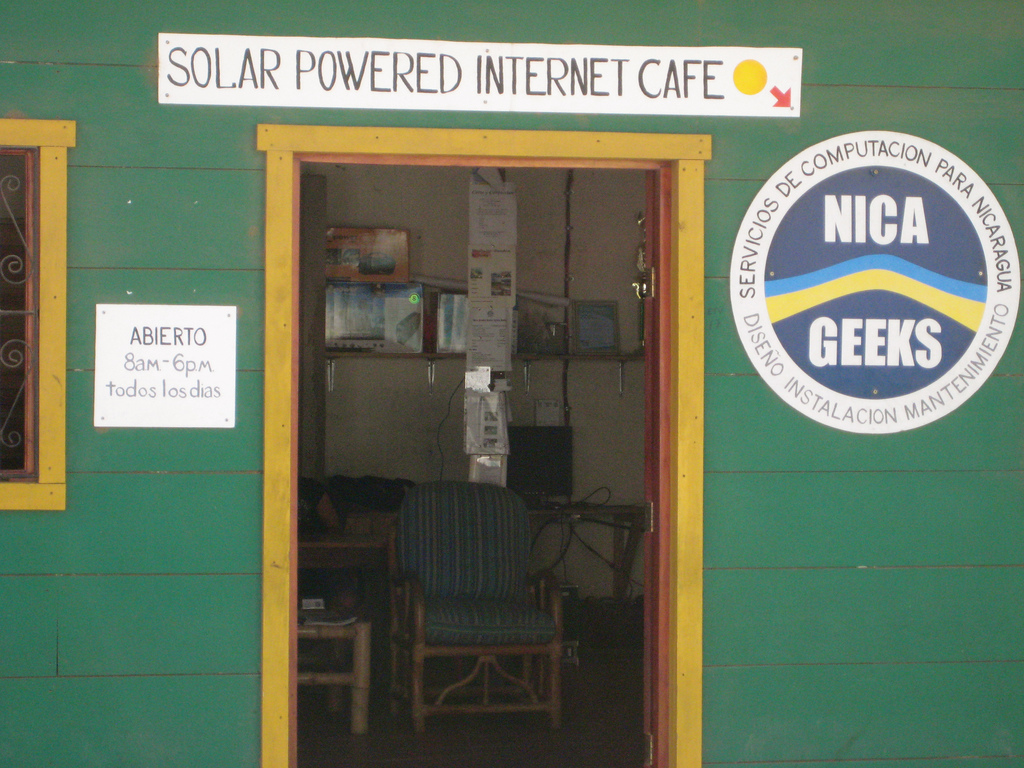
A solar powered Internet café in Nicaragua

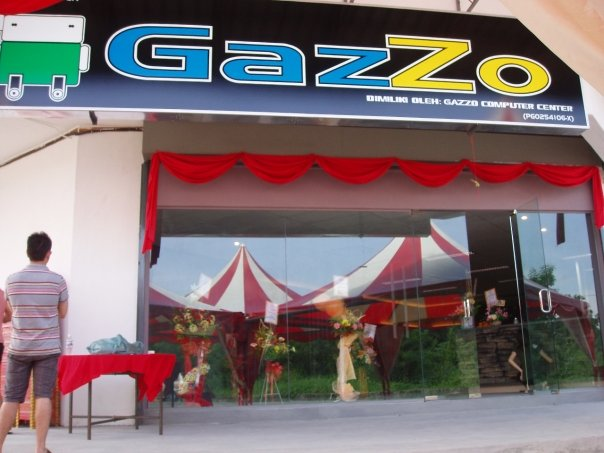
An Internet café in Malaysia

The early history of public access to online networking sites is largely unwritten and undocumented. Many experiments can lay claim to being precursors to internet cafés.

In March 1988, the 'Electronic Café' was opened near Hongik University in Seoul, South Korea by Ahn Sang-soo (Professor of Hongik University) and Gum Nu-ri (Professor of Kookmin University). Two 16-bit computers connected to online service networks through telephone lines. Offline meetings were held in the café, which served as a place that connected online and offline activities.

In July 1991, the SFnet Coffeehouse Network was opened in San Francisco, United States by Wayne Gregori. Gregori installed coin-operated computer terminals in coffeehouses throughout the San Francisco Bay Area. The terminals dialed into a 32 line Bulletin Board System that offered an array of electronic services including FIDOnet mail and, in 1992, Internet mail.

== Internet cafés ==
The concept of a café with full Internet access (and the name Cybercafé) was invented in early 1994 by Ivan Pope. Commissioned to develop an Internet event for an arts weekend at the Institute of Contemporary Arts (ICA) in London, and inspired by the SFnet terminal based cafés, Pope wrote a proposal outlining the concept of a café with Internet access. For the event Seduced and Abandoned: The Body in the Virtual World. Over the weekend of March 12–13 in the theatre at the ICA, Pope ran a Cybercafé which consisted of multiple Apple Mac computers on café style tables with menus of available services.

In June 1994, The Binary Café, Canada's first Internet café, opened in Toronto, Ontario, according to Security and Software for Cybercafés.

Inspired partly by the ICA event and associated with an Internet provider startup, EasyNet, in the same building, a commercial Internet café called Cyberia opened on September 1, 1994, in London, England. ArtsEmerson credits it as London's first cybercafé, although it also claims it opened before The Binary Café.

The first public, commercial American Internet café was conceived and opened by Jeff Anderson and Alan Weinkrantz in August 1994, at Infomart in Dallas, Texas, and was called The High Tech Cafe.

A bar called CompuCafé was established in Helsinki, Finland in September 1993 and relocated to larger premises in October 1994 featuring both Internet access and a robotic beer seller.

In January 1995, the CB1 Café in Cambridge installed an Internet connection. It was the longest running Internet Café in the UK, ultimately closing down in 2015.

The Scottish Bar in French-speaking Switzerland was started on June 27, 1995 by Pierre Hemmer.

In June 1995, three Internet cafés opened in the East Village neighborhood of New York City: Internet Cafe, opened by Arthur Perley, the @Cafe, and the Heroic Sandwich. In 1996, the Internet café Surf City opened in downtown Anchorage, Alaska.

Since early 2010s, the rising popularity of smartphones, due to improved hardware and faster internet connectivity (LTE and 5G NR), started having a major economic impact on internet cafés. It has been estimated that the number of internet cafés in South Korea dropped 17% from 19,000 in 2010 to 15,800 in 2012, and internet cafés in developing countries were struggling to grow.

In China, a 2011 government report stated that 130,000 internet cafés had closed down over the previous six years, due to tightening regulations, which brought the number down to 144,000. One industry consultant estimated the number had reached 136,000 in 2012.

In some locations, however, internet cafés continued to be used for reasons ranging from evading gambling regulations to building communities of language learners. As of 2021, internet cafés are still operating in South Korea for online gaming.

In September 2024 the National Communication Museum in Melbourne opened, featuring a Cyber Cafe. It was developed with Rita Arrigo, who opened Australia's first internet cafè in 1995.

== Characteristics ==
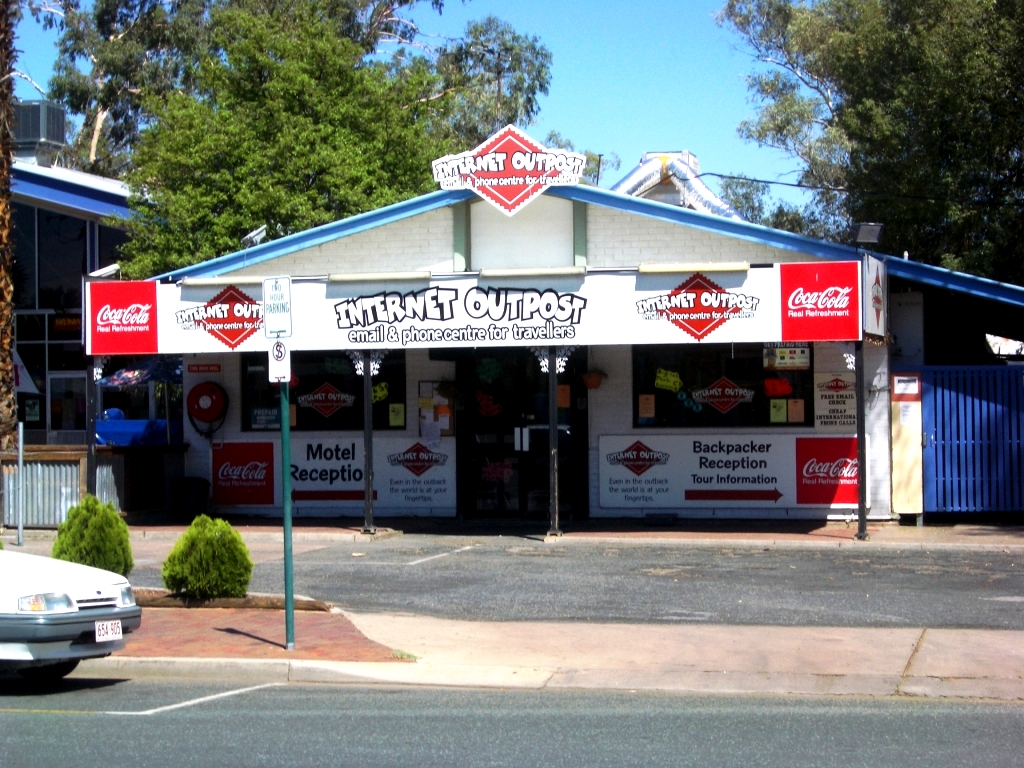
Internet cafe, Alice Springs, Australia, pictured 2005

While most Internet cafés are private businesses many have been set up to help bridge the 'digital divide', providing computer access and training to those without home access. There are also Internet kiosks, Internet access points in public places like public libraries, airport halls, sometimes just for brief use while standing.

Many hotels, resorts, and cruise ships offer Internet access for the convenience of their guests; this can take various forms, such as in-room wireless access, or a web browser that uses the in-room television set for its display (usually in this case the hotel provides a wireless keyboard on the assumption that the guest will use it from the bed), or computer(s) that guests can use, in either the lobby or a business center. As with telephone service, in the U.S., most mid-price hotels offer Internet access from computers in the lobby to registered guests without charging an additional fee, while fancier hotels are more likely to charge for the use of computers in their business centers.

For those traveling by road in North America, many truck stops have Internet kiosks, for which a typical charge is around 20 cents per minute.

Internet cafés come in a wide range of styles, reflecting their location, main clientele, and sometimes, the social agenda of the proprietors. In the early days, they were important in projecting the image of the Internet as a 'cool' phenomenon.

A variation on the Internet café business model is the LAN gaming center, used for multiplayer gaming. These cafés have several computer stations connected to a LAN. The connected computers are custom-assembled for gameplay, supporting popular multiplayer games. This is reducing the need for video arcades and arcade games, many of which are being closed down or merged into Internet cafés. The use of Internet cafés for multiplayer gaming is particularly popular in certain areas of Asia like India, the mainland of China, Taiwan, Hong Kong, South Korea and the Philippines. In some countries, since practically all LAN gaming centers also offer Internet access, the terms net café and LAN gaming center have become interchangeable. Again, this shared-access model is more affordable than personal ownership of equipment and/or software, especially since games often require high end and expensive PCs.

Gaming is extremely popular at internet cafés in Asia, which has helped create strong demand and a sustainable business model for most cafés. However, with this growing popularity also comes more responsibility. To compete for market share, internet cafés have started charging less, and turned to alternate ways to maximize revenue. This includes selling food, drinks, and gaming and phone cards to patrons.

== Legal issues ==
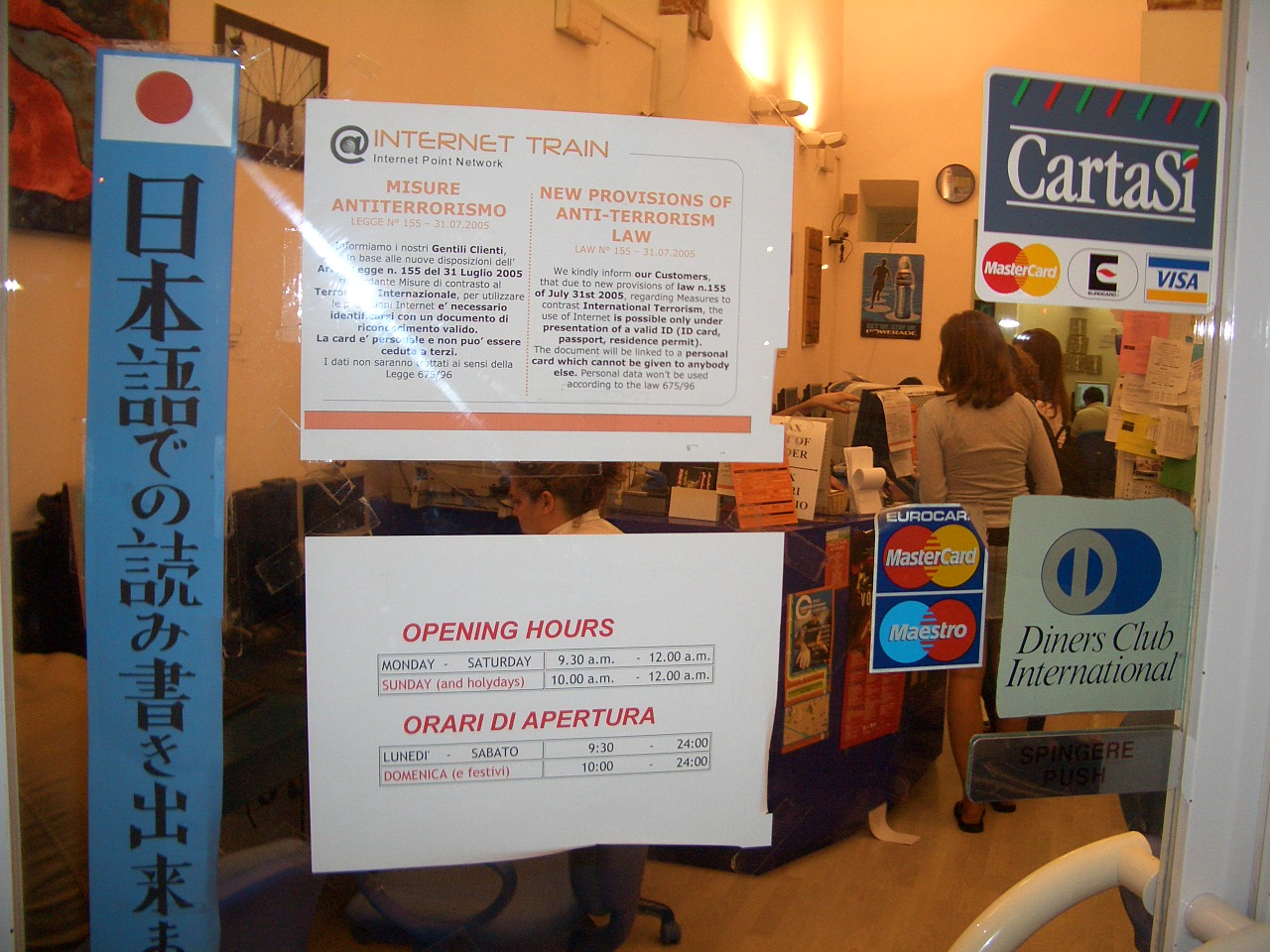
A notice about anti-terrorism related ID requirements on the door of an Italian Internet café. (Florence, May 2006)

In 2003 in Great Britain, the EasyInternetcafé chain was found liable for copyright infringement occurring when customers used its CD-burning service to burn illegally downloaded music to their own CDs.

In 2005 Italy began requiring entities such as Internet cafés to collect photocopies of the passports of Internet, phone, or fax-using customers as a result of anti-terrorism legislation passed in July of that year.

By 2010, a variation of the Internet café known as a "sweepstakes parlor" had become widespread in certain regions of the United States. These facilities offered entries in a contest to customers who purchase Internet usage. Sweepstakes parlors faced scrutiny by local governments, who argued that sweepstakes parlors are a form of illegal gambling. A large number of these locations faced raids by officials, while a number of states enacted laws to ban them.

There are European countries where the total number of publicly accessible terminals is also decreasing. An example of such a country is Germany. The cause of this development is a combination of complicated regulation, relatively high Internet penetration rates, the widespread use of notebooks, tablets, and smartphones and the relatively high number of wireless internet hotspots. Many pubs, bars and cafés in Germany offer wireless Internet, but no terminals since the Internet café regulations do not apply if no terminal is offered. Additionally, the use of Internet cafés for multiplayer gaming is very difficult in Germany since the Internet café regulations and a second type of regulations which was originally established for video arcade centres applies to this kind of Internet cafés. It is, for example, forbidden for people under the age of 18 to enter such an Internet café, although particularly people under 18 are an important group of customers for this type of Internet café.

== By country ==
=== Australia ===
Netcafe opened in St Kilda at the Deluxe Café on April 4, 1995, inspired by the Internet café phenomenon that was going on in Seattle. As Australia's first Internet café, founders included Gavin Murray, Rita Arrigo and Christopher Beaumont. Direct from London's Cyberia, they were joined by Kathryn Phelps, alongside partnerships with Adam Goudie of Standard Computers for hardware and Michael Bethune from Australia Online as their internet service provider. In 1995, internet services were delivered via a standard analogue phone line using a 9600-Baud US Robotics Modem. Cafe.on.net also opened on Rundle Street in Adelaide in 1995, founded by John Ruciak and with the support of Internode's Simon Hackett.

=== Brazil ===
In Brazil, the initial concept introduced by Monkey Paulista was based on the business model used by internet cafés in South Korea, since this was the first house LAN to exist in Brazil; it was inaugurated in São Paulo, starting its activities in 1995. The company closed in 2010. However, just a week later for reasons of bureaucracy, the company Lan Game @ The House was opened, and today is the most active LAN house of Brazil. Today it is seen in the country as a way to test new technologies and demonstrate games and other products.

=== China ===
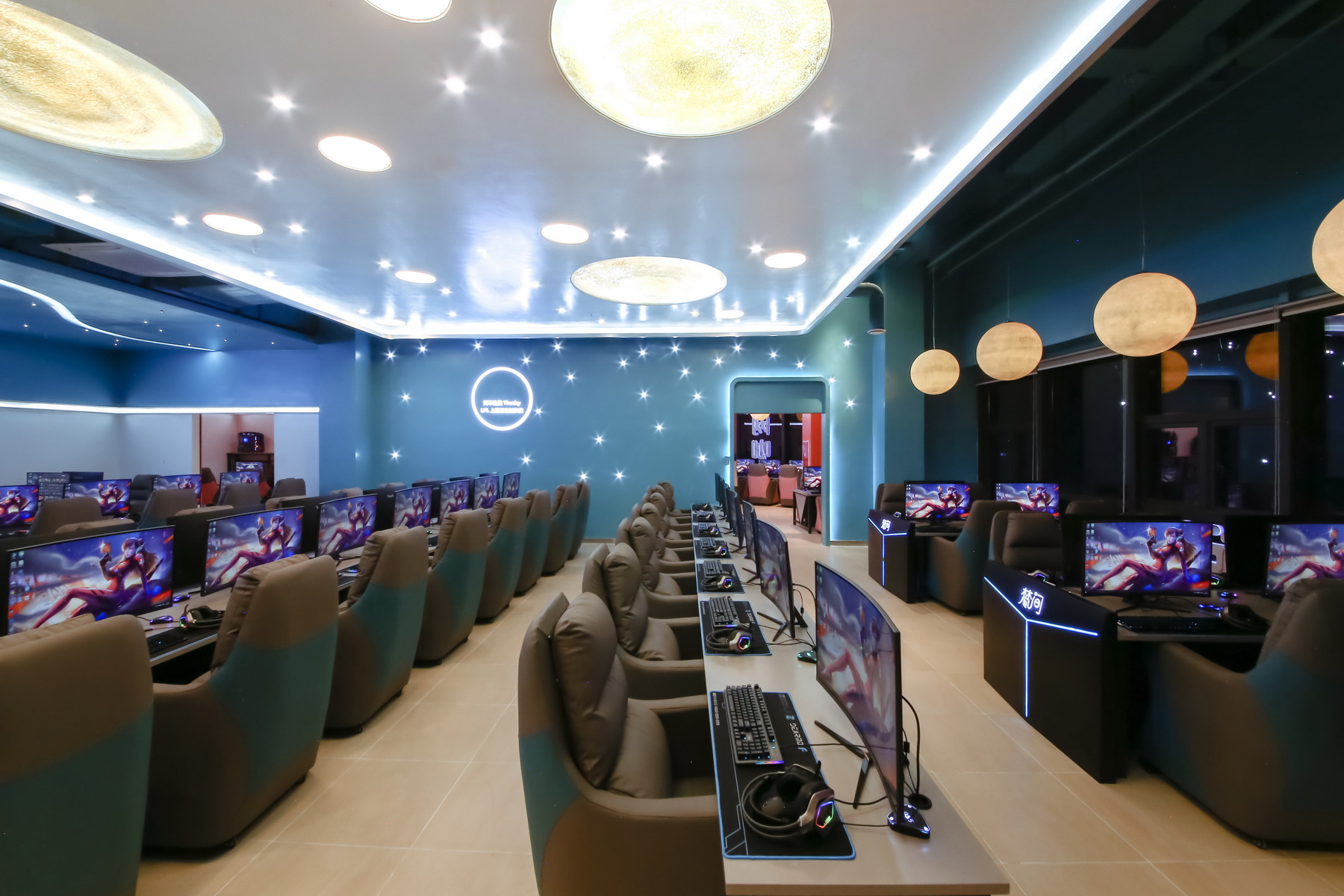
Internet café in Chengdu, China

According to the "Survey of China Internet Café Industry" by the People's Republic of China Ministry of Culture in 2005, Mainland China had 110,000 Internet cafés, with more than 1,000,000 employees contributing 18,500,000,000 yuan to mainland China's GDP. More than 70% of Internet café visitors are from 18 to 30 years old. 90% are male, 65% are unmarried, and 54% hold a university degree. More than 70% of visitors play computer games. 20% of China's Internet users go to Internet cafés.

=== India ===
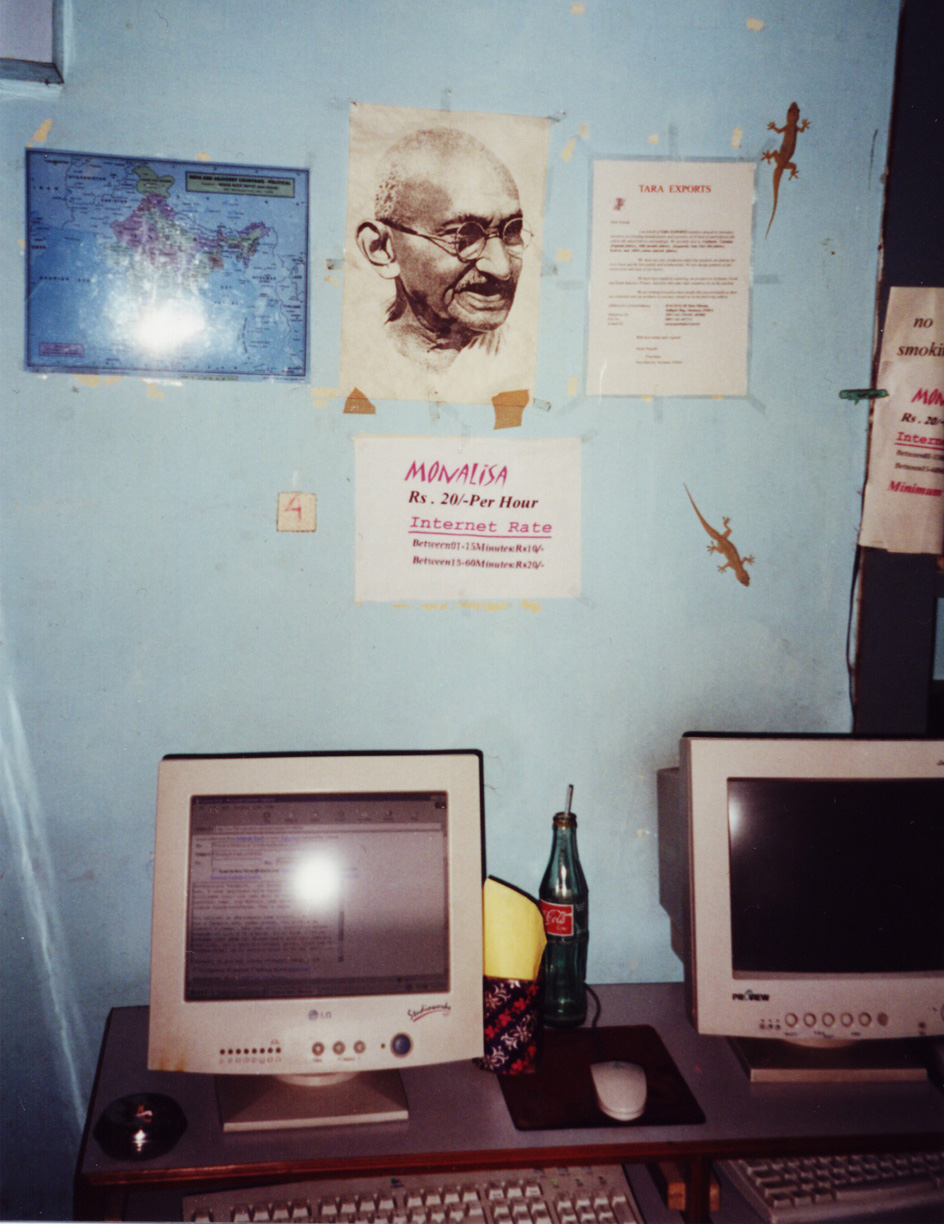
An Internet cafe Varanasi, India, 2001

In India, Internet cafés used by traveling people and business have been declining since the arrival of widespread mobile Internet usage. A set of other services are also offered, such as printing of documents or webpages. Operators also help computer illiterates through some government processes (as a part of e-governance in India). Low speed of mobile Internet and services offered by Internet cafés help in the industry's survival. In India a positive government ID is compulsory for Internet café users in most states.

In 2008, there were 180,000 cyber cafes in India but by 2017, it declined to 50,000. One of the primary reasons for their decline was rules of the IT Act, which caused licensing issues and other restrictions.

=== Indonesia ===
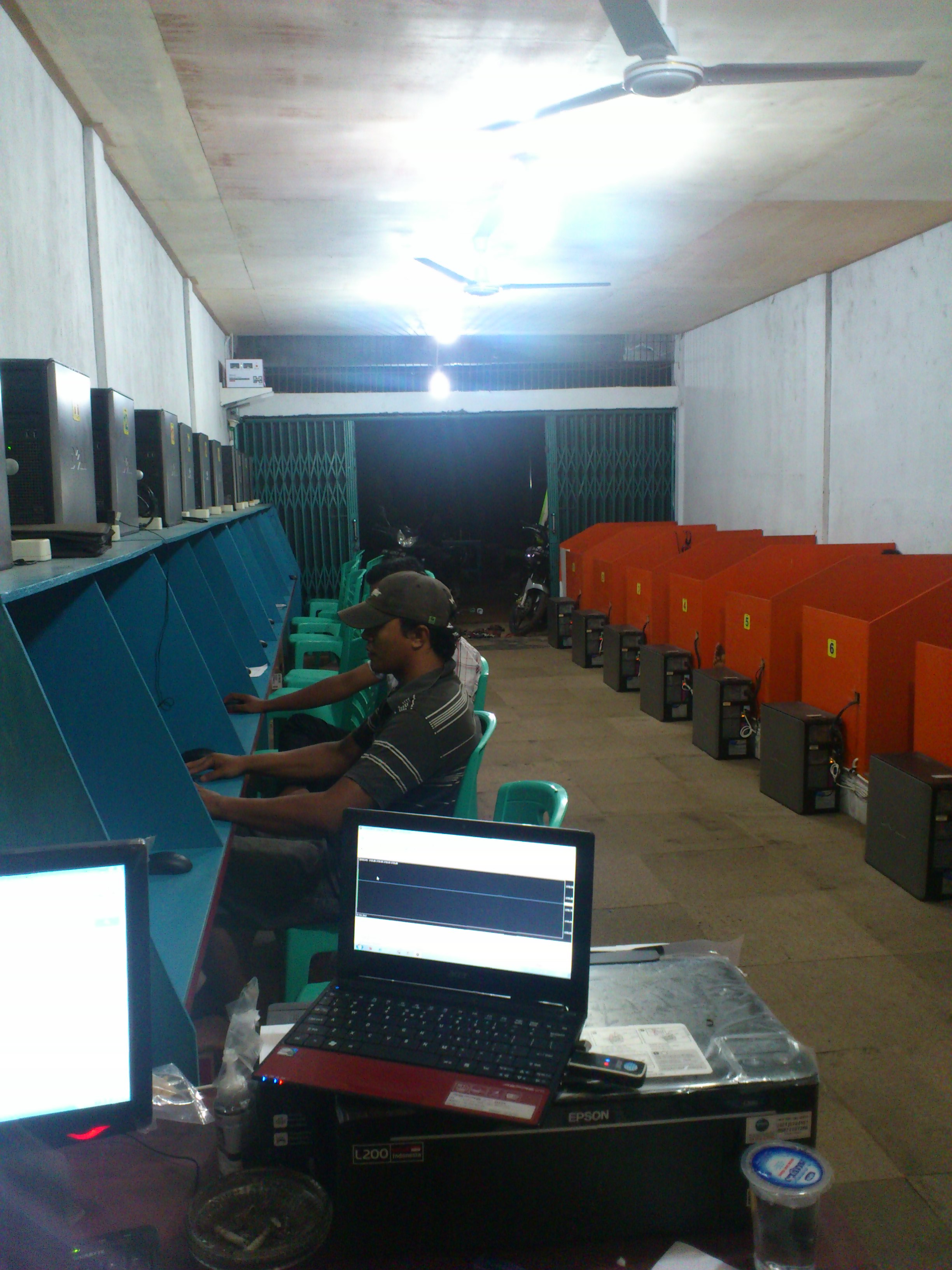
Internet café in Riau, Indonesia

According to APWKomitel (Association of Community Internet Center), there were 5,000 Internet cafés in urban Indonesian cities in 2006 providing computer/printer/scanner rentals, training, PC gaming and Internet access/rental to people without computer or internet access. The website also contains a directory listing some of these warnet/telecenter/gamecenter in Indonesia. In urban areas, the generic name is warnet (or warung Internet) and in rural areas the generic name is telecenter. Warnets/netcafes are usually privately owned as bottom-up initiatives, while telecenters in rural villages are typically government or donor-funded as top-down financing. Information on netcafe/warnet in Indonesia can also be found in a book titled: Connected for Development: Indonesian Case study.

Currently, no special license is required to operate an Internet café or warnet in Indonesia, except for the ordinary business license applicable to cafes or small shops. Because of hype and poor business planning, many net cafes have closed down. Although the number of Internet cafes are growing, associations such as APWKomitel urge new Internet café owners to do a feasibility study before planning to open an Internet café, and provide a business model called multipurpose community Internet center or "MCI Center" to make the business more sustainable and competitive. Hourly usage rate varies between Rp 2500–15000 ($0,27 – 1,60)

=== Japan ===
Japan has a strong internet café culture, with most serving a dual purpose as joint Internet-manga cafes. Most chains (like Media Cafe Popeye and Jiyū Kūkan) offer customers a variety of seating options, including normal chair, massage chair, couch, and flat mat. Customers are then typically given unlimited access to soft drinks, manga, magazines, Internet, online video games, and online pornography. Most offer food and shower services for an additional fee. In fact, many purchase "night packs" and shower/sleep in the cafes, giving rise to a phenomenon known as "net cafe refugees" or "net cafe homeless".

=== Kenya ===
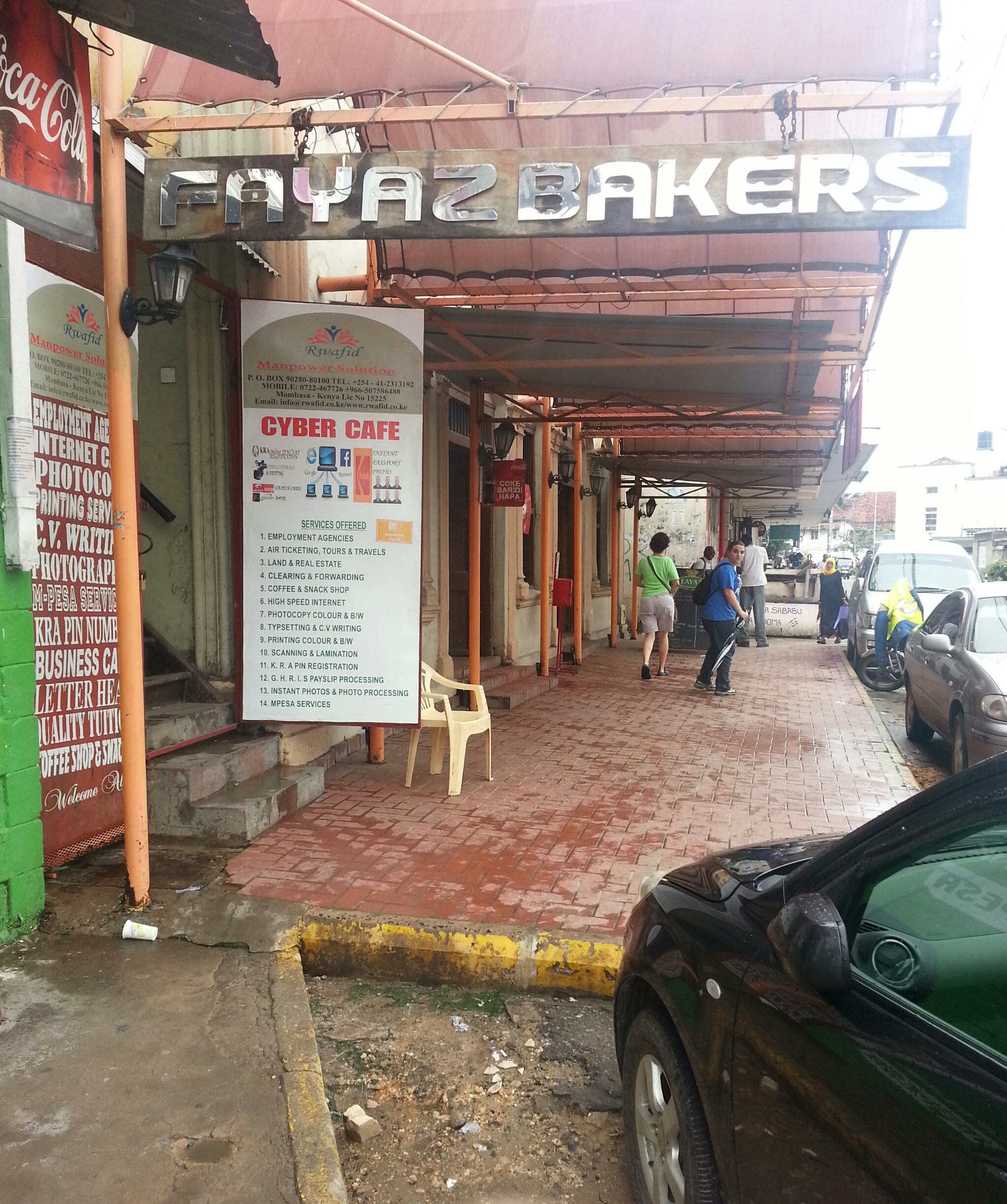
An Internet café in Mombasa, Kenya, combined with other services

Internet cafés are prevalent in the city of Mombasa, as poverty and unreliable infrastructure do not make a personal internet connection a viable option for many citizens. The cafés are often combined with a variety of other businesses, such as chemists, manicurists, repair shops, and convenience stores. Video gaming has become particularly profitable in internet cafés in Kenya in recent years.. In December 2024, the Communications Authority proposed reclassifying internet cafes as their own license category, distinct from Public Communication Access Centres (PCACs). This proposal included stricter record keeping of user activity.

=== Philippines ===
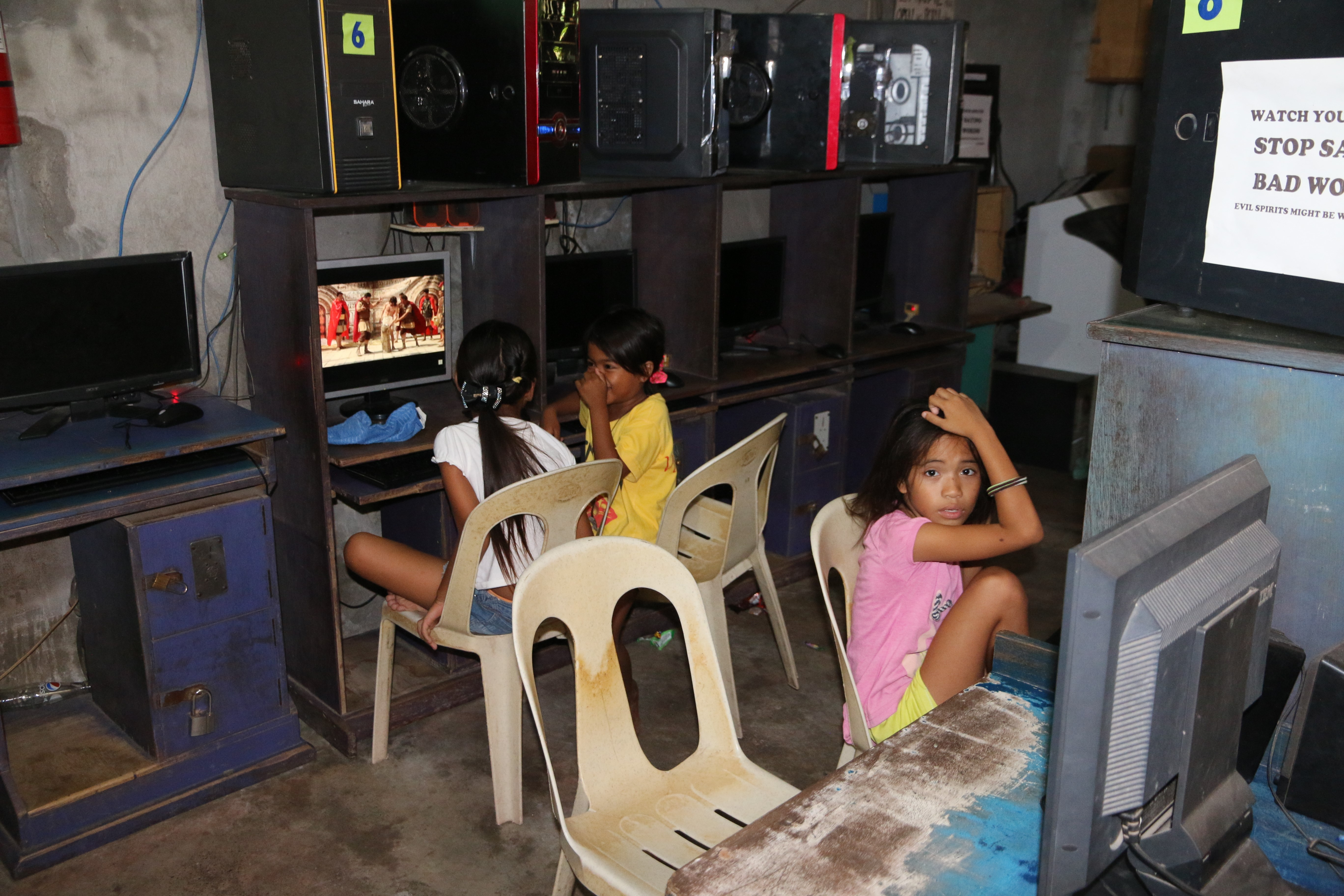
An Internet café in Cebu City, Philippines. A partially out of sight paper signage forbidding profanity is seen on the right, while two girls in the background are watching a depiction of the Flagellation of Christ.

In the Philippines, internet cafés, also known as computer shops (often abbreviated to comshop), are found on almost every street in major cities; and there is at least one in most municipalities or towns. There are also internet cafés in coffee shops and malls. High-end restaurants and fast food chains also provide free broadband to diners. Occasionally some internet cafés offer gadget repairs, print or photocopying, and other services. Rates range from P10 (US$0.20) per hour or less, depending on PC specifications) on streets, and up to P100 ($2) per hour in malls. In some major cities with existing ordinances regulating internet cafés (e.g. Valenzuela, Marikina, Davao, Lapu-lapu and Zamboanga), students who are below 18 years of age are prohibited from playing computer games during regular class hours. Depending on the city, regulations vary in their exact details and implementation. Such city ordinances usually also require internet café owners to:

- Install filtering software to block adult oriented sites
- Prohibit the sales of alcoholic drinks and cigarettes inside their establishment
- Allow open view of rented computers (i.e. no closed cubicles)
- Provide a 50% transparent front wall panel, to allow a clear view of the interior of the establishment
- Provide adequate lighting both inside and outside of the establishment to allow a clear view of the interior at all times
- Sometimes install a CCTV for increased security
- loitering and being in the state of undress is not allowed at all times
- In some occasions, brawling and trashtalking is strictly prohibited when it comes to online game matches

=== Poland ===
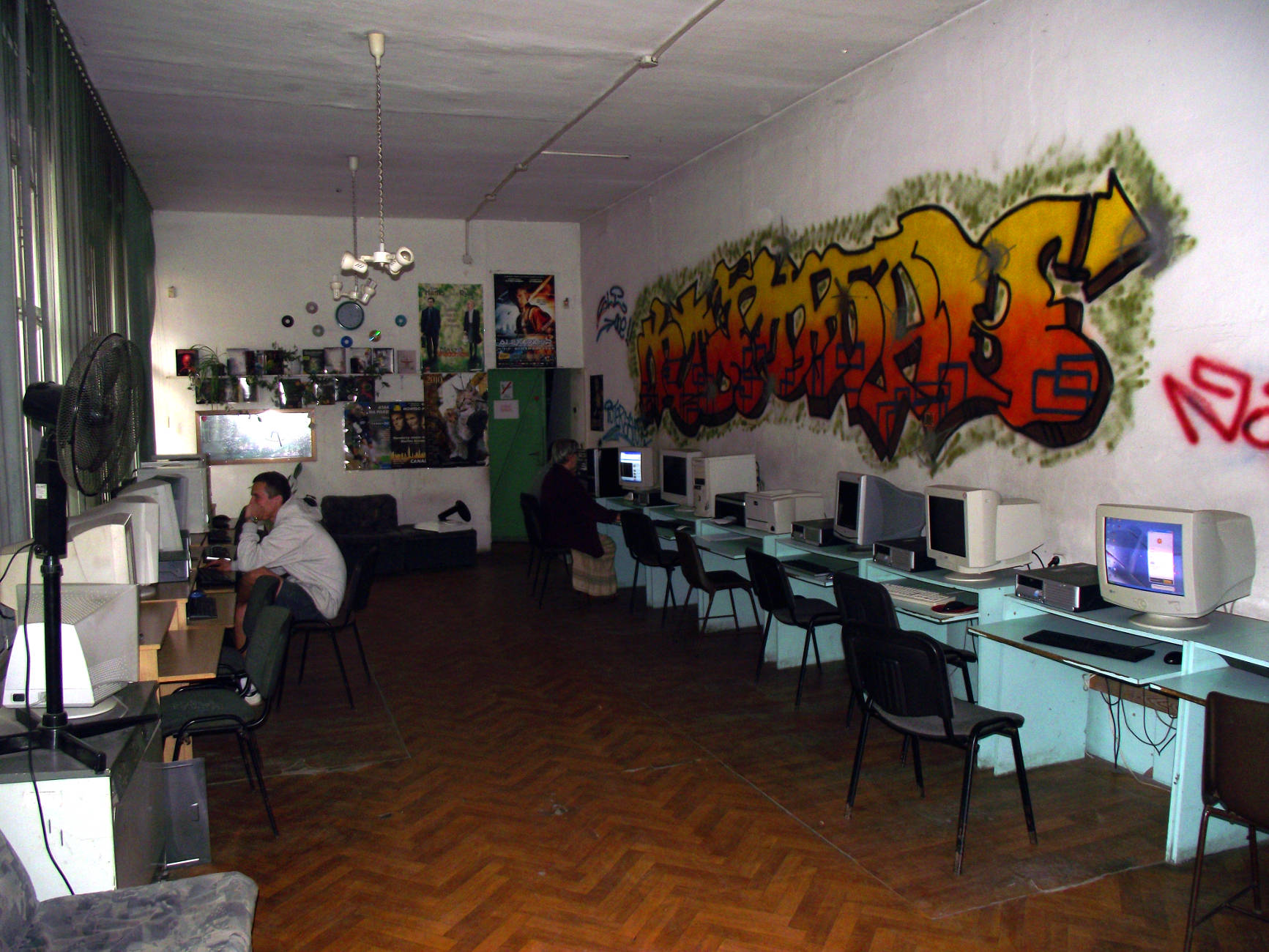
An Internet café in Bielsko-Biała, Poland, in 2014

The first Internet café in Poland was opened in 1996. Such establishments soon became very popular among the Polish population, especially young people, who at the time still rarely had access to computers with high-speed Internet at home. They were commonly used to play games like Icy Tower or Counter-Strike, as well as for instant messaging on the Gadu-Gadu client. Internet cafés began losing popularity after Telekomunikacja Polska launched the ADSL Neostrada service in 2001, providing home Internet access to many Poles, and most establishments were shut down by the 2010s.

=== Slovakia ===
In Slovakia, the first Internet café was opened officially in the city of Košice on July 17, 1996, providing services such as e-mail, Gopher, News, Telnet, WWW, Talk and others to the general public.

=== South Korea ===
In South Korea, Internet cafés are called PC bangs. They are ubiquitous in South Korean cities, numbering over 20,000. PC bangs mostly cater to online game playing for the younger generation. On average and mode, use of a PC bang computer is priced at around 1,000 won per hour (about $0.88 USD).

=== Spain ===
In Spain, the first Internet café was opened officially in the city of Oviedo, the capital city of the Principality of Asturias, on December 19, 1995.

=== Taiwan ===
Internet cafés are omnipresent in Taiwan, and especially concentrated in major cities, namely Taipei and Kaohsiung.

The Internet café is called a "網咖" (Wǎng kā) in traditional Chinese. The first character literally means "net" and the second character is the first syllable of "café."The rate is consistent at about NT$10~20 in the most part, but prominent districts, such as the Eastern District of Taipei, can charge users up to NT$35 per hour. With the growth of smartphone ownership and free Wi-Fi networks in all major public attractions, the Internet cafés now primarily cater to gamers, and some even provide food and drinks.

=== Vietnam ===
In Vietnam, almost every internet café advertises itself as a game center. Many internet cafés charge a fairly low fee, usually the equivalent of $0.20 – $0.75 an hour. Services such as food and drink are also often available. "Internet café" in Vietnamese is quán net or tiệm net (quán or tiệm means "store" and net is "Internet").

=== United States ===
Reputedly, the first kosher cybercafe was the IDT Cafe in New York City's diamond district, opened in the spring of 1997.

Internet cafés were prevalent in the 1990s but began to decline in popularity due to the expansion of home-based email and broadband internet access points, as well as the later deployment of Wi-Fi and smartphones. As of 2022, LAN gaming centers can be found in metropolitan areas in the United States. Gaming centers are not as popular in the US compared to East Asia. Like those in Asia, gaming centers typically offer Internet access, food, and drinks.

== See also ==
- Capsule hotel
- Kiosk software
- Public computer
- Public internet booths
- Software bundled discounts
