= Public internet booths =

Public internet booths are free-standing structures intended to provide public internet access and are analogous to payphones for telephone service. They differ from internet cafes in that they do not offer food or beverages.

== In Peru ==
Peruvian public internet cabins were designed to enable those who do not have a PC or connection to the Internet to go online.

It is estimated that 6 out of 10 households access the internet In metropolitan Lima, Peru using these booths.

Only 39.2% of the population 6 and older has Internet access at home.

== In Australia ==
In Australia telecommunications giant Telstra has introduced Telstra Air, a Free National Wifi Network for recipients of their mobile subscription, The network consisted of a mobile app, as well as a paid internet via Fon Wifi. These networks would both consist of a captive portal
