= Caffe Mediterraneum =

Café in Berkeley, California, United States

Coordinates: 37°51′56.16″N 122°15′30.3″W

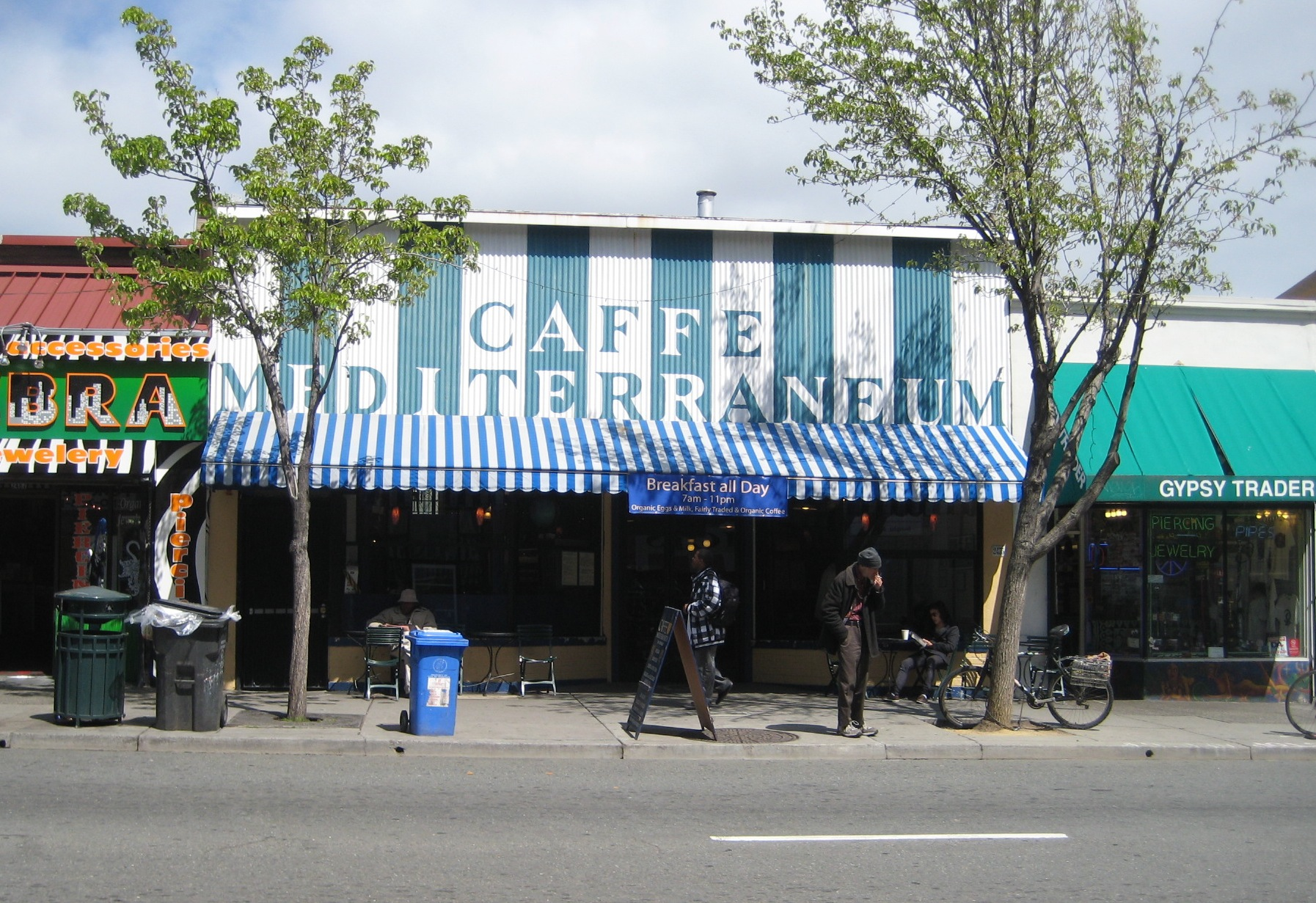
Caffe Mediterraneum storefront

Caffe Mediterraneum, often referred to as Caffe Med or simply the Med, was a coffeehouse located on Telegraph Avenue in Berkeley, California, US, near the University of California, Berkeley. The Med was a landmark of Telegraph Avenue history, "listed for years in European guide books as 'the gathering place for 1960s radicals who created People's Park'", and as of 2009 described in Fodor's guide book as "a relic of 1960s-era café culture". It was located at 2475 Telegraph Avenue, between Dwight Way and Haste Street.

== History ==
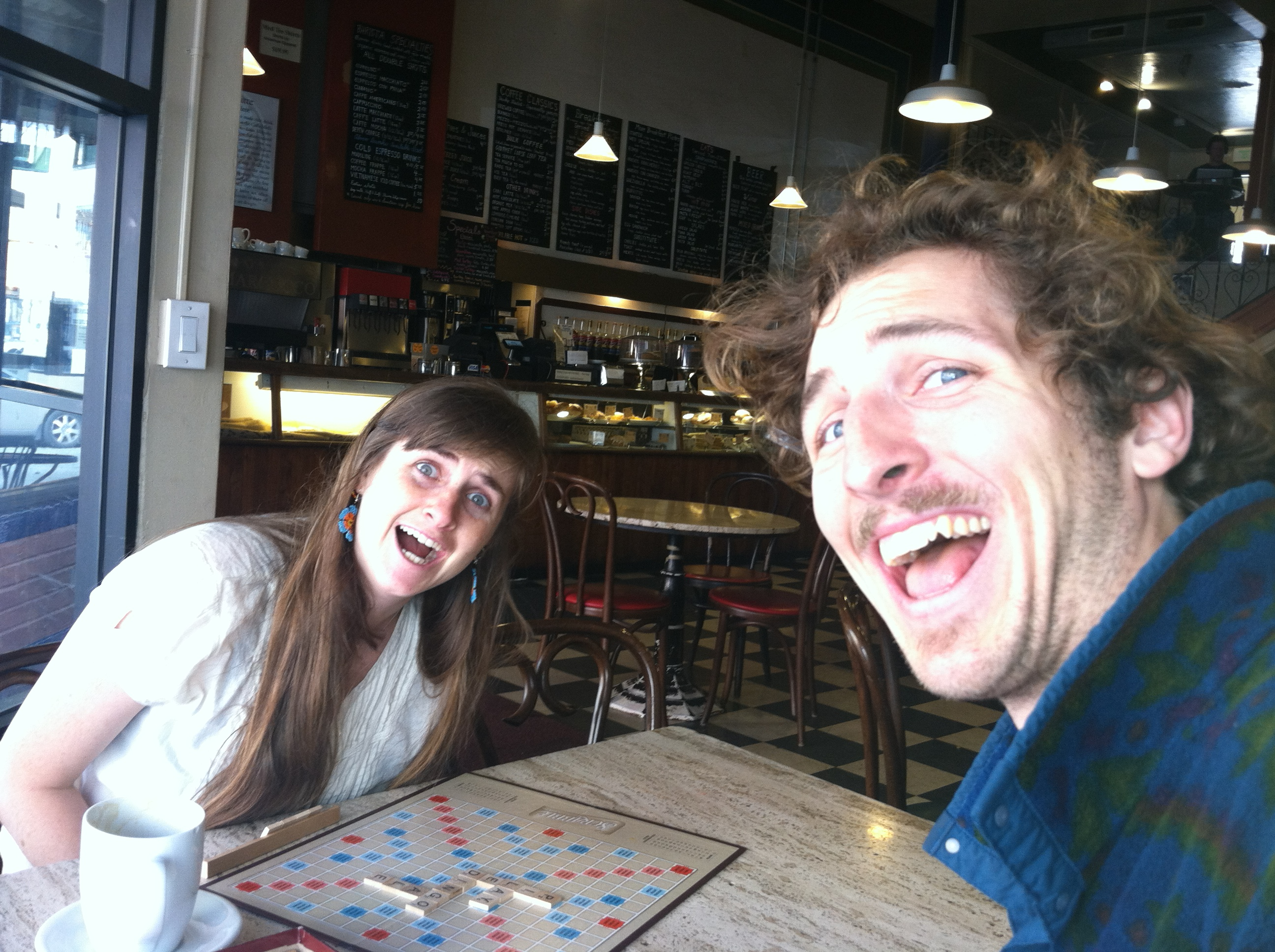
Board games such as Scrabble were played at the Med.

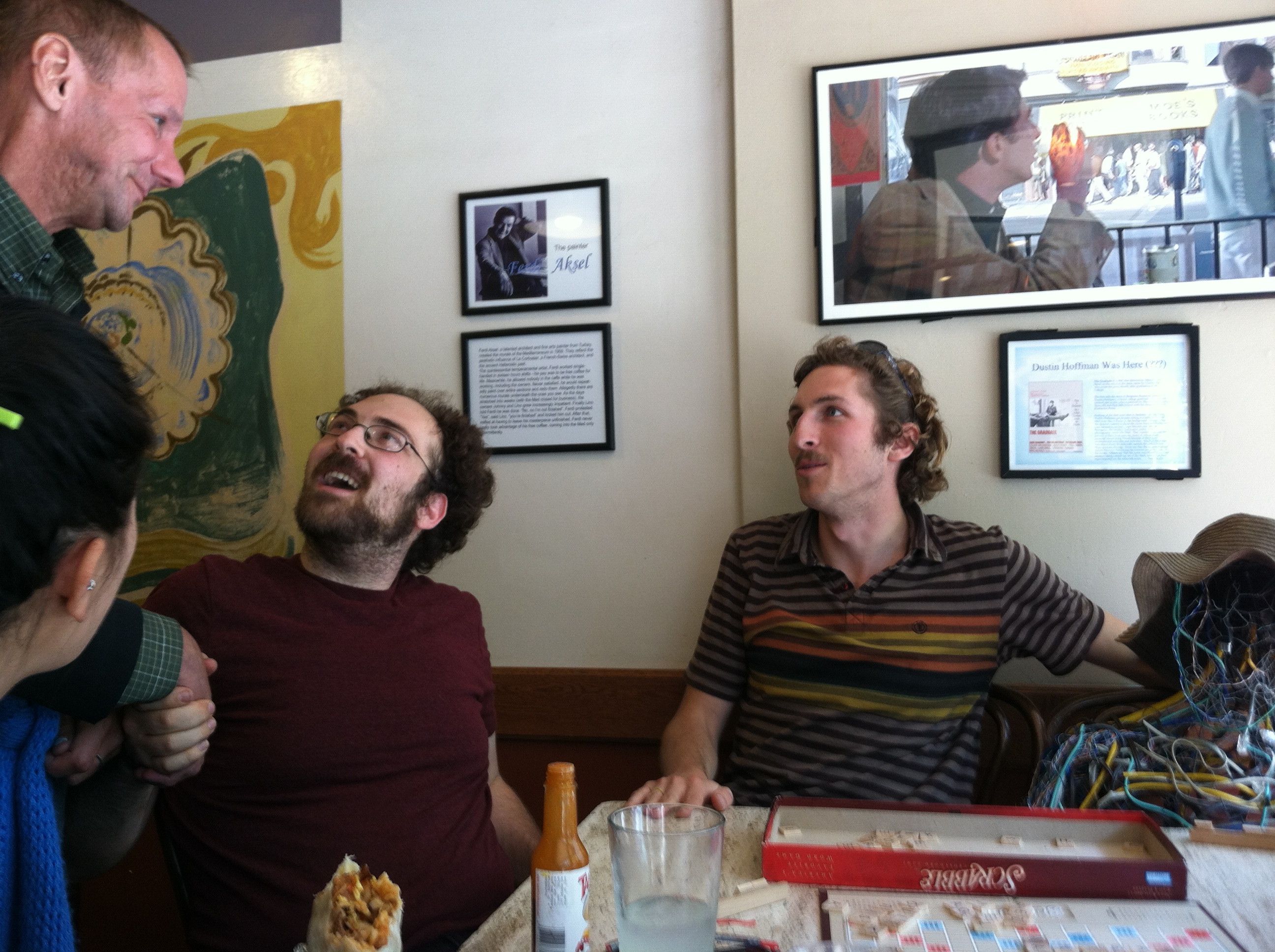
Coffee culture, meeting with friends new and old

Established as a coffeehouse inside a bookstore in 1956 under the name Il Piccolo by Maxine Chitarin before being renamed in 1957, the Med was "one of the oldest coffeehouses in the Bay Area" and "the oldest coffeehouse in the East Bay".

During the 1960s, the Med featured a diverse crowd of patrons, and it became a meeting place for Beat Generation artists, intellectuals, black power advocates, and activists who were taking part in the Free Speech Movement and post-FSM activism. During this era, the Med also played a role in two important pieces of art. Allen Ginsberg was a regular at the Med and probably wrote Howl on the premises of the Med. Although the owner at the time initially refused access to the film crews, a scene in 1967's The Graduate starring Dustin Hoffman was also filmed at a table in the Med, with Telegraph Avenue visible outside the window.

Of Telegraph Avenue, "many city officials and merchants say the avenue has lost its vibrancy" since the 1960s, but "until the 1990s, the Med thrived as a center for conversation and caffeine". Changes in ownership took a toll though, and at that point, employees say the Med "took a turn for the worse" as it was "bordering on a homeless shelter". However, with another change in ownership 2006, the Med again became "a destination for activists seeking social change".

On November 30, 2016, the Med closed for renovations. As of 2022, the location of the Caffe Mediterraneum has since been converted to Sizzling Lunch, a chain Japanese restaurant.

== See also ==
- Cody's Books
- Southside, Berkeley, California
- SF Net, a Bay Area-based computer system linking coffee shops together of which Caffe Mediterraneum was a part
