= The Binary Café =

- The Binary Café circa 1994

Restaurant information
- Owner: Steve Bernhardson
- Location: Canada
- Website: io.org/~bincaf/

The Binary Café was an internet cafe which was located upstairs at 502 Yonge Street in Toronto, Ontario from June 1994 to December 1994. It is significant in that it was Canada's first internet cafe. Three years after the first café installed internet access, it opened the same year as the first internet cafés in London and America. Ivan Pope had been the first to fully lay out the concept of a "cybercafé" in a London art event two months earlier the same year. It was run by Steve Bernhardson and staffed by a handful of employees/volunteers. According to a columnist, Bernhardson tried to "meld art, Internet, intellect, and 'cafe culture'" and strip computers of their associations with asocial geeks and "office culture".

The full name of the establishment was "The Binary Café and Hexadecimal Emporium", selling food (prepared sandwiches, holographic chocolates), drinks (coffee, soda, no alcohol) and cigarettes as well as a variety of magazines. It was located in a converted residential flat up a staircase from a door on Yonge Street, under a sign covered in binary digits. A small display case contained art related to technology or cyberspace, solicited from local artists.

Internet access was available through two x86 computers, which shared a single telephone line for their PPP connection. The café had three computers as of September 1994.
