= SF Net =

Electronic bulletin board system

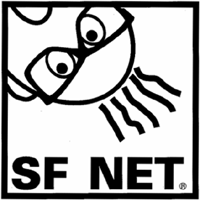
The SF Net logo

SF NET Coffee House Network was an electronic bulletin board system created by Wayne Gregori in San Francisco, California in July 1991.

The network consisted of coin-operated, public access computers installed in many Bay Area coffee houses. SF Net allowed individuals from all walks of life to communicate with each other via chat rooms and message boards. Additionally, it provided games and access to FidoNet.

The coffee shop terminals were the culmination of a series of clever solutions to the problems of long-term remote placement in areas marked by low supervision and a young crowd. According to the then-popular Boardwatch magazine, the inexpensive, hence replaceable PC XT sat inside a locked plywood cabinet with vandalism-resistant Zolatone paint and "keyboard condoms," or spill-resistant rubber coverings. Wayne Gregori engaged David Lahti as a friend and fellow visionary to help develop and operator of a popular San Francisco BBS, to develop and maintain the code base for the cafe table's communications software named, TableTalk, the BBS code base was maintained by Gregori. Lahti and Gregori developed and introduced a handshake between the coffee shop terminals and the BBS to distinguish them from other callers, ensuring paying customers could continue to use dedicated lines.

== Participating Coffee Shops ==
Name	Location
Brain Wash	1122 Folsom Street, San Francisco, California
Horseshoe Cafe	566 Haight Street, San Francisco, California
Ground Zero	783 Haight Street, San Francisco, California
Club Coffee	920 Valencia Street, San Francisco, California
The Coffee Zone	1409 Haight Street, San Francisco, California
Muddy Waters	521 Valencia Street, San Francisco, California
Jammin Java	701 Cole Street, San Francisco, California
Java Bound	1916 Irving Street, San Francisco, California
Jammin Java	1398 9th Avenue, San Francisco, California
Java Source	343 Clement Street, San Francisco, California
Laundry Cafe	570 Green Street, San Francisco, California
Caffe Roma	526 Columbus Avenue, San Francisco, California
Monday Blu's	3821 18th Street, San Francisco, California
Cafe Nefeli	1854 Euclid Street, Berkeley, California
Cafe Milano	2522 Bancroft Way, Berkeley, California
Espresso Roma	2960 College Avenue, Berkeley, California
Coffee Source	2404 Telegraph Berkeley Street, Berkeley, California
Caffe Mediterraneum	2475 Telegraph Avenue, Berkeley, California
Gaylord Cafe	4123 Piedmont Avenue, Oakland, California
Central Park Books	32 E. Fourth Street, San Mateo, California
Royal Ground	1146 4th Street, San Rafael, California
Caffe Nuvo	556 San Anselmo Avenue, San Anselmo, California
Mama's Royal Cafe	387 Miller Avenue, Mill Valley, California
Java Beach	1396 La Playa St, San Francisco, California

SF Net discontinued service in August 1997.

== See also ==
- Community Memory, a public access system similar to SF Net
- The First Social Network, Wayne's first-hand account of the history of SF Net and himself
