= Icy Tower =

Platform video game

- Developer: Free Lunch Design
- Designer: Johan Peitz
- Artists: Johan Peitz, Emanuel Garnheim (Note: As the person responsible for the renewal of the game graphics in Icy Tower 1.4.)
- Composer: Anders Svensson
- Engine: Allegro
- Platforms: Windows, Mac OS X
- Release: EU: 2001-12-22
- Genre: Platform
- Mode: Single-player

Icy Tower is a freeware video game by Swedish game developer Free Lunch Design. It is a platform game set in a tower, where the player's goal is to jump from one "floor" to the next and go as high as possible without falling and plunging off the screen. The higher the player's character climbs, the faster the tower's floors move downward and the harder the game becomes. By default, the player controls the character using a keyboard.

== Gameplay ==
A screenshot of Icy Tower 1.4

The player starts the game on the tower's first floor. To climb the tower, the player must jump from floor to floor (default control: space bar). The character can pass through the floors from below, but lands on them when falling from above. Once the player has landed on a floor, they can move across its surface using the arrow keys. By moving across the floor, the player builds momentum for the next jump. The character can also bounce off the vertical walls on the left and right edges of the tower, allowing them to switch direction while maintaining momentum.

If a player builds enough momentum, they can climb several floors in a single jump. Extended sequences of such multi-floor jumps are referred to as combos. A combo ends when a player makes a jump which covers only one floor, falls off a floor and lands on a lower floor, or fails to make a jump within a certain time frame (about 3 seconds).

At the start of the game, the tower's floors are stationary. When the player reaches floor 5, the floors begin to move slowly downward. Every thirty seconds, the floors' downward speed increases and the game tells the player to "Hurry up!" If the player misses a floor and falls off the bottom of the screen, the game ends. It also ends if the player is standing on a floor that moves off the bottom of the screen.

The goal is to reach the highest possible floor and accumulate the greatest number of points. Points are awarded based on the highest floor reached and the player's combos (if any).

Because the tower is of infinite height, it is impossible to reach the top floor. When the game ends, a replay of the game may be saved for later viewing.

=== Floors ===
The horizontal length of each floor depends on the player's progress, the version of the game, and a random factor. The floors' appearances change every 100 floors until floor 1000.

- Floors 0–99: Stone
- Floors 100–199: Ice
- Floors 200–299: Wood
- Floors 300–399: Metal
- Floors 400–499: Chewing gum
- Floors 500–599: Bone
- Floors 600–699: Vines
- Floors 700–799: Pipe
- Floors 800–899: Cloud
- Floors 900–999: Rainbow
- Floors 1,000 and above: Glass

=== High scores ===
Icy Tower records players' best results in built-in high-score tables. Scores are recorded in several categories including highest score, highest floor and longest combo. Players may also publish their scores in online high score lists which may require players to provide game replays to verify their results. The official Icy Tower list is on Free Lunch Design's web server.

== Development ==
Free Lunch Design created Icy Tower using the C programming language and the Allegro game library. Its designers were inspired by Xjump, a game for the Linux operating system.

=== Ports ===
Icy Tower Mobile (Note: The game is also known as Icy Tower ME (ITME).)
- Developer: Xendex Entertainment
- Publisher: Hands–On Mobile
- Designer: Johan Peitz (Note: As the designer and artist of Icy Tower in the version for personal computers.)
- Platform: Java ME
- Release: EU: 2008-10-06
- Genres: action game, platform game
- Mode: single-player

Icy Tower Facebook
- Developer: Free Lunch Design (Muskedunder Interactive (Note: A Swedish game developer that owned Free Lunch Design as of March 2008. "What's new". Muskedunder Interactive. "The Swedish flash game developer Muskedunder Interactive today [i.e. March 30, 2008] announced it has acquired the independent game developer Free Lunch Design."))
- Designer: Johan Peitz
- Platforms: Adobe Flash, Facebook Platform
- Release: EU: 2009-09-24; (Note: The version of Icy Tower Facebook released on September 24, 2009 was a beta release. As of 2009, no final version of ITFB has been released.)
- Genres: action game, platform game
- Mode: single-player

Icy Tower iPhone
- Designer: Johan Peitz
- Release: EU: 2010-11-12
- Genres: action game, platform game
- Mode: single-player

Icy Tower Classic
- Developer: Free Lunch Design
- Publisher: Free Lunch Design
- Designer: Johan Peitz
- Platforms: Google Play Store, App Store, Mac App Store
- Release: EU: 2013-5-28
- Genres: action game, platform game
- Mode: single-player

Icy Tower Retro
- Developer: Free Lunch Design
- Publisher: Free Lunch Design
- Designer: Johan Peitz
- Platform: Google Play Store (Palringo)
- Release: EU: Unknown
- Genres: action game, platform game
- Mode: single-player

Icy Tower Jump
- Developer: Free Lunch Design
- Publisher: Free Lunch Design
- Designer: Johan Peitz
- Platform: Nokia
- Release: EU: Unknown
- Genres: action game, platform game
- Mode: single-player

On 14 March 2007, a press release was published on the Free Lunch Design website announcing a partnership between FLD and mobile game developer Xendex Entertainment for the porting of Icy Tower to the mobile environment. Icy Tower Mobile (ITM) was released on 6 October 2008. Due to the then-current limitations of mobile platforms, the game lacked several features in its PC counterpart, such as recording or sharing replays, and changing game characters.

On 24 September 2009, a Free Lunch Design game named Icy Tower Facebook (ITFB), developed on the Adobe Flash platform within the development framework of the Facebook social networking website, was released. It allows players to compare their results with results of their friends within the Facebook system. Players can also personalise their in-game avatars and unlock additional game levels (so-called towers) corresponding to various game styles in the PC version of Icy Tower by exchanging them for coins, the game's virtual currency.

In November 2012, an official continuation of Icy Tower, Icy Tower 2, was released for iOS and Android. The producer estimates that on 23 November, the number of downloads of Icy Tower 2 downloads surpassed one million. There are also unofficial, player-developed Icy Tower ports for the Nintendo DS and PlayStation Portable game consoles.

== Reception ==
Icy Tower ranked high in the "Most Popular" ranking of the "PC games" section in the Download.com software directory website; its average monthly number of downloads was "more than 20,000" in 2006, amounting to over five million as of 2009. The total number of Icy Tower downloads was estimated at over 11 million in 2008. In terms of the number of websites devoted to the game, it is most popular in Czech Republic, Germany and Poland. Central European countries are also home to a major portion of top Icy Tower players. According to Johan Peitz, the author of the game, the reason behind the popularity of Icy Tower is that it allows players to compete in several different categories, for example in striving for both high floors and high scores.

Online Icy Tower communities allow their members to exchange high scores, replays and comments about the game and its gameplay. Additionally, players frequently compete against themselves in online competitions. Icy Tower tournaments usually consist of a number of rounds, each lasting one or more days. In every round, contestants are required to record one or more replays with a result in a specific category of the game. Players have also organized live meetings, which took place in Cracow and Warsaw, Poland and Prague, Czech Republic.

On 30 May 2007, an official Icy Tower website operated by Free Lunch Design was launched, available at icytower.freelunchdesign.com. (Note: The site has subsequently been relocated to itc.freelunchdesign.com.) On 3 June 2009, the day of Icy Tower 1.4 release, an additional, complementary site has been opened at icytower.com.

=== Add-ons ===
The internal structure of Icy Tower allows for making changes to the character, soundtrack, sound effects, and game palette through downloading and installation of repackaged resource files. (Note: Since Icy Tower 1.4 it is no longer possible to change the game palette using a custom character.)

Since version 1.2, Icy Tower allows for the use of skins to create additional custom characters which can replace the three default characters provided in the game package. Making a new character is done by creating an image file of a specified structure, containing the various poses needed to animate the character. It is also possible to create a more complex add-on using WAV sound files, which will modify the game's soundtrack and sound effects.

=== Tools ===
There are a number of tools to help players train, change the game physics, or analyze their own results.
