= Generation Z in the United States =

American generation born from 1997 to 2012

Generation Z (or Gen Z for short), colloquially known as Zoomers, is the demographic cohort succeeding Millennials and preceding Generation Alpha.

Members of Generation Z, were born between the mid-to-late 1990s and the early 2010s, with the generation typically being defined as those born from 1997 to 2012. In other words, the first wave came of age during the latter half of the second decade of the twenty-first century, a time of significant demographic change due to declining birthrates, population aging, and immigration. Americans who grew up in the 2000s and 2010s saw gains in IQ points, but loss in creativity. They also reach puberty earlier than previous generations.

On the whole, they are financially cautious, and are increasingly interested in alternatives to attending institutions of higher education, with young men being primarily responsible for the trend.

They became familiar with the Internet and portable digital devices at a young age (as "digital natives"), but are not necessarily digitally literate, and tend to struggle in a digital work place. The majority use at least one social-media platform, leading to concerns that spending so much time on social media can distort their view of the world, hamper their social development, harm their mental health, expose them to inappropriate materials, and cause them to become addicted. Although they trust traditional news media more than what they see online, they tend to be more skeptical of the news than their parents.

While a majority of young Americans of the late 2010s held politically left-leaning views, Generation Z has been shifting towards the right since 2020. Most members of Generation Z are more interested in advancing their careers than pursuing idealistic political causes. There is a significant sex gap, with implications for families, politics, and society at large. As voters, members Generation Z do not align themselves closely with either major political parties; their top issue is the economy. As consumers, Generation Z's actual purchases do not reflect their environmental ideals. Members of Generation Z, especially women, are less likely to be religious than older cohorts.

Although American youth culture has become highly fragmented by the start of the early twenty-first century, a product of growing individualism, nostalgia is a major feature of youth culture in the 2010s and 2020s.

== Nomenclature and date range ==
While there is no scientific process for deciding when a name has stuck, the momentum is clearly behind Gen Z.

— Michael Dimmock, Pew Research Center (2019)

The name Generation Z is a reference to the fact that it follows Generation Y (Millennials). Other proposed names for the generation include iGeneration, Homeland Generation, Net Gen, Digital Natives, Neo-Digital Natives, Pluralist Generation, Centennials, and Post-Millennials. The term Internet Generation reflect that the generation is the first to have been born after the mass-adoption of the Internet.

In the U.S., the term Generation Z is overwhelmingly the most popular. Zoomer is an informal term often used in an ironic, humorous, or ridiculing tone. It combines the term boomer, referring to baby boomers, with the "Z" from Generation Z. Prior to this, Zoomer was used in the 2000s to describe particularly active baby boomers. Zoomer in its current incarnation skyrocketed in popularity in 2018, when it was used in an Internet meme ridiculing Gen Z adolescents. Merriam-Webster's records suggest the use of the term zoomer in the sense of Generation Z dates back at least as far as 2016. It was added to the dictionary in 2021.

In January 2019, Pew Research Center defined "Post-Millennials" as people born from 1997 onward, choosing this date for "different formative experiences" for the purposes of demographic analysis. Common generational experiences include technological developments and socioeconomic trends, including the widespread availability of wireless internet access and high-bandwidth cellular service, and key world events, such as growing up in a world after the September 11th terrorist attacks. During a 2019 analysis, Pew stated that they have yet to set an endpoint to Generation Z, but did use the year 2012 to complete their analysis. Jason Dorsey of the Center for Generational Kinetics also cites Pew Research's 1997–2012 range to define Gen Z in a 2025 article.

In a 2022 article, U.S. Census economists Neil Bennett and Briana Sullivan described Generation Z as those born 1997 to 2013. Psychologists Jean Twenge and Jonathan Haidt argue that even though the concept of a social generation remains debated, there is evidence for significant differences between the different demographic cohorts. Those born between (on the cusp of) the Millennial generation and Generation Z are commonly known as Zillennials. Those born (on the cusp of) Generation Z and Generation Alpha are commonly known as Zalphas.

== Arts and culture ==
=== General trends ===
Two young speakers at a 9/11 remembrance event in New York City in 2023. Generation Z has no memories of the attacks but is still affected by them.

Given their birth years, members of Generation Z have no memory of the time before the terrorist attacks on September 11, 2001, and the subsequent war on terror. But they do vividly remember when they first learned as schoolchildren what had transpired. Even twenty years after the attacks had taken place, concerns over national security as well as personal safety remain.

Most members of Generation Z, however, were in their formative years during the 2008 financial crisis. In 2013, 47% of Generation Z in the United States (considered here to be those between the ages of 14 and 23) were concerned about student debt, while 36% were worried about being able to afford a higher education at all. This generation is facing a growing income gap and a shrinking middle-class, which all have led to increasing stress levels in families. According to Public Relations Society of America, the Great Recession has taught Generation Z to be independent, and has led to an entrepreneurial desire, after seeing their parents and older siblings struggle in the workforce. Psychologist Jean Twenge describes Generation Z as "uniquely pessimistic" compared to older cohorts.

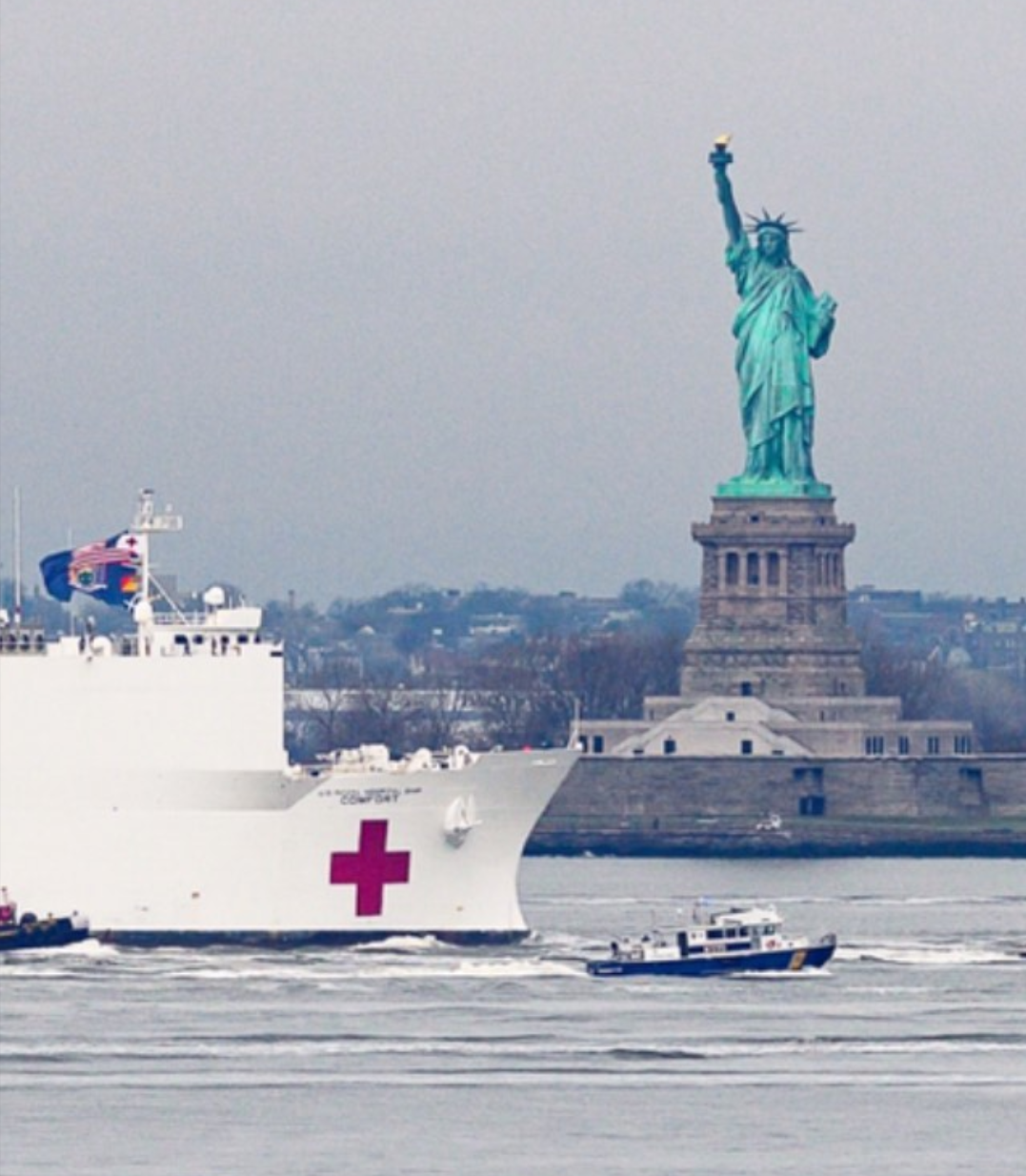
Hospital ship USNS Comfort entering New York Harbor in March 2020 in response to the COVID-19 pandemic, a major global crisis that took place during the formative years of Generation Z

The COVID-19 pandemic struck when the oldest members of Generation Z was just joining the workforce and the rest were still in school. For this reason, it split Generation Z into two small cohorts with drastically different lived experiences, and this gap has been widened by the rapid pace of technological change, not just video-sharing platforms—especially TikTok—but also generative artificial intelligence (AI) algorithms, notably ChatGPT. Consequently, the two sub-groups of Generation Z not only have different worldviews in general but also different politics.

Generation Z has shown interest in nostalgia, things that remind them of their childhood, and even of eras before they were born. As a result, they adapt and modernize cultural artifacts in efforts to connect to the past, but without abandoning modern electronic devices, which enable them to experience the idealized past .

Jean Twenge describes Generation Z as "slow life-history strategists"—meaning they delay taking part in adult activities such as drinking alcohol, having sexual intercourse, or driving, as a consequence of their upbringing. Interest in sports has also declined noticeably compared to older generations.

A 2014 study Generation Z Goes to College found that Generation Z students self-identify as being loyal, compassionate, thoughtful, open-minded, responsible, and determined. How they see their Generation Z peers is quite different from their own self-identity. They view their peers as competitive, spontaneous, adventuresome, and curious—all characteristics that they do not see readily in themselves. Like all other cohorts born after the Second World War, Generation Z is culturally individualistic and values social equality. But unlike older living generations of their time, members of Generation Z are much more likely to identify as gay, lesbian, bisexual, transgender, or otherwise non-conforming.

Museums from across the United States significantly expanded their programs aimed at children, including K-12 students, during the 2000s and 2010s, according to the American Alliance of Museums and the Institute of Museum and Library Services.

=== News media ===
According to the Reuters Institute for the Study of Journalism, among Americans in their late teens and early 20s, the most common sources of news were social media (especially Facebook and YouTube). Even so, they turn towards well-known news outlets to learn more about current events that interest them. A 2019 survey by Barnes and Nobles Education found that The New York Times, The Washington Post, The Wall Street Journal, CNN, and the USA Today are deemed the most trustworthy news sources by Generation Z. They also found that Generation Z consider traditional print media to be the most trustworthy while word of mouth and what they see on social media to be the least trustworthy.

While Generation Z understands the importance of traditional news agencies, they tend to be less loyal than their parents. Young Americans are concerned about the perceived bias, lack of context, negativity, and sensationalism in the news media. American youths today want news stories that are not only fun and meaningful but also accurate and fair. A 2016 poll by Gallup found a decline in trust in the news media across all age groups since (at least) the 1990s, and people aged 18 to 49 are less likely than those 50 years of age or older to trust the media.

While visual story-telling has proven to be popular, 58% of Generation Z still prefer text to videos. This number goes up for people who are older. When asked what they would choose if they could have only one subscription, only 7% picked the news while 37% chose a video service and 15% selected music.

=== Entertainment ===
The most popular forms of entertainment among Generation Z are playing video games, listening to music, surfing the Internet, and using social media networks. According to Asha Choksi, vice president of global research and insights for the educational publisher Pearson, about one in every three members of Generation Z spends at least four hours per day watching videos online. Data from the Bureau of Labor Statistics show that while people aged 15 to 24 spent more time playing video games in 2018, the time spent on computers and televisions remained virtually unchanged.

==== Music ====
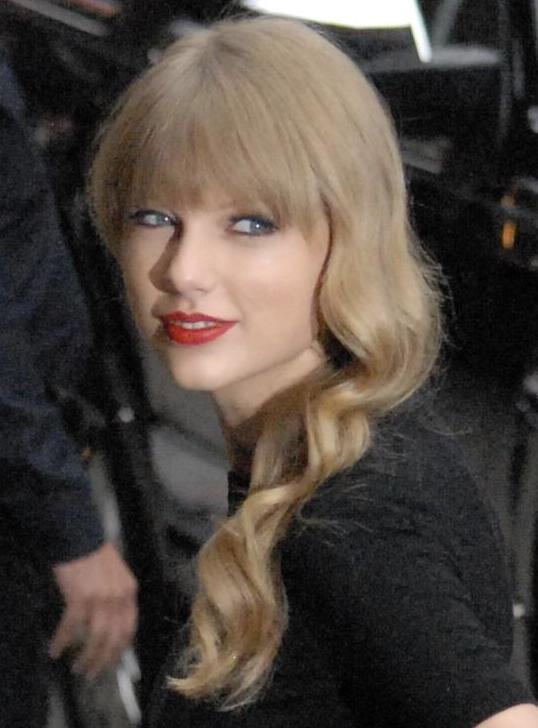
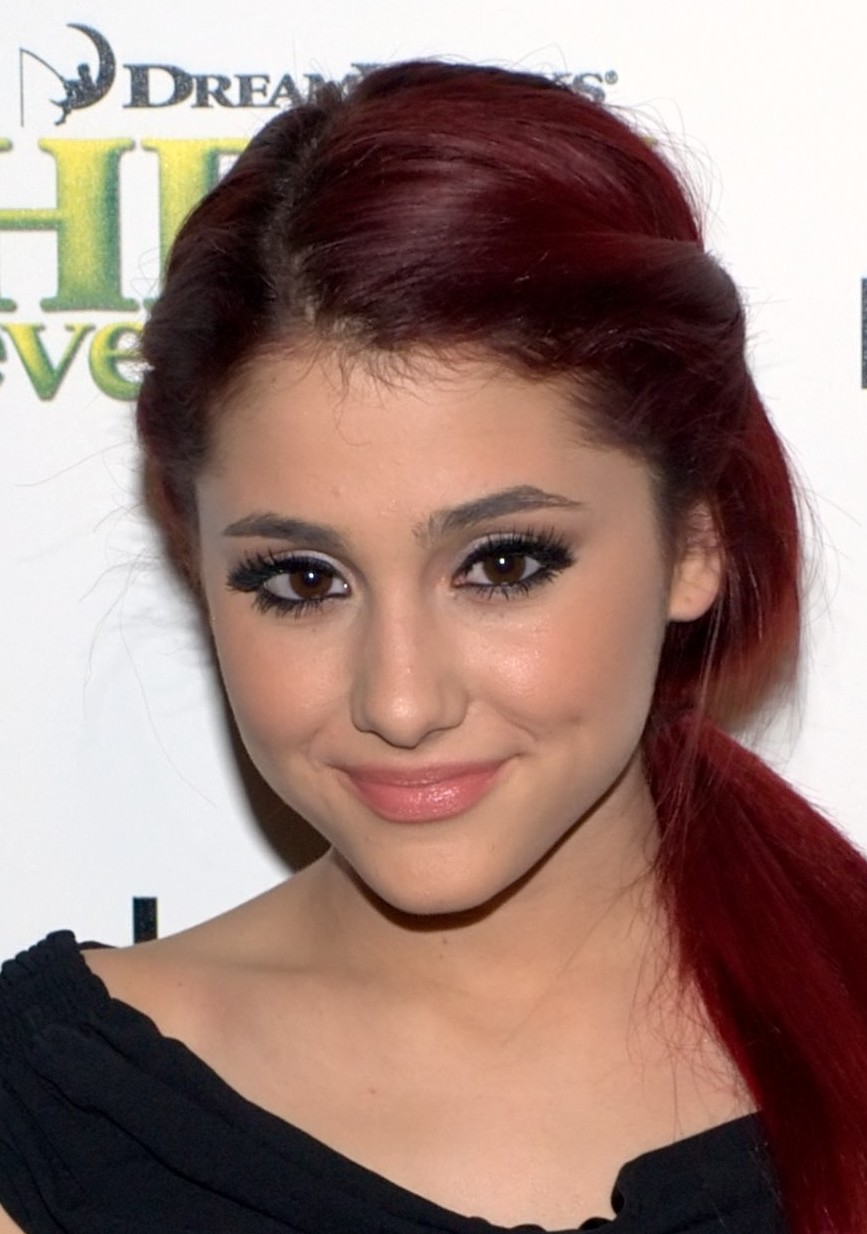
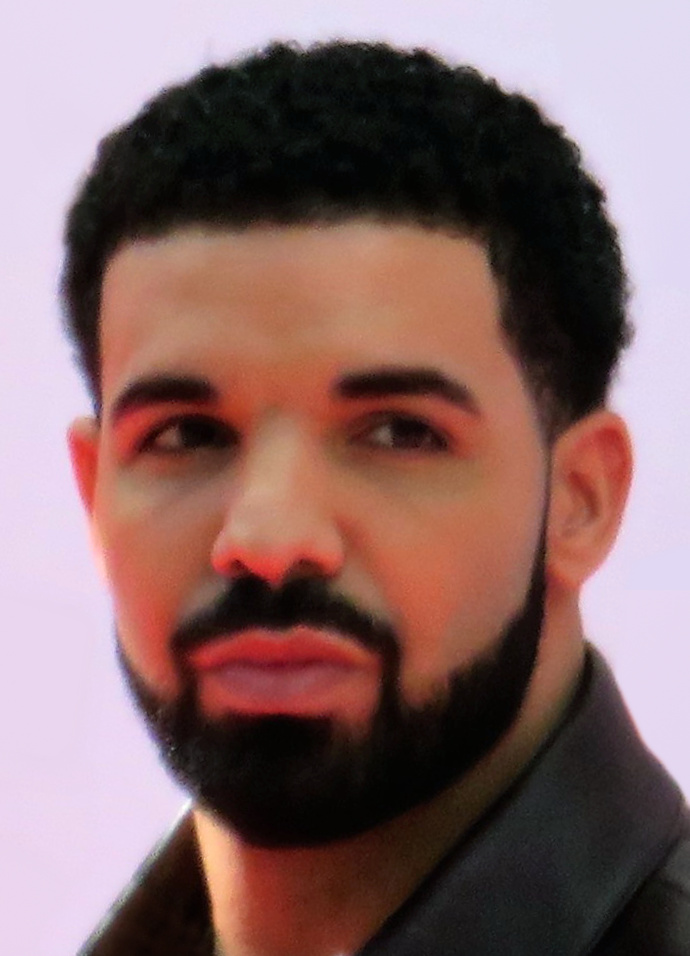
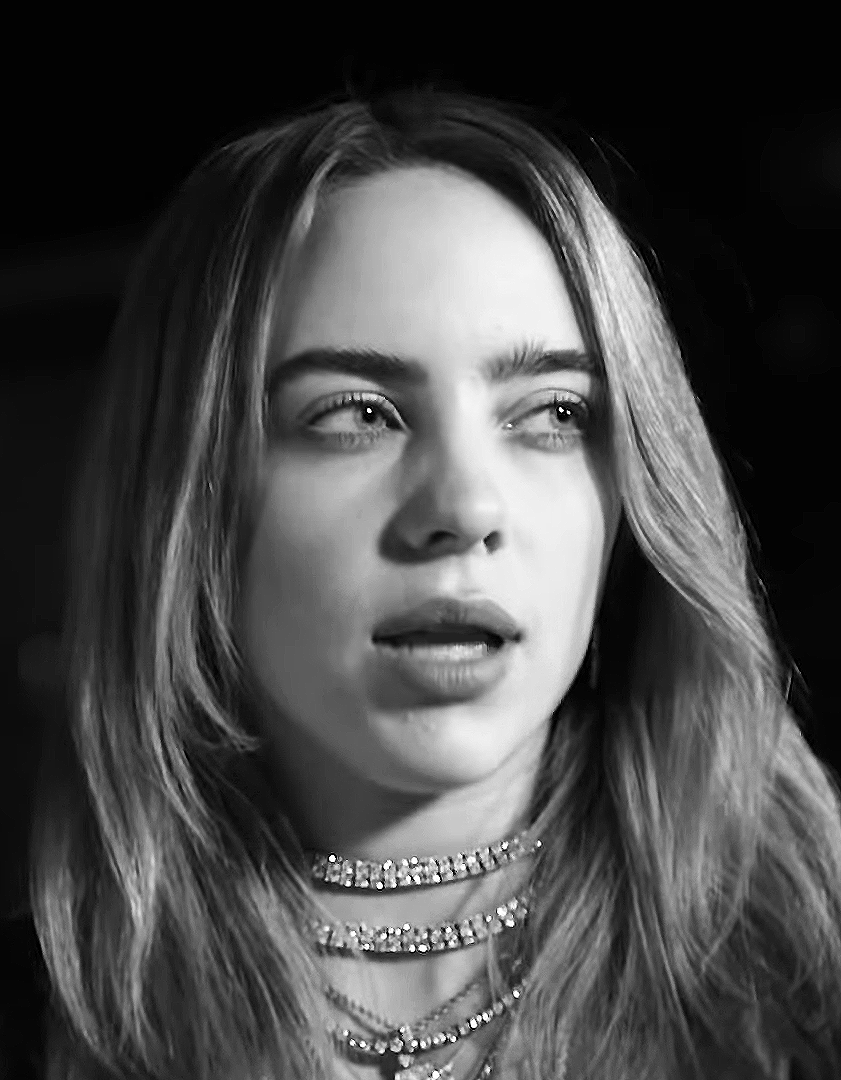
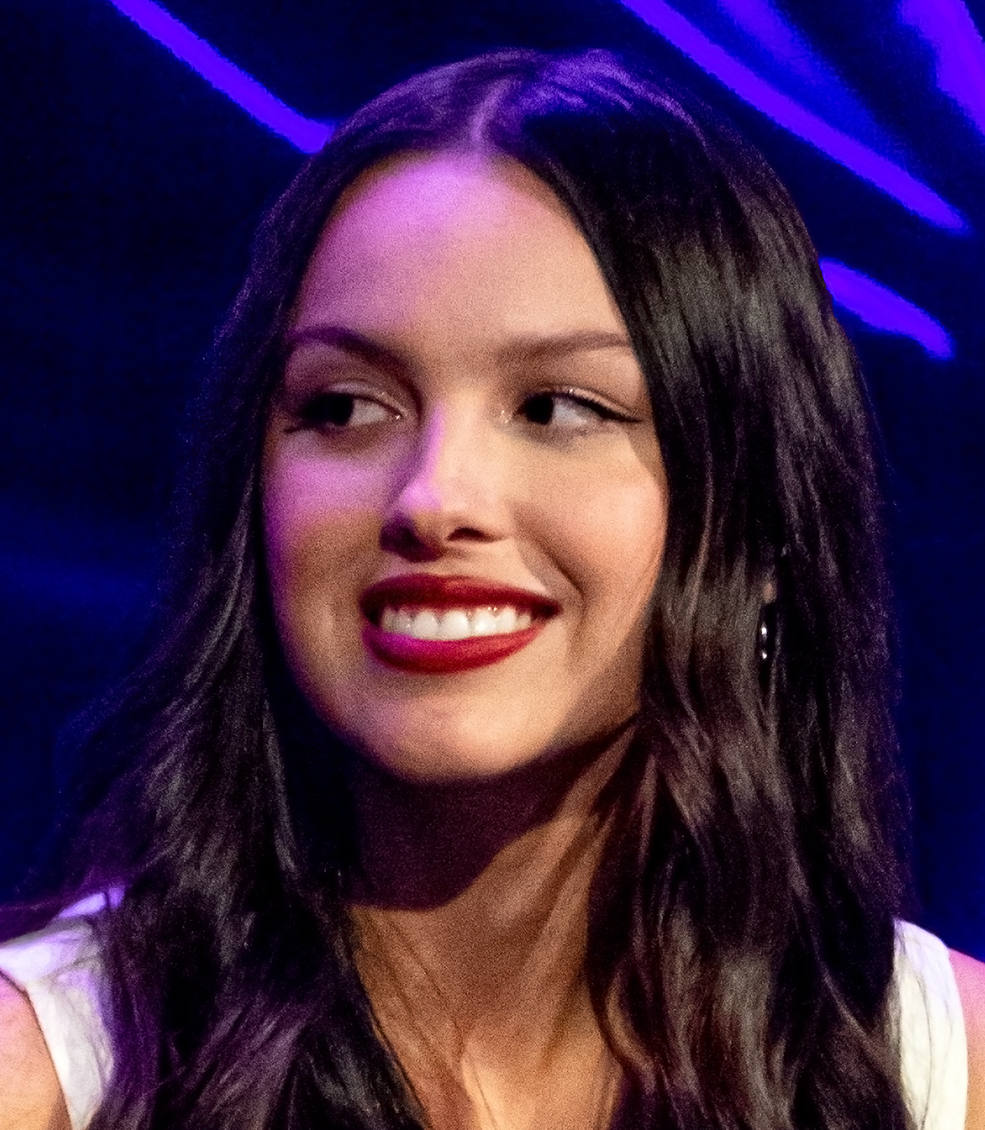
(From left to right) Taylor Swift, Ariana Grande, Drake, Billie Eilish, and Olivia Rodrigo are some of the most popular musicians among Generation Z.

In its 2018 Gen Z Music Consumption & Spending Report, digital media company Sweety High found that Generation Z was listening to more diverse music genres than generations past, whose music preferences solidified by early adolescence. Spotify was the most popular source of music for Generation Z (61%), followed by terrestrial radio ranked second (55%), while YouTube was the preferred platform for music discovery (75%). TikTok is another major platform for music discovery and for Generation Z to connect with their favorite musicians.

Research on popular music from the 1950s to the 2010s has shown that this genre has become louder, while the chords, melodies, and types of sounds used have becoming increasingly homogenized. At the same time, lyrics of the most popular songs have becoming less joyful, sadder, and angrier. Such shifts have occurred due to changing consumer tastes. In particular, the melancholic lyrics of Billie Eilish and Olivia Rodrigo resonate with their generation. A 2019 poll by Ypulse found that for teenagers (13 to 18), the top musicians were Billie Eilish and Ariana Grande. Among young adults (19 to 26), the most liked were Taylor Swift and Ariana Grande.

Chinese music video app Musical.ly was highly popular among American teens. In 2018, Musical.ly was shut down and its users were transferred to TikTok. By the early 2020s, TikTok has become one of the most popular social networks among teenagers and young adults in the United States.

==== Film and television ====
Cartoon Network, the Disney Channel, and Nickelodeon were once staples of children's entertainment among Millennials and Generation Z. But viewership began to drop in the early 2010s. Nielsen figures for 2020 revealed that the viewership of children's cable linear television channels continued their steady decline despite the COVID-19 pandemic, which forced many parents and their children to stay at home, while streaming services saw healthy growth. Among members of Generation Z who regularly watch movies, demand for physical media (DVDs and Blu-rays), both for sale and for rent, has been climbing in the 2020s.

Animations, including those made in Japan (known as anime), are in high demand among Generation Z. By the mid-2020s, the most popular television series among Generation Z include My Hero Academia (2016–present), Steven Universe (2013–2019), Invincible (2021–present), Euphoria (2019–2026), Star Wars: The Clone Wars (2008–2020), and Loki (2021–2023). Generations Z and Alpha also enjoy comfort television shows popular with older cohorts or ended before they were born, such as Friends (1994–2004) and Gilmore Girls (2000–2007; 2016), and shows featuring characters roughly their age, like Young Sheldon (2017–2024) and Stranger Things (2016–2025), and long-running television drama, like Grey's Anatomy (2005–present).

The Netflix science-fiction horror series Stranger Things became a popular TV series to Generation Z by using and evoking nostalgia for the 1980s. A slight majority of Generation Z would like to see fewer instances of romance and sex in the movies and television programs they watch, and more of friendships, platonic love, and other types of relationships, including opposite-sex friendships that do not evolve into romantic or sexual relationships. Pluralities of this cohort also want to see more aromantic or asexual characters.

Even so, certain television series such as The Sex Lives of College Girls (2021–2025) and movies like Poor Things (2023) have proven to be popular among younger audiences. A slight majority of Generation Z prefers films and movies with original plots to adaptations, franchises, and remakes. In particular, they would like more contents that are authentic and reflect their own lives.

As members of Generation Z re-watch their favorite childhood films, some have become cult classics for their cohorts, including Charlie and the Chocolate Factory (2005), Star Wars: Episode III – Revenge of the Sith (2005), and Aquamarine (2006). By the mid-2020s, Generation Z has become a key demographic group for movie theaters. As they grow older, members of Generation Z still broadly prefer family-friendly movies, such as the Disney film Lilo & Stitch (2025), and the summer blockbuster Spider-Man: Brand New Day (2026). The animated series Bluey (2018–present), despite being made for preschool children, has captured the imagination of many Millennials and members of Generation Z. Not only does it fuel their nostalgia and portrays family life optimistically, but also helps them recover from childhood emotional wounds.

==== Reading ====
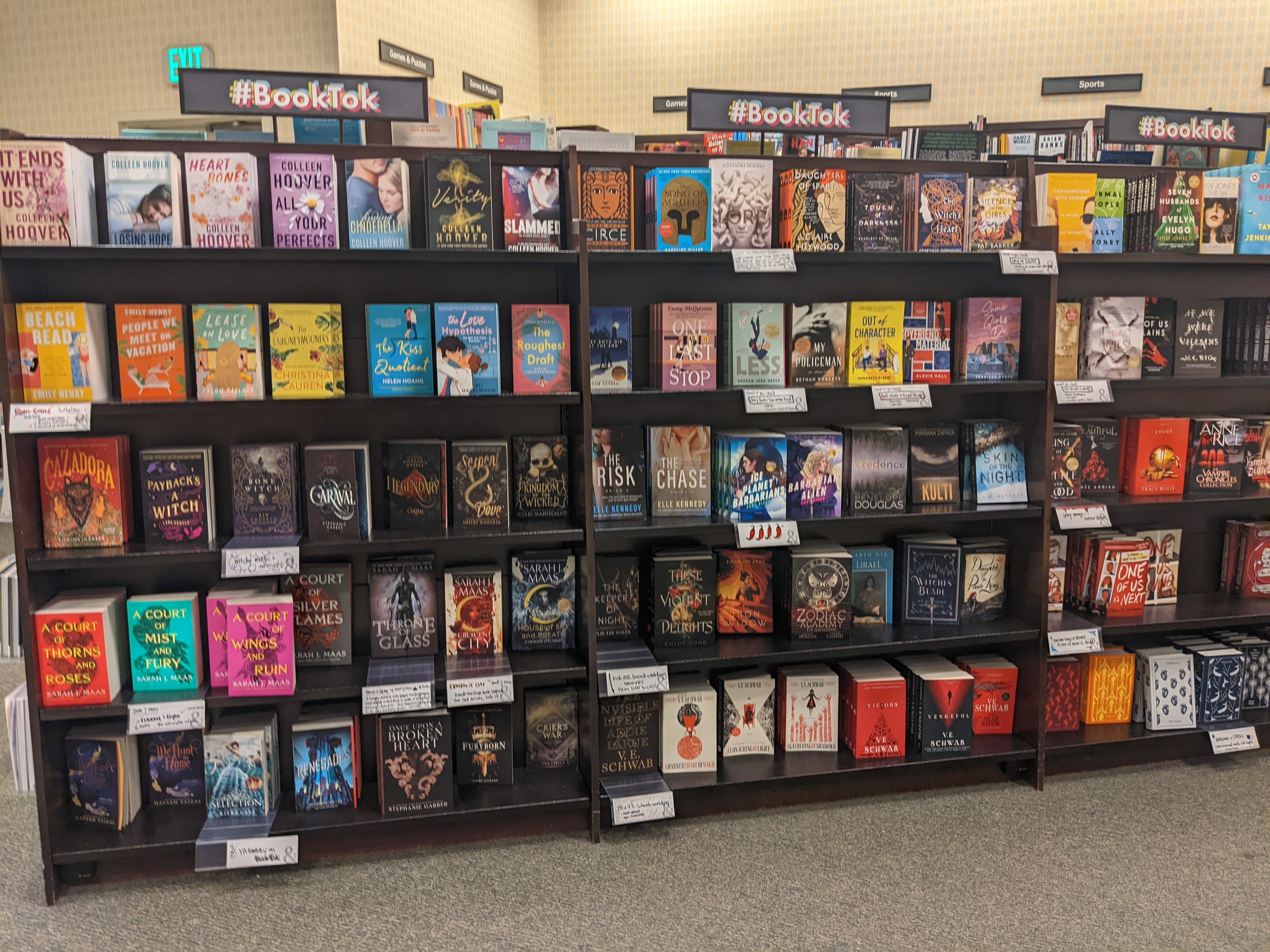
The BookTok section at a Barnes & Noble store in Los Angeles (2022). BookTok has led to a surge in volitional reading among Generation Z.

A longitudinal analysis from 1976 to 2016 concluded that "compared with previous generations, teens in the 2010s spent more time online and less time with traditional media, such as books, magazines and television. Time on digital media has displaced time once spent enjoying a book or watching TV." Between 2006 and 2016, usage of digital media, including social networking websites, increased among teenagers while the number of teenagers who read books in their spare time dropped.

At school, teachers assign much shorter reading assignments than in the past, and they are less likely to require that students read full-length books. But among teenagers who read for pleasure, dystopian fiction, such as The Hunger Games and Divergent, has proven to be popular. The surge in reading during the 2000s coincided with the release of the Harry Potter and Twilight novels. Millennial and Gen-Z readers mostly prefer print books to electronic ones. They also tend to like comic books, manga, and graphic novels more than text-only versions of the same stories.

Many members of Generation Z have joined BookTok, a community started on TikTok where people share and discuss the books they read. Among Gen Z, BookTok seems to have boosted reading for pleasure. Many members of Generation Z who do not consider themselves readers still visit public libraries for social events, classes, or a sense of community.

== Demographics ==
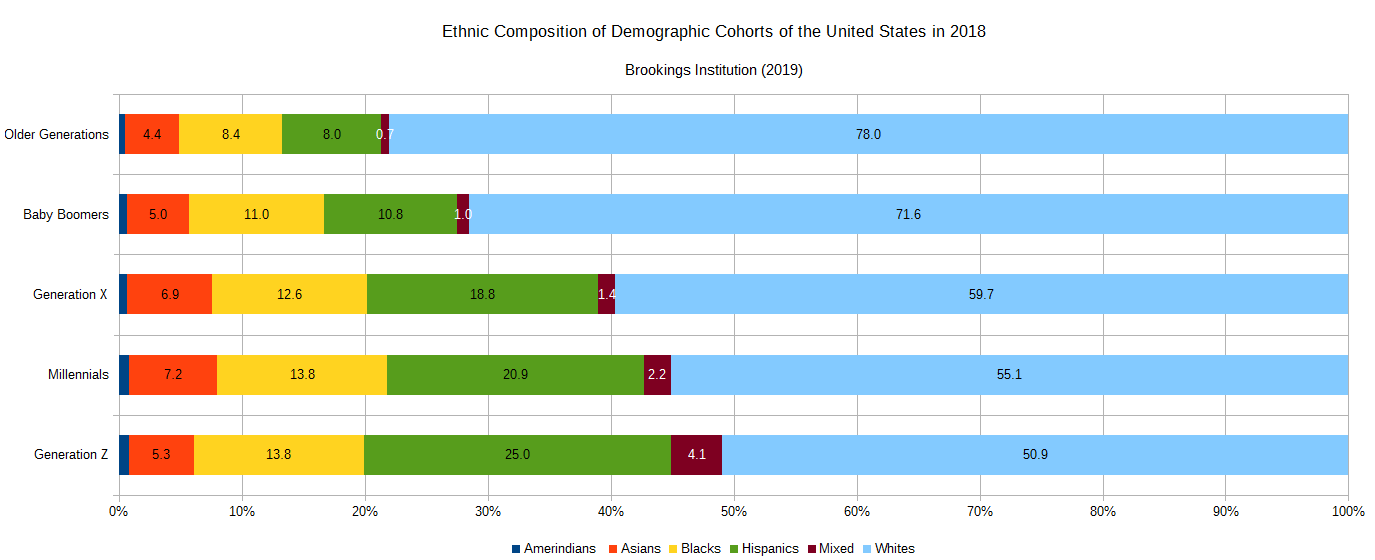

A report by demographer William Frey suggests that as of 2019, 50.9% of Generation Z is white, 13.8% is black, 25.0% Hispanic, and 5.3% Asian. 29% of Generation Z are children of immigrants or immigrants themselves, compared to 23% of Millennials when they were at the same age. As of 2019, 13.7% of the U.S. population is foreign-born, compared to 9.7% in 1997, when the first members of Generation Z had their birth cries.

In 2019, in spite of the diminished flow of immigrants to the United States following the Great Recession, Generation Z was the most ethnically diverse yet seen. 52% of this generation is white. In 2019, 25% were Hispanic. 14% were black, and 4% were Asian. In 2018, approximately 4% were multiracial, and this number has risen rapidly between 2000 and 2010. In 2015, the number of Americans who identify as mixed white and black has grown by 134% while whites and Asians increased by 87%. In 2019, 44% of Millennials, 40% of Generation X, and 28% of the Baby Boomers identified as non-white. 2019 research by the demographer Bill Frey suggests that at the national level, Hispanics and Asians are the fastest-growing racial minority groups in the United States while the number of Caucasians under the age of 18 has been declining since 2000.

The number of births to Caucasian women in the United States dropped 7% between 2000 and 2018. Among foreign-born Caucasian women, the number of births increased by 1% in the same period. The number of births to foreign-born Hispanic women fell from 58% in 2000 to 50% in 2018. The share of births to U.S.-born Hispanic women increased from 20% in 2000 to 24% in 2018. Births to foreign-born Asian women rose from 19% in 2000 to 24% in 2018. Births to U.S.-born Asian women went from 1% in 2000 to 2% in 2018. Between 2000 and 2017, there were more births were to foreign-born women, than U.S.-born women.

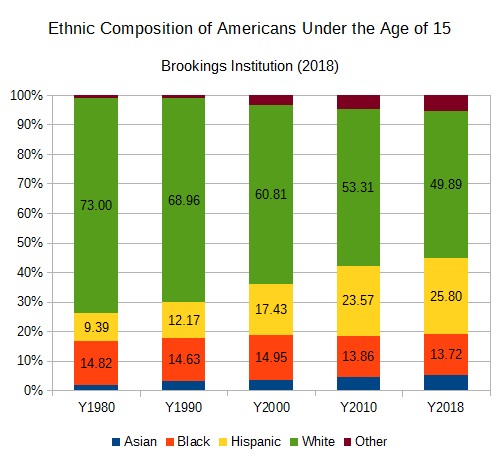
Ethnic minorities under the age of 15 have seen significant growth since the 2000s.

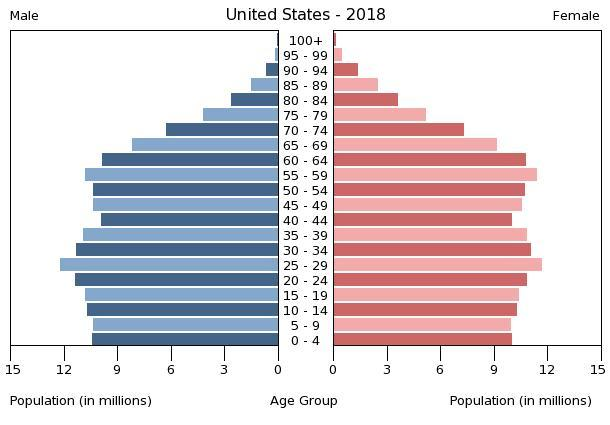
Population pyramid of the United States in 2018

Members of Generation Z are slightly less likely to be foreign-born than Millennials; the fact that more American Latinos are born in the U.S. rather than abroad plays a role in making the first wave of Generation Z appear better educated than their predecessors. However, researchers note that this trend could be altered by changing immigration patterns and the younger members of Generation Z choosing alternate educational paths. (Note: See the section on post-secondary education.) 29% of Generation Z are children of immigrants or immigrants themselves, compared to 23% of Millennials when they were at the same age. As of 2019, 13.7% of the U.S. population is foreign-born, compared to 9.7% in 1997, when the first members of Generation Z had their birth cries. For this cohort, the number of people born in the United States reached a peak of 4.3 million in 2007.

Not only are Americans becoming more and more racially diverse, but racial minorities are also becoming more geographically dispersed than ever before, as new immigrants settle in places other than the large metropolitan areas historically populated by migrants, such as New York City, Los Angeles, and San Francisco. A majority of Generation Z live in urban areas and are less inclined to change address than their predecessors. Similar to the Millennials, roughly two thirds of Generation Z come from households of married parents. By contrast, this living arrangement was essentially the norm for Generation X and the Baby Boomers, at 73% and 85%, respectively.

As a demographic cohort, Generation Z is smaller than the Baby Boomers or their children, the Millennials. (See population pyramid.) According to the U.S. Census Bureau, Generation Z makes up about one quarter of the U.S. population. This demographic change could have social, cultural, and political implications for the decades ahead. Generation Z are usually the children of Generation X and Millennials. Jason Dorsey, who works for the Center of Generational Kinetics, observed that Generation Z is not an extreme version of the Millennials but is rather different, and the differences can largely be attributed to parenting. Like parents from Generation X, members of Generation Z tend to be autonomous and pessimistic. They need validation less than the Millennials and typically become financially literate at an earlier age as many of their parents bore the full brunt of the Great Recession.

== Economic trends and outlooks ==
=== Spending and savings habits ===
==== Consumer behavior ====
Modern technology has enabled Generation Z to take advantage of the on-demand economy, defined as "the economic activity created by technology companies that fulfill consumer demand via the immediate provisioning of goods and service." Generation Z tends to value utility and quality over brand name. Authenticity is critical. Having been raised by Generation X and grown up in a recession, members of Generation Z are quick to verify claims. Being consistent users of the Internet and social media, they frequently employ these tools to learn more about a certain product or service they are interested in. Product specifications, vendor ratings, and peer reviews are all important. They tend to be skeptical and will shun firms whose actions and values are contradictory. There is a fair amount of interest in in-person shopping rather than over the Internet, a potentially positive development for brick-and-mortar stores. Products with comprehensible ingredients and simple packaging are preferred. In recognition of the tastes of large segments of Generation Z, the next cohort of young consumers, a number of brands, such as M&M's, have moved their advertising and mascots away from the sexual appeal and towards a more anxious but casual style. Generation Z's shopping habits are affected by social media networks and their impact on mental health. Gen-Z consumers are less likely to pay a premium for what they want compared to their counterparts from emerging economies. While majorities might signal their support for certain ideals such as "environmental consciousness" to pollsters, actual purchases do not reflect their stated views, as can be seen from their high demand for cheap but not durable clothing ("fast fashion"), or preference for rapid delivery. Overall, although more than half say they sought environmentally friendly products, only 38% are willing to pay extra for them. While majorities of older cohorts prefer American products, Generation Z is mixed on whether or not to buy goods made in China.

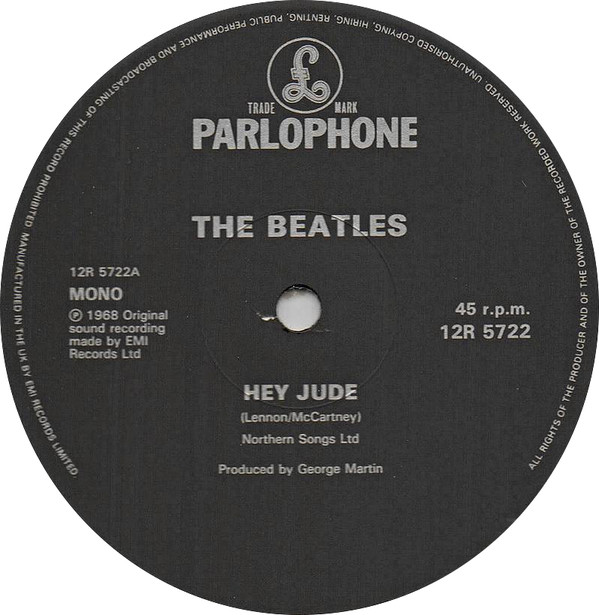
Young people are nostalgically preserving vinyl records, among other items of the past.

Nostalgia is a major theme of the behavior of consumers from Generation Z. For example, 2000s vintage electronics and fashion are back in vogue by the early 2020s. Youths who came of age during the 2010s and 2020s feel nostalgic about "simpler" eras of history they have never experienced due to the uncertainties and stress of modern life, with student loan debts and the threat of terrorism being the top concerns. Despite having the reputation for "killing" many things valued by older generations, Millennials and Generation Z are nostalgically preserving Polaroid cameras, vinyl records, needlepoint, and home gardening, to name just some. In fact, while "dumb phones" (or feature phones rather than smartphones) are on the decline around the world, in the U.S., their sales are growing among Generation Z. According to a 2019 YouGov poll, 31% of the U.S. population is willing to pay for music on vinyl, including 26% of Generation Z. As a matter of fact, Millennials and Generation Z have given life to nostalgia as an industry in the late 2010s and early 2020s, a trend that coincides with the resurgence of some cultural phenomena of the late 1990s and early 2000s (Y2K), such the television series Friends (1994–2004), something that is well-received among young people despite its age. Nostalgia has also contributed to the anticipation and subsequent commercial success of the summer film Barbie (2023) based on a well-known doll of the same name, even though it was intended for adults rather than children.

Millennials and Generation Z on average begin using cosmetics in their mid-teens, or a few years earlier than the Baby Boomers and Generation X.

==== Food and drinks ====
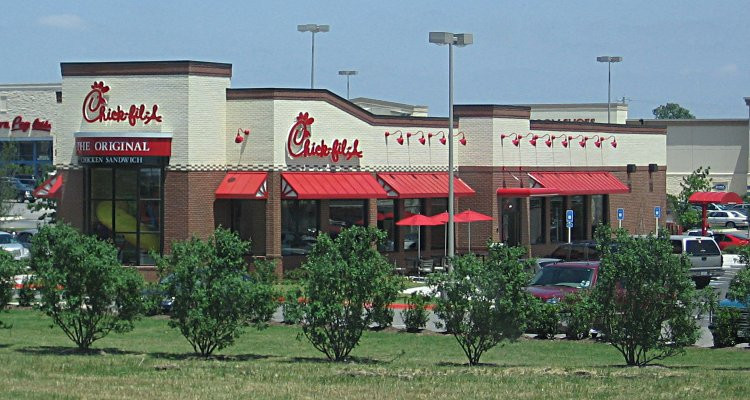
Chick-fil-A is the most popular fast-food enterprise among American youths.

According to a 2025 report from the Bank of America, Generation Z consumes less alcohol and prefer different diets than previous cohorts. Generation Z is more likely than young people in the past to try out new cuisines. There is also a growing interest in vegetarian foods. For breakfast, the top food choices among Generation Z are eggs, fruits, toast, pancakes, and cold cereals. As for drinks, they like milk, coffee, fruit juice, tea, energy drinks, and tap water. However, coffee consumption among Generation Z is lower than older cohorts. Milk consumption has declined among young people and the growing rate of lactose intolerance among the ethnically diverse Generation Z is part of the reason why. Generation Z mostly prefers to eat breakfast at home. Chick-fil-A, which remains one of the most popular fast-food restaurant chains in the United States among teenagers, despite the owners reportedly holding "conservative" values. Other popular restaurant chains among Generation Z include Starbucks, Chipotle, McDonald's, and Olive Garden.

==== Financial security ====
Though baby boomers have accumulated more wealth than later generations, Millennials and Generation X are accumulating wealth at comparable rates to baby boomers.

Generation Z is much more likely to turn to their parents for financial advice than Millennials. By 2019, credit cards became the most common form of debt for Generation Z, overtaking auto loans. The financial industry expects continued growth in credit activity by Generation Z, whose rate of credit delinquency is comparable to those of the Millennials and Generation X.

While American members of Generation Z are less optimistic about the state of their national economy than Millennials, they hold more positive views about their own economic prospects. Whereas the Millennials tend to prefer flexibility, Generation Z is more interested in certainty and stability. Whereas 23% of Millennials would leave a job if they thought they were not appreciated, only 15% of Generation Z would do the same, according to a Deloitte survey. A survey from the World Economic Forum (WEF) found that three quarters of Generation Z expected to work harder than previous generations. They also strive to be financially literate. Although some also aim to achieve financial independence and retire early (the FIRE lifestyle), most will have to compromise between owning a home and early retirement. As of 2025, Gen-Z women are saving for retirement at a higher rate than men, reversing a historical trend.

A 2025 report by the Bank of America noted that among members of Generation Z already employed, wage growth has been higher than in previous cohorts, especially among those with higher education. The bank also indicated that as a group, Generation Z would inherit the enormous wealth accumulated by their parents and grandparents over the next decade or so.

==== Housing and tourism ====
With regards to the housing market, they typically look for properties with amenities that are comparable to what they experienced as university students. Large numbers of this cohort are already saving money for buying a home, a goal many prefer to shopping, vacationing, or having a lavish wedding, or even going to college. They are also quite willing to have strangers as roommates in order to save on rent. By the late 2010s, the number of Zoomers who have taken out a mortgage was steadily rising. (Note: Also see the section on their transportation choices.) The first wave of Generation Z was buying homes at about the same rate as their grandparents, the Silent Generation, in late 2019, when they owned about 2% of the housing market. Judging by the amounts of mortgages, the top housing markets for Generation Z tend to have strong local economies and low cost of living. In general, whereas the Millennials are migrating North, Generation Z appears most interested in owning a home in the Midwest and the South. The growth of remote and hybrid work after the COVID-19 pandemic has made it feasible for Generation Z to own more affordable homes farther into the suburbs. Indeed, Generation Z is more interested in owning suburban homes than Millennials, but are more open to options than Baby Boomers. As of 2025, Generation Z is outpacing the Millennials and Generation X in home ownership when they were at the same age. But for many, home ownership remains a distant prospect due to their low wages and high costs of living.

As tourists, Generation Z is concerned about the environmental impact of their travels, especially carbon-offsetting practices, but affordability is still a more important factor for their decision-making.

=== Employment expectations and prospects ===
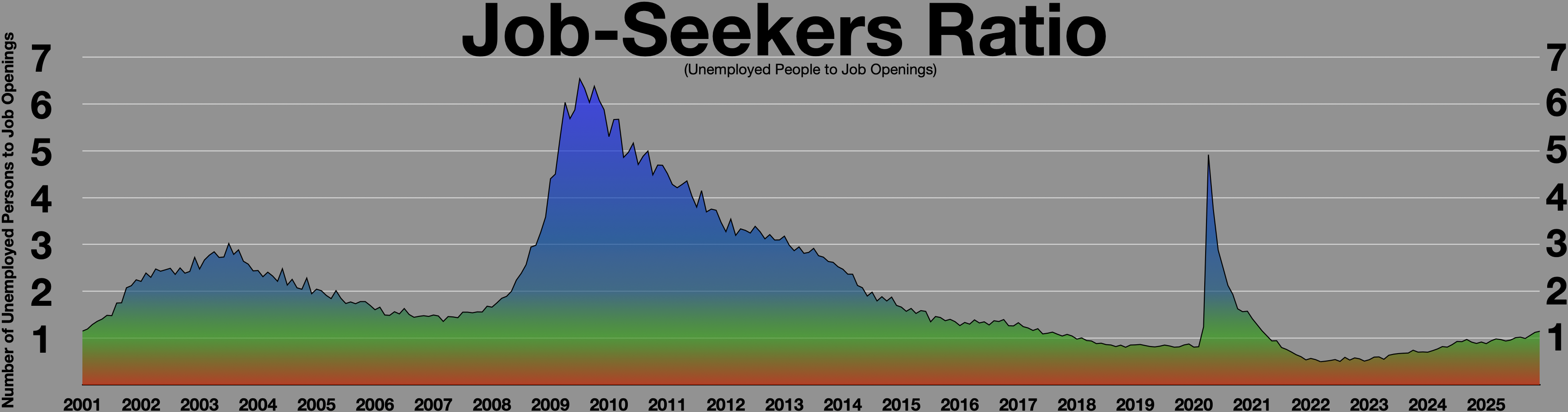
Job seekers ratio Cold job market Balanced job market Hot job market

Generation Z's preferred career choices—business, medicine, engineering, art, and IT—are similar to prior generations. They place high value in income, fulfillment, work-life balance, and job security. Generation Z places particularly high value on work-life balance compared to older cohorts and favors flexible work schedules. Millennial and Generation Z managers show higher support for remote work, with 74% having team members working remotely for a significant portion of their time compared to the Baby Boomers (58%). Most members of Generation Z prefer to work for a medium or large company rather than a startup or a government agency.

Access to the Internet has made self-employment much easier than it was in the past; indeed, by the mid-2010s, a majority of Generation Z were running their own businesses instead of holding "traditional" teen jobs, such as waiting tables. Morgan Stanley reported in 2019 that Millennials and Generation Z have been responsible for a surge in labor participation in the United States, and that while the American workforce was expanding, other G10 countries faced a shrinking number of workers. This development alleviates concerns over America's aging population which jeopardizes the solvency of various welfare programs. As of 2019, Millennials and Generation Z accounted for 38% of the American workforce, a number that is projected to rise to 58% in the incoming decade.

Due to declining interest in higher education and a tight labor market, in the early 2020s, young Americans could expect to be hired right after graduating high school. In May 2023, the unemployment rate of Americans aged 16 to 24 was 7.5%, the lowest in 70 years. Among teenagers 16 to 19, employment numbers have gone up, though not to the level seen among the Baby Boomers and Generation X when they were teenagers due to a variety of factors, including jobs being automated, outsourced, or given to immigrants, and state governments regulating the job market more tightly. Despite a relatively strong labor market and falling inflation, young Americans tend to be pessimistic about their economic prospects, worrying about a possible recession, expensive housing, and the possibility of being laid off.

Anxious about student debt, industrial automation, and artificial intelligence, Generation Z is increasingly interested in skilled trades, which they and their parents view as quicker and more affordable paths towards prosperity. Generation Z is more concerned about mass unemployment due to artificial intelligence (AI) rather than outsourcing or immigration. Indeed, many entry-level white-collar positions have been eliminated by AI, and since the late 2010s, the United States faces a shortage of blue-collar workers. Whenever they find themselves short on skills, Generation Z will pick up what they need using the Internet. Millennials and Generation Z are overwhelmingly more likely than Baby Boomers to think that it is the job of employees to train themselves.

=== Transportation choices ===
Many members of Generation Z no longer view car ownership as a status symbol, a life milestone, or a ticket to freedom. However, large swaths of this cohort have not had a driver's license or owned a car because of their economic situation rather than their concerns for the environment or dislike of cars. Moreover, decades of auto-centric urban development in the United States have led to under-investment in walkable neighborhoods, bicycle lanes, and public transit. The number of Generation Z consumers taking out auto loans was rising drastically during the late 2010s. While a significant portion of Generation Z consider environmental friendliness to be an important factor, more than their predecessors when they were at the same age, affordability was much for important to them. Generation Z is not particularly concerned with style or brand; they are more interested in safety. They tend to be more receptive towards self-driving cars. They are also interested in the interior electronic technology of the cars they might purchase. More specifically, they would like to be able to hook up their smartphones to the Bluetooth-capable audio systems and backup cameras.

== Education ==
Generation Z is more likely to search for the information they need on the Internet rather than going through a book and are accustomed to learning by watching videos. A survey by the Pew Research Center found that teenage girls were more likely to feel excited about what they learned at school than boys. A 2022 poll by YPulse found that the top five sets of skills Millennials and Generation Z wished they had learned at school were managing mental health, self-defense, survival skills and basic first aid, cooking, and personal finance.

During the 2010s, the reading proficiency and mathematical literacy American schoolchildren as a group were on a decline, putting them behind their peers in many other nations, especially in East Asia. Many American public schools suffer from inadequate or dated facilities. Some schools even leak when it rains. In its 2017 report on American infrastructure, the American Society of Civil Engineers (ASCE) gave public schools a score of D+. On the other hand, the majority of American public schools have acquired access to broadband Internet service, thereby increasing the frequency of digital learning.

The COVID-19 pandemic significantly disrupted the American education system. In the early 2020s, different school districts reported significant shortages of teachers. This problem is not new: it mostly affects students in economically deprived areas. Public schools across the United States have had falling enrollments due to population decline and defections to private schools and home schooling. As a result, public school funding has fallen.

Political activists are demanding that books dealing with sensitive topics relating to race and sexuality and those that include coarse language and explicit violence be removed from school libraries. How to educate students on American history has been a source of fierce debates, as has the teaching of race and sexuality. Support for parents' rights in deciding their children's educational contents and school choice, or the redirecting of tax money via vouchers to fund private schools, has grown considerably. To pacify angry parents and to comply with new state laws, many schoolteachers have opted to remove certain items from their lessons.

=== K-12 ===
D'Nealian cursive script

Since the 2000s, cursive writing has been de-emphasized in public education. As a result, Generation Z are less likely to read and write in cursive. Some states introduced legislation to teach it in their jurisdiction, partly because some 80% of historical records and documents of the United States was written by hand in cursive.

The percentage of American fourth-graders proficient in reading declined during the late 2010s, according to the National Assessment of Educational Progress (NAEP). There have been numerous reports in the 2010s on how U.S. students were falling behind their international counterparts in the STEM subjects, especially those from (East) Asia. For example, American schoolchildren put up a mediocre performance on the Program for International Student Assessment (PISA), administered to fifteen-year-old students around the world on reading comprehension, mathematics, and science, falling in the middle of the pack in 2015. In fact, reading scores dropped for all ethnic groups except Asians in the late 2010s, according to the NAEP. Nevertheless, American students ranked above the OECD average in science and computer literacy, as of 2021. As of 2024, NAEP data showed that the reading and mathematical skills of American schoolchildren on average still had not recovered from the COVID-19 pandemic. Furthermore, while the strongest students had regained lost grounds, the weakest continued to fall behind. An emphasis on rote memorization and speed gives as many as one in three students age five and up mathematical anxiety. Meanwhile, an increasing number of parents opted to send their children to enrichment and accelerated learning after-school or summer programs in the subject. By the mid-2010s, however, some public schools have begun offering enrichment programs to their students.

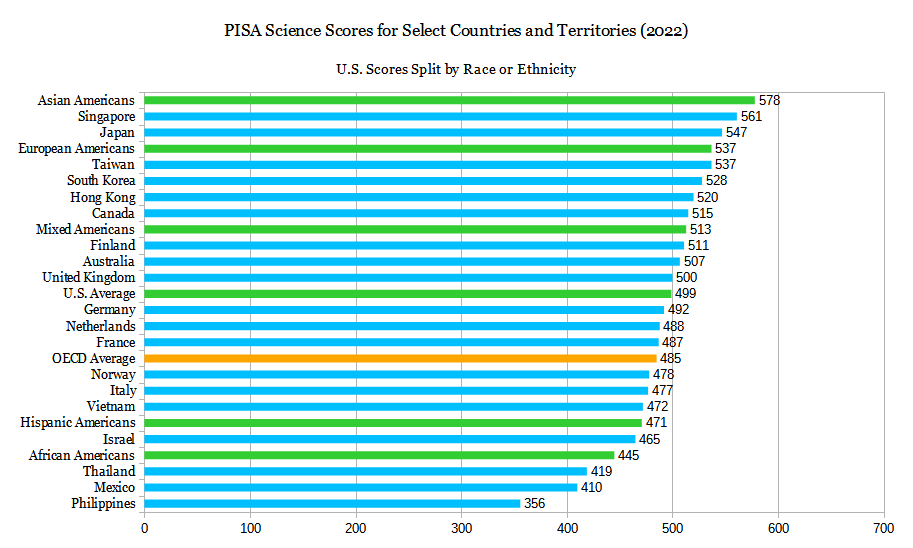

Although passing a high school physics course is linked to graduating from college with a STEM degree, something that is increasingly popular among Generation Z, just under two-fifths of high school graduates did in 2013, according to the American Institute of Physics.

Sex education has been reformed. While traditional lessons involving displays with ‘bananas and condoms’ to educate about basic barrier-based contraception remain common, newer approaches that emphasize financial responsibility, consent, and character development have been implemented. These reforms play a role in the significant drop in teenage birthrates. (Note: Also see the section on their sexual and reproductive habits.)

By the mid-2010s, over four-fifths of American high school students graduate on time and over 70% enroll in college right after graduation. However, nationally, only one-quarter of American high school seniors are able to do grade-level math and only 37% are proficient in reading, yet about half graduate from high school as A students, prompting concerns of grade inflation. In addition, while 93% of middle school students said they want to attend college, only 26% go on to do so and graduate within six years. Critics argue that American high schools are not giving students they need for their future lives and careers. On top of the high costs of collegiate education, the vacancy of potentially millions of skilled jobs that do not require a university degree is making lawmakers reconsider their stance on tertiary education.

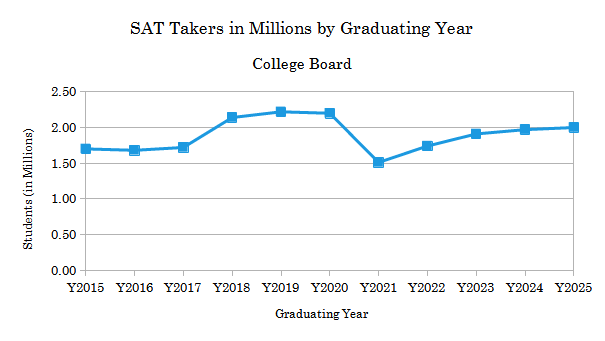
Except during the COVID-19 pandemic, the number of students taking the SAT has grown. But as more and more students take the SAT, average scores continue to decline.

Students' scores have been falling on a variety of standardized tests, such as the SAT, and in all subjects, especially in mathematics, a trend found among students of all backgrounds. After the COVID-19 pandemic, the entire cohort of college students in the 2022–23 academic year have lower average grades and mathematical standards.

=== Post-secondary ===
==== Technical, trades, and vocational schools ====
During the 2010s, the value higher education came under heightened skepticism due to rising costs and disappointing results. According to the Department of Education, people with technical or vocational training are slightly more likely to be employed than those with a bachelor's degree and significantly more likely to be employed in their fields of specialty. By the late 2010s, the United States was facing a shortage of skilled tradespeople, because a majority of high-school students were still aiming for colleges and universities. But things were changing as more and more members of Generation Z considered alternatives to higher education. Career counselors are in extremely high demand; they are not only called for not just appointments invited to career fairs and orientation sessions for new students. With growing numbers of high-school students opting for trade schools and vocational training programs, enrollments in higher education have been falling.

==== Colleges and universities ====
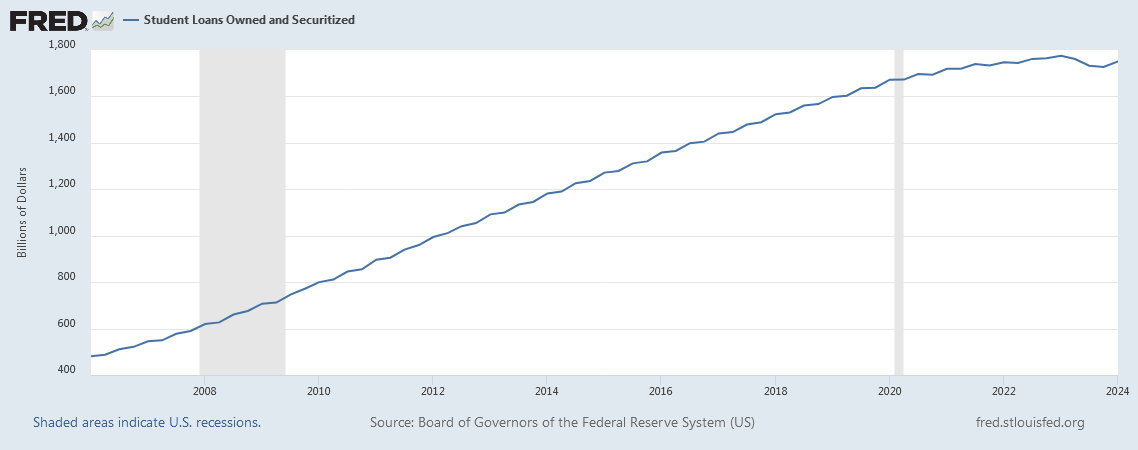
Unlike their predecessors, Generation Z aims to avoid accumulating so much student debt.

Due to low standards and requirements in high school, many Americans are entering institutions of higher learning, including elite schools, with deficient reading comprehension skills and are unable and unwilling to complete long reading assignments. In addition, about a quarter of American university students failed to graduate within six years in the late 2010s and those who did faced diminishing wage premiums.

As Generation Z enters high school and preparing for college, a primary concern is paying for a higher education without acquiring debt. As of 2019, the total college debt has exceeded $1.5 trillion, and two out of three college graduates are saddled with debt. In response to these challenges, many schools have diversified their sources of revenue in order to offer their students greater tuition discounts. Students also report interest in Reserve Officers' Training Corps (ROTC) programs as a means of covering college costs. Indeed, college subsidies are one of the most attractive things about signing up for military service. Another enticement is signing bonuses, whose amounts vary according to specialty.

Domestic undergraduate enrollment since the early 2010s. Due to population aging, the number of college-aged people in the United States will fall after 2025, making it easier for people born in the late 2000s and after to get admitted. Indeed, by the mid-2020s, it has already become noticeably easier to get admitted to most colleges and universities in the United States, though demand for very top American institutions will likely remain more or less unchanged. Institutions address challenges of a small pool of prospective students by dropping programs with low student interest, including many in the liberal arts and the humanities, like gender studies and critical race theory, and creating majors for emerging fields, such as artificial intelligence, or professional programs, such as law enforcement, and investing in online learning programs. The arrival of SARS-CoV-2 in the United States in 2020 merely accelerated the process. As a consequence of the economic downturn, families chose to either delay or avoid sending their children to institutions of higher education altogether.

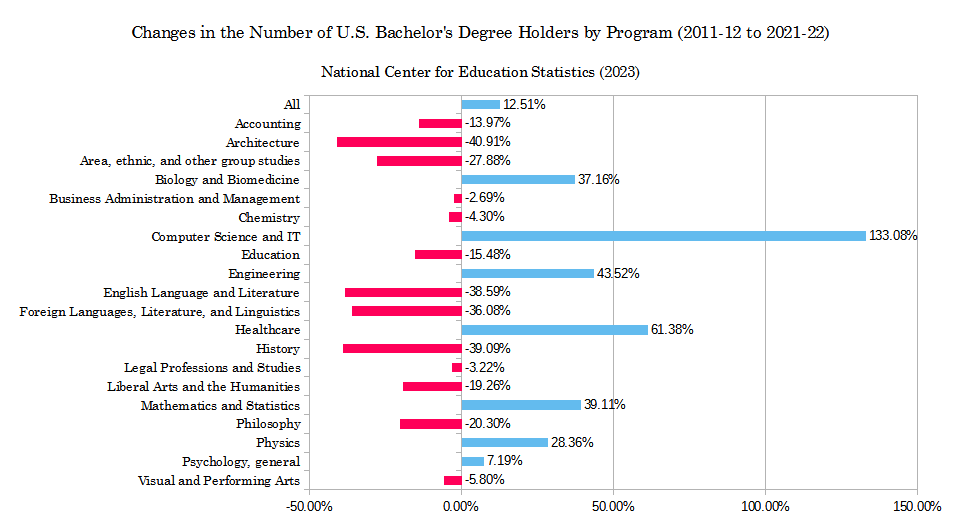
Most STEM subjects and healthcare grew in popularity while the humanities and the liberal arts have declined due to market forces.

Members of Generation Z are anxious to pick majors that teach them marketable skills, with an overwhelming majority consider job preparation to be the point of college. A 2018 Gallup poll on over 32,000 university students randomly selected from 43 schools from across the United States found that just over half (53%) of them thought their chosen major would lead to gainful employment. STEM students expressed the highest confidence (62%) while those in the liberal arts were the least confident (40%). Just over one in three thought they would learn the skills and knowledge needed to become successful in the workplace. While the number of students majoring in the humanities has fallen significantly, those in science, technology, engineering, and mathematics, or STEM, have risen sharply. While about half of STEM graduates work in non-STEM jobs, people with collegiate STEM training still tend to earn more, regardless of whether or not their job is STEM-related or not.

By the late 2010s, the historical trend of men being more likely to have higher education has reversed. Women are now more likely to enroll in university than men, a trend accelerated by the COVID-19 pandemic. By the end of the 2020–21 academic year, 59.5% of university students were women. This growing sex gap has been growing for four decades in the United States in parallel with other countries of middle to high income. Among those who attend college or university, women are more likely then men to graduate with a degree within six years.

== Health issues ==
=== General ===
A 2020 study of data from 1999 to 2015 suggests that children living with married parents tended to have lower rates of early-life mortality than those living with unmarried or single parents and non-parents.

==== Puberty ====
For girls born in the United States, the average age of the onset of puberty has been steadily falling since the late twentieth century. According to a 2019 meta-analysis the age of pubertal onset among girls was between 8.8 and 10.3 years in the United States. Early puberty is associated with a variety of mental health issues (such as anxiety and depression), early sexual activity, venereal diseases, alcoholism, and substance abuse, among other problems. Furthermore, factors known for prompting mental health problems—early childhood stress, absent fathers, domestic conflict, and low socioeconomic status—are themselves linked to early pubertal onset. According to Dr. Dr. Shruthi Mahalingaiah, body-mass index is a strong predictor of precocious puberty. Possible causes of early puberty could be positive, namely improved nutrition, or negative, such as obesity, stress, trauma, exposure to hormone-disrupting chemicals, air pollutants, heavy metals. Girls of African ancestry on average enter puberty first, followed by those of Hispanic, European, and Asian extraction, in that order. But African-American girls are less likely to face the negative effects of puberty than their counterparts of European descent.

=== Physical ===
Data from the NCES showed that in the academic year 2018–19, 15% of students receiving special education under the Individuals with Disabilities Education Act was suffering from "other health impairments"—such as asthma, diabetes, epilepsy, heart problems, hemophilia, lead poisoning, leukemia, nephritis, rheumatic fever, sickle cell anemia, and tuberculosis. The American Optometric Association sounded the alarm on a link between the regular use of handheld electronic devices and eyestrain.

Research by the Mayo Clinic in Minnesota found food allergies are becoming increasingly common since the early 2000s. Today, one in twelve American children has a food allergy, with peanut allergy being the most prevalent type. Nut allergies, in general, have quadrupled and shellfish allergies have increased 40% between 2004 and 2019. In all, about 36% of American children have some kind of allergy. One possible explanation, supported by the National Institute of Allergy and Infectious Diseases, is that parents keep their children "too clean for their own good." According to this "hygiene hypothesis," exposure to allergens gives the infant's immune system exercise, making it less likely to overreact. Evidence for this includes the fact that children living on a farm are consistently less likely to be allergic than their counterparts who are raised in the city, and that children born in a developed country to parents who immigrated from developing nations are more likely to be allergic than their parents are.

=== Mental ===
A 2018 survey by the American Psychological Association revealed that Generation Z had the weakest mental health of any living generation; some 91% of this demographic cohort reported physical or emotion symptoms associated with stress. Surgeon General of the United States Vivek Murthy stated in a 2021 advisory that the shares of young people having suicidal ideation and suffering from persistent feelings of sadness or hopelessness had grown precipitously compared to the previous decade. There is a growing body of evidence that there is a direct link between having access to social media at a young age and weak mental health, especially among teenage girls. Parents who are overly involved in their children's lives are likely making matters worse by preventing their children from developing emotional resilience. Across the United States, university students are seeking mental health support. Many are discussing their distress over climate change with their psychotherapists.

Compared to the 2000s, the 2010s saw a marked increase in the rate of suicide among adolescents, due to an increased willingness by families and coroners to label a death as a result of suicide, depression or opioid usage. Nadine Kaslow, a psychiatrist and behavioral scientist at the Emory University School of Medicine, pointed to the weakening of familial and other social bonds and the heavy use of modern communications technology, which exposes people to the risk of cyber-bullying. (Note: Also see their use of information technology.) The number of American teenagers who exhibited the classic symptoms of depression jumped during the 2010s. Psychologist Jean Twenge and her colleagues found that this growth of mental health issues was associated with spending more time in front of a screen. It is not clear, however, whether depression causes a teenager to spend more time online or the other way around. Teens who spent more time online were more likely to not have enough sleep, a major predictor of depression. By the mid-2020s, however, the growth of depression and anxiety among young Americans has stalled or slightly reversed, though the reasons remain poorly understood.

In its analysis of data from the late 2010s, the American Academy of Pediatrics found that just under half of Americans aged six to seventeen slept for nine hours on most days. Compared to those who did not get enough sleep, those who did were more curious, more likely to finish their homework, and more invested in their education. The risk factors associated with sleep deprivation among children to be the low educational attainment of parents or caregivers, being from families living below the federal poverty line, higher digital media usage, more negative childhood experiences, and mental illnesses. Sleep deprivation is also linked to reduced performance in school and obesity. American teenagers share a common habit of having their smartphones on at night, at the expense of the quality of their own sleep.

There has been some evidence that COVID-19 lockdowns have accelerated the aging of adolescent brains (as measured by cortical thinning), especially among girls. According to the National Center for Education Statistics (NCES), between the academic years 2011–12 and 2018–19, the number of students aged three to twenty-one receiving special education under the Individuals with Disabilities Education Act (IDEA) increased from 6.4 million to 7.1 million, one third of whom suffered from a specific learning disability. After specific learning disabilities, the most common types of learning disorders included speech and language impairment (19%), autism (11%), and developmental delay (7%).

Gains in the IQ scores of Americans first observed during the twentieth century—the Flynn effect—continued in the early twenty-first century, at least up until 2014. However, creativity scores, as measured by the Torrance Test of Creative Thinking, were in decline between the 1990s and the late 2000s. This is partly because American educations have chosen to emphasize standardization and test scores at the expense of encouraging creativity, and because American parents have been allowing their children little play time but a lot of screen time.

== Political views and participation ==
=== General trends ===
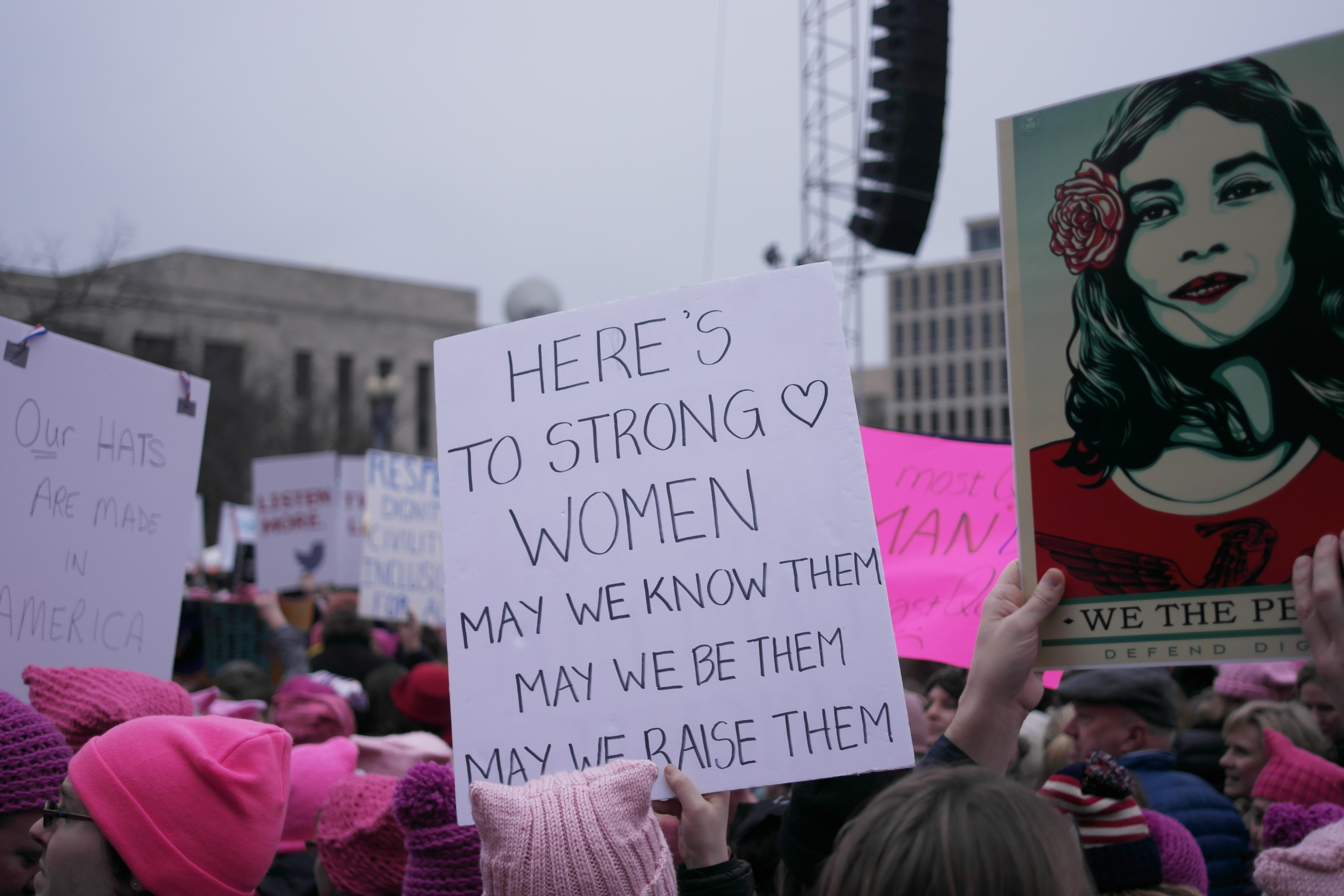
One of the defining moments when the first wave of Generation Z came of age was the 2017 Women's March. Protestors wore their distinctive pink pussyhats.

Generation Z has demonstrated with their votes between the late 2010s and the mid-2020s that they are loyal to neither main political parties of the United States. In fact, they largely distrust them and generally expect more substantive information on policies before casting their vote. Polls conducted in 2025 consistently show that in terms of political views, Generation Z can be divided into two broad groups. For the first group, which came of age before the pandemic, the defining political events of their formative years were the first term of President Donald Trump, the Women's March, the Black Lives Matter movement, and gun-control demonstrations. This group tends to lean to the left. The second group experienced COVID lockdowns as secondary students and became adults during the presidency of Joe Biden. This group is noticeably more conservative than the first; for them, the Make America Great Again movement (MAGA) is counterculture. They are also more mistrustful of authority.

While some of the key issues for this cohort are climate change, gender equality, reproductive rights, and gun violence, economic concerns are the most important ones for Generation Z, especially inflation, the cost of housing, income inequality, and taxes. Among college students, the top issues are healthcare reforms, the cost of education, and civil rights. Most do not care about Middle Eastern conflicts and the associated protests on college campuses, but are more interested in lucrative careers after graduation. Among young men, a majority think that both parties hold extreme views, but that the Republican Party is more so than the Democratic Party. Being disappointed at the status quo has been an impetus for them to run for office, taking advantage of the fact that a majority of voters would like to see younger faces in politics.

Social media networks have played a crucial role in how members Generation Z form and share their political views. The algorithms of these platforms typically serve contents that reinforce the views of the user and help them mind other like-minded individuals. There is evidence that TikTok has led to the rightward shift of Generation Z. On the other hand, it has also brought Representative Alexandria Ocasio-Cortez to the attention of many Gen-Z women. Compared to older cohorts, Generation Z as a group is more skeptical of the American federal government and less concerned about the possible risks to national security posed by TikTok; many oppose the proposed TikTok ban. As a result, politicians from both major political parties have been trying to appeal to young voters on social networks, including TikTok itself.

Generation Z's political views have also been shaped by the way they are taught history. Changes to the curriculum of American history during the 2010s, especially in left-leaning states, have led to large numbers young Americans having a low opinion of their country and their historical figures. On the other hand, the decline of belief in American exceptionalism is a long-term trend, not unique to this cohort.

=== Sex differences ===
There are significant sex differences in political views among Generation Z, with young women under 30 years of age being broadly left-wing and young men being right-leaning on a variety of issues from immigration to sexual harassment. A gender gap has been observed since 1980, when women were more likely to vote for the Democratic Party and men for the Republican Party. But this gap has widened during the 2010s and 2020s.

According to Gallup, the gap as of early 2024 among voters below the age of 30 was 30 percentage points. Some young men believe that women's progress has come at their expense, that it should be acceptable to discuss men's mental health issues, that men's economic concerns have not been addressed, or that most politicians have ignored them. Facing despair and political homelessness, many young men find Donald Trump an appealing alternative.

In contrast, many young women became politically active because of the 2016 presidential campaign of Secretary of State Hillary Clinton, the me-too movement, the Dobbs v. Jackson decision on abortion by the Supreme Court, and the 2024 presidential campaign of Vice President Kamala Harris (after incumbent President Joe Biden announced he would not seek re-election). In fact, Harris managed to secure the support of many young female voters, who previously only reluctantly voted for Biden or did not vote at all, and her support among women has been rising faster than among young men.

Another reason for the gender gap is the fact that young women are better educated and earning more than men in the contemporary American economy. In all, American women below the age of 30 have been moving leftward on a number of key political issues while young men have not moved as much. There is little to no gap in terms of educational attainment or race. Meanwhile, a majority of Gen Z men are engaging with contents from "masculinity influencers" on the Internet, who promote traditional gender roles in which men make the decisions and women comply.

=== Elections ===
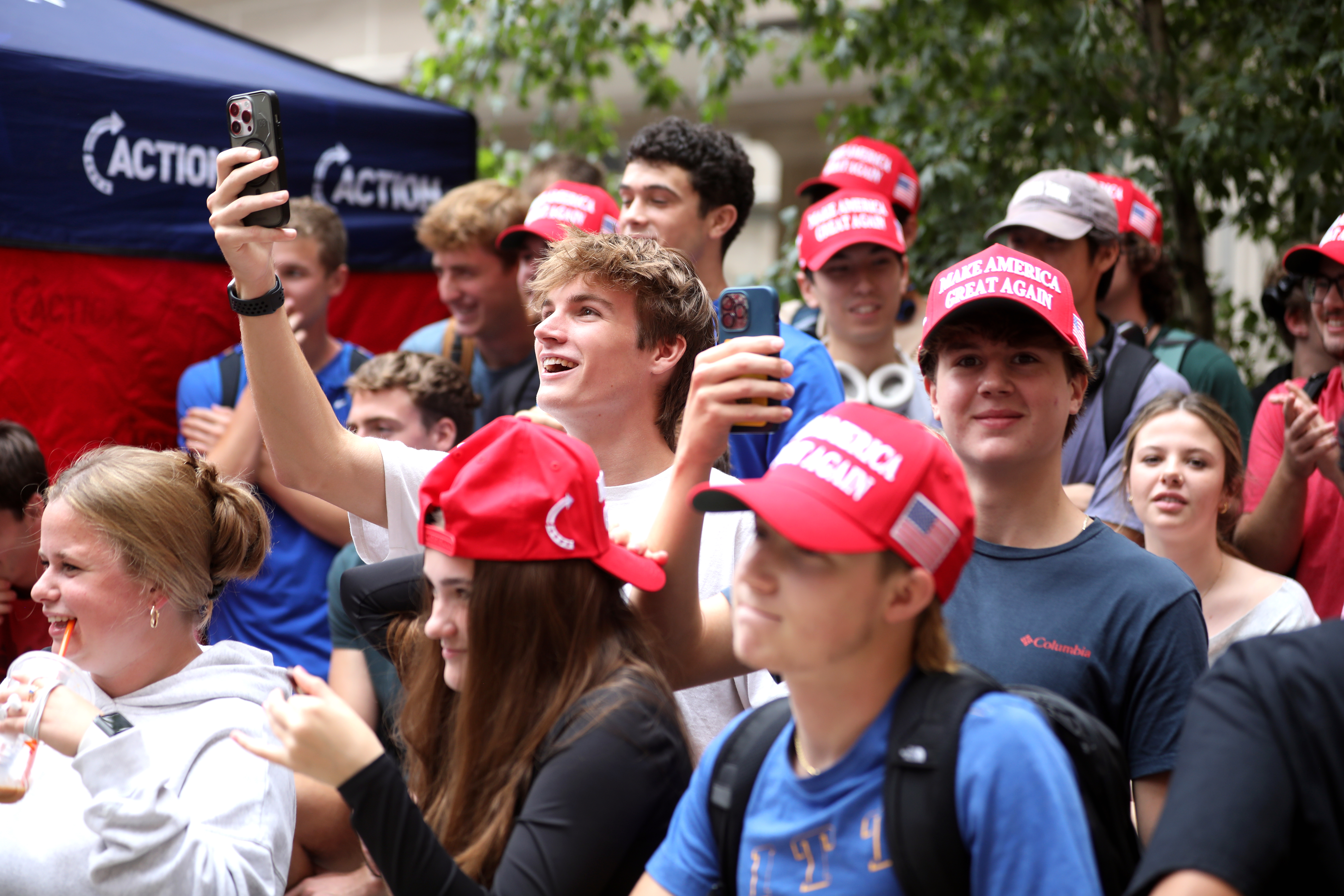
Young Americans, seen here with their MAGA hats, have been turning towards the right since 2020.

As more and more members of Generation Z reached adulthood during the 2020s, voter turnouts in this cohort has been growing, even though young people are still less likely to vote than older generations. In particular, political participation among young women has jumped, breaking a historical trend in which young men were more likely to vote. Living in an age of political polarization has motivated this cohort to participate in the political process. A survey conducted before the 2020 U.S. presidential election by Barnes and Noble Education on 1,500 college students nationwide found that just one third of respondents believe who they vote for is "private information" and three quarters of them find it difficult to find unbiased news sources.

2018 was the first year when the majority of voters aged 18 to 24 were members of Generation Z, and they cast 4% of the votes. During the 2020 U.S. presidential election, Millennials and Generation Z voted for Joe Biden by a margin of 20 percentage points. Generation Z cast 8% of the votes that year. High youth turnout was a factor behind Biden's victory. Yet, young people's support for him fell quickly afterwards. By late 2021, only 29% of adults in this age group approved of his performance as president whereas 50% disapproved, a gap of 21 points, the largest of all age groups. In the 2022 midterm election, voters below the age of 30 were the only major age group supporting the Democratic Party, but their numbers still were large enough to prevent Republicans from controlling the majority of seats in the Senate. In the 2024 presidential election, Americans aged 18 to 29 voted for Kamala Harris by a margin of only four points, according to exit polls conducted by the Associated Press. Donald Trump and his Republican Party made considerable gains among young voters, especially young men and European Americans. Among Gen-Z women, while those of ethnic-minority backgrounds overwhelmingly supported Harris, those of European ancestry were evenly split between Harris and Trump. This election has broken the historical trend of young people generally voting for Democrats. Generation Z has been shifting towards the right since 2020. Even so, polls conducted after that election showed that the majority of Generation Z disapproved of the performance of President Donald Trump because he had failed to address their concerns about the economy, especially inflation and the cost of living.

=== Trust in the institutions ===
In 2019, the Pew Research Center interviewed over 2,000 Americans aged 18 and over on their views of various components of the federal government. They found that 54% of the people between the ages of 18 and 29 wanted larger government compared to 43% who preferred smaller government and fewer services. Older people were more likely to pick the second option. (Note: Overall, the American people remained divided over the size and scope of government, with 48% preferring smaller government with fewer services and 46% larger government and more services. Pew found that the most popular federal agencies were the U.S. Postal Service (90% favorable), the National Park Service (86%), NASA (81%), the CDC (80%), the FBI (70%), the Census Bureau (69%), the SSA (66%), the CIA, and the Federal Reserve (both 65%). There was very little to no partisan divide on the Postal Service, the National Park Service, NASA, the CIA, or the Census Bureau.) 2018 polls conducted by the Pew Research Center found that 70% of Americans aged 13 to 17 wanted the government to play a more active role in solving their problems.

A 2022 poll by Pew showed that overall, medical experts, the military, and scientists were among the most trusted groups in the United States. But while a majority of Americans believed it was important for their country to remain a global leader in science, people aged 18 to 29 were somewhat less inclined to think so compared to older cohorts and were slightly more optimistic about the standing of U.S. science on the international stage. However, Generation Z's trust in institutions or the nation itself has been declining. Polls conducted during the early 2020s showed that only a minority of Americans aged 18–29 thought that their country was heading in the right direction or agreed that democracy was the best form of government. About two thirds did not trust their government.

=== Gun ownership ===
Gun ownership among U.S. adults, 2017
1. Lived in a gun-free household (57.0%)
2. Currently own a gun (30.0%)
3. Lived with a gun owner (11.0%)
4. No answer / rounding (2.00%)

The March for Our Lives, a protest taking place in the aftermath of the Stoneman Douglas High School shooting in 2018 was described by various media outlets as being led by students and young people. Some even describe it as the political "awakening" of Generation Z or that these protesters were "the voice of a generation on gun control." While this massive protest was indeed organized by the survivors of the Parkland shooting, albeit with the assistance of well-resourced and older benefactors, the reality was a little more complicated. According to a field survey by The Washington Post interviewing every fifth person at the protest, only ten percent of the participants were 18 years of age or younger. Meanwhile, the adult participants of the protest had an average age of just under 49. Polls conducted by Gallup and the Pew Research Center found that support for stricter gun laws among people aged 18 to 29 and 18 to 36, respectively, is statistically no different from that of the general population. According to Gallup, 57% of Americans are in favor of stronger gun control legislation. In a 2017 poll, Pew found that among the age group 18 to 29, 27% personally owned a gun and 16% lived with a gun owner, for a total of 43% living in a household with at least one gun. Nationwide, a similar percentage of American adults lived in a household with a gun. (See chart.)

=== Economics and the environment ===

Harvard University's Institute of Politics Youth Poll from 2019 found that support for single-payer universal healthcare and tuition-free free college dropped, down 8% to 47% and down 5% to 51%, respectively, if cost estimates were provided. According to the Hispanic Heritage Foundation, about eight out of ten members of Generation Z identify as "fiscal conservatives." In 2018, the International Federation of Accountants released a report on a survey of 3,388 individuals aged 18 to 23 hailing from G20 countries, with a sample size of 150 to 300 per country. They found that healthcare is a top priority for Generation Z in Canada, France, Germany, and the United States.

Surveys conducted in the late 2010s and early 2020s indicated that majorities of Generation Z believed that climate change was real and was caused by human activities. Differences in opinion might be due to education as younger Americans are more likely to have been taught about climate change in schools than their elders. Moreover, Generation Z broadly supports the United States transitioning away from fossil fuels and towards (next-generation) nuclear reactors and renewable energy. Majorities of this cohort also favored carbon capture and a ban on Arctic drilling.

A 2018 Gallup poll found that people aged 18 to 29 have a more favorable view of socialism than capitalism, 51% to 45%. Older Americans consistently prefer capitalism to socialism.

=== Abortion, sexuality, and family values ===
In 2016, the Varkey Foundation and Populus conducted an international study examining the attitudes of 20,000 people aged 15 to 21 in twenty countries. They found that just under two thirds of young Americans favored keeping abortion legal, in line with the global average. Gallup polls conducted in 2019 revealed that 62% of people aged 18 to 29—older members of Generation Z and younger Millennials—support giving women access to abortion while 33% opposed. At the national level, Americans are split on the issue of abortion. Many participants in the annual March for Life in Washington, D.C. in the early 2020s are members of Generation Z. However, there is a sex gap in which Gen Z men are significantly less likely to support legal abortion than women and do not think of restrictions on reproductive choices as something important.

A 2018 poll conducted by Harris on behalf of the LGBT advocacy group GLAAD found that despite being frequently described as the most tolerant segment of society, people aged 18 to 34—most Millennials and the oldest members of Generation Z—have become less accepting of LGBT individuals compared to previous years.

2018 surveys of teenagers 13 to 17 and adults aged 18 or over conducted by the Pew Research Center found that Generation Z has broadly similar views to the Millennials on various political and social issues. 67% were indifferent towards pre-nuptial cohabitation. 49% considered single motherhood to be neither a positive nor a negative for society. 62% saw increased ethnic or racial diversity as good for society. As did 48% for same-sex marriage, and 53% for interracial marriage. In most cases, Generation Z and the Millennials tended to hold different views from the Silent Generation, while the Baby Boomers and Generation X were in between. In the case of financial responsibility in a two-parent household, though, majorities from across the generations answered that it should be shared, with 58% for the Silent Generation, 73% for the Baby Boomers, 78% for Generation X, and 79% for both the Millennials and Generation Z. Across all the generations surveyed, at least 84% thought that both parents ought to be responsible for rearing children. About 13% of Generation Z thought that mothers should be the primary caretaker of children, with similar percentages for the other demographic cohorts. Very few thought that fathers should be the ones mainly responsible for taking care of children. Pew, however, noted that the views of this demographic cohort could change in the future as they age and due to new events. Even so, they could play a significant role in the shaping of the political landscape.

A 2023 poll by The Wall Street Journal and the National Opinion Research Center (NORC) at the University of Chicago found that about 23% of people adults below the age of 30 thought that having children was important, 9 percentage points below those aged 65 and above.

=== Immigration ===

In a 2016 survey conducted by the Varkey Foundation and Populus, the question of whether or not those 15 to 21 favored legal migration received mixed responses. In the United States, that margin of support was 16%, higher than the global average of 8%. (See chart above.) According to Gallup, Americans aged 18 to 34 are more likely to view immigration as a "good thing" than their elders. By 2024, a clear majority of young adults supported increased patrols along the American-Mexican border to combat illegal immigration into the United States.

=== Foreign policy ===
Polls conducted in the late 2010s and early 2020s of adults under the age of 30 show that the top foreign-policy issues for this cohort were combating climate change, preventing the proliferation of weapons of mass destruction, and defending the United States from terrorism. Maintaining American military strength and defending American allies were not as important to young voters. Moreover, young Americans are markedly less concerned about combating America's geopolitical adversaries, notably China and Russia, compared to older voters, who still have lingering sentiments from the (previous) Cold War. A 2019 poll by the International Federation of Accountants found that in the United States, 52% of Generation Z wanted their government to focus more on national problems, a 24% margin ahead of those who thought otherwise. Similarly, 2020 poll conducted by the Center for American Progress found that only 18% of Americans supported liberal internationalism, which has been part of American foreign policy since the time of President Franklin D. Roosevelt, while young Americans were even less likely to support it, contributing to a return towards isolationism, a historical norm dating back to the Founding Fathers. Polls indicates that by 2025, there is broad support for isolationism and tariffs (imposed by President Donald Trump in his trade wars) among Gen-Z Americans. One by the Carnegie Endowment for International Peace found that although American Zoomers were not averse to international engagements, they preferred a more modest role for the United States in global affairs, including in dealing with China, Israel, and Ukraine. (See the Second Cold War, Israel's War in Gaza, and the Russo-Ukrainian War.)

== Religious tendencies ==

Although Christianity remains the single most popular religion in the United States, secularism has been growing thanks to Millennials and Generation Z. Americans who came of age during the 2020s were much more likely to have been raised in secular households. About three quarters of those who grew up in such an environment continued to be irreligious. Among those raised in highly religious households, just under a third still attended religious services regularly or thought of religion as important in their lives. While a slight majority of American teenagers attending public schools wore religious symbols and attire, they were much less likely to pray before lunch or a sport event, invite their peers to join a religious club, and to read religious texts outside of class. Girls were more likely to discuss religion with their friends than boys.

Members of Generation Z were more likely to start questioning their parents' religions before the age of 18 than previous cohorts and those who have left typically did not return. Much of the decline of religion in the United States is due to people born after 1990 leaving their families' faiths. Young adults born in the 2000s rarely become Christian after being raised in a non-Christian household. A majority of Generation Z disagreed that it was necessary to raise children in a religious household, and only a minority deemed religion to be an important part of their lives. On the other hand, the Pew Research Center found the gap in spirituality among the old and the young to be more modest.

In a 2016 poll, Barna found that Millennials and Generation Z were equally likely to require factual evidence before believing in something and to consider the Bible to be at odds with science. The same Barna survey revealed that the percentage of atheists and agnostics was 21% among Generation Z, higher than all previous cohorts. Moreover, whereas in the past, women were broadly more religious than men, during the 2020s, young women secularizing faster than young men, and have become less religious than men. Youths who still hold private religious beliefs are also less likely to go to church. When asked what their biggest barriers to faith were, irreligious members of Generation Z pointed to what they perceived as internal contradictions of the religion and its believers. Many also took issue with religious leaders' positions on certain social and political topics, such as abortion, homosexuality, and sex-abuse scandals of the Church. Young women in particular disapproved of the Church's emphasis on traditional gender roles, especially the subservience of women before men, and the culture of purity, which insisted that women must be chaste or modest because they were responsible for the thoughts of men. Living in the Age of Information, they found it easy to be disillusioned by religious teachings and to deconvert themselves. Women having access to higher education, having careers, and deprioritizing matrimony and reproduction were also contributing factors.

== Risky behaviors ==
=== General trends ===
Research from the Annie E. Casey Foundation conducted in 2016 found Generation Z youth had lower teen pregnancy rates, less substance abuse, and higher on-time high school graduation rates compared with Millennials. The researchers compared teens from 2008 and 2014 and found a 40% drop in teen pregnancy, a 38% drop in drug and alcohol abuse, and a 28% drop in the percentage of teens who did not graduate on time from high school. Three-quarters of American twelfth-graders believed their peers disapproved of binge drinking. Members of Generation Z tend to be more worried about mental health issues and getting good grades than unplanned pregnancies or binge drinking.

=== Cigarette-smoking and substance abuse ===
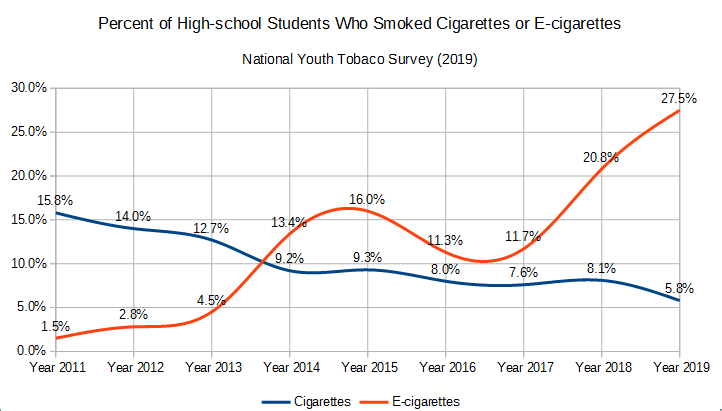

Although the number of American teenagers who smoked cigarettes was steadily falling during the 2010s, the prevalence of electronic cigarette use was rising. As of 2019, there is no evidence linking the availability of electronic cigarettes to a decline in traditional smoking among youths. Public opinion has turned against electronic cigarettes and various state and local governments are seeking to restrict use. By the mid-2020s, tobacco product use of all types among teenagers was on the decline, a trend largely driven by falling e-cigarette demand.

Bloomberg reported in 2019 that members of Generation Z were twice as likely as an average American to consume cannabis. About 1% of the number of legal marijuana consumers came this demographic cohort, and that number tripled in 2019. Generation Z is the first to be born into a time when the legalization of marijuana at the federal level is being seriously considered. As of 2019, cannabis is legal in 33 U.S. states as well as in Canada and Uruguay. Even though Generation Z may not think of cannabis as anything more than a controversial issue, there is mounting concern on its effects on human health. A survey of literature reveals that marijuana usage is linked to, among other things, impaired driving, higher risks of stroke, testicular cancer, memory loss, and certain mental illnesses, such as psychosis. Compared to those who do not use cannabis or those who start after they reach 16 years, people who start before that age suffer from reduced cognitive functioning and higher levels of impulsivity. About one in ten marijuana users developed a substance use disorder, and those who use it before the age of 18 are more likely to suffer from it. Marijuana use in the United States is three times above the global average, but in line with other Western democracies. Forty-four percent of American high-school seniors have tried the drug at least once, and the typical age of first-use is 16, similar to the typical age of first-use for alcohol but lower than the first-use age for other illicit drugs.

=== Early sexual intercourse and adolescent pregnancy ===
Teen birth rate by state in 2015

Teen birth rates have declined over the past few decades.

Historically, the birth rate of teenagers peaked in the late 1950s and early 1960s. However, at that time, most teenage parents were married. In the early twenty-first century, nine in ten births to the age group 15-19 are to unmarried mothers.

Social norms have changed; it is now not unusual for teenagers to delay or avoid sexual intercourse altogether. Younger teenagers are more likely to practice abstinence than their older counterparts. A report published by the Center for Disease Control and Prevention (CDC) in early 2018 found the number of high school students who have had sex fell from 47% in 2005 down to 41% in 2015, with the most dramatic drop taking place between 2013 and 2015. On top of that, among never-married teens who have had sex, overwhelming majorities reported they used contraception the first time they did it. There are a few reasons for this. First, Millennials and Generation Z are more focused on the consequences of sex than their predecessors were. Second, there has been growing concern over unwanted sexual advances, especially in the wake of the Me-too movement. Writing for The Spectator, Douglas Murray dubbed this the "sexual counter-revolution." (Note: As opposed to the Sexual Revolution of the 1960s, which saw the liberalization of attitudes towards sex.) Third, as a consequence of the precarious contemporary economy, young adults today are more likely to be living with their parents rather than on their own, with a romantic partner, or a spouse.

A 2016 analysis by the CDC discovered that teenage birthrates nosedived between 1991, when they reached a crisis point, and 2014, when they dropped by 60%, a record low. The collapse of birthrates among blacks and (non-white) Hispanics, down 50%, was largely responsible for this development. However, their birthrates remained, on average, twice as high as those of their white counterparts. The birth rates of teenage Asians and Pacific Islanders were even lower, about half that of whites. In a 2014 paper, economists Melissa S. Kearney and Phillip B. Levine howed that popular TV programs depicting the reality of teenage parenthood, such as MTV's 16 and Pregnant and its Teen Mom sequels, have played a significant role in the reduction of teenage childbearing. Researchers from the Guttmacher Institute showed that the fall in teenage birthrates is likely not due to terminated pregnancies. The number of abortions remained the same or decreased in all U.S. states except for Vermont. (Note: According to this 2018 report from the Guttmacher Institute, Western Europe, North America, and Northern Europe have the lowest abortions rates globally, at 16, 17, and 18 per a thousand women of reproductive age, respectively.) This contradicts the historically negative correlation between birthrates and abortions. Modern youths also have better access to contraception than did their predecessors when they were at the same age. A CDC analysis found that the rates of teens using a long-acting and reversible method of contraception, such as an intrauterine device (IUD), jumped from 0.4% in 2005 to 7.1% in 2013. The teen birthrate continues to fall in the late 2010s, down to 17.4 births per 1000 in 2018. In 2022, it fell to 13.5, the lowest on record.

== Social trends ==
=== Upbringing ===
By the time of Generation Z, the nuclear family had ceased to be the norm.

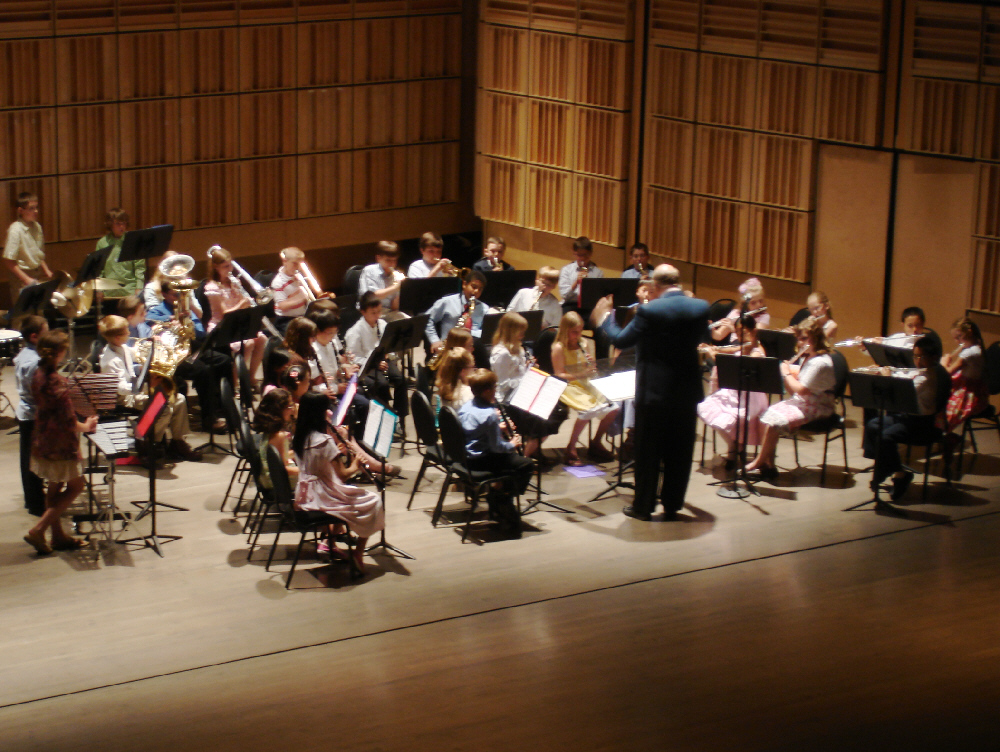
An elementary school orchestra (2009). Contemporary American parents tend to invest more in their children's cultural capital.

Between the 1960s and the 2010s, the percentage of children living with their married parents in their first marriage declined from approximately three quarters to just under half. At the same time, the share of children raised by single parents rose sharply. During the 2000s and 2010s, the number of American children raised by their grandparents or other family members rather than their parents also grew.

American parents of the early twenty-first century usually do not insist that their children share the same political or religious beliefs, to follow the same traditions, or to get married and have children. Rather, they emphasize ethical behavior, tolerance, generosity, and financial independence.

Parents from wealthier backgrounds are less likely to have children out of wedlock and more likely to stay married, with desirable outcomes for their children, including better social and cognitive development and educational attainment. By contrast, children born into the middle class or the lower class are less likely to have married parents than before. They also tend to have younger parents who did not intend to have them and more siblings.

Upper middle-class and wealthy American couples living in the cities tend to have fewer children and to invest heavily in their children in the form of breastfeeding for at least a year, giving them premium healthcare plans, sending them to private schools, and letting them eat organic foods. Among those who send their children to public schools, they favor policies that ensure the high quality of such schools with exclusionary admissions and zoning ordinances.

Said parents also hire nannies and housekeepers to reduce the time they spend doing house chores so that they can more time on culturally and educationally enriching activities with their children. The amount of time parents spend with their children has gone up since the mid-1960s, especially among educated couples. An early start to the accumulation of cultural capital helps children stand out from the competition as they mature, making them more likely to be admitted to prestigious universities.

On the other hand, Generation Z typically grows up with less independence than the Baby Boomers or Generation X. This constant supervision of children by their parents—protective or "helicopter parenting"—is partly due to concerns over public safety or legal requirements and partly due to the fact that many educators and parents view play as outdated and irrelevant. As a result, a portion of this cohort spends much of their leisure in doors rather than outside, with little to no adult supervision.

In reality, the United States has become a safer place for children, who are much less likely to be abducted or otherwise harmed by an adult than ever before. In 2018, the American Academy of Pediatrics released a statement emphasizing the importance of unstructured time spent by children pointing to the benefits for children's social, cognitive, and language skills development. Play can also help children handle stress, including toxic stress, and reduce their chances of being obese or depressed.

=== Time-spending habits and leisure ===
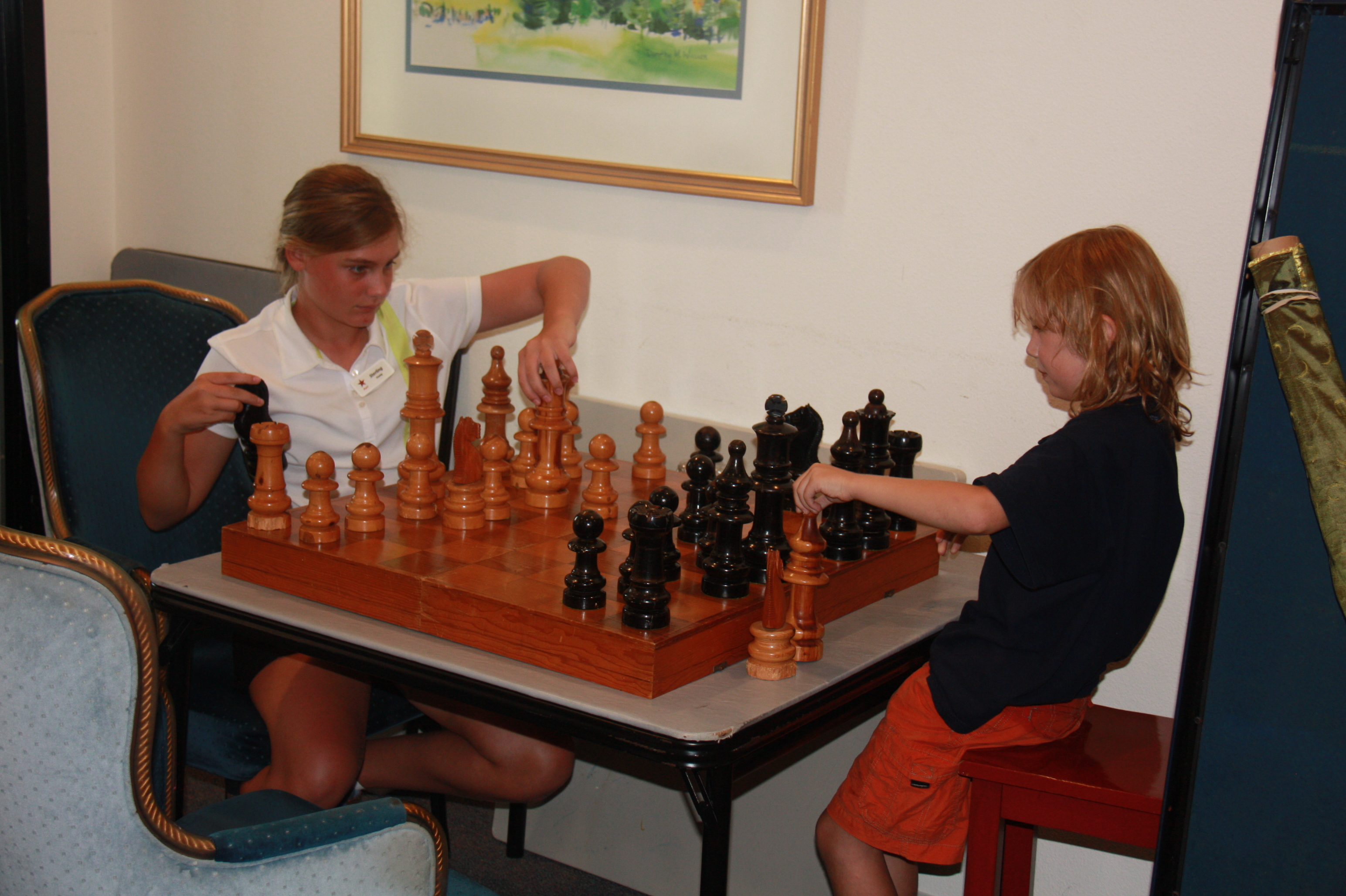
Two children playing chess at a summer camp, 2015

According to the Pew Research Center, American teenagers of the 2010s on average spent more time doing homework and sleeping compared to their counterparts from the previous decade. Other surveys suggest teens get fewer hours of sleep each day. They also spent less time at paid jobs and on socializing. Meanwhile, the amount of time spent on sports, clothes shopping, and volitional reading have not changed.

There were differences in how teenage boys and girls spent their free time. Boys generally spent more time on leisure activities, such as playing sports and on their electronic devices, whereas girls spent more time on homework, housework, and activities related to appearance. Girls also spent more time on volunteering and on unpaid care work than boys. Pluralities of both sexes said they felt pressured to look good, especially girls. In general, Generation Z is less likely to engage in "fringe" behavior.

Generation Z tends to be lonelier than ever before. A study of social interaction among American teenagers found that the amount of time young people spent with their friends had been trending downwards since the 1970s but has fallen sharply after 2010. Teenagers of the 2010s attended parties less often compared to their counterparts in the 1980s. Despite the technological proficiency they possess, 72% generally prefer person-to-person contact as opposed to online interaction. The desire for in-person interactions has fueled the revival of board games such as backgammon, chess, and mahjong among Millennials and Generation Z.

=== Romance, marriage, and family ===
A press release by the online dating app Tinder showed that the age group 18 to 24 became the majority of users on their platform in 2019. The company boasted 7.86 million users in the United States that year. Nevertheless, even though smartphone applications such as Tinder allow for easy hook-ups and one-night stands, Millennials and Generation Z are quite serious and cautious when it comes to long-term romantic relationships. Unlike generations past, who married earlier and after shorter periods of courtship, Generation Z generally prefers to take things slowly.

Generation Z, especially women, is also more likely to have been friends with a romantic partner before dating. Daniel Cox of Five Thirty Eight explains, "This suggests a significant push back [among young Americans] against online dating as a way to meet partners." Most members of this cohort prefer monogamy. However, a significant number is choosing to remain single, because they do not want to be in a relationship, are facing trouble meeting the right people, or have other priorities at present, such as (higher) education or careers.

Data from the 2019 General Social Survey revealed that 51% of Americans aged 18 to 24 had no steady partner, higher than other cohorts. This number has grown in recent years. Men below the age of 30 are much more likely to be single than women in the same age group.

Although a majority of Millennials and Generation Z would like to get married one day, two fifths deem marriage to be an outdated institution and an overwhelming majority think it is unnecessary for a fulfilling or happy life. They generally prefer an equitable partnership to a traditional patriarchal arrangement. For Zoomers who choose to get married, close to half skip the ceremony altogether. Surveys have also documented a marked decline in the desire for children. Close to a quarter of Millennials and Generation Z say they do not want children. Many of them are seeking to be sterilization procedures (vasectomies for men and tubal ligation for women), an uptick most pronounced in politically conservative states, where abortion, and even contraception and sterilization, could be restricted or banned following the Supreme Court decision Dobbs v. Jackson (2022).

Some have chosen to have pets in lieu of children, and they frequently refer to these animals as members of their families or their own children ("fur babies"). Generation Z prefer to prioritize professional life and individual self-discovery, are concerned with financial constraints driven by high inflation and taxes, and dislike the perceived constraints of family life. Those who wish to be parents want to achieve financial security and to be in a serious relationship first.

=== Sexual orientation and gender identity ===
In February 2021, Gallup reported that 15.9% of American adults born between 1997 and 2002 identified as LGBT. Of those, 11.5% were bisexual while 2% said they were lesbian, gay, or transgender. Overall, a greater share American adults in Generation Z identifies as LGBT than those in previous generational cohorts.

PRRI reported that up to 28% of Zoomers in America said they belonged to the LGBTQ community, significantly more than the 16% of Millennials and 7% of previous generations. Among Zoomer adults in the United States between the ages of 18 and 25, 72% identified as heterosexual, 15% as bisexual, 5% as gay or lesbian, and 8% as "other".

== Use of information and communications technologies (ICT) ==
=== Use of ICT in general ===
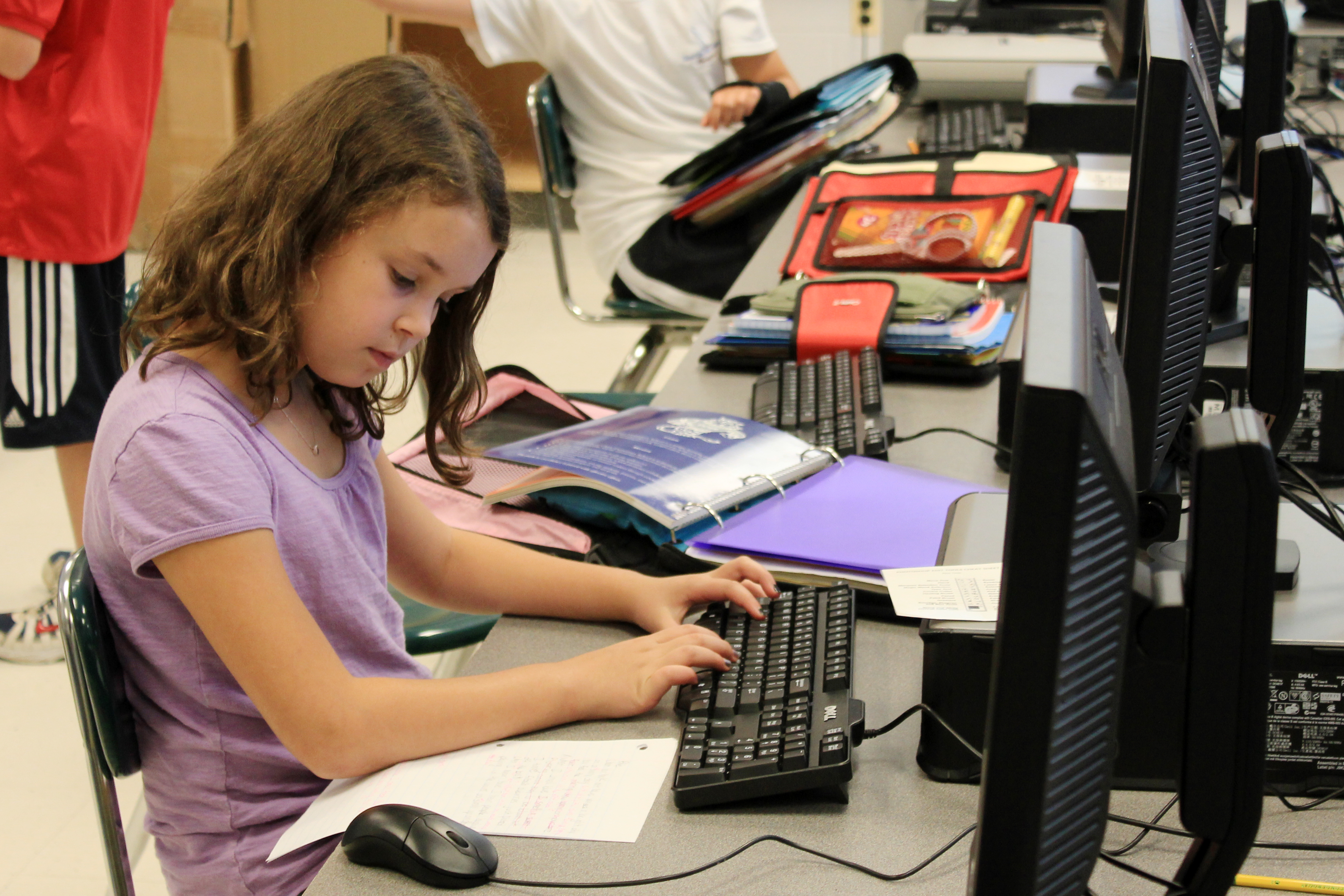
A girl using a computer to complete an assignment (2010)

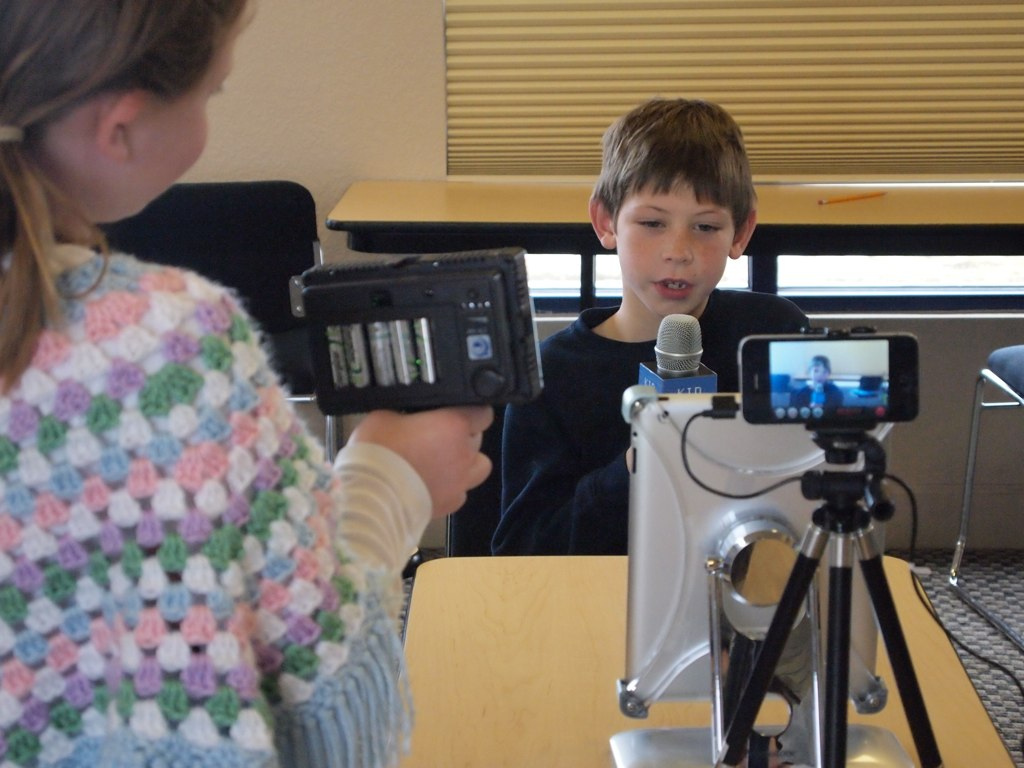
Schoolchildren making a video (2012)

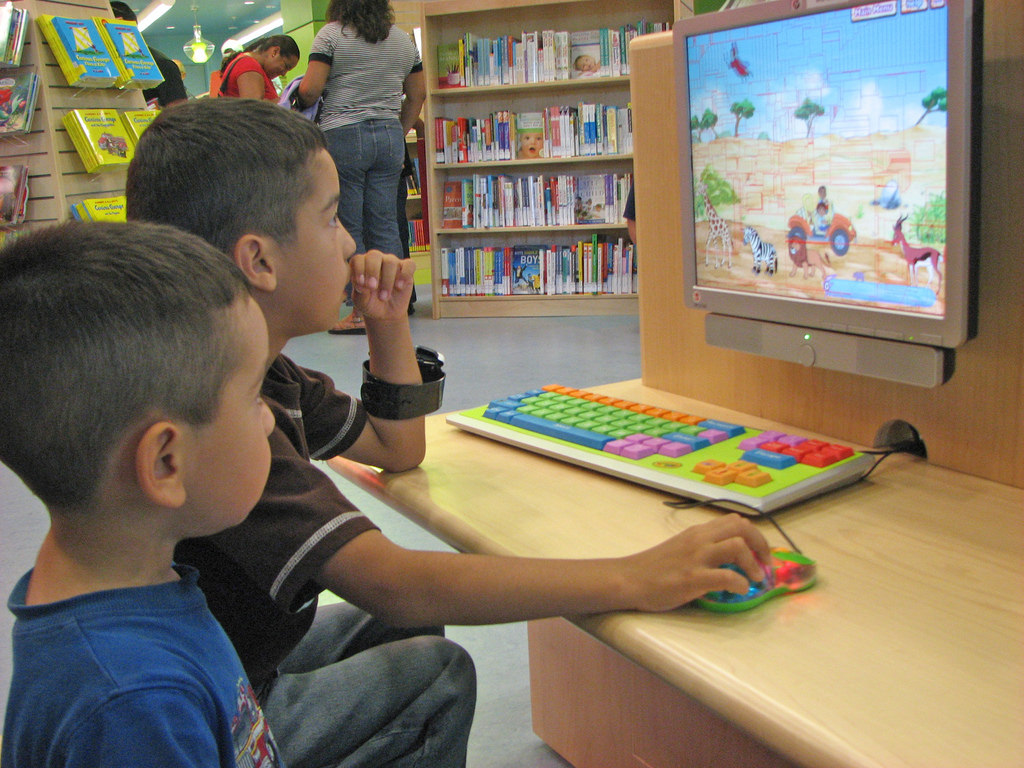
Two boys playing a computer game at a public library (2018)

Members of Generation Z have acquired a "digital bond to the Internet" from a very young age. According to the Pew Research Center, a defining feature of this cohort is that the majority owns a cell phone. About one quarter of teens are almost constantly online and 80% feel distressed if separated from their electronic gadgets. Generation Z spends on average six hours each day on the Internet, much of it playing video games. That much of Generation Z is growing up with constant access to Internet-enabled devices has undermined parental authority and control, prompting concerns over the sort of information children are exposed to while surfing the World Wide Web.

=== Digital literacy ===
Despite being commonly known as "digital natives", Generation Z is not necessarily digitally literate. The 2018 International Computer and Information Literacy Study (ICILS), conducted on 42,000 eighth-graders (or equivalents) from 14 countries, found that only two percent were sufficiently proficient with information devices to justify that description, and only 19% could work independently with computers to gather information and manage their work. In the U.S., 90% reached Level 1, 66% Level 2, 25% Level 3, and 2% Level 4. Among American eighth-graders, 72% said they searched for information on the Internet at least once a week or every school day, and 65% reported they were autodidactic information finders on the Internet.

The role of Generation Z in the future "digital economy" remains uncertain as they still lack the skills they need to join the workforce. At least initially, they struggle with office items such as printers or scanners. Many are also unfamiliar with touch typing.

=== Use of social media networks ===
Almost all Americans who were in their teens and 20s during the late 2010s and early 2020s are on at least one social-media platform. YouTube was the most popular in 2024, followed by TikTok, Instagram, and Snapchat. Meanwhile, Facebook and Twitter have lost grounds among teenagers compared to the 2010s. About three quarters checked their accounts multiple times a day. Members of Generation Z are more likely to "follow" others on social media than "share" and use different types of social media for different purposes.

Very few expressed concern about third parties being able to access their data as they share more personal information more often compared to previous generations. Most have uploaded photographs of themselves, stated their interests, given their school names, posted their locations, and revealed their relationship statuses. As a cohort, Generation Z finds validation and social support on social media, where they develop their own individual identities. On the other hand, only a minority engaged in political conversations on social media networks. Despite their heavy usage of social media, a majority believe that life was better before the emergence of these platforms.

Map current as of March 2024. As of April 2024, more than 30 states have banned the use of TikTok on government devices, including some university computer Wifi networks, though students can still use their own devices and data plans. Ban enacted No ban

While teens may dislike certain aspects of Facebook, such as excessive sharing, they continue to use it because participation is important in terms of socializing with peers. Teens typically keep their Facebook accounts private and make their Twitter accounts public, partly because of the number of adults on the former. Speed and reliability are important factors in choice of social networking platform. This need for quick communication is apparent in the popularity of apps like Vine (Note: This service is no longer operational.) or Snapchat and the prevalent use of emojis.

By the early 2020s, TikTok has become one of the most popular social networks among teenagers and young adults, who frequently use it as a news source and a search engine. Young Americans are willing to ignore their own government's concerns over issues of user privacy and national security, as well as a possible nationwide ban.

A notable number of people from Generation Z are the subject of their parents' social media posts. As they grow older, they have opinions about pictures or videos of them being posted online. While some parents do ask for their children's permission before posting, at least some of the time, others simply disregard what their children think. A 2010 report by cybersecurity firm AVG stated that an absolute majority of American children under the age of two had a digital footprint and one in three had their information and photographs posted online within weeks after they were born. One of the reasons why children want greater control over their image online is because a college admissions officer or a prospective recruiter might look them up online.

As a result, members of Generation Z are careful to make themselves presentable to potential employers on social media. Not only do they take advantage of the various tools that allow them to control who sees what and are more cautious about what they post, they also try to cultivate a "personal brand" online. According to the Pew Research Center, a majority refrain from posting something if they think it might "reflect badly on them in the future." It is quite common for young people to have an alternate Instagram account, "finstas" (fake Instagram accounts).

There are growing concerns and evidence on the negative impact of social media networks on youth mental health, because these platforms can be addictive; and can expose them to inappropriate contents, cyberbullying, slut-shaming, and body shaming. Youth who spend more time on social media tend to have worse body-image issues, a problem especially serious among Instagram users. Some psychologists are also worried that young people are politically radicalized by what they see online and help spread incendiary statements or misinformation.

== See also ==
- Gen-Z for Change
- Voters of Tomorrow
- Post-90s Generation and Little Emperor Syndrome (China)
- Strawberry Generation (Taiwan)
- 9X Generation (Vietnam)
- List of generations
- Generation gap
- Cusper
