= Great Wealth Transfer =

Economic trend

Over time, wealth passes from generation to generation. In 2024, the Silent Generation and baby boomers represented 25% of the population, but held 65% of all wealth in the US.

The Great Wealth Transfer is an intergenerational wealth transfer that is underway in the United States, among other nations, with the baby boomer generation leaving significant wealth to their heirs. Baby boomers and the Silent Generation will bequeath a total of $84.4 trillion in assets through to 2045, with $72.6 trillion going directly to heirs. The transfer of wealth from baby boomers will account for $53 trillion or 63% of all transfers, while the Silent Generation will hand down $15.8 trillion.

== Background and description ==
Inheritance has become more common among households, with 60% of surveyed households in 2022 having received, expecting to receive, or planning to leave inheritances. Wealthy individuals make up 1.5% of all households but constitute 42% of the expected transfers through 2045, approximately $35.8 trillion. The wealthiest 10% of households will give and receive the vast majority of the wealth, with the top 1% holding about as much wealth as the bottom 90%.

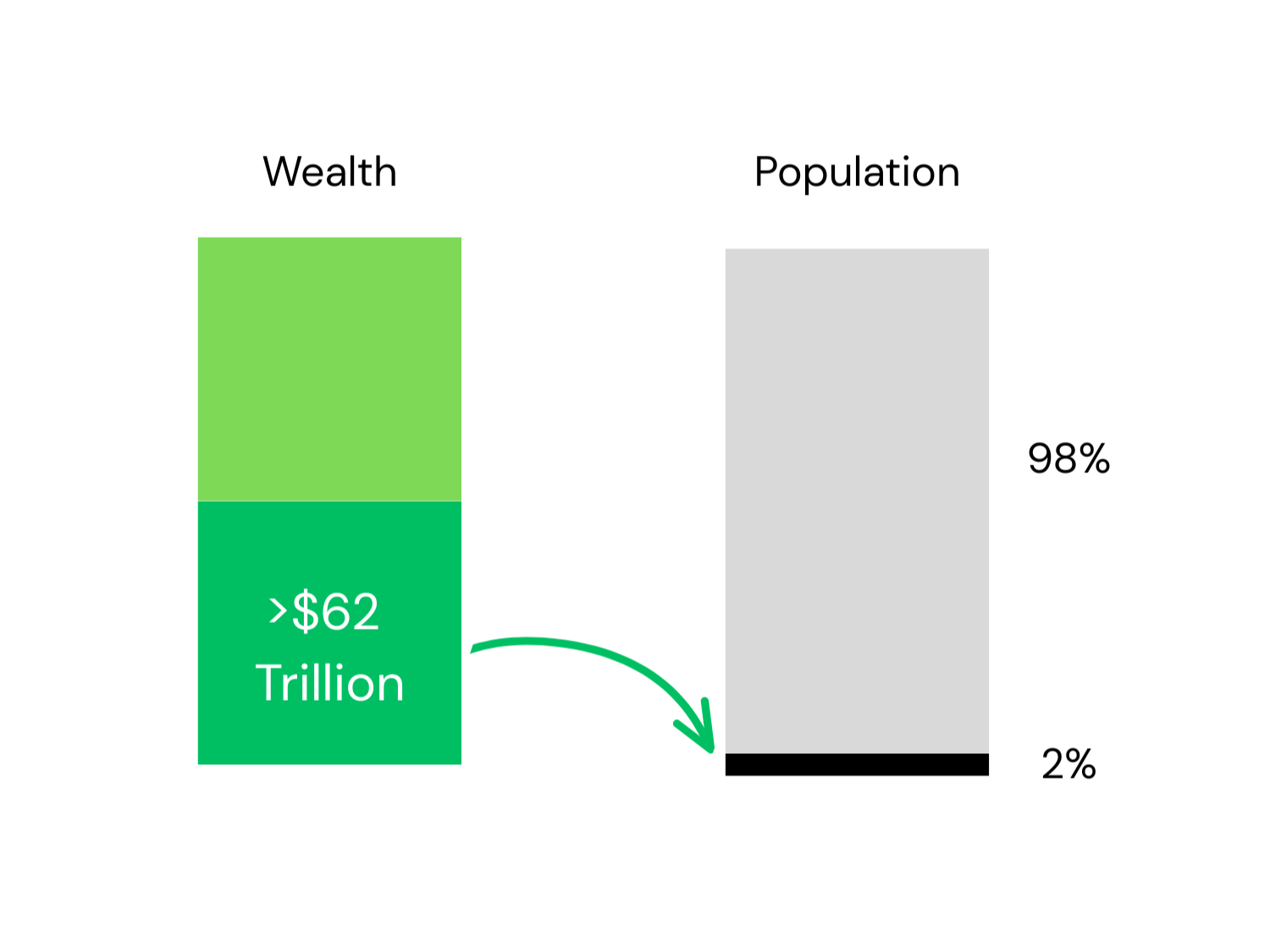
According to Cerulli Associates, over half of the wealth during the transfer will come from the top 2% of households. Some experts are skeptical that the remaining transfer will trickle down to the typical Millennial and Zoomer.

== Influencing factors ==
The transfer of wealth is influenced by factors such as price growth in real estate and financial assets, housing discrimination, and lack of access to financial tools for people of color. The US tax code, which allows individuals to transmit large sums without federal estate tax, contributes to the enormous scale of the transfer.

== Economic implications ==
The unintended consequences of the wealth transfer will impact various aspects of the economy, including: housing, education, healthcare, financial markets, labor markets, and politics. For example, the younger generation often prioritizes social and environmental issues, and their assets may be shifted to those issues accordingly.

== Challenges and considerations ==
While some individuals will benefit from the transfer, others will face challenges, such as the sandwich generation dealing with the costs of caring for aging parents and children simultaneously. The self-financing gap is a concern, with many workers facing insufficient retirement savings and being financially unprepared to retire. Some journalists or columnists at The New York Times (who are not Certified Public Accountants) argue for tax reform and addressing wealth disparities to ensure social stability and economic growth. Some say considerations should be made regarding life expectancy, as people are living longer, and financial plans should account for potential longer lifespans. Open discussions about family legacy and financial literacy/education play a significant role in preparing the next generation to responsibly handle inherited wealth. Tax planning tools such as trusts and gifting may assist households with no prior experience with inheritances to protect and maximize the use of their assets.

== See also ==
- Wealth inequality in the United States
