= Niyi =

- Gender: Male
- Language: Yoruba

Origin
- Meaning: "honour, prestige, fame"

Niyi is a masculine given name. Niyi means "honour, prestige, fame"Notable people with the name include:

- Niyi Adebayo (born 1958), Nigerian politician and lawyer
- Niyi Adeolokun (born 1990), Irish rugby union player
- Niyi Akinmolayan (born 1982), Nigerian filmmaker, director and media consultant
- Niyi Makanjuola (born 1980), Nigerian businessman
- Niyi Ogunlana (born 1984), Nigerian footballer
- Niyi Ojuolape (born 1970), Nigerian diplomat
- Niyi Osundare (born 1947), Nigerian writer
- Niyi Towolawi, British film director

== See also ==
- Niyi (rapper)
