= Demographic economics =

Application of economic analysis to demography

Demographic economics or population economics is the application of economic analysis to demography, the study of human populations, including size, growth, density, distribution, and vital statistics.

== Aspects ==
Aspects of the subject include:

- marriage and fertility
- the family
- divorce
- morbidity and life expectancy/mortality
- dependency ratios
- migration
- population growth
- population size
- public policy
- the demographic transition from "population explosion" to (dynamic) stability or decline.

Other subfields include measuring value of life and the economics of the elderly and the handicapped and of gender, race, minorities, and non-labor discrimination. In coverage and subfields, it complements labor economics and implicates a variety of other economics subjects.

== Subareas ==
The Journal of Economic Literature classification codes are a way of categorizing subjects in economics. There, demographic economics is paired with labour economics as one of 19 primary classifications at JEL: J. It has eight subareas:

General
Demographic Trends and Forecasts
Marriage; Marital Dissolution; Family Structure
Fertility; Family Planning; Child Care; Children; Youth
Economics of the Elderly; Economics of the Handicapped
Economics of Minorities and Races; Non-labor Discrimination
Economics of Gender; Non-labor Discrimination
Value of life; Foregone Income
Public Policy

== See also ==
- Cost of raising a child
- Family economics
- Generational accounting
- Growth economics
- Retirement age, international comparison

Related:

- Income and fertility
- Demographic dividend
- Demographic transition
- Demographic gift
- Demographic window
- Demographic trap
- Preston curve
- Development economics

== Journals ==
- Demography – Scope and links to issue contents & abstracts.
- Journal of Population Economics – Aims and scope and 20th Anniversary statement, 2006.
- Population and Development Review – Aims and abstract & supplement links.
- Population Bulletin – Each issue on a current population topic.
- Population Studies —Aims and scope.
- Review of Economics of the Household
