= Ogunlana =

Ògúnlànà
- Gender: Male
- Language: Yoruba

Origin
- Origin: Nigerian
- Meaning: Ògún cleared the path/paved the way.
- Region of origin: South West, Nigeria

Ògúnlànà is a Nigerian given name and a surname. It is a male name and of Yoruba origin, which means "Ògún cleared the path/paved the way". Ògún is the Yorùbá god of iron. The name Ògúnlànà is a culturally significant name and commonly used among some families in Ibadan of Ògún devotees. The diminutive form is Lanà which in Yoruba means "clear path".

== Notable individuals with the name ==
- F. O. Ogunlana, Nigerian treasurer
- Niyi Ogunlana (born 1984), Nigerian footballer
