= Avivah Wittenberg-Cox =

Canadian academic and author

- Born: Canada
- Occupations: Author, teacher, businesswoman
- Website: Avivah Wittenberg-Cox

Avivah Wittenberg-Cox is a writer on 20th- and 21st-century demographic trends and their implications for society, organisations and individuals. She is known for her work on gender balance in the workplace and on the impact of longer active lives.

== Early life and education ==
Wittenberg-Cox was born and raised in Canada to holocaust-survivor parents and holds Canadian, Swiss and French citizenship. She studied Computer science and Comparative Literature at the University of Toronto. She moved to Paris and completed an MBA from INSEAD.

In 2022, Wittenberg-Cox was an Advanced Leadership Initiative Fellow at Harvard researching on how changing demographics affect countries, companies, careers, and couples.

== Career ==
Wittenberg-Cox's early work was as a career coach for women working in Europe, where she led the Paris Professional Women's Network. She is known for her work tracking and advocating for a balance of men and women on the executive teams of large businesses. She addresses questions regarding work-life balance in the workplace, and advocates for gender-balanced teams. She has also written about changes in relationships as people age.

As of 2024, Wittenberg-Cox is the CEO of 20-first, a global consulting firm. She is also known for her work on longevity leadership.

== Selected publications ==
- Wittenberg-Cox, Avivah; Maitland, Alison (March 10, 2008). Why Women Mean Business. Chichester: Jossey-Bass. ISBN 978-0-470-72508-5.
- Wittenberg-Cox, Avivah (2018). Late Love: Mating in Maturity. Motivational Press.
- Wittenberg-Cox, Avivah (June 22, 2009). "Diverse and decisive". Financial Times.
- Wittenberg-Cox, Avivah (May 24, 2010). How Women Mean Business. Chichester: John Wiley & Sons. ISBN 978-0-470-68884-7. OCLC 489007715.
- Wittenberg-Cox, Avivah (November 17, 2015). "Gender at Work Is Not a Women's Issue". Harvard Business Review. ISSN 0017-8012.
- Wittenberg-Cox, Avivah (2016). Four Phases of Women's Careers. 20-First Publishers. ISBN 978-0-9935463-0-3.
