= Niyi Ojuolape =

United Nations official

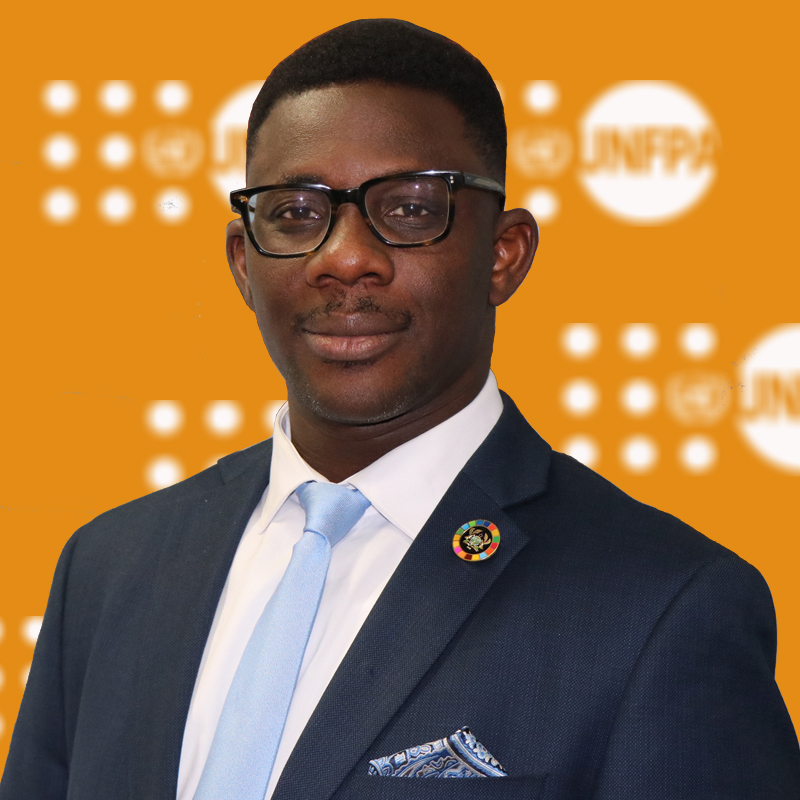

Former United Nations Population Fund Country Representative to Somalia
- In office May 2022 – 14 November 2024

United Nations Population Fund’s Country Representative to Ghana (July 2017 - May 2022)

Personal details
- Born: 31 October 1970 (age 56) Akure, Nigeria
- Education: Bocconi University; University of Calabar

Niyi Ojuolape (born Edward Adeniyi Ojuolape) is a Nigerian diplomat and international development consultant. He was the United Nations Population Fund’s Country Representative to Somalia between 2022 and 2024, and previously served as UNFPA’s envoy to Ghana between July 2017 and May 2022. In November 2024, he resigned in disgrace from UNFPA after being charged with misconduct.

== Early life and education ==
Ojuolape was born in Akure, Ondo State, Nigeria. His father, Justice Edward Ojuolape, is a retired High Court judge of the Federal Republic of Nigeria. Ojuolape holds a Master of Science degree in finance from the University of Calabar and a banking and finance degree from Ondo State University in Nigeria. Ojuolape also holds a master's degree from Bocconi University Italy in the Management of International Organizations and was named the valedictorian of the 2019 class.

== Early career ==
Ojuolape held the position of chief programme officer of donor coordination for the National Agency for the Control of AIDS (NACA) in Nigeria, where he coordinated the communications, donor activities and the development of resource mobilisation strategies that led to an increase of $150 million in funding for the agency's portfolio over a five-year period. He has also worked as the special assistant to the Minister of Health in Nigeria – Late Babatunde Osotimehin. He played an integral role in the success of the Ministry of Health's supervision of approximately 4000 staff members and a budget of about $1.2 billion. He also worked on several World Bank funded projects between 2002 and 2005.

== United Nations Population Fund ==
Ojuolape served as the country representative for UNFPA Ghana between 2017 and 2022. He also served as UNFPA's Chief of Staff at the Headquarters in New York and before that, as the Special Assistant to the Executive Director, Babatunde Osotimehin. He also served as the Deputy Representative of UNFPA in the Democratic Republic of Congo, liaising with political influencers within government, colleagues and Development Partners for the initiation of the landmark advocacy on Demographic Dividend.

As the UNFPA Country Representative in Ghana, he initiated several youth-centric and gender-inclusive programmes. Of note is the Youth Leaders (YoLe) Fellowship Programme which is partly implemented by Impact Hub Accra. The programme selects 16 graduates from Ghanaian tertiary institutions annually following rigorous screening, to intern at the UNFPA Ghana country office where they develop several skills ranging from: innovation, youth and gender advocacy and community development. Consequent on this, he led the completion of a youth innovation hub named ‘The Orange Loft’, and which was commissioned in June 2019 by Natalia Kanem, Executive Director of United Nations Population Fund.

Ojuolape is a member of the Advisory Board of the Coalition of People against Sexual and Gender Based Violence and Harmful Practices (CoPASH), a joint initiative of the Second Lady of the Republic of Ghana, Samira Bawumia and UNFPA Ghana. He has leveraged on the relevant public institutions like the Domestic Violence and Victims Support Unit (DOVVSU) and faith-based organisations to increase awareness about GBV in Ghana and build capacity for improved response.

Ojuolape was appointed as the UNFPA resident representative in Somalia in May 2022. His credentials were officially received by Acting Foreign Minister and State Minister for Foreign Affairs and International Cooperation Balal Mohamed Osman on 20 June 2022, marking the start of his tenure in Somalia. He mainstreamed youth issues, zero gender-based violence, and comprehensive sexuality education (CSE), as core strands of the organisation.

In November 2026, the United Nations Dispute Tribunal upheld the assessment of UNFPA that Ojuolape had committed misconduct by willfully and repeatedly defrauding the organisation.
