= Makanjuola =

Makanjuola is a surname. Notable people with the surname include:

- Bisola Makanjuola (born 1996), Nigerian freestyle wrestler
- Moji Makanjuola (borm 1968), Nigerian journalist and broadcaster
- Niyi Makanjuola (born 1980), Nigerian businessman
- Olumide Makanjuola, Nigerian sexual and human right activist
