= Neolithic demographic transition =

Prehistoric rapid population growth

The Neolithic demographic transition was a period of rapid population growth following the adoption of agriculture by prehistoric societies (the Neolithic Revolution). It was a demographic transition caused by an abrupt increase in birth rates due to the increased food supply and decreased mobility of farmers compared to foragers. Eventually the mortality rate in farming societies also increased to the point where the population stabilised again, possibly because settling down in one place, in close proximity to animals, encouraged the spread of zoonotic and waterborne diseases. The transition is estimated to have taken about a thousand years on average, although the onset and duration of the transition varied widely in the different parts of the world.

Evidence for the Neolithic demographic transition include an increase in juvenile skeletons in prehistoric cemeteries and a general increase in the density of archaeological remains following the start of the Neolithic. It is known to have occurred in Southwest Asia (c. 9500–6500 BCE), Europe (c. 7000 BCE), East Asia (c. 6000–2500 BCE), Southeast Asia (c. 2500–1500 BCE), and the American Southwest (c. 1100 BCE – 1000 CE).

The Neolithic demographic transition was the inverse of the contemporary demographic transition, a similar episode of population growth that occurred after the Industrial Revolution, which began because of decreased mortality and ended due to decreased fertility.

== See also ==
- Prehistoric demography
