= Reer Diini =

Somali Sub-clan

Languages
- Somali, Arabic

Religion
- Islam

Related ethnic groups
- Hawrarsame, Reer Hassan, and other Marehan Sub-clans.

Reer Diini is a Marehan sub-clan. Ughaz Diini, which the namesake is attributed to, is said to have lived from the late 1700s to the early 1800s. The Reer Diini Clan primarily inhabits; Abudwak and Balanballe >Xaaji Yare in the Galgudud region (including settlements just west of the unrecognized border), Cities in the Gedo region such as Bardhere, Garbaharey and Burdhubo and also Kismayo in the lower Jubba region.

== Clan tree ==
- Ughaz Diini Farah (Reer Diini)
  - Bah Xawaadle
    - Reer Ugaas Sharmake ugaas Diini
    - Reer Siyaad ugaas Diini
    - Reer Warsame
  - Bah Ogaaden
    - Dalal Ugas
    - Hirsi Ugas
    - Mahamud Guleid Ugas
  - Bah darandooley
    - Reer Kooshin
    - Reer Nuur
    - Reer Warfaa Diini
    - Reer Shirwac Diini
    - Reer Maxmuud Diini
    - Reer Faarax Diin
  - Bah dhulbahante
    - Reer allamagan diini
    - Reer Qaliif Diini ( Qaliif Gawracane )

== Notable Figures ==
- Fatima Isaak Bihi, The First Somali female Ambassador to Geneva, Director of the African Department of the Ministry of Foreign Affairs.
- Mohamed Aden Sheikh, Premier Somali intellectual, Former head of Somali Technological Development, Medical doctor and Former Ministry of Health, Education and Information, Former Head of the Ideology Bureau SRRC.
- Ahmed Warsame, Former Head of the Somali Military Academy.
- Balal Mohamed Osman, Is a Somali politician and diplomat who served as Somali special envoy to the Horn of Africa, Red Sea and Gulf of Aden Affairs.
- Abdulahi Sheik Ismael Fara-Tag, Member of sen of the upper house in Somalia, Former Vice President Of Jubaland State of Somalia and Former head of the Juba Valley Alliance.
- Mohamed Siad bare, Third president of Somalia
- Abdiwahid Gonjeh, Former Prime Minister of Somalia.
- Ahmed Mohamed Afi, former Senior Political Advisor to the President of Somalia, Former Director of Policy and Planning at Villa Somalia, helped in stabilization and state building in Galmudug.
- Abdiweli Sheikh Ahmed, 17th Prime Minister of Somalia, Economist and Politician.
- Mohamed Hashi Abdi, Former Vice President of the Galmudug State.
- Mohamed Abdullahi Farmaajo, 9th President of Somalia, Founder Nabad iyo Nolol party And Tayo party, Former Prime minister of Somalia.
- Ahmed Abdullahi Gulleid, A columnist, writer and researcher.
- Farah Hussein Sharmarke, a philosopher and poet.
- Mohamud Ali Magan, Former Minister of Planning, Former Consul General to United States of America and Canada.
- Abdulkadir Sheikh Dini, Former Minister of Defence of Somalia.
- Abdi Farah Shirdon, 16th Prime Minister of Somalia.
- Abdirahman Jama Barre, The first Deputy Prime Minister, twice served as the Minister of Foreign Affairs of Somalia, and later as the Minister of Finance.
- Aden Ibrahim Aw Hirsi, An author and politician – helped with the planning of the Jubaland State and is the current Minister of State for Environment & Climate Change of Somalia.
- Abdullahi Anod, Former Head Commander of the Somali Military Forces.
- Colonel Barre Adan Shire Hiiraale, Former Minister of Defence of Somalia, head of the Jubba Valley Alliance.
- Abdulrahman Yussuf Diriye (Indhabuur Sayuun), former Moyer of Afgoye Somalia, The Minister of Housing and Family Affairs 10 years Member of Somalia federal Government.
- Ahmed 'Idaaja'' Farah Ali, a Somali literary scholar and publisher of written folklore.
- Abdulkadir 'Yamyam'' Hersi Siyad was a Somali poet and playwright.
- Ali Matan Hashi, First Somali pilot and Commander of the Somali Air Force between 1959 and 1978.

== See also ==
- Darood
- Marehan
- Majeerten
- Warsangali
- leelkase
- Awrtable
- Dhulbahnte
