= Dick van de Kaa =

Dutch demographer (1933–2026)

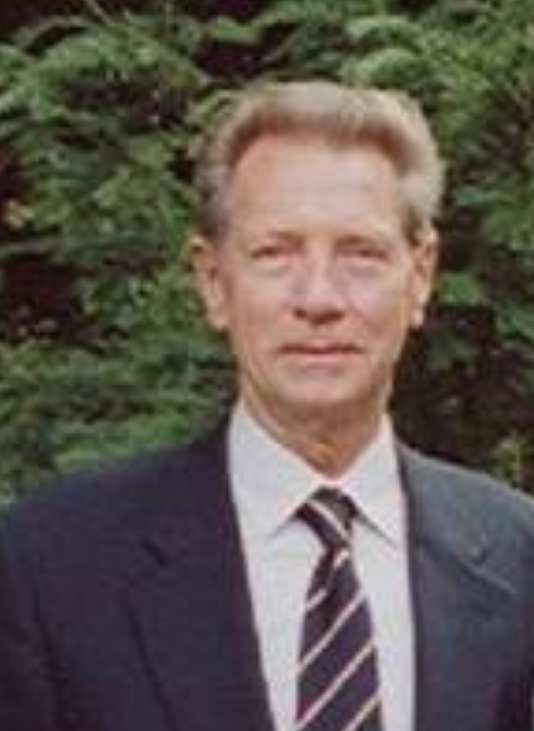
- Van de Kaa in 2002
- Born: Dirk Jan van de Kaa; 5 January 1933; Scherpenzeel, Netherlands
- Died: 22 May 2026 (aged 93); The Hague, Netherlands
- Occupation: Demographer

Academic background
- Education: Utrecht University, Australian National University
- Thesis: The demography of Papua and New Guinea's indigenous population (1971)

Dirk Jan "Dick" van de Kaa (5 January 1933 – 22 May 2026) was a Dutch demographer. From 1970 to 1987 he was the first director of the Netherlands Interdisciplinary Demographic Institute. From 1987 to 1995 he was director and rector of the Netherlands Institute for Advanced Study. Van de Kaa was professor of demography at the University of Amsterdam between 1978 and 1998.

== Life and career ==
Van de Kaa was born in Scherpenzeel on 5 January 1933. His father was a mailman while his mother was a housewife. After attending primary school during World War II he attended the Hogere Burgerschool in Amersfoort. Van de Kaa obtained a degree in social geography at Utrecht University in 1959. After obtaining his degree he had to perform military service and was sent for training to become an officer in the Netherlands Marine Corps. He was subsequently sent to Netherlands New Guinea as a second lieutenant. After having served for only a couple of months van de Kaa was asked to return to the Netherlands and leave military service to help assist in setting up a demographic survey of Netherlands New Guinea. By February 1961 he was back in Netherlands New Guinea. When in 1962 the terroritory was handed over to Indonesia the field work of the survey had been done. Between 1963 and 1966 van de Kaa made several publications based on the material.

In 1966 van de Kaa was asked by the Australian National University to become a researcher at their institution. He was asked to perform research on Papua New Guinea in a similar way he had done before in Netherlands New Guinea. He obtained his PhD in demography at the Australian National University in 1971 with a thesis titled: "The demography of Papua and New Guinea's indigenous population". In 1970 the Netherlands Interdisciplinary Demographic Institute (NIDI) was created and van de Kaa was asked to become its first director. During the 1970s he was scientific secretary of the State Commission Muntendam which dealt with population growth. In the late 1970s van de Kaa formulated the idea of a second demographic transition which leads to a sub-replacement fertility-level. He remained director of the NIDI until 1987. Van de Kaa subsequently served as director and rector of the Netherlands Institute for Advanced Study from 1987 to 1995.

From 1978 to 1987 he was part-time professor (Dutch: buitengewoon hoogleraar) of demography at the University of Amsterdam. Between 1987 and 1988 he was a regular professor. From 1988 to 1998 he was an unpaid regular professor. He was a professor of the Cleveringa chair (Dutch: bijzonder hoogleraar) at Leiden University from 1991 to 1992. He was vice president of the Netherlands Organisation for Scientific Research between 1988 and 1998. Van de Kaa was chairperson of the Sociaal Wetenschappelijke Raad of the Royal Netherlands Academy of Arts and Sciences between 1990 and 1996.

Van de Kaa was elected a member of the Royal Netherlands Academy of Arts and Sciences in 1976. He was elected a member of the Academia Europaea in 1989. In 1991 he was made a Knight of the Order of the Netherlands Lion. He was an honorary fellow of the Netherlands Interdisciplinary Demographic Institute. Van de Kaa served as member of council of Population Europe.

Van de Kaa died in The Hague on 22 May 2026, at the age of 93.
