= Demographic dividend =

Beneficial economic effect of a young and growing population

Demographic dividend, as defined by the United Nations Population Fund (UNFPA), is "the economic growth potential that can result from shifts in a population’s age structure, mainly when the share of the working-age population (15 to 64) is larger than the non-working-age share of the population (14 and younger, and 65 and older)". In other words, it is "a boost in economic productivity that occurs when there are growing numbers of people in the workforce relative to the number of dependents". UNFPA stated that "a country with both increasing numbers of young people and declining fertility has the potential to reap a demographic dividend."

Demographic dividend occurs when the proportion of working people in the total population is high, because this indicates that more people have the potential to be productive and contribute to growth of the economy.

Due to the dividend between young and old, many argue that there is great potential for economic gains, which has been termed the "demographic gift". In order for economic growth to occur, the younger population must have access to quality education, adequate nutrition and health including access to sexual and reproductive health.

However, this drop in fertility rates is not immediate. The lag in between produces a generational population bulge that surges through society. For a period of time, this "bulge" is a burden on society and increases the dependency ratio. Eventually, this group begins to enter the productive labor force. With fertility rates continuing to fall and older generations having longer life expectancies, the dependency ratio declines dramatically. This demographic shift initiates the demographic dividend. With fewer younger dependents, due to declining fertility and child mortality rates, and fewer older dependents, due to the older generations having shorter life expectancies, and the largest segment of the population of productive working age, the dependency ratio declines dramatically, leading to the demographic dividend. Combined with effective public policies, this time period of the demographic dividend can help facilitate more rapid economic growth and puts less strain on families. This is also a time period when many women enter the labor force for the first time. In many countries, this time period has led to increasingly smaller families, rising income, and rising life expectancy rates. However, dramatic social changes can also occur during this time, such as increasing divorce rates, postponement of marriage, and single-person households.

== Recent education dividend theory ==
Recent research shows that the demographic dividend is an education-triggered dividend.

== Statistical overview ==
Approximately 1.8 billion people between 10 and 24 years old exist in the world today; the highest total number of young people than ever before. According to the UN Population Fund (UNFPA), this number is expected to increase until 2070. Much of the increase has derived from the least developed countries who have experienced rapid and large growth in their youth populations. Within least developed countries’ populations roughly 60% are under 24 years old. The large proportion of young people in least developed countries creates an opportunity to realize a demographic dividend. However, this realization comes with challenges.

UNFPA stated that:

By the middle of this century, the population of the least developed countries will have doubled in size, adding 14 million young people to the working-age population each year. Creating conditions for decent livelihoods will be an enormous task, especially given that, currently, about 80 per cent of the people who work in these countries are unemployed, underemployed or irregularly employed. Additionally, the shortage of financial resources will make it difficult to maintain, let alone increase, spending on health, education and nutrition.

— UNFPA

Therefore, in order to reap the benefits of a demographic dividend, countries must recognize and cultivate the potential of young people and close the gap between the demands placed on young people and the opportunities provided to them.

== Examples ==
=== East Asia ===
East Asia provides some of the most compelling evidence to date of the demographic dividend. The demographic transition in East Asia occurred over 5–15 years during the 1950s and 1960s, a shorter time period than anywhere previously. During this time, East Asian countries invested in their youth and expanded access to family planning allowing people to start families later and have fewer children. More resources began to become available, investment in infrastructure began and productive investments were made as fertility rates fell resulting in unprecedented economic growth. For example, UNFPA stated that "The Republic of Korea, saw its per-capita gross domestic product grow about 2,200 per cent between 1950 and 2008 and Thailand’s GDP grew 970 per cent."

East Asia was able to benefit from knowledge, experience, and technology of other countries that had already passed through the demographic transition. It has been argued that the demographic dividend played a role in the "economic miracles" of the East Asian Tigers and accounts for between one fourth and two fifths of the "miracle".

=== Ireland ===
Ireland also provides a recent example of the demographic dividend and transition. Faced with a high birth rate, the Irish government legalized contraception in 1979. This policy led to a decline in the fertility rate and a decrease in the dependency ratio. It has been linked as a contributing factor to the economic boom of the 1990s that was called the Celtic Tiger. During this time the dependency ratio also improved as a result of increased female labor market participation and a reversal from outward migration of working age population to a net inflow.

=== Africa ===
Africa, on the other hand has been unique demographically because fertility rates have remained relatively high, even as significant progress has been made decreasing the mortality rates. This has led to a continuing population explosion rather than a population boom and has contributed to the economic stagnation in much of Sub-Saharan Africa. The magnitude of the demographic dividend appears to be dependent on the ability of the economy to absorb and productively employ the extra workers, rather than be a pure demographic gift. According to the UN Population Fund, "If sub-Saharan African countries are able to repeat the East Asian experience, the region could realize a demographic dividend amounting to as much as $500 billion a year for 30 years. For countries like Uganda in the Eastern Africa which is currently (2019) one of the least developed countries in the world may take quite a long period of time if there are no consistent efforts towards achieving the demographic dividend.

=== India ===
In near future India will be the largest individual contributor to the global demographic transition. A 2011 International Monetary Fund Working Paper found that substantial portion of the growth experienced by India since the 1980s is attributable to the country's age structure and changing demographics. By 2026 India's average age would be 29 which is least among the global average. The U.S. Census Bureau predicts that India will surpass China as the world's largest country by 2025, with a large proportion of those in the working age category. Over the next two decades the continuing demographic dividend in India could add about two percentage points per annum to India's per capita GDP growth. Extreme actions are needed to take care of future basic minimum living standards including food, water and energy. As per Population Reference Bureau India's population in 2050 is predicted to be 1.692 billion people.

=== West Asia ===
The West Asia and North Africa recently experienced a youth bulge in which 15- to 29-year-olds comprise around 30% of the total population. It is believed that, through educational and employment, the current youth population in the West Asia could fuel economic growth and developments as young East Asians were able to for the Asian Tigers.

== Four mechanisms for growth in the demographic dividend ==
During the course of the demographic dividend there are four mechanisms through which the benefits are delivered.

1. The first is the increased labor supply. However, the magnitude of this benefit appears to be dependent on the ability of the economy to absorb and productively employ the extra workers rather than be a pure demographic gift. There is an accompanying indirect effect, as fewer children (and more schooling, see below) allow higher levels of female labor force participation.
2. The second mechanism is the increase in savings. As the number of dependents decreases individuals can save more. This increase in national savings rates increases the stock of capital in developing countries already facing shortages of capital and leads to higher productivity as the accumulated capital is invested.
3. The third mechanism is human capital. Decreases in fertility rates result in healthier women and fewer economic pressures at home. This also allows parents to invest more resources per child, leading to better health and educational outcomes.
4. The fourth mechanism for growth is the increasing domestic demand brought about by the increasing GDP per capita and the decreasing dependency ratio. This includes a possible second-order effect as household production falls, to be replaced by external provision, such as meals away from home and the purchase of ready-made clothing.

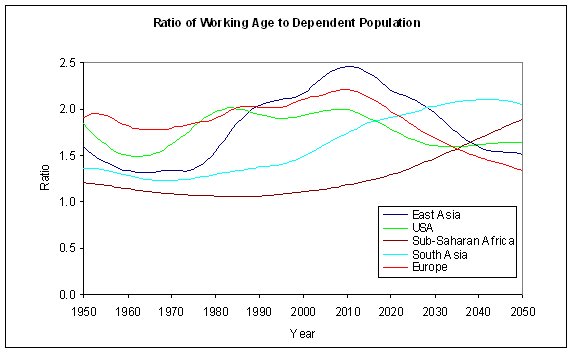

Low fertility initially leads to low youth dependency and a high ratio of working age to total population. However, as the relatively large working age cohort grows older, population aging sets in. The graph shows the ratio of working age to dependent population (those 15 to 64 years old, divided by those above or below this age range—the inverse of the dependency ratio) based on data and projections from the United Nations.

There is a strategic urgency to put in place policies which take advantage of the demographic dividend for most countries. This urgency stems from the relatively small window of opportunity countries have to plan for the demographic dividend when many in their population are still young, prior to entering the work force. During this short opportunity, countries traditionally try to promote investments which will help these young people be more productive during their working years. Failure to provide opportunities to the growing young population will result in rising unemployment and an increased risk of social upheaval.

== After the demographic dividend, demographic tax ==
The urgency to put in place appropriate policies is magnified by the reality that what follows the "demographic dividend" is a time when the dependency ratio begins to increase again. Inevitably the population bubble that made its way through the most productive working years creating the "demographic dividend" grows old and retires. With a disproportionate number of old people relying upon a smaller generation following behind them the "demographic dividend" becomes a liability. With each generation having fewer children, population growth slows, stops, or even goes into reverse. This trend may be deemed a demographic tax or demographic burden. This is currently seen most dramatically in Japan, with younger generations essentially abandoning many parts of the country. Other regions, notably Europe and North America, will face similar situations in the near future, with East Asia to follow after that.

China's dependency ratio has increased from 37 in 2011 to 45 in 2022. This represents the number of dependents, children, and people over 65 per 100 working adults. Compared to the current world average of 55, this is quite low. The historically lower dependency ratio had been extremely beneficial for China's unprecedented period of economic growth. The steady shift was brought about largely due to China's one-child policy. As a result, China is currently aging at an unprecedented rate. Combined with the sex-selective abortions widely practiced as a result of the one-child policy – China will have 96.5 million men in their 20s in 2025 but only 80.3 million young women. China's future demography is therefore, supposed to hold many challenges for the Chinese government. United States's dependency ratio is 54 as of 2022, though lower compared to world average, this is quite high.

== See also ==
- Demographic transition
- Demographic trap
- Demographic window
- Pensions crisis
