= List of countries by dependency ratio =

Dependency ratios are ratios of the numbers of dependents (youths aged 0–14 and/or elderly aged 65+) to the number of working-age adults (15–64). They serve as indicators of population age structures and social support requirements.

== Definitions ==
- The total dependency ratio is the number of youths and elderly per hundred working-age adults:

$\text{Total Dependency Ratio} = \frac{\text{Number aged 0 to 14} + \text{Number aged at least 65}}{\text{Number aged 15 to 64}} \times 100$.

- The youth dependency ratio is the number of youths per hundred working-age adults:

$\text{Youth Dependency Ratio} = \frac{\text{Number aged 0 to 14}}{\text{Number aged 15 to 64}} \times 100$.

- The elderly dependency ratio is the number of elderly per hundred working-age adults:

$\text{Elderly Dependency Ratio} = \frac{\text{Number aged at least 65}}{\text{Number aged 15 to 64}} \times 100$.

- The potential support ratio is the number of working-age adults per (one) elderly person:

$\text{Potential Support Ratio} = \frac{\text{Number aged 15 to 64}}{\text{Number aged at least 65}}$.

Note that the potential support ratio is $100$ times the reciprocal of the elderly dependency ratio (and not simply the reciprocal, as sometimes mistakenly claimed).

== List (2024) ==
All data are for 2024 (except the Falkland Islands, which are for 2021) and from CIA World Factbook. Notes:

- "China": "data do not include Hong Kong, Macau, and Taiwan"
- "Cyprus": "data represent the whole country"
- "Norway": "data include Svalbard and Jan Mayen Islands"
- "Ukraine": "data include Crimea".

Country	Dependency ratios			Potential support ratio
Country	Total	Children	Elderly	Potential support ratio
Qatar	17.1	15.4	1.7	57.2
United Arab Emirates	22.9	20.1	2.7	36.9
Somalia	100.9	97.6	3.2	30.8
Sierra Leone	74.3	69.9	4.4	22.6
Benin	91.4	86.7	4.7	21.1
Ivory Coast	73.6	68.8	4.7	21.1
South Sudan	80.8	76.1	4.7	21.1
Uganda	97.8	93	4.8	21
Democratic Republic of the Congo	93.2	88.4	4.8	20.7
Chad	93.6	88.7	4.9	20.6
Kuwait	36.2	31.4	4.9	20.6
Gaza Strip	71.6	66.6	4.9	20.2
Angola	96.1	91.1	5.1	19.8
Zambia	81.4	76.4	5.1	19.8
Rwanda	67.5	62.3	5.1	19.4
Afghanistan	82.7	77.5	5.2	19.3
São Tomé and Príncipe	65.8	60.4	5.4	18.6
Yemen	71.3	66	5.4	18.6
Kenya	65.3	59.8	5.5	18.3
Bahrain	28.8	23.3	5.5	18.2
Mozambique	90.7	85.2	5.5	18.2
Liberia	72.8	67.3	5.5	18
Niger	109.1	103.4	5.7	17.7
Guinea-Bissau	83.2	77.5	5.7	17.6
Sudan	76.4	70.7	5.7	17.5
Tanzania	82.5	76.8	5.7	17.5
Ethiopia	72.5	66.7	5.8	17.3
Burkina Faso	80.7	74.9	5.8	17.2
Cameroon	80.8	75	5.8	17.2
Iraq	62	56.1	5.9	16.9
Central African Republic	72.5	66.5	6	16.6
Nigeria	77.9	71.9	6	16.6
Oman	51	45	6.1	16.5
Saudi Arabia	37.5	31.5	6.1	16.5
Senegal	78.9	72.8	6.1	16.4
Burundi	83.9	77.7	6.2	16.2
Mali	99.5	93.4	6.2	16.2
Djibouti	48.4	42.1	6.3	16
Eswatini	55.4	49.2	6.2	16
Gambia	72.1	65.7	6.3	15.8
Namibia	61.4	55	6.4	15.7
Haiti	53.1	46.7	6.4	15.5
Jordan	54	47.6	6.5	15.4
West Bank	68.1	61.6	6.5	15.4
Tajikistan	68.8	62.2	6.6	15.2
Madagascar	69.3	62.7	6.6	15.1
Eritrea	65.8	59.1	6.7	15
Malawi	71.3	64.6	6.7	15
Syria	59.1	52.4	6.7	15
Nauru	51.5	44.8	6.7	14.9
Zimbabwe	73	66.3	6.8	14.8
Papua New Guinea	69.8	63	6.8	14.7
Mauritania	85.4	78.5	6.9	14.5
Gabon	63.7	56.7	7	14.2
Libya	58.3	51.1	7.2	13.9
Guinea	81.6	74.3	7.3	13.7
Comoros	59.2	51.8	7.4	13.6
Laos	53.7	46.3	7.4	13.5
Democratic Republic of the Congo	72.9	65.4	7.5	13.3
Ghana	71.8	64.2	7.6	13.2
Togo	75.4	67.8	7.6	13.2
Timor-Leste	63.8	56.1	7.7	13
Kiribati	47.3	39.4	7.9	12.7
Vanuatu	56.7	48.8	7.9	12.7
Cambodia	52.1	44	8.1	12.4
Pakistan	64.8	56.7	8.1	12.4
Solomon Islands	55.9	47.7	8.2	12.2
Belize	49.9	41.6	8.3	12
Equatorial Guinea	68.4	60	8.4	11.9
Federated States of Micronesia	48.6	40.2	8.5	11.8
Guatemala	58.3	49.8	8.5	11.7
Honduras	52.2	43.6	8.5	11.7
Maldives	39.8	31.3	8.6	11.7
Lesotho	59.6	51	8.6	11.6
Philippines	55.6	47	8.7	11.5
Turks and Caicos Islands	36.6	27.9	8.7	11.5
Nicaragua	45.1	36.4	8.7	11.4
Marshall Islands	55.6	46.7	8.9	11.2
Mongolia	59.1	50.2	8.9	11.2
Egypt	65	55.7	9.2	10.8
Botswana	53.5	44.1	9.3	10.7
Nepal	47.4	38.1	9.4	10.7
Bhutan	42.5	33	9.5	10.5
Cape Verde	48.8	39.2	9.5	10.5
India	45.5	35.6	9.9	10.1
Iran	43.3	33.3	10	10
Turkmenistan	45.8	35.6	10.1	9.9
Myanmar	45.9	35.6	10.3	9.7
Montserrat	31.3	20.8	10.5	9.5
Uzbekistan	57	46.5	10.5	9.5
Brunei	41.2	30.6	10.6	9.4
Suriname	42.9	32.1	10.8	9.3
Bolivia	55.1	44.2	10.8	9.2
Kyrgyzstan	56.3	45.5	10.8	9.2
Samoa	51.7	40.8	11	9.1
Algeria	60.6	49.4	11.1	9
Dominican Republic	49.6	38.2	11.4	8.8
Lebanon	50.3	39	11.3	8.8
South Africa	53.1	41.6	11.5	8.7
Bangladesh	49	37.4	11.6	8.6
Indonesia	46.5	34.8	11.6	8.6
Tonga	58.2	46.4	11.8	8.5
Guyana	46.3	34.3	11.9	8.4
Mexico	45.9	33.9	11.9	8.4
Peru	51	39	12	8.3
Tuvalu	58.3	46.2	12.1	8.3
Vietnam	45.9	33.8	12.1	8.3
Kosovo	45.1	33	12.1	8.2
Malaysia	44.2	32	12.1	8.2
Bahamas	42.9	30.6	12.3	8.1
El Salvador	47.6	35	12.5	8
Tokelau	52.7	40	12.6	7.9
Morocco	51.7	38.9	12.7	7.8
American Samoa	51.5	38.4	13.1	7.6
Azerbaijan	45.6	32.4	13.1	7.6
Fiji	50.5	37.1	13.4	7.5
Paraguay	46.2	32.5	13.7	7.3
Seychelles	38.2	24.4	13.8	7.3
Venezuela	51.7	37.9	13.9	7.2
Ecuador	55.9	41.7	14.2	7.1
Turkey	45.8	31.7	14.1	7.1
Northern Mariana Islands	47.8	32.7	15.1	6.6
Kazakhstan	59.3	44	15.3	6.5
Antigua and Barbuda	47.9	32.3	15.6	6.4
Brazil	43.8	28.2	15.6	6.4
Panama	54.2	38.6	15.6	6.4
Costa Rica	42.5	26.8	15.8	6.3
Jamaica	52.1	36.2	15.9	6.3
New Caledonia	46.1	30.3	15.8	6.3
Palau	40.3	24.5	15.8	6.3
Tunisia	53.4	37.5	16	6.3
French Polynesia	45.7	29.6	16.1	6.2
North Korea	45.1	28.8	16.3	6.1
Falkland Islands	38.4	21.8	16.6	6
Saint Martin	55 N	38.2	16.8	6
British Virgin Islands	40.2	23.2	16.9	5.9
Colombia	50.3	33.5	16.9	5.9
Anguilla	48.2	30.9	17.3	5.8
Guam	59.4	42.1	17.3	5.8
Greenland	49	30.3	18.6	5.4
Saint Kitts and Nevis	46.9	28.2	18.7	5.3
Saint Vincent and the Grenadines	46.5	27.5	19	5.3
Wallis and Futuna	48.1	29.3	18.8	5.3
Sri Lanka	53.8	34.7	19.1	5.2
Argentina	50.9	31.5	19.4	5.1
Grenada	53.1	33.5	19.6	5.1
Mauritius	40.9	21.2	19.6	5.1
Chile	44.9	24.8	20	5
Singapore	40.7	20.6	20.2	5
Israel	65.9	45.6	20.4	4.9
China	43.9	23.2	20.7	4.8
Cyprus	42.9	22.2	20.6	4.8
Dominica	52.3	31.5	20.9	4.8
Trinidad and Tobago	48.8	27.9	21	4.8
Moldova	42.5	21.1	21.4	4.7
Thailand	44.8	22.9	21.9	4.6
Macau	43	20.5	22.5	4.5
Uruguay	49.1	26.9	22.2	4.5
Armenia	49.2	26.4	22.8	4.4
North Macedonia	46.2	23.4	22.9	4.4
Sint Maarten	50.8	27.8	23	4.4
Albania	47.8	24.3	23.5	4.3
Luxembourg	46.6	23.2	23.4	4.3
Saint Lucia	50	26.9	23.1	4.3
Barbados	49.2	24.8	24.4	4.1
Cook Islands	51.8	27.6	24.2	4.1
Ireland	52.6	28.5	24.1	4.1
Cayman Islands	51.7	26.4	25.3	4
Aruba	52.3	26.3	26.1	3.8
Australia	54.5	28.3	26.2	3.8
Cuba	49.6	23	26.5	3.8
Georgia	59.5	32.9	26.6	3.8
New Zealand	55.8	29.5	26.3	3.8
Niue	64.6	38.2	26.4	3.8
Belarus	51.4	24.4	27	3.7
Bosnia and Herzegovina	43.5	16.8	26.7	3.7
Iceland	58.3	31.3	27	3.7
Russia	52.2	25.2	27	3.7
Slovakia	50.3	23	27.3	3.7
Taiwan	44.9	17.6	27.3	3.7
Gibraltar	59.9	32	27.9	3.6
Montenegro	55.3	27.5	27.8	3.6
Jersey	54.7	26.4	28.3	3.5
South Korea	43.6	15.2	28.4	3.5
Saint Helena, Ascension and Tristan da Cunha	50.4	21.5	28.9	3.5
United States	55.4	27	28.4	3.5
Curaçao	60.6	30.8	29.8	3.4
Norway	55	25.3	29.6	3.4
Ukraine	47.6	18.2	29.4	3.4
Andorra	47.8	17.7	30.1	3.3
Faroe Islands	62.7	32.6	30.1	3.3
Poland	51.6	21.6	30.1	3.3
Serbia	52.3	21.9	30.4	3.3
United Kingdom	56.4	26.2	30.2	3.3
Austria	53.4	21.7	31.7	3.2
Spain	51.3	19.7	31.6	3.2
Switzerland	54.8	23.3	31.5	3.2
Belgium	57.3	25.3	32.1	3.1
Bulgaria	53.4	21.1	32.3	3.1
Czech Republic	56.7	24.6	32.2	3.1
Denmark	57.2	24.7	32.5	3.1
Estonia	57.6	25.4	32.2	3.1
Latvia	55.6	23.5	32.1	3.1
Liechtenstein	56.5	23.9	32.6	3.1
Lithuania	55.9	23.5	32.3	3.1
Malta	53.7	21.4	32.4	3.1
Netherlands	56	23.7	32.4	3.1
Canada	56.8	23.9	32.9	3
Croatia	55.2	21.6	33.6	3
European Union	57.2	22.8	34.5	3
Guernsey	55.9	22.3	33.5	3
Hong Kong	54.2	20.4	33.8	3
Hungary	56.4	22.8	33.6	3
San Marino	55.5	22.2	33.4	3
Sweden	61.1	27.6	33.5	3
Portugal	53.8	19.5	34.3	2.9
France	64.8	28.6	36.2	2.8
Isle of Man	61.7	25.9	35.7	2.8
Slovenia	58.5	22.8	35.7	2.8
United States Virgin Islands	67.2	31.3	35.9	2.8
Bermuda	64.1	26.9	37.2	2.7
Italy	55	18.4	36.6	2.7
Romania	61.3	24.9	36.4	2.7
Saint Barthélemy	58.5	22	36.5	2.7
Finland	62.4	23.8	38.5	2.6
Germany	60	22.1	37.9	2.6
Greece	59.8	22	37.8	2.6
Puerto Rico	59.7	19.9	39.8	2.5
Saint Pierre and Miquelon	62.5	21.3	41.1	2.4
Japan	71.2	20.8	50.4	2
Monaco	85.9	16.9	69	1.4
World	53.4	37.7	15.7	6.4
