= Demographic window =

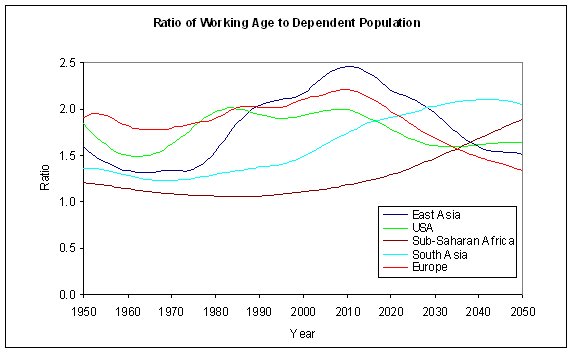
Inverse dependency ratios in world regions, showing US window 1970–2030 and East Asian window 1980–2040

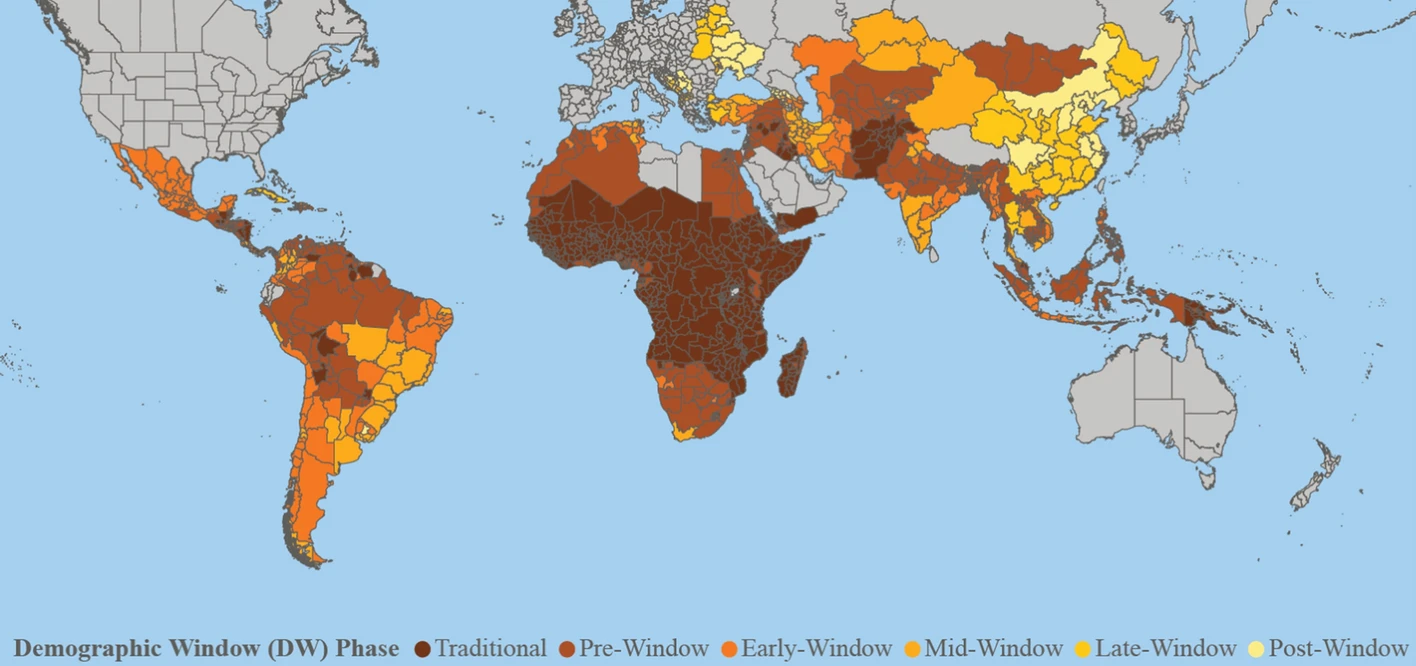
Demographic Phase as per the classification of the Global Data Lab for 1,921 area's in Less Developed Countries

The demographic window is the interval of time in a nation's demographic evolution when the proportion of population of working age group is particularly prominent. This occurs when the demographic structure of a population becomes younger and the percentage of people able to work reaches its height. Typically, the demographic window of opportunity lasts for 30–40 years depending upon the country. Because of the mechanical link between fertility levels and age structures, the timing and duration of this period is closely associated to those of fertility decline: when birth rates fall, the age pyramid first shrinks with gradually lower proportions of young population (under 15s) and the dependency ratio decreases as is happening (or happened) in various parts of East Asia over several decades. After a few decades, low fertility however causes the population to get older and the growing proportion of elderly people inflates again the dependency ratio as is observed in present-day Europe.

The exact technical boundaries of definition may vary. The UN Population Department has defined it as period when the proportion of children and youth under 15 years falls below 30 per cent and the proportion of people 65 years and older is still below 15 per cent. The Global Data Lab released an alternative classification of phases:

Definition of Global Data Lab Demographic Window Phases
Phase	Under 15 (%)	Over 64 (%)
Traditional	>40	-
Pre-window	30-40	-
Early-window	25-30	-
Mid-window	20-25	-
Late-window	<20	<15
Post-window	-	>15

Europe's demographic window lasted from 1950 to 2000. It began in China in 1990 and is expected to last until 2015. India is expected to enter the demographic window in 2010, which may last until the middle of the present century. Much of Africa will not enter the demographic window until 2045 or later.

Societies who have entered the demographic window have smaller dependency ratio (ratio of dependents to working-age population) and therefore the demographic potential for high economic growth as favorable dependency ratios tend to boost savings and investments in human capital. But this so-called "demographic bonus" (or demographic dividend) remains only a potential advantage as low participation rates (for instance among women) or rampant unemployment may limit the impact of favorable age structures.

For a list of demographic windows of other nations check the UN link in References.

== See also ==
- Demographics
