= Dependency ratio =

Age-population ratio of those in the labor force to those not in the labor force

Age dependency ratio of working age population

Dependency ratios are ratios of the numbers of dependents (youths aged 0–14 and/or elderly aged 65+) to the number of working-age adults (15–64). They serve as indicators of population age structures and social support requirements.

A lower dependency ratio means that there are more working-age adults to support dependents.

A lower ratio could allow for better pensions and better health care for citizens. A higher ratio indicates more financial stress on working people and possible political instability. While the strategies of increasing fertility and of allowing immigration especially of younger working age people have been formulas for lowering dependency ratios, future job reductions through automation may impact the effectiveness of those strategies.

== Definitions/Formulae ==
- The total dependency ratio is the number of youths and elderly per hundred working-age adults:

$\text{Total Dependency Ratio} = \frac{\text{Number aged 0 to 14} + \text{Number aged at least 65}}{\text{Number aged 15 to 64}} \times 100$.

- The youth dependency ratio is the number of youths per hundred working-age adults:

$\text{Youth Dependency Ratio} = \frac{\text{Number aged 0 to 14}}{\text{Number aged 15 to 64}} \times 100$.

- The elderly dependency ratio is the number of elderly per hundred working-age adults:

$\text{Elderly Dependency Ratio} = \frac{\text{Number aged at least 65}}{\text{Number aged 15 to 64}} \times 100$.

== Total dependency ratio by regions ==
=== Projections ===
Age dependency ratio projected to 2100

Below is a table constructed from data provided by the UN Population Division. It shows a historical ratio for the regions shown for the period 1950 - 2010. Columns to the right show projections of the ratio. Each number in the table shows the total number of dependents (people aged 0–14 plus people aged over 65) per hundred people in the workforce (number of people aged 15–64). The number can also be expressed as a percent. So, the total dependency ratio for the world in 1950 was 64.8% of the workforce.

Region	1950	1970	1990	2010	2030	2050	2070	2090
World	64.8	74.9	64.0	52.5	54.7	59.1	62.3	65.7
Africa	80.5	90.1	91.6	81.2	67.7	61.5	55.8	55.7
Asia	67.9	79.5	63.3	48.0	50.6	55.8	63.0	69.9
Europe	52.2	55.6	49.7	46.6	64.7	74.9	75.6	80.6
Latin America & The Caribbean	78.0	86.7	69.8	52.4	50.2	57.3	70.7	80.4
North America	54.4	61.7	51.7	49.0	64.8	65.2	72.3	76.2
Oceania	59.2	65.8	56.2	53.4	60.3	61.8	64.4	69.5

As of 2010, Japan and Europe had high aged dependency ratios (that is over 65 as % of workforce) compared to other parts of the world. In Europe 2010, for every adult aged 65 and older there are approximately four working age adults (15-64); This ratio (one:four, or 25%) is expected to decrease to one:two, or 50%, by 2050. An aging population is caused by a decline in fertility and longer life expectancy. The average life expectancy of males and females are expected to increase from 79 years in 1990 to 82 years in 2025. The dependency amongst Japan residents aged 65 and older is expected to increase which will have a major impact on Japan's economy.

== Inverse dependency ratio ==
The inverse of the dependency ratio, the inverse dependency ratio can be interpreted as how many independent workers have to provide for one dependent person (pension & expenditure on children).

== Old-age dependency ratio ==
Age dependency ratio old

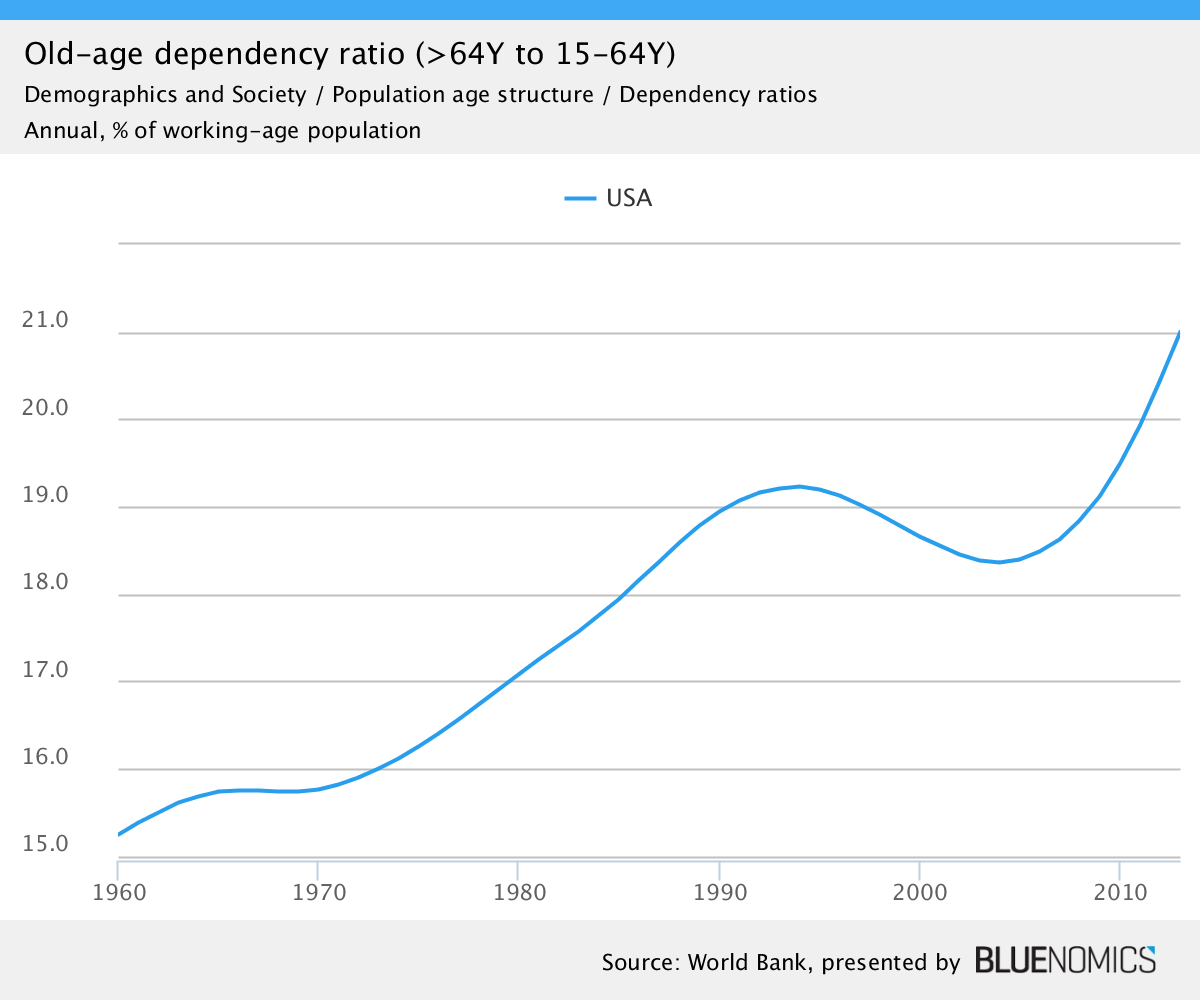
This chart depicts the old age dependency ratio in the US

A high dependency ratio can cause serious problems for a country if a large proportion of a government's expenditure is on health, social security & education, which are most used by the youngest and the oldest in a population. The fewer people of working age, the fewer the people who can support schools, retirement pensions, disability pensions and other assistances to the youngest and oldest members of a population, often considered the most vulnerable members of society. The ratio of old (usually retired) to young working people is called old age dependency ratio (OADR) or just dependency ratio.

The old-age dependency ratio ignores the fact that the 65+ are not necessarily dependent (an increasing proportion of them are working, see also retirement age) and that many of those of 'working age' are actually not working. Alternatives have been developed', such as the 'economic dependency ratio', but they still ignore factors such as increases in productivity and in working hours. Worries about the increasing (demographic) dependency ratio should thus be taken with caution.

== Labor force dependency ratio ==
The labor force dependency ratio (LFDR) is a more specific metric than the old age dependency ratio because it measures the ratio of the older retired population to the employed population at all ages (or the ratio of the inactive population to the active population at all ages).

== Productivity weighted labor force dependency ratio ==
While OADRs or LFDRs provide reasonable measures of dependency, they do not account for the fact that middle-aged and educated workers are usually the most productive. Hence the productivity weighted labor force dependency ratio (PWLFDR) may be a better metric to determine dependency. The PWLFDR is the ratio of inactive population (all ages) to active population (all ages), weighted by productivity for education level. Interestingly, while OADRs or LFDRs can change substantially, the PWLFDR is predicted to remain relatively constant in countries like China for the next couple of decades. PWLFDR assessments recommend to invest in education and life-long learning and child health to maintain social stability even when populations age.

== Migrant labor dependency ratio ==
Migrant labor dependency ratio (MLDR) is used to describe the extent to which the domestic population is dependent upon migrant labor.

== Impact on savings and housing markets ==
High dependency ratios can lead to long-term economic changes within the population such as saving rates, investment rates, the housing markets, and the consumption patterns. Typically, workers will start to increase their savings as they grow closer to retirement age, but this will eventually affect their long-term interest rates due to the retirement population increasing and the fertility rates decreasing. If the demographic population continues to follow this trend, their savings will decrease while their long-term interest rates increase. Due to the saving rates decreasing, the investment rate will prevent economic growth because there will be less funding for investment projects. There is a correlation between labor force and housing markets, so when there is a high age-dependency ratio in a country, the investments in housing markets will decrease since the labor force is decreasing due to a high dependency population.

== Solutions ==
Age dependency ratio young of working age population

Low dependency ratios promote economic growth while high dependency ratios decrease economic growth due to the large amounts of dependents that pay little to no taxes. A solution to decreasing the dependency ratio within a country is to promote immigration for younger people. This will stimulate a higher economic growth because the working-age population will grow in number if more young adults migrate into their country.

The increase in the involvement of women in the work force has contributed to the working-age population which complements the dependency ratio for a country. Encouraging women to work will help decrease the dependency ratio. Because more women are getting higher education, it is less likely for them to have children, causing the fertility rates to decrease as well.

Using productivity weighted labor force dependency ratio (PWLFDR) suggests that even an aging or decreasing population can maintain a stable support for the dependent (primarily ageing) population by increasing its productivity. A consequence from PWLFDR assessments is the recommendation to invest in education and life-long learning, child health, and to support disabled workers.

== Demographic transition model ==
The age-dependency ratio can determine which stage in the Demographic Transition Model a certain country is in. The dependency ratio acts like a rollercoaster when going through the stages of the Demographic Transition Model. During stages 1 and 2, the dependency ratio is high due to significantly high crude birth rates putting pressure onto the smaller working-age population to take care of all of them. In stage 3, the dependency ratio starts to decrease because fertility and mortality rates start to decrease which shows that the proportion of adults to the young and elderly are much larger in this stage.

In stages 4 and 5, the dependency ratio starts to increase once again as the working-age population retires. Because fertility rates caused the younger population to decrease, once they grow up and start working, there will be more pressure for them to take care of the previous working-age population that just retired since there will be more young and elderly people than working-age adults during that time period.

The population structure of a country is an important factor for determining the economic status of their country. Japan is a great example of an aging population. They have a 1:4 ratio of people 65 years and older. This causes trouble for them because there is not enough people in the working-age population to support all of the elders. Rwanda is another example of a population that struggles with a younger population (also known as the "youth bulge"). Both of these countries are struggling with high dependency ratios even though both countries are on opposite stages of the Demographic Transition Model.

== Criticism ==
The dependency ratio has been criticized for ignoring that many older adults are employed, and many younger adults are not, and obscuring other trends such as improving health for older people that might make older people less economically dependent. For this reason, the Office of the United Nations High Commissioner for Human Rights has characterized the metric as ageist, and recommends avoiding its use. Alternative metrics, such as the economic dependency ratio (defined as the number of unemployed and retired people divided by the number of workers) do address this oversimplification, but ignore the effects of productivity and work hours.

== See also ==
- List of countries by dependency ratio
- Demographic economics
- Economic collapse
- Employment-to-population ratio
- Intergenerational equity
- Generational accounting
- Pensions crisis
- Population ageing
- Sub-replacement fertility
- Societal collapse

Case studies:

- Ageing of Europe
- Ageing of Japan
