= John Caldwell (demographer) =

Australian demographer

John Charles "Jack" Caldwell AO (8 December 1928 – 12 March 2016) was an Australian demographer. He researched extensively in Africa, South Asia and Southeast Asia since 1959, particularly the fields of fertility transition and health transition. Caldwell had a significant impact on demographic teaching, research and policy formulation.

== Biography ==
Caldwell was born in Sydney, Australia and educated at Sydney University and Sydney Teachers College (1946–48), University of New England (1955–1958), Australian National University (PhD, 1959–61). In February 1948, he married Pat Caldwell née Barrett (12 January 1922 – 24 May 2008). They raised four sons during their 60 years together, living in south east Asia, Africa, the United States, South Asia and Australia at various times. Pat participated extensively in demographic research in Africa and Asia and co-authored two books and a considerable number of research papers.

Caldwell's first academic appointment was at the University of Ghana (1962–64), and he was on the staff of the Department of Demography at the Australian National University since 1964 apart from two years leave working for the Population Council in New York City in 1968 and at the University of Ife, Nigeria in 1969. He was a professor from 1970. In 1989 he helped start the National Centre for Epidemiology and Population Health at the Australian National University in Canberra. He remained there till 1998 as Director of its Health Transition Centre. In 1991 the Health Transition Review was published from the Australian National University until 1997 with Caldwell as its editor.

In 1995, Caldwell retired as Professor at the Australian National University and Associate Director of the National Centre for Epidemiology and Population Health. An international conference, The Continuing Demographic Transition John C Caldwell Seminar was held in his honour at the Australian National University. In 1996 he became Emeritus Professor of Demography at the Australian National University. In 1998 the John C Caldwell Chair in Population, Health and Development was established in his honour at the National Centre for Epidemiology and Population Health.

Caldwell was a Fellow of the Academy of the Social Sciences in Australia and was president of the International Union for the Scientific Study of Population and a member of the Population Council. He was the author of 25 books, 128 book chapters and 139 journal articles.

He died on 12 March 2016 in Canberra.

== Influence in demographic research ==
According to the Encyclopedia of Population, Caldwell's work on demographic and health transition is "cited almost de rigueur by those in these fields". He was particularly noted for his "wealth flows" theory, which relates demographic transition to changes in intergenerational transfers within the family. This theory has been criticised for its lack of testability, but it has "captured the imagination of many researchers" and stimulated micro-demographic research in the field. He worked on many areas of demographic theory, including the importance of education and the status of women in determining demographic change, and the study of the AIDS epidemic, particularly in Africa. The first global survey of demographers carried out in 2000 reported that Caldwell and Ansley J. Coale were recorded as being in approximately equal first place in their impact on demographic teaching, research and policy formulation over the second half of the 20th century.

== Awards ==
- United Nations Population Award (2004)
- Officer of the Order of Australia (1994)
- Irene Tauber Award for excellence in demographic research (1985)
- Honorary Doctor of Science (Social Sciences), University of Southampton (1992)
- Honorary Doctor of Science (Science), Australian National University (1992)
- Centenary Medal for services to Australian society in epidemiology and population health (2001)
- Award of the Australian Research Citation Laureateship (2004)

== Selected bibliography ==
- Caldwell, John C. (1976). "Toward a restatement of demographic transition theory". Population and Development Review. 2 (3/4). Population Council: 321–366. doi:10.2307/1971615. JSTOR 1971615.
- Caldwell, John C. (1982). Theory of Fertility Decline. London: Academic Press. p. 1503. ISBN 0-12-155080-X.
- Caldwell, John C. (June 1986). "Routes to low mortality in poor countries". Population and Development Review. 12 (2). Population Council: 171–220. doi:10.2307/1973108. JSTOR 1973108.
- Caldwell, John C.; Pat Caldwell (1996). "The African AIDS epidemic". Scientific American. 274 (3). Population Council: 40–46. Bibcode:1996SciAm.274c..62C. doi:10.1038/scientificamerican0396-62.
- Caldwell, John C.; Bruce K Caldwell; Pat Caldwell; Peter F McDonald; Thomas Schindlmayr (2006). Demographic Transition Theory. Dordrecht, The Netherlands: Springer. p. 418. ISBN 1-4020-4373-2.

=== Works about John Caldwell ===
- Schultz, T Paul; Caldwell, John C. (March 1983). "John C. Caldwell, Theory of Fertility Decline". Population and Development Review. 9 (1). Population Council: 161–168. doi:10.2307/1972905. JSTOR 1972905.
- Willis, Robert J. (1982). "The direction of intergenerational transfers and demographic transition: The Caldwell hypothesis reexamined". Population and Development Review. 8 (supp). Population Council: 207–234. doi:10.2307/2808116. JSTOR 2808116.
