= Niyi (rapper) =

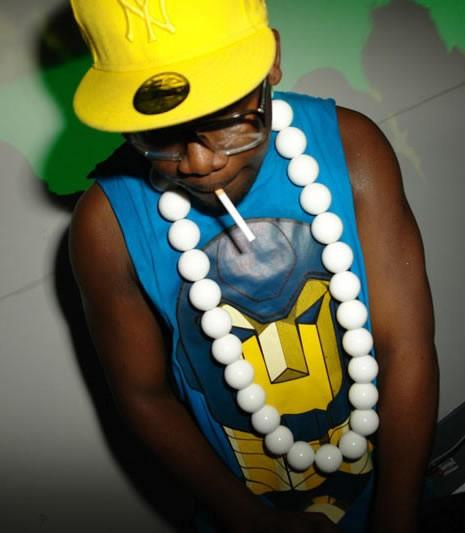
- Niyi playing in Berlin club, 2011
- Born: Adeniyi Adeyemi Adelakun; Liverpool, England
- Occupations: Rapper, singer, DJ
- Musical career
- Genres: Electronic, alternative hip hop, alternative dance
- Instruments: Vocals, drum machine, guitar
- Years active: 2004–present
- Labels: Tummy Touch
- Website: www.iheartniyi.com

Adeniyi Adeyemi Adelakun, better known as Niyi, is a British MC and singer from Crouch End North London, known for his flamboyant dress sense and unique mixing style. He is a producer and DJ commonly associated with the East London fashion scene.

== Musical career ==
Niyi moved to London to study at art university Central Saint Martins, where he subsequently dropped out twice.

He moved into doing club nights and DJing when he found the clubbing scene "too exclusive [..] it wasn't very inclusive at all". At this point Niyi started promoting illegal warehouse raves, but stopped when his biggest promotion was shut down by the police and 4,500 young people were on the street on New Year's Eve. When his mixing style became more well known he had guest slots on BBC Radio 1, XFM, and German On3-radio, and DJed at bigger clubs such as Fabric. Niyi has since stated he now mixes in a more traditional style, but still enjoys "perfectly beat matching surf rock with hardcore-gabba".

After touring in Europe with Adamski, Niyi performed at his club for Lady Gaga's first UK show, and has since gone on to perform and DJ in 13 countries. He has performed with Little Boots and the Golden Silvers. He also performed on influential television show TRAXX on ARTE around this time, too. This was shown in both Germany and France.

Niyi has been credited as a source of creative inspiration by various artists such as Tyler, The Creator. Niyi's first single "808 Klap" sold out within a week. In 2012 Niyi released his first and only album, which gained little attention.

He was also an occasional contributor to the UK's Big Brother's Big Mouth, this is despite him "not owning a television for more than eight years".

== Discography ==
=== Albums ===
- Great Britain: The Best of 2005–2012 (2012)

=== EPs ===
- 808 Klap (2007)
- Jungle Fever (2009)

=== Singles ===
- "I Love You All" / "Poached Eggs" (2008)
- "Boom Bang Boy" (2010)
