= S. Philip Morgan =

S. Philip Morgan (born 1953) is the Alan Feduccia Professor of Sociology at the University of North Carolina-Chapel Hill and a former director of the Carolina Population Center. Morgan holds a master's and Ph.D. in sociology from the University of Arizona, and bachelor's in sociology from the University of North Carolina-Chapel Hill.

== Awards ==
- 2014 Distinguished Professor of Sociology, University of North Carolina, Chapel Hill, NC
- 2011 Recipient: Distinguished Career Award, Sociology of the Family Section, American Sociological Association
- 2008 Norb F. Schaefer Professor of International Studies, Duke University, Durham, NC
- 2003 Elected President of the Population Association of America
