= Niyi Ogunlana =

Nigerian footballer (born 1984)

Personal information
- Full name: Anthony Adegboyega Ogunlana
- Date of birth: August 14, 1984 (age 42)
- Place of birth: Minna, Nigeria
- Position: Midfielder

Team information
- Current team: Kwara United F.C. (Welfare Officer)

Youth career
- 1990–1992: St. Joseph's Nursery & Primary School
- 1992–1995: Government Secondary School
- 1996–1997: University of Ilorin-Nigeria

Senior career*
Years	Team	Apps	(Gls)
1997–2001	Kwara United F.C.	31	(6)
2001–2003	Katsina United F.C.	25	(0)
2004–2006	Kwara United F.C.	16	(2)

Managerial career
- 2006–: Kwara United F.C. (Welfare Officer)
- * Club domestic league appearances and goals

Babatunde Niyi Ogunlana (born August 14, 1984 in Patako) is a former Nigerian football player, who was last playing for Kwara United F.C. of Ilorin.

== Career ==
Hails from Patako in the Ifelodun local government area of Kwara State, he is otherwise called ‘Overmars'. He attended St. Joseph's Nursery & Primary School, Ilorin and the Government Secondary School, Ilorin (1992). He obtained his first degree, BSc (Geography) from the University of Ilorin-Nigeria (1997).

He has played for Kwara Stars F.C. of Ilorin (1997–2001), Katsina United F.C. of Katsina (2001–2003), Kwara United F.C. of Ilorin (2004 to date).

== Retirement ==
After retiring was named as Welfare officer of Kwara United F.C.
