= Niyi Makanjuola =

Nigerian businessman (born 1980)

Adeniyi Makanjuola
- Born: February 16, 1980 (age 46); Nigeria
- Other names: Niyi Makanjuola
- Education: University College London University of Essex
- Occupations: Businessman and Investor
- Known for: Chairman of Caverton Helicopters

Niyi Makanjuola (born 16 February 1980) is a Nigerian businessman, investor who is the chairman of Caverton Helicopters, Group CEO of Raven Resources Group and Visionscape International Holdings.

Niyi is the son of Chief Remi Makanjuola, the president of Caverton offshore support group.

== Career ==
He moved back from the UK to Nigeria after his studies and joined Caverton Group, he then started Caverton Helicopters a wholly owned Nigerian helicopter operator in the year 2002 as a subsidiary of the Caverton Group. Niyi is also the Group CEO of Visionscape Group. He led Visionscape Group into Africa. The waste management subsidiary Visionscape Sanitation Solutions was awarded a 10-year waste management contract by the Lagos State Government following environmental reforms by the former Governor Akinwunmi Ambode administration.
