= Balal Mohamed Osman =

Somali politician

Balal Mohammed Osman is a Somali politician and diplomat who served as Somali special envoy to the Horn of Africa, Red Sea and Gulf of Aden Affairs, and State Minister of Foreign Affairs of Somalia.
