= Birth rate =

Total number of live births per 1,000 divided by time period

Countries by birth rate

Birth rate, also known as natality and crude birth rate, is the total number of live human births per 1,000 population for a given period divided by the length of the period in years. The number of live births is normally taken from a universal registration system for births, or population counts from a census. The birth rate (along with mortality and migration rates) is used to calculate population growth. The estimated average population may be taken as the mid-year population.

When the crude death rate is subtracted from the crude birth rate (CBR), the result is the rate of natural increase (RNI). This is equal to the rate of population change (excluding migration).

The total (crude) birth rate (which includes all births)—typically indicated as births per 1,000 population—is distinguished from a set of age-specific rates (the number of births per 1,000 persons, or more usually 1,000 females, in each age group). The first known use of the term "birth rate" in English was in 1856.

World historical and projected crude birth rates (1950–2050) UN, medium variant, 2019 rev.
Years	CBR	Years	CBR
1950–1955	36.9	2000–2005	21.0
1955–1960	35.4	2005–2010	20.3
1960–1965	35.2	2010–2015	19.5
1965–1970	34.0	2015–2020	18.5
1970–1975	31.4	2020–2025	17.5
1975–1980	28.5	2025–2030	16.6
1980–1985	27.7	2030–2035	16.0
1985–1990	27.4	2035–2040	15.5
1990–1995	24.2	2040–2045	15.0
1995–2000	22.2	2045–2050	14.6

The average global birth rate was 17 births per 1,000 total population in 2024. The death rate was 7.9 per 1,000. The RNI was thus 0.91 percent. In 2012, the average global birth rate was 19.611 per 1,000 according to the World Bank and 19.15 births per 1,000 total population according to the CIA, compared to 20.09 per 1,000 total population in 2007. Birth rates ranging from 10 to 20 births per 1,000 are considered low, while rates from 40 to 50 births per 1,000 are considered high.

The 2024 average of 17 births per 1,000 total population equates to approximately 4.3 births per second or about 260 births per minute for the world. On average, two people in the world die every second or about 121 per minute. Since the 1950s, the global birth and death rate has generally declined over time, though the global death rate increased during the COVID-19 pandemic in the early 2020's due to excess mortality.

== In politics ==
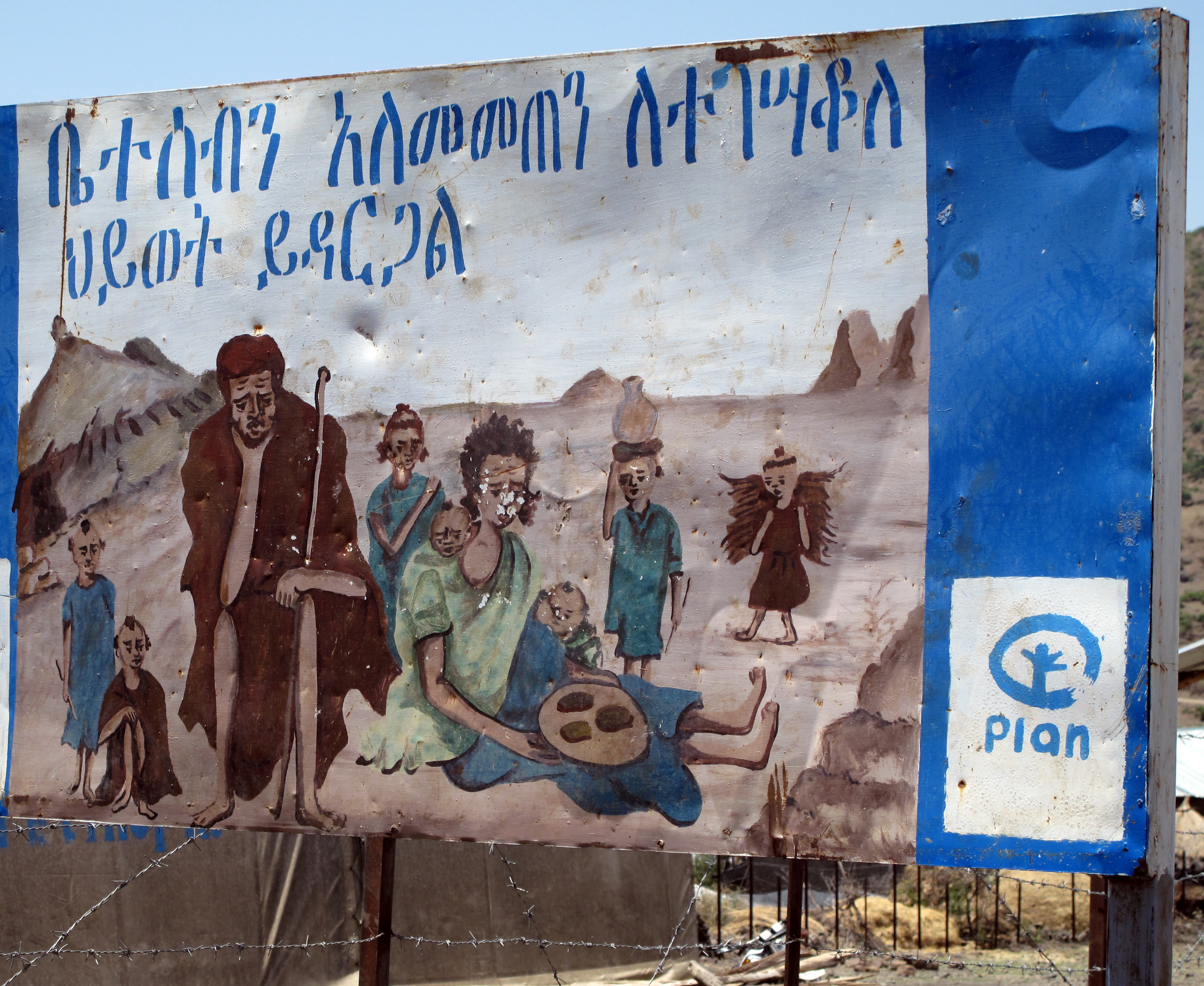
Placard showing negative effects of lack of family planning and having too many children and infants (Ethiopia)

The birth rate is an issue of concern and policy for national governments. Some (including those of Italy and Malaysia) seek to increase the birth rate with financial incentives or provision of support services to new mothers. Conversely, other countries have policies to reduce the birth rate (for example, China's one-child policy which was in effect from 1979 to 2015). Policies to increase the crude birth rate are known as pro-natalist policies, and policies to reduce the crude birth rate are known as anti-natalist policies. Non-coercive measures such as improved information on birth control and its availability have achieved good results in countries such as Iran and Bangladesh.

There has also been discussion on whether bringing women into the forefront of development initiatives will lead to a decline in birth rates. In some countries, government policies have focused on reducing birth rates by improving women's rights, sexual and reproductive health. Typically, high birth rates are associated with health problems, low life expectancy, low living standards, low social status for women and low educational levels. Demographic transition theory postulates that as a country undergoes economic development and social change its population growth declines, with birth rates serving as an indicator.

At the 1974 World Population Conference in Bucharest, Romania, women's issues gained considerable attention. Family programs were discussed, and 137 countries drafted a World Population Plan of Action. As part of the discussion, many countries accepted modern birth control methods such as the birth control pill and the condom while opposing abortion. Population concerns, as well as the desire to include women in the discourse, were discussed; it was agreed that improvements in women's status and initiatives in defense of reproductive health and freedom, the environment, and sustainable socioeconomic development were needed.

== Population control ==
In the 20th century, several authoritarian governments sought either to increase or to decrease the birth rates, sometimes through forceful intervention. One of the most notorious natalist policies was that in communist Romania in 1967–1990, during the time of communist leader Nicolae Ceaușescu, who adopted a very aggressive natalist policy which included outlawing abortion and contraception, routine pregnancy tests for women, taxes on childlessness, and legal discrimination against childless people. This policy has been depicted in movies and documentaries (such as 4 Months, 3 Weeks and 2 Days, and Children of the Decree). These policies temporarily increased birth rates for a few years, but this was followed by a decline due to the increased use of illegal abortion. Ceaușescu's policy resulted in over 9,000 deaths of women due to illegal abortions, large numbers of children put into Romanian orphanages by parents who could not cope with raising them, street children in the 1990s (when many orphanages were closed and the children ended on the streets), and overcrowding in homes and schools. Ultimately, this aggressive natalist policy led to a generation who eventually led the Romanian Revolution which overthrew and executed him.

In stark contrast to Ceaușescu's natalist policy was China's one child policy, in effect from 1978 to 2015, which included abuses such as forced abortions. This policy has also been deemed responsible for the common practice of sex-selective abortion which led to an imbalanced sex ratio in the country. Given strict family size limitations and a preference for sons, girls became unwanted in China because they were considered as depriving the parents of the chance of having a son. With the progress of prenatal sex-determination technologies and induced abortion, the one-child policy gradually turned into a one-son policy.

In many countries, the steady decline in birth rates over the past decades can largely be attributed to access to contraception, equal access to education, and increased socioeconomic opportunities, as well as women of all economic, social, religious and educational persuasions are choosing to have fewer children.

In Bangladesh, one of the poorest countries in the world, women are less likely to have two children (or more) than they were before 1999, according to Australian demographer Jack Caldwell. Bangladeshi women eagerly took up contraceptives, such as condoms and the pill, according to a study in 1994 by the World Bank. The study proved that family planning could be carried out and accepted practically anywhere. Caldwell also believes that agricultural improvements led to the need for less labour. Children not needed to plough the fields would be of surplus and require some education, so in turn, families become smaller and women are able to work and have greater ambitions. Other examples of non-coercive family planning policies are Ethiopia, Thailand, and Indonesia.

Myanmar was controlled until 2011 by an austere military junta, intent on controlling every aspect of people's lives. The generals wanted the country's population doubled. In their view, women's job was to produce babies to power the country's labour force, so family planning was vehemently opposed. The women of Burma opposed this policy, and Peter McDonald of the Australian National University argues that this gave rise to a black market trade in contraceptives, smuggled in from neighbouring Thailand.

In 1990, five years after the Iraq–Iran war ended, Iran saw the fastest recorded fall in fertility in world history. Revolution gave way to consumerism and westernization. With TVs and cars came condoms and birth control pills. A generation of women had been expected to produce soldiers to fight Iraq, but the next generation of women could choose to enjoy some newfound luxuries. During the war, the women of Iran averaged about 8 children each, a ratio the hard-line Islamic President Mahmoud Ahmadinejad wanted to revive. As of 2010, the birth rate of Iran is 1.7 babies per woman. Some observers claim this to be a triumph of Western values of freedom for women against states with Islamic values.

Islamic clerics are also having less influence over women in other Muslim countries. In the past 30 years Turkey's fertility rate of children per woman has dropped from 4.07 to 2.08. Tunisia has dropped from 4.82 to 2.14 and Morocco from 5.4 to 2.52 children per woman.

Latin America, of predominately Catholic faith, has seen the same trends of falling fertility rates. Brazilian women are having half the children compared to 25 years ago: a rate of 1.7 children per woman. The Vatican now has less influence over women in other hard-line Catholic countries. Mexico, El Salvador, Ecuador, Nicaragua, Colombia, Venezuela and Peru have all seen significant drops in fertility in the same period, all going from over six to less than three children per woman. Forty percent of married Brazilian women are choosing to get sterilised after having children. Some observers claim this to be a triumph of modern Western values of freedom for women against states with Catholic values.

== National birth rates ==
According to the CIA's The World Factbook, the country with the highest birth rate is Niger at 6.49 children born per woman and the country with the lowest birth rate is Taiwan, at 1.13 children born per woman. Compared with the 1950s (when the birth rate was 36 per thousand), as of 2011, the world birth rate has declined by 16 per thousand.

As of 2017, Niger has had 49.443 births per thousand people. Japan has one of the lowest birth rates in the world with 8 per thousand people. While in Japan there are 126 million people and in Niger 21 million, both countries had around 1 million babies born in 2016.

=== Sub-Saharan Africa ===
The region of Sub-Saharan Africa has the highest birth rate in the world. As of 2016, Niger, Mali, Uganda, Zambia, and Burundi have the highest birth rates in the world. This is part of the fertility-income paradox, as these countries are very poor, and it may seem counter-intuitive for families there to have so many children. The inverse relationship between income and fertility has been termed a demographic-economic "paradox" by the notion that greater means would enable the production of more offspring as suggested by the influential Thomas Malthus.

=== Afghanistan ===
Afghanistan has the 11th highest birth rate in the world, and also the highest birth rate of any non-African country (as of 2016). The rapid population growth of Afghanistan is considered a problem when it prevents population stabilization and affects maternal and infant health. Reasons for large families include tradition, religion, the different roles of men and women, and the cultural desire to have several sons.

=== Australia ===
Historically, Australia has had a relatively low fertility rate, reaching a high of 3.14 births per woman in 1960. This was followed by a decline which continued until the mid-2000, when a one off cash incentive was introduced to reverse the decline. In 2004, the then Howard government introduced a non-means tested 'Maternity Payment' to parents of every newborn as a substitute to maternity leave. The payment known as the 'Baby Bonus' was A$3000 per child. This rose to A$5000 which was paid in 13 installments.

At a time when Australia's unemployment was at a 28-year low of 5.2%, the then Treasurer Peter Costello stated there was opportunity to go lower. With a good economic outlook for Australia, Costello held the view that now was a good time to expand the population, with his famous quote that every family should have three children "one for mum, one for dad and one for the country". Australia's fertility rate reached a peak of 1.95 children per woman in 2010, a 30-year high, although still below replacement rate.

Phil Ruthven of the business information firm IBISWorld believes the spike in fertility was more about timing and less about monetary incentives. Generation X was now aged 25 to 45 years old. With numerous women putting pregnancies off for a few years for the sake of a career, many felt the years closing in and their biological clocks ticking.

On 1 March 2014, the baby bonus was replaced with Family Tax Benefit A. By then the baby bonus had left its legacy on Australia.

In 2016, Australia's fertility rate has only decreased slightly to 1.91 children per woman.

=== France ===
France has been successful in increasing fertility rates from the low levels seen in the late 1980s, after a continuous fall in the birth rate. In 1994, the total fertility rate was as low as 1.66, but perhaps due to the active family policy of the government in the mid-1990s, it has increased, and maintained an average of 2.0 from 2008 until 2015.

France has embarked on a strong incentive policy based on two key measures to restore the birth rate: family benefits (les allocations familiales) and a family-coefficient of income tax (le quotient familial). Since the end of World War II, early family policy in France has been based on a family tradition that requires children to support multi-child family, so that a third child enables a multi-child family to benefit from family allowances and income tax exemptions. This is intended to allow families with three children to enjoy the same living standards as households without children.

In particular, the French income taxation system is structured so that families with children receive tax breaks greater than single adults without children. This income tax imposition system is known as the family coefficient of income tax. A characteristic of the family factor is that households with a large number of children, even if they are at the same standard of living, can receive more tax exemption benefits.

Since the 1970s, the focus has been on supporting families who are vulnerable such as single parent families and the children of a poor family in order to ensure equality of opportunity. In addition, as many women began to participate in the labor market, the government introduced policies of financial support for childcare leave as well as childcare facilities. In 1994, the government expanded the parent education allowance (l'allocation parentale d'éducation) for women with two children to ensure freedom of choice and reduce formal unemployment in order to promote family well-being and women's labor participation.

There are also:

- an infant child care allowance, family allowance and family allowance for multichild family, and a multi-element family pension scheme.
- a medical insurance system that covers all medical expenses, hospitalization costs, and medical expenses incurred after six months of pregnancy as 100% of the national health insurance in the national social security system, and the statutory leave system during pregnancy.

=== Germany ===
In 2011, the birth rate in Germany is only 8.3 per 1,000, lower than the UK and France.

=== Ireland ===
In 2011, Ireland's birth rate was 16.5 per 1,000 (3.5 percent higher than the next-ranked country in the EU, the UK). This reduced to 10.5 per 1,000 by 2022.

=== Japan ===
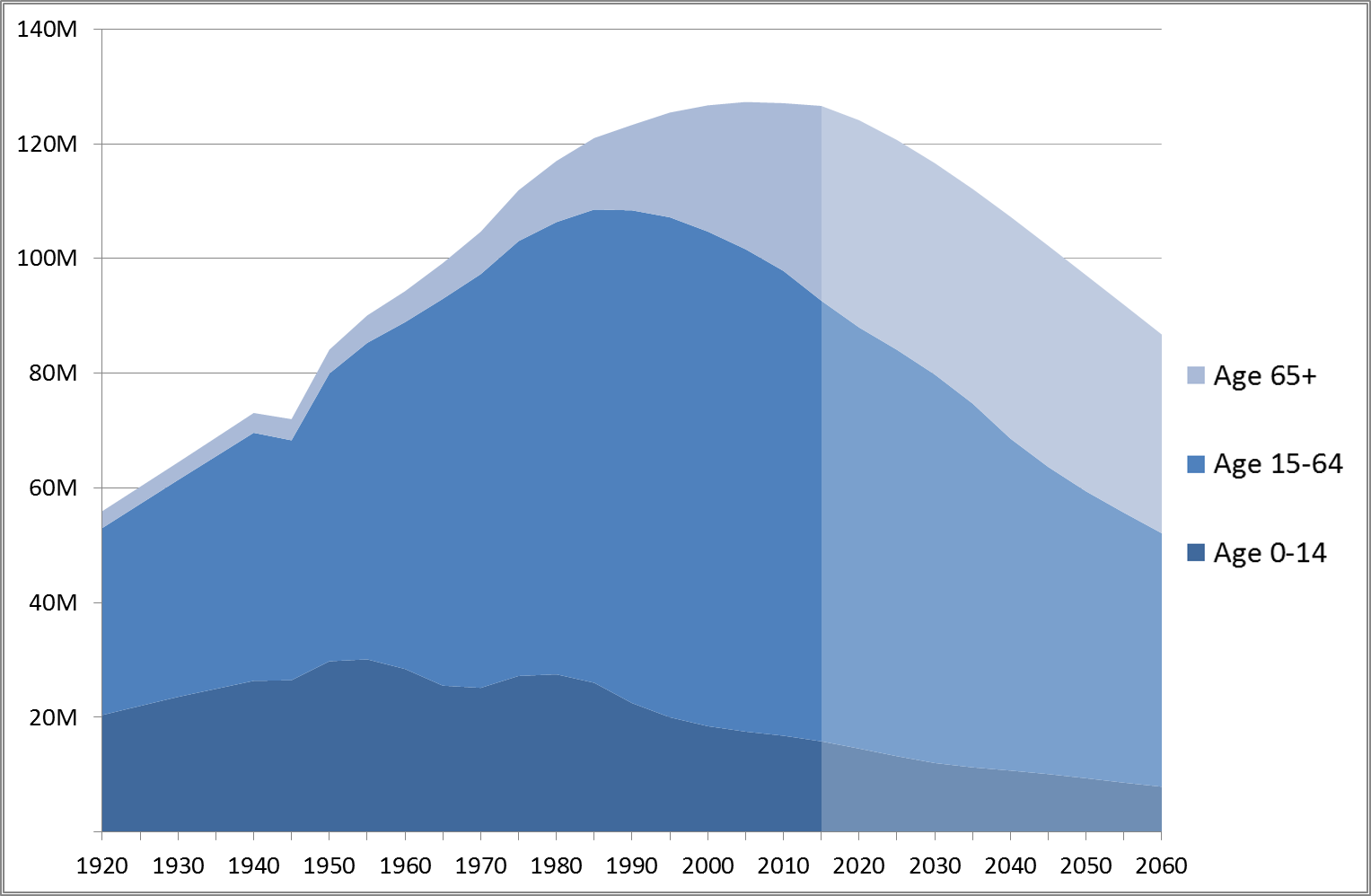
Historic population of Japan (1920–2010) with projected population (2011–2060)

In 2016, Japan had the third lowest crude birth rate (i.e. not allowing for the population's age distribution) in the world, with only Saint Pierre and Miquelon and Monaco having lower crude birth rates. Japan has an unbalanced population with many elderly but few young people, and this is projected to be more extreme in the future, unless there are major changes. An increasing number of Japanese people are staying unmarried: between 1980 and 2010, the percentage of the population who had never married increased from 22% to almost 30%, even as the population continued to age, and by 2035 one in four people will not marry during their childbearing years. The Japanese sociologist Masahiro Yamada coined the term "parasite singles" for unmarried adults in their late 20s and 30s who continue to live with their parents.

=== South Korea ===
Since joining the Organization for Economic Cooperation and Development (OECD) in 1996, South Korea's fertility rate has been on the decline. It recorded the lowest fertility rate among OECD countries in 2017, with just 1.1 children per woman being born. Subsequent studies indicate that Korea has broken its own record and that the fertility rate has fallen to below one child per woman. The total fertility rate in South Korea sharply declined from 4.53 in 1970 to 2.06 in 1983, falling below the replacement level of 2.10. The low birth rate accelerated in the 2000s, with the fertility rate dropping to 1.48 in 2000, 1.23 in 2010, and reaching 0.72 in 2023.

The South Korean government offers a wide range of financial incentives to parents; however, many new parents, both mother and father, refuse to take full advantage of postpartum parental leave. Some fathers fear being ridiculed for taking "mom leave" while both working parents fear the stigma of "falling behind" in their professional careers. The South Korean corporate world is very unsympathetic to family needs.

Effective 1 January 2021, abortion has been decriminalized. Divorce is another deterrent to childbirth. Although divorce has been on the rise over the last 50 years, it hit families especially hard after the economic crisis (IMF crisis) in 1997; fathers abandoning their families because they could not financially support them.

=== Taiwan ===
In August 2011, Taiwan's government announced that its birth rate declined in the previous year, despite the fact that the government implemented approaches to increase fertility rates.

=== United Kingdom ===
In July 2011, the United Kingdom's Office for National Statistics (ONS) announced a 2.4 percent increase in live births in the United Kingdom in 2010. This is the highest birth rate in the UK in 40 years. However, the UK record year for births and birth rate remains 1920 (when the ONS reported over 957,000 births to a population of "around 40 million").

=== United States ===
After a relatively stable birth rate for thirty years, the number of live births per 100 women aged 15 to 44 resumed a decline beginning in 2008.

The fertility rate in the U.S. has been in a downward trend, and is now below the replacement rate of 2.1 births.

The US rate of natural increase—birth rate minus death rate—has declined, indicating slower population growth.

There has been a dramatic decline in birth rates in the United States between 2007 and 2020. The Great Recession appears to have contributed to the decline in the early period. A 2022 study did not identify any other economic, policy, or social factor that contributed to the decline. The decline may be due to shifting life priorities of recent cohorts that go through childbearing age, as there have been "changes in preferences for having children, aspirations for life, and parenting norms."

A study by Pew Research Center found evidence of a correlation between economic difficulties and fertility decline by race and ethnicity. Hispanics (particularly affected by the recession) have experienced the largest fertility decline, particularly compared to Caucasians. In 2008–2009 the birth rate declined 5.9 percent for Hispanic women, 2.4 percent for African American women and 1.6 percent for white women. The relatively large birth rate declines among Hispanics mirror their relatively large economic declines, in terms of jobs and wealth. According to the statistics using the data from National Centre for Health Statistics and U.S. Census Bureau, from 2007 to 2008, the employment rate among Hispanics declined by 1.6 percentage points, compared with declines of 0.7 points for whites. The unemployment rate shows a similar pattern—unemployment among Hispanics increased 2.0 percentage points from 2007 to 2008, while for whites the increase was 0.9 percentage points. A recent report from the Pew Hispanic Center revealed that Hispanics have also been the biggest losers in terms of wealth since the beginning of the recession, with Hispanic households losing 66% of their median wealth from 2005 to 2009. In comparison, black households lost 53% of their median wealth and white households lost only 16%.

Other factors (such as women's labor-force participation, contraceptive technology and public policy) make it difficult to determine how much economic change affects fertility. Research suggests that much of the fertility decline during an economic downturn is a postponement of childbearing, not a decision to have fewer (or no) children; people plan to "catch up" to their plans of bearing children when economic conditions improve. Younger women are more likely than older women to postpone pregnancy due to economic factors, since they have more years of fertility remaining.

In July 2011, the U.S. National Institutes of Health announced that the adolescent birth rate continues to decline. In 2013, teenage birth rates in the U.S. were at the lowest level in U.S. history. Teen birth rates in the U.S. have decreased from 1991 through 2012 (except for an increase from 2005 to 2007). The other aberration from this otherwise-steady decline in teen birth rates is the six percent decrease in birth rates for 15- to 19-year-olds between 2008 and 2009. Despite the decrease, U.S. teen birth rates remain higher than those in other developed nations. Racial differences affect teen birth and pregnancy rates: American Indian/Alaska Native, Hispanic, and non-Hispanic black teen pregnancy rates are more than double the non-Hispanic white teenage birth rate.

States strict in enforcing child support have up to 20 percent fewer unmarried births than states that are lax about getting unmarried dads to pay, the researchers found. Moreover, according to the results, if all 50 states in the United States had done at least as well in their enforcement efforts as the state ranked fifth from the top, that would have led to a 20 percent reduction in out-of-wedlock births.

The United States population growth is at a historical low level, mainly because the United States birth rates in the 2010s and 2020s are the lowest ever recorded. The low birth rates in the United States post-2010 can possibly be ascribed to the recession that started in 2008, which led families to postpone having children and fewer immigrants coming to the US. The US birth rates in 2010-2014 were not high enough to maintain the size of the U.S. population, according to The Economist. Since that period, the birth rate (births per 1,000 inhabitants) has further declined from roughly 12 to roughly 10.

== Factors affecting birth rate ==
Human Development Index map. Darker is higher. Countries with a higher HDI usually have a lower birth rate, known as the fertility-income paradox.

There are many factors that interact in complex ways, influencing the birth rates of a population. Developed countries have a lower birth rate than underdeveloped countries (see Income and fertility). A parent's number of children strongly correlates with the number of children that each person in the next generation will eventually have. Factors generally associated with increased fertility include religiosity, intention to have children, and maternal support. Factors generally associated with decreased fertility include wealth, education, female labor participation, urban residence, intelligence, increased female age, women's rights, access to family planning services and (to a lesser degree) increased male age. Many of these factors however are not universal, and differ by region and social class. For instance, at a global level, religion is correlated with increased fertility.

Reproductive health can also affect the birth rate, as untreated infections can lead to fertility problems, as can be seen in the "infertility belt" - a region that stretches across central Africa from the United Republic of Tanzania in the east to Gabon in the west, and which has a lower fertility than other African regions.

Child custody laws, affecting fathers' parental rights over their children from birth until child custody ends at age 18, may have an effect on the birth rate. U.S. states strict in enforcing child support have up to 20 percent fewer unmarried births than states that are lax about getting unmarried fathers to pay, the researchers found. Moreover, according to the results, if all 50 states in the United States had done at least as well in their enforcement efforts as the state ranked fifth from the top, that would have led to a 20 percent reduction in out-of-wedlock births.

Some scholars believe there exists a form of "cultural selection" that will significantly affect future demographics due to significant differences in birth rates between cultures, such as within certain religious groups, that cannot be explained by factors such as income. In the book Shall the Religious Inherit the Earth?, Eric Kaufmann argues that demographic trends point to religious fundamentalists greatly increasing as a share of the population over the next century. From the perspective of evolutionary psychology, it is expected that selection pressure should occur for whatever psychological or cultural traits maximize fertility.

== Crude birth rate ==
Crude birth rate is a measure of the number of live births occurring during the year, per 1,000 people in the population. It is normally used to predict population growth.

The Crude Birth Rate (CBR) is the number of live births per 1,000 people in a given year. According to statistics and study materials provided by BYJU'S, India's national CBR is approximately 19.5 births per 1,000 people, which has been steadily declining due to increased awareness and socio-economic changes. Key Demographic Statistics Definition: CBR indicates the total number of live births occurring during a year per 1,000 mid-year population. Formula: The CBR is calculated as:\(\text{CBR} = \frac{\text{Number of live births}}{\text{Estimated mid-year population}} \times 1,000\) 'India's Recent CBR: Recent Sample Registration System (SRS) data notes the national CBR stands at roughly 19.5. Total Fertility Rate (TFR): To give further context to birth rates, India's TFR (the average number of children born to a woman) has declined to 2.0 at the national level, which is below the replacement level of 2.1. Factors Influencing the CBRAge structure of the populationSocio-economic factors and education levelsAccess to family planning and modern contraceptivesGovernment programs and health initiatives (e.g., National Health Mission)

== See also ==
- List of countries by birth rate
