= Pension administration in the United States =

Pension administration in the United States is the act of performing various types of yearly service on an organizational retirement plan, such as a 401(k), profit sharing plan, defined benefit plan, or cash balance plan. Increasingly, employers are also implementing these plan types in combination arrangements for greater contribution potential, such as the pairing of a cash balance plan with some variety of 401(k). The pension administration ensures that an organizational retirement plan neither discriminates against lower-level employees nor becomes an abusive tax shelter. Stress tests include the average benefits test, average deferral percentage, and minimum coverage. Yearly pension administration work involves filing a Form 5500 with the Internal Revenue Service (IRS). Organizations such as the National Institute of Pension Administrators and the American Society of Pension Professionals and Actuaries offer several professional designations to those who do this work. Pension Administration firms often rely on financial brokers (or financial advisors) for their business prospects, although they do have other referral sources. Some pension administration firms assign financial advisory work to an internal unit and also accept referrals from an independent broker network. These brokers are often associated with firms like Raymond James, Edward Jones Investments and Morgan Stanley. The brokers may be employees of these firms or independent contractors. The plan assets of the organizational retirement plans in question sometimes reside on a trading platform that the administration firm control. More often, large financial institutions that provide a variety of investment options for plan participants hold the assets. Large firms include Principal Financial Group, John Hancock Insurance, ING Group and Mass Mutual. Pension administrators often coordinate with public accounting firms, as the Employee Retirement Income Security Act of 1974 (ERISA) requires plans with more than one hundred participants to undergo an independent audit each year. For defined benefit plans, the pension administration firm must employ an actuary to certify the plan's present and future benefit liabilities and compliance with IRS minimum funding standards. Pension administration firms with a large block of defined benefit plans often directly employ an actuary. Firms that only work on a small collection of defined benefit plans tend to retain the actuary as an independent contractor. The actuary completes contribution calculations for the plan and provides a Schedule SB so that the administrators may file the yearly Form 5500. Without this Schedule the yearly filing for a defined benefit plan would be incomplete. Other than the IRS, organizational retirement plan operation and maintenance falls under the regulation of the United States Department of Labor.

== Investment brokers ==
Ideally a pension administration firm forms alliances with a handful of investment brokers who specialize in organizational retirement plans. In return for business referrals, the administration firm supports the broker by providing specialized knowledge in organizational retirement plans. Investment Brokers are overseen by various organizations according to the licensure they carry, including an associated broker-dealer, Financial Industry Regulatory Authority (FINRA), and the appropriate state department of insurance.

== Classifications of pension administration firms ==
Pension administration firms operate in several different ways. Possibly the most common form is the third-party administrator (TPA). The TPA is an independent firm that does not sell associated investment products. A Pension administration firm can also be a division of a larger corporation engaged in the retirement plan business, such as with Principal Financial Group. The term "bundled" is sometimes used to refer to such an arrangement; the same company maintains the plan, manages investments, and provides custody services.

== Investment platforms ==
Traditional pension plans and some older defined contribution plans have one omnibus brokerage account where plan trustees invest participant funds for the plan participants' benefit. The participants themselves have no control over investment decisions. Traditional brokerage houses, such as Morgan Stanley or UBS, typically hold these accounts. Integrated platforms give participants access to their account balances and control over their investment elections through a technology system. A long list of firms offer such services.

== Technology ==
Beginning in the 1970s, technology has played a growing role in the pension administration business. Participant access platforms aside, software applications have also taken over many complicated actuarial calculations and statistical tests previously done by hand. Many business management tools also provide for workflow management and efficient client communication. Many activities previously carried out through U.S. Mail or United Parcel Service have moved online. In recent years, companies like Stax.ai have tailored AI-powered solutions to streamline administrative workflows, further enhancing efficiency in pension administration.

== Regulatory presence ==
New laws governing the operation of pension plans, such as the Pension Protection Act of 2006 and EGTRRA usually serve to address a significant industry problem, such as the lax oversight of 403(b) plans. These laws, which many companies who offer retirement plans and pension industry workers alike view as a nuisance, generate significant revenue beyond standard yearly retainer fees. Updating a retirement plan to comply with legal changes typically can generate $1–2,000 per event, and sometimes more depending on special circumstances.

== See also ==
- Pension
- American Society of Pension Professionals and Actuaries
