= Kwasha Lipton =

Former consulting firm

Coordinates: 40.854661°N 73.964685°W

- Type: employee benefits consulting firm
- Industry: benefit pension
- Founded: 1944
- Founder: H. Charles "Chick" Kwasha; Maurice Lipton
- Defunct: 2010
- Fate: acquired by Xerox
- Successor: Buck Consultants
- Headquarters: Fort Lee, New Jersey
- Area served: New York City; New Jersey

2100 North Central Road, Fort Lee, informally known as the Kwasha Lipton Building.

Kwasha Lipton was an employee benefits consulting firm located in Fort Lee, New Jersey.

== History ==
The firm was founded in 1944 by H. Charles "Chick" Kwasha and Maurice Lipton. Kwasha Lipton is best known for creating a type of defined benefit pension plan called a cash balance plan (CBP), which it designed for the employees of Bank of America in 1985. Kwasha Lipton implemented dozens of CBPs for its clients. CBP plans were ultimately adopted by companies throughout the United States. Some employees allege that the plans discriminate against older workers in violation of federal age discrimination law because of the way in which younger and older employees earn benefits under CBPs. Many cases that found plan sponsors liable most were later reversed by appellate courts. However to retroactively approve the plans Congress enacted the Pension Protection Act of 2006. This settled whether a CBP ab initio violated age discrimination. However, plan conversions that created CBPs out of existing traditional pensions by freezing accruals of older workers are still unsettled issues.

Kwasha Lipton was acquired in 1996 by Coopers & Lybrand and became the Kwasha Lipton Group of Coopers & Lybrand. Coopers & Lybrand then merged with Price Waterhouse on July 1, 1998 to form PricewaterhouseCoopers. Kwasha Lipton was combined with PricewaterhouseCoopers' other benefit consulting groups to create Unifi, which was sold to Mellon Financial. Mellon combined Unifi with its Buck Consultants subsidiary to create Mellon HR Solutions, which was sold to Affiliated Computer Services (ACS) for $405 million in 2005 and renamed Buck Consultants.

In 2010, ACS was sold to Xerox for $6.4 billion. Buck Consultants was later rebranded as "Buck Consultants at Xerox".

== Building ==
Kwasha Lipton owned and occupied a building in Fort Lee, New Jersey. It is the first office building visible to the North after passing from New York City to New Jersey across the George Washington Bridge, and it has views of the bridge and the Manhattan skyline. The 13-story building offers 139,000 square feet (12,900 m^{2}) of office space, and was sold in July 2005 for $33.7 million. ACS remains the primary occupant.
