= American Society of Pension Professionals & Actuaries =

Association for retirement plan professionals

- ASPPA logo
- Formation: 1966
- Type: Professional body
- Headquarters: Arlington, VA
- Location: United States of America
- Members: 9,000 +
- Official language: English
- President: Amanda Iverson
- Website: http://www.asppa-net.org

The American Society of Pension Professionals & Actuaries (ASPPA) is a national organization for career retirement plan professionals. The membership consists of the many disciplines supporting retirement income management and benefits policy. ASPPA represents those who have made a career of retirement plan and pension policy work.

ASPPA was founded in 1966 originally as an actuarial organization. Since then ASPPA has expanded and diversified its membership to include all types of pension professionals — from actuaries, consultants, and administrators to insurance professionals, financial planners, accountants, attorneys, and human resource managers.

== Exam-based Professional Credentials ==
ASPPA offers the following examination-based professional credentials:

- Qualified 401(k) Administrator (QKA)
- Qualified 401(k) Consultant (QKC)
- Qualified Pension Administrator (QPA)
- Certified Pension Consultant (CPC)

The examination requirements for the above certifications include proficiency in the following subject areas:

- Retirement Plan Fundamentals
- Plan Financial Consulting
- Administration Issues of Defined contribution plans
- Administration Issues of Defined benefit plans
- Financial and Fiduciary Aspects of Qualified Pension Plans.

== Conferences ==
ASPPA provides or co-sponsors more than 15 major conferences in the retirement plan industry throughout the year.

== See also ==
- Employee Retirement Income Security Act
- Retirement plan
- Retirement plans in the United States
- Human resources
- Human resource consulting
- Enrolled Actuary
