= Retirement plans in the United States =

Average balances of retirement accounts, for households having such accounts, exceed median net worth across all age groups. For those 65 and over, 11.6% of retirement accounts have balances of at least $1 million, more than twice that of the $407,581 average (shown). Those 65 and over have a median net worth of about $250,000 (shown), about a quarter of the group's average (not shown).

A retirement plan is a financial arrangement designed to replace employment income upon retirement. These plans may be set up by employers, insurance companies, trade unions, the government, or other institutions. Congress has expressed a desire to encourage responsible retirement planning by granting favorable tax treatment to a wide variety of plans. Federal tax aspects of retirement plans in the United States are based on provisions of the Internal Revenue Code and the plans are regulated by the Department of Labor under the provisions of the Employee Retirement Income Security Act (ERISA).

In March 2025, 72 percent of private-industry workers had access to employer-sponsored retirement benefits. Defined-contribution plans were available to 70 percent, while defined-benefit plans were available to 14 percent.

== Types of retirement plans ==
Retirement plans are classified as either defined benefit plans or defined contribution plans, depending on how benefits are determined.

In a defined benefit (or pension) plan, benefits are calculated using a fixed formula that typically factors in final pay and service with an employer, and payments are made from a trust fund specifically dedicated to the plan. Separate accounts for each participant do not exist.

By contrast, in a defined contribution plan, each participant has an account, and the benefit for the participant is dependent upon both the amount of money contributed into the account and the performance of the investments purchased with the funds contributed to the account.

Some types of retirement plans, such as cash balance plans, combine features of both defined benefit and defined contribution schemes.

=== Defined contribution plans ===
According to Internal Revenue Code Section 414, a defined contribution plan is an employer-sponsored plan with an individual account for each participant. The accrued benefit from such a plan is solely attributable to contributions made into an individual account and investment gains on those funds, less any losses and expense charges. The contributions are invested (e.g., in the stock market), and the returns on the investment are credited to or deducted from the individual's account. Upon retirement, the participant's account is used to provide retirement benefits, often through the purchase of an annuity. Defined contribution plans have become more widespread over recent years and are now the dominant form of plan in the private sector. The number of defined benefit plans in the U.S. has been steadily declining, as more employers see pension funding as a financial risk they can avoid by freezing the plan and instead offering a defined contribution plan.

Examples of defined contribution plans include individual retirement account (IRA), 401(k), and profit sharing plans. In such plans, the participant is responsible for selecting the types of investments toward which the funds in the retirement plan are allocated. This may range from choosing one of a small number of pre-determined mutual funds to selecting individual stocks or other investments (such as bonds). Most self-directed retirement plans are characterized by certain tax advantages. The funds in such plans may not be withdrawn without penalty until the investor reaches retirement age, which is typically the year in which taxpayer reaches 59.5 years of age.

Money contributed can be from employee salary deferrals, employer contributions, or employer matching contributions. Defined contribution plans are subject to Internal Revenue Code Section 415 limits on how much can be contributed. As of 2015, the total deferral amount including the employee and employer contribution is capped at $53,000. The employee-only amount is $18,000 for 2015, but a plan can permit participants who are age 50 or older to make "catch-up" contributions of up to an additional $6,000.

=== Defined benefit plans ===
Commonly referred to as a pension in the US, a defined benefit plan pays benefits from a trust fund using a specific formula set forth by the plan sponsor. In other words, the plan defines a benefit that will be paid upon retirement. The statutory definition of defined benefit encompasses all pension plans that are not defined contribution and therefore do not have individual accounts.

While this catch-all definition has been interpreted by the courts to capture some hybrid pension plans like cash balance (CB) plans and pension equity plans (PEP), most pension plans offered by large businesses or government agencies are final average pay (FAP) plans, under which the monthly benefit is equal to the number of years worked multiplied by the member's salary at retirement multiplied by a factor known as the accrual rate. At a minimum, benefits are payable in normal form as a Single Life Annuity (SLA) for single participants or as a Qualified Joint and Survivor Annuity (QJSA) for married participants. Both normal forms are paid at Normal Retirement Age (usually 65) and may be actuarially adjusted for early or late commencement. Other optional forms of payment, such as lump sum distributions, may be available but are not required.

The cash balance plan typically offers a lump sum at and often before normal retirement age. However, as is the case with all defined benefit plans, a cash balance plan must also provide the option of receiving the benefit as a life annuity. The amount of the annuity benefit must be definitely determinable as per IRS regulation 1.412-1.

Defined benefit plans may be either funded or unfunded. In a funded plan, contributions from the employer and participants are invested into a trust fund dedicated solely to paying benefits to retirees under a given plan. The future returns on the investments and the future benefits to be paid are not known in advance, so there is no guarantee that a given level of contributions will meet future obligations. Therefore, fund assets and liabilities are regularly reviewed by an actuary in a process known as valuation. A defined benefit plan is required to maintain adequate funding if it is to remain qualified.

In an unfunded plan, no funds are set aside for the specific purpose of paying benefits. The benefits to be paid are met immediately by contributions to the plan or by general assets. Most government-run retirement plans, including Social Security, are unfunded, with benefits being paid directly out of current taxes and Social Security contributions. Most nonqualified plans are also unfunded.

=== Hybrid and cash balance plans ===
Hybrid plan designs combine the features of defined benefit and defined contribution plan designs. In general, they are treated as defined benefit plans for tax, accounting, and regulatory purposes. As with defined benefit plans, investment risk is largely borne by the plan sponsor. As with defined contribution designs, plan benefits are expressed in the terms of a notional account balance, and are usually paid as cash balances upon termination of employment. These features make them more portable than traditional defined benefit plans and perhaps more attractive to a highly mobile workforce. A typical hybrid design is the cash balance plan, where the employee's notional account balance grows by some defined rate of interest and annual employer contribution.

In the United States, conversions from traditional plan to hybrid plan designs have been controversial. Upon conversion, plan sponsors are required to retrospectively calculate employee account balances, and if the employee's actual vested benefit under the old design is more than the account balance, the employee enters a period of wear away. During this period, the employee would be eligible to receive the already accrued benefit under the old formula, but all future benefits are accrued under the new plan design. Eventually, the accrued benefit under the new design exceeds the grandfathered amount under the old design. To the participant, however, it appears as if there is a period where no new benefits are accrued. Hybrid designs also typically eliminate the more generous early retirement provisions of traditional pensions.

Because younger workers have more years in which to accrue interest and pay credits than those approaching retirement age, critics of cash balance plans have called the new designs discriminatory. On the other hand, the new designs may better meet the needs of a modern workforce and actually encourage older workers to remain at work, since benefit accruals continue at a constant pace as long as an employee remains on the job. As of 2008, the courts have generally rejected the notion that cash balance plans discriminate based on age, while the Pension Protection Act of 2006 offers relief for most hybrid plans on a prospective basis.

Although a cash balance plan is technically a defined benefit plan designed to allow workers to evaluate the economic worth their pension benefit in the manner of a defined contribution plan (i.e., as an account balance), the target benefit plan is a defined contribution plan designed to express its projected impact in terms of lifetime income as a percent of final salary at retirement (i.e., as an annuity amount). For example, a target benefit plan may mimic a typical defined benefit plan offering 1.5% of salary per year of service times the final 3-year average salary. Actuarial assumptions like 5% interest, 3% salary increases and the UP84 Life Table for mortality are used to calculate a level contribution rate that would create the needed lump sum at retirement age. The problem with such plans is that the flat rate could be low for young entrants and high for old entrants. While this may appear unfair, the skewing of benefits to the old worker is a feature of most traditional defined benefit plans, and any attempt to match it would reveal this backloading feature.

=== Requirement of permanence ===
To guard against tax abuse in the United States, the Internal Revenue Service (IRS) has promulgated rules that require that pension plans be permanent as opposed to a temporary arrangement used to capture tax benefits. Regulation 1.401-1(b)(2) states that "[t]hus, although the employer may reserve the right to change or terminate the plan, and to discontinue contributions thereunder, the abandonment of the plan for any reason other than business necessity within a few years after it has taken effect will be evidence that the plan from its inception was not a bona fide program for the exclusive benefit of employees in general. Especially will this be true if, for example, a pension plan is abandoned soon after pensions have been fully funded for persons in favor of whom discrimination is prohibited..." The IRS would have grounds to disqualify the plan retroactively, even if the plan sponsor initially got a favorable determination letter.

=== Qualified retirement plans ===
Qualified plans receive favorable tax treatment and are regulated by ERISA. The technical definition of qualified does not agree with the commonly used distinction. For example, 403(b) plans are not considered qualified plans, but are treated and taxed almost identically.

The term qualified has special meaning regarding defined benefit plans. The IRS defines strict requirements a plan must meet in order to receive favorable tax treatment, including:

- A plan must offer life annuities in the form of a Single Life Annuity (SLA) and a Qualified Joint & Survivor Annuity (QJSA).
- A plan must maintain sufficient funding levels.
- A plan must be administered according to the plan document.
- Benefits are required to commence at retirement age (usually age 65 if no longer working, or age 70 1/2 if still employed).
- Once earned, benefits may not be forfeited.
- A plan may not discriminate in favor of highly compensated employees.
- A plan must be insured by the PBGC.

Failure to meet IRS requirements can lead to plan disqualification, which carries with it enormous tax consequences.

=== SIMPLE IRAs ===
A SIMPLE IRA is a type of Individual Retirement Account (IRA) that is provided by an employer. It is similar to a 401(k) but offers simpler and less costly administration rules. Like a 401(k) plan, the SIMPLE IRA is funded by a pre-tax salary reduction. However, contribution limits for SIMPLE plans are lower than for most other types of employer-provided retirement plans.

=== SEP IRAs ===
A Simplified Employee Pension Individual Retirement Account, or SEP IRA, is a variation of the Individual Retirement Account. SEP IRAs are adopted by business owners to provide retirement benefits for the business owners and their employees. There are no significant administration costs for self-employed person with no employees. If the self-employed person does have employees, all employees must receive the same benefits under a SEP plan. Because SEP accounts are treated as IRAs, funds can be invested the same way as is the case for any other IRA.

=== Keogh or HR10 plans ===
Keogh plans are full-fledged pension plans for the self-employed. Named for U.S. Representative Eugene James Keogh of New York, they are sometimes called HR10 plans.

=== Nonqualified plans ===
Plans that do not meet the guidelines required to receive favorable tax treatment are considered nonqualified and are exempt from the restrictions placed on qualified plans. They are typically used to provide additional benefits to key or highly paid employees, such as executives and officers. Examples include SERP (Supplemental Executive Retirement Plans) and 457(f) plans.

== Contrasting types of retirement plans ==
Advocates of Defined contribution plan point out that each employee has the ability to tailor the investment portfolio to his or her individual needs and financial situation, including the choice of how much to contribute, if anything at all. However, others state that these apparent advantages could also hinder some workers who might not possess the financial savvy to choose the correct investment vehicles or have the discipline to voluntarily contribute money to retirement accounts.

== Portability and valuation ==
Defined contribution plans have actual balances of which workers can know the value with certainty by simply checking the record of the balance. There is no legal requirement that the employer allow the former worker take his money out to roll over into an IRA, though it is relatively uncommon in the U.S. not to allow this (and many companies such as Fidelity run numerous TV ads encouraging individuals to transfer their old plans into current ones).

Because the lump sum actuarial present value of a former worker's vested accrued benefit is uncertain, the IRS, under section 417(e) of the Internal Revenue Code, specifies the interest and mortality figures that must be used. This has caused some employers as in the Berger versus Xerox case in the 7th Circuit (Richard A. Posner was the judge who wrote the opinion) with cash balance plans to have a higher liability for employers for a lump sum than was in the employee's "notional" or "hypothetical" account balance.

When the interest credit rate exceeds the mandated section 417(e) discounting rate, the legally mandated lump sum value payable to the employee [if the plan sponsor allows for pre-retirement lump sums] would exceed the notional balance in the employee's cash balance account. This has been colourfully dubbed the "Whipsaw" in actuarial parlance. The Pension Protection Act signed into law on August 17, 2006 contained added provisions for these types of plans allowing the distribution of the cash balance account as a lump sum.

=== Portability: practical difference, not a legal difference ===
A practical difference is that a defined contribution plan's assets generally remain with the employee (generally, amounts contributed by the employee and earnings on them remain with the employee, but employer contributions and earnings on them do not vest with the employee until a specified period has elapsed), even if he or she transfers to a new job or decides to retire early. By contrast, in many countries defined benefit pension benefits are typically lost if the worker fails to serve the requisite number of years with the same company. Self-directed accounts from one employer may usually be 'rolled-over' to another employer's account or converted from one type of account to another in these cases.

Because defined contribution plans have actual balances, employers can simply write a check because the amount of their liability at termination of employment which may be decades before actual normal (65) retirement date of the plan is known with certainty. There is no legal requirement that the employer allow the former worker take his money out to roll over into an IRA, though it is relatively uncommon in the US not to allow this.

Just as there is no legal requirement to give portability to a Defined contribution plan, there is no mandated ban on portability for defined benefit plans. However, because the lump sum actuarial present value of a former worker's vested accrued benefit is uncertain, the mandate under in section 417(e) of the Internal Revenue Code specifies the interest and mortality figures that must be used. This uncertainty has limited the practical portability of defined benefit plans.

=== Investment risk borne by employee or employer ===
It is commonly said that the employee bears investment risk for defined contribution plans, while the employer bears that risk in defined benefit plans. This is true for practically all cases, but pension law in the United States does not require that employees bear investment risk. The law only provides a section 404(c) exemption under ERISA from fiduciary liability if the employer provides the mandated investment choices and gives employees sufficient control to customize his pension investment portfolio appropriate to his risk tolerance.

=== PBGC insurance: a legal difference ===
ERISA does not provide insurance from the Pension Benefit Guaranty Corporation (PBGC) for defined contribution plans, but cash balance plans do get such insurance because they, like all ERISA-defined benefit plans, are covered by the PBGC.

Plans may also be either employer-provided or individual plans. Most types of retirement plans are employer-provided, though individual retirement accounts (IRAs) are very common.

== Tax advantages ==
Most retirement plans (the exception being most non qualified plans) offer significant tax advantages. Most commonly the money contributed to the account is not taxed as income to the employee at the time of the contribution. In the case of employer provided plans, however, the employer is able to receive a tax deduction for the amount contributed as if it were regular employee compensation. This is known as pre-tax contributions, and the amounts allowed to be contributed vary significantly among various plan types. The other significant advantage is that the assets in the plan are allowed to grow through investing without the taxpayer being taxed on the annual growth year by year. Once the money is withdrawn it is taxed fully as income for the year of the withdrawal. There are many restrictions on contributions, especially with 401(k) and defined benefit plans. The restrictions are designed to make sure that highly compensated employees do not gain too much tax advantage at the expense of lesser paid employees.

Currently two types of plan, the Roth IRA and the Roth 401(k), offer tax advantages that are essentially reversed from most retirement plans. Contributions to Roth IRAs and Roth 401(k)s must be made with money that has been taxed as income. After meeting the various restrictions, withdrawals from the account are received by the taxpayer tax-free.

=== EGTRRA and later changes ===
The Economic Growth and Tax Relief Reconciliation Act of 2001 (EGTRRA) brought significant changes to retirement plans, generally easing restrictions on the ability of the taxpayer to roll money from one type of account to the other, and increasing contributions limits. Most of the changes were designed to phase in over a period of 4 to 10 years.

== History of pensions in the United States ==
- 1717: The Presbyterian Church creates a Fund for Pious Uses to provide for retired ministers.
- 1884: Baltimore and Ohio Railroad establishes the first pension plan by a major employer, allowing workers at age 65 who had worked for the railroad for at least 10 years to retire and receive benefits ranging from 20 to 35% of wages.
- 1889: The American Express Company creates the first pension plan in the United States.
- The Revenue Act of 1913, passed following the passage of the 16th amendment to the constitution which permitted income taxation, recognized the tax exempt nature of pension trusts. At the time, several large pension trusts were already in existence- including the pension trust for ministers of the Anglican Church in the United States.
- 1920: Civil Service Retirement System
- 1924: The Presbyterian Church, USA, creates its current pension program
- 1940s: General Motors chairman Charles Erwin Wilson designed GM's first modern pension fund. He said that it should invest in all company shares, not just GM.
- 1963: Studebaker terminated its underfunded pension plan, leaving employees with no legal recourse for their pension promises.
- 1974: ERISA – imposed reporting and disclosure obligations and minimum standards for participation, vesting, accrual and funding on U.S. plan sponsors, established fiduciary standards applicable to plan administrators and asset managers, established the Pension Benefit Guaranty Corporation (PBGC) to ensure benefits for participants in terminated defined benefit plans, updated the Internal Revenue Code rules for tax qualification, and authorized Employee Stock Ownership Plans ("ESOPs") and Individual Retirement Accounts ("IRAs"). Championed by Senators Jacob K. Javits, Harrison A. Williams, Russell Long, and Gaylord Nelson, and by Representatives John Dent and John Erlenborn.
- 1985: The First Cash Balance Plan - Kwasha Lipton creates it by amending the plan document of Bank of America pension plan. The linguistic move was to avoid mentioning actual individual accounts but using the words hypothetical account or notional account.
- 1991: A Magazine article claims that pension- and retirement funds own 40% of American common stock and represent $2.5 trillion in assets.
- Growth and Decline of Defined Benefit Pension Plans in the United States. In 1980 there were approximately 250,000 qualified defined benefit pension plans covered by the Pension Benefit Guaranty Corporation. By 2005, there are less than 80,000 qualified plans.
- Fewer and Fewer: Defined benefit plans continue to dwindle, becoming exception rather than rule. As of 2011, only 10% of private employers offered pension plans, accounting for 18% of the private workforce.

== See also ==
- Retirement plan
- Individual retirement account (IRA)
- Public employee pension plans in the United States
- 401(k)
- 403(b) - Similar to the 401(k), but for educational, religious, public healthcare, or non-profit workers
- 401(a) and 457 plans - For employees of state and local governments and certain tax-exempt entities
- Roth IRA - Similar to the IRA, but funded with after-tax dollars, with distributions being tax-free
- Roth 401(k) - Introduced in 2006; a 401(k) plan with the tax features of a Roth IRA
