= Collective trust fund =

Legal trust

A collective trust fund or collective investment trust (CIT) is a legal trust administered by a bank or trust company that combines assets for multiple investors who meet specific requirements set forth in the fund's declaration of trust. Typically, a collective trust pools assets from corporate and governmental profit sharing, pension and stock bonus plans, and charitable and other tax-exempt trusts. While operating in many respects similar to a mutual fund, a collective trust is not regulated by the U.S. Securities and Exchange Commission, but rather is established under Title 12, Section 9.18(a)(2) of the Code of Federal Regulations of the Office of the Comptroller of the Currency (OCC), a division within the U.S. Department of the Treasury.

CITs have existed since 1927. Their asset size and significance in retirement and pension sectors have grown substantially in recent years. Estimated assets in collective trusts as of the end of 2016 exceeded $1.4 trillion. In many ways, CITs are similar to mutual funds, and thus, have become especially important in the defined contribution/401(k) market, as of 2016 growing to over $1.5 trillion in assets and comprising over 20% of defined contribution plan assets.

== Overview ==
Collective trusts are commonly used for defined benefit plans and, when daily valuation is possible, for defined contribution plans. Collective trusts generally are excluded from the definition of an "investment company" under Section 3(c)(11) of the Investment Company Act of 1940, and interests in these funds are generally exempt from registration under Section 3(a)(2) of the Securities Act of 1933. In addition, transactions involving interests in collective trusts generally do not require an entity to register as a broker-dealer under Section 15(a) of the Securities Exchange Act of 1934. However, when collective trusts are composed of IRA assets or so-called "Keogh plans", or marketed to the public, some or all of these securities law exclusions and exemptions may not be available; in these situations, registration under one or more federal securities laws could be required.

Although they have been available for decades, early versions of collective trusts provided investors with little access to underlying holdings data and were valued infrequently, typically only once per quarter. Consequently, mutual funds, offering investor-friendly features like daily valuations and greater transparency, quickly overshadowed collective trusts. However, given the later focus on retirement plan fees and full disclosure, and in light of technological advances, collective trusts have gained market share in the defined benefit and defined contribution markets.

Collective trusts pursue a wide variety of investment strategies across the equity and fixed income spectrum. These strategies may be passive (e.g., indexed or model-driven) or actively managed (e.g., pursuing growth or value strategies). In addition, in recent years collective trusts have pursued their investment strategies by employing more innovative investment techniques, such as investing in other investment vehicles or using more innovative investment instruments, such as exchange-traded funds. In addition to equity strategies, collective trusts also pursue a wide range of fixed income strategies, including actively managed strategies, passive strategies and others. Fixed income collective trust funds typically invest primarily in various types of debt instruments, such as treasury bonds, treasury bills, corporate bonds, sovereign government bonds, secured and unsecured loans, and different types of derivatives based on these instruments.

== Pros and cons ==
Collective trusts offer several advantages over other investment vehicles, including economies of scale, low operating costs, quick establishment, flexible pricing and fees, diversification, and access to investment expertise. Disadvantages include less transparency than traditional mutual funds, difficulty tracking performance, and less oversight of management.

Because collective trusts are typically only available in an employer-sponsored retirement plan, an individual retirement account generally will not allow them.
