= Kendriya Vihar =

Coordinates: 19.04°N 73.08°E

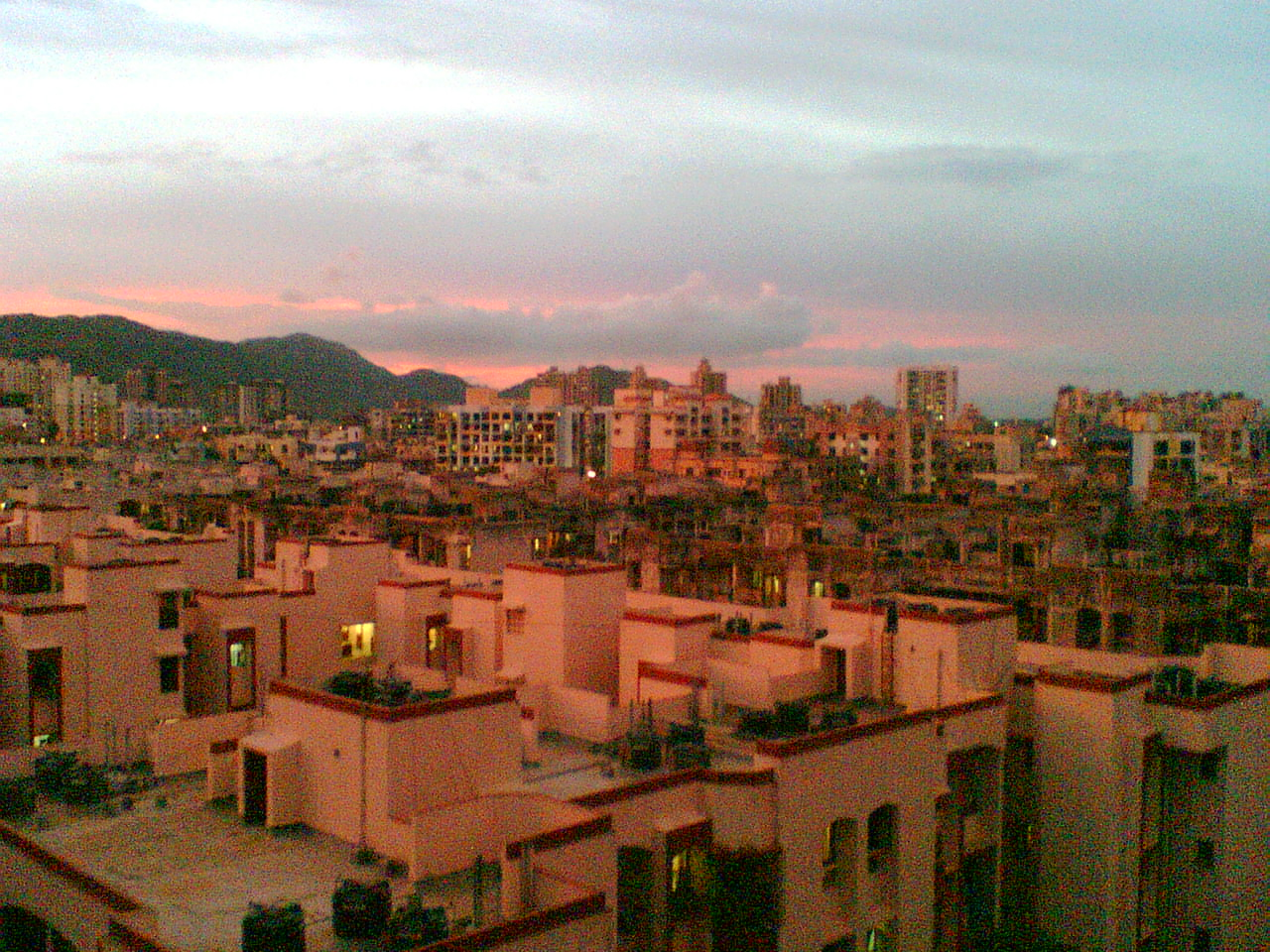
Kendriya Vihar at Kharghar

Kendriya Vihar, is a housing complex in Kharghar, Navi Mumbai developed by CGEWHO (Central Government Employees Welfare Housing Organisation), an autonomous society of Central Government, which takes care of housing of Central Government employees across India. It is the biggest project of CGEWHO and is one of the best colonies in Navi Mumbai. Mostly central government present and retired employees reside there. It has open space and recreational facilities such as gardens, children play area, etc.

CGEWHO build the Kendriya Vihar complex and sold the flats to central government employees. It covers 19.03 acres of land which is centrally located in Sector 11. It is 15 minutes walking distance from Kharghar Railway Station and one of the first complexes in Kharghar.

It has a federation of six registered societies. There are 1230 flats in Kendriya Vihar: 1, 2, and 3 bhk flats.

== Characteristics ==
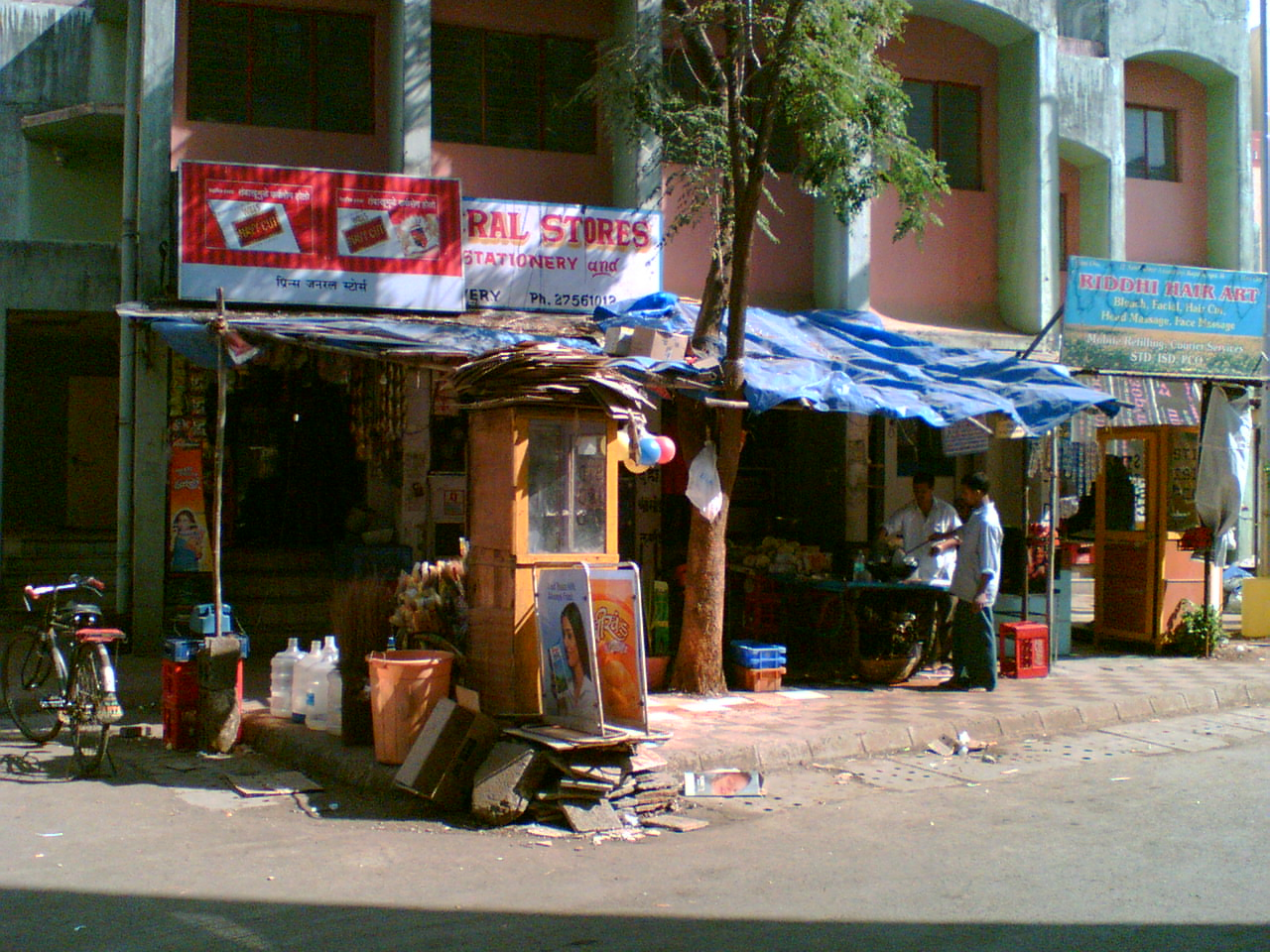
Grocery shop inside Kendriya Vihar

Kendriya Vihar has a Plot size of 77000 sq metrea ie 19 acres and is the Second biggest Tender Plot in Navi Mumbai. Its website address is wwww.kendriyavihar.com

It was constructed by CGEWHO and handed over to residents of Kendriya Vihar in 1998. It got OC in 1998 and 6 societies and a federation was registered in 2002.

It has 86 Bldgs and 1230 Flats and one community centre with shops. In community centre one can play Badminton and have Functions and events also. it has two samll halls on first floor where small events and functions can be taken.

Its has AA Type(1 RK), A Type (1 BHK), AH Type (2 BHK of 12 floors), B Type(2 BHK of 3 floors), BH Type(2 BHK of 7 floors) and C and CH Type od 3 floors and 7 floors respectively.

It has 2 Gates for Entry and Exit.

== Location ==
Kendriya Vihar, Sector 11, Kharghar, Navi Mumbai 410210

== Transportation ==
Navi Mumbai Municipal Transport (NMMT) services route 26 and 29 from Thane via Belapur, route 57 from Benton via Vashi, route 44 from Dombivali via Turbhe, route 52 from Belapur Railway Station and route 53 and 54 from Kharghar station. Autorickshaw regularly ply between Kendriya Vihar and Kharghar.

BEST bus route 504 from Wadala to Jalvayu Vihar (Kharghar). State Transport (ST) bus from Dadar to Panvel stops at Hiranandani Complex or Kharghar bridge.

Harbour line local train CST to Panvel through Kharghar station. Kendriya Vihar is also near to Proposed International Airport near Panvel. There is also an upcoming Metro station is opposite to Kendriya Vihar.
