= SPHR =

SPHR may refer to:

- Solidarity for Palestinian Human Rights
- Senior Professional in Human Resources, a certificate rating by the Human Resource Certification Institute
