= Joint Board for the Enrollment of Actuaries =

The Joint Board for the Enrollment of Actuaries licenses actuaries to perform a variety of actuarial tasks required of pension plans in the United States by the Employee Retirement Income Security Act of 1974 (ERISA). The Joint Board consists of five members – three appointed by the Secretary of the Treasury and two by the Secretary of Labor – as well as a sixth non-voting member representing the Pension Benefit Guaranty Corporation.

The Joint Board administers two examinations to prospective Enrolled Actuaries. After an individual passes the two exams and completes sufficient relevant professional experience, she or he becomes an Enrolled Actuary.

== See also ==
- Title 20 of the Code of Federal Regulations

== Sources ==
- Joint Board for the Enrollment of Actuaries
