= PHR =

PHR might refer to:

- Parts per Hundred Rubber, a measure used by rubber chemists to depict what amount of certain ingredients are needed, especially pre-vulcanization
- Personal health record, an individual's health and medical information as collected by the individual
- Physicians for Human Rights, an international non-governmental organization
- Physicians for Human Rights–Israel, an Israeli–Palestinian NGO based in Jaffa
- Principality of Hutt River, a former independent micronation on the Western Australian continent.
- Professional in Human Resources, a certification for human resource professionals
- Public Health Reports, a medical journal
- Pahari-Pothwari (ISO 639-3 phr), an Indo-Aryan language
