= Human resource consulting =

Consulting on corporate people management

The human resource consulting industry has emerged from management consulting and addresses human resource management tasks and decisions.

The Expert Resource Consultant suggests solutions based on expertise and experience, and assists in their implementation. The role is very typical in information benchmarking and design consulting (see examples of actual design practices in the subsequent section below).

The Process/People consultant assists in searching for solutions with methods that facilitate and raise creativity of the client company so that they will be able to implement solutions themselves. The role is traditionally demonstrated by organizational development and change consulting.

== Core fields in practice ==
The following are core fields around which most human resource consultancies are based:

Employee engagement: Measure employee engagement levels through surveys and interviews, define and improve performance in employee engagement and retention. While this area of HR consulting is necessarily broad, encapsulating total rewards strategy, employee performance management, leadership transformation, and organisation structure design, most companies do have very specialised independent practices.

Compensation: Design and manage compensation programs related to basic salary, bonuses, and stock plans. Evaluation of positions and building of salary structures, bonus plans and stock plans for clients are common. Specialisations are often based on employee types (e.g. Executive compensation consultants and sales compensation consultants.

Employee benefits: Optimize benefit plan design and administration (inclusive of health-related benefits) by assessing competitiveness and effectiveness of benefit plans (analytics and design), and cost-effectiveness and quality of vendors (brokerage).

Actuarial and retirement: Provide actuarial and administration services to manage cost and effectiveness of retirement programs, including defined benefit and defined contribution plans.

Mergers and acquisitions: Conduct human capital due diligence, coordinate and administer cross-functional activities during execution, including payroll and Human resource management system technology. Align organizational cultures and work styles during post-merger integration.

Talent mobility: Provides the insight and execution for full international expatriates (usually for executives) or local plus (partial-package expatriates), from pre-move informative guide, to post-move expat management program.

Other services may also include legal counseling, global initiatives, investments consulting, and the implementation of human resource technologies to facilitate human capital management.

== Companies in the field ==
Human resource consultancies vary in their ranges of services and sizes, with many consultants and academicians breaking off to form their own practices. In 2007, there were 950 human resource consultancies globally, constituting a US$18.4 billion market.

As of 2015, Korn Ferry, Mercer, Towers Watson, Aon Hewitt, and Buck Consultants were referred to as the largest HR consulting firms. While the MBB and Big Fours may not have the largest HR Consulting practice, some of them are known to be among the best in this field. According to Vault.com, a website that provides career information by industry and by Fortune 1000 company, the top 10 HR Consulting Firms to work for in 2023 are as follows:

| Rank | Company |
|---|---|
| 1 | Deloitte Consulting LLP |
| 2 | Korn Ferry |
| 3 | Mercer LLC |
| 4 | Boston Consulting Group |
| 5 | Accenture |
| 6 | Bain & Company |
| 7 | Willis Towers Watson |
| 8 | KPMG LLP (Advisory) |
| 9 | Ernst & Young (Consulting Practice) NA |
| 10 | PwC Advisory/Strategy& |

== Qualifications and certifications ==
Many human resource consultants have specialized qualifications or certifications, such as:

- Accountancy: ACCA, CA, CPA, CCA
- Actuarial: EA, ASA, FSA, MAAA, FIA, FIAA, FFA
- Educational: MS in Management/HR/Industrial Organizational psychology, MBA, Ph.D. in Management, DBA, J.D.
- Finance: CFA
- General consulting: CMC
- HR consulting: Associate, Member or Fellow Chartered Institute of Personnel & Development (Assoc. CIPD, MCIPD or FCIPD), Fellow Australian Human Resources Institute (FAHRI), Certified Human Resources Consultant (CHRC), Professional in Human Resources (PHR), SPHR, GPHR by HRCI, USA, SHRM-CP or SHRM-SCP by SHRM, USA
- Health and benefits: CEBS, CBP
- Compensation: CCP (Certified Compensation Professional)
- Human resources: SHRM (US), PHR and SPHR (Canada), FCIPD, MCIPD, PGDHR, DHR (UK), Registered Professional Recruiter (RPR) (Canada), CIPM (Nigeria)
- Science: Behaviour(Psychology)

== See also ==
- Consulting firm
- Industrial and organizational psychology
