= Scanlon plan =

Employee participation in company management

The Scanlon plan is a gainsharing program which combines leadership, total workforce education, and widespread employee participation with a reward system linked to organization performance. It has been used by a variety of public and private companies with varying amounts of success.

== Origin ==
The first Scanlon plan was instituted by Joseph Norbert Scanlon (1897–1956) a steelworker, cost accountant, professional boxer, local union president, Acting Director of the Steelworkers Research Department, and Lecturer at the Massachusetts Institute of Technology (MIT). As the local union president of the steel mill in which he was employed, he witnessed the depressed economy of the 1930s. His co-workers wanted increased wages, his company had barely survived the depression. He was advised by the Steelworkers International to see if he could harness the energy and talents of the workers to save the company. Scanlon set up joint union/management committees to solve organizational problems. The committees became successful and Scanlon was soon asked to help other organizations in trouble. His success led him to become Acting Director of the Steelworker's Research Department. Scanlon became active in setting up many labor/management committees in support of War production for WWII.

Scanlon's work with joint union/management committees convinced him of the power of cooperation and he was an advocate of working with management in the Steelworkers. At the end of WWII the faction advocating a cooperative approach in labor/management was displaced by those advocating a return to traditional adversarial relations in the Steelworkers. Scanlon accepted an invitation by Douglas McGregor to become a Lecturer at MIT where he remained until his death.

At MIT, Scanlon continued to develop his ideas about labor/management cooperation and organizational improvement. It was at MIT that the term "Scanlon Plan" was coined by accident. There were two conferences going on at MIT and signs were needed to guide attendees. Thus those headed to Scanlon's event were directed to the Scanlon Plan and the name stuck.

The original labor/management teams that Scanlon created did not include a bonus. Early on they were created to save distressed companies or to encourage war production. Scanlon believed that much distrust existed between labor and management because there was a lack of information sharing. He believed that, given information about the company and a chance to participate in helping solve problems, the average worker would contribute to the success of the company. Scanlon did not believe in what he called "the economic man theory." Piece work systems and ideas about human motivation at the time reduced the worker to something that was thought to be only motivated by money. Scanlon believed that people were motivated by many things besides money—a chance to make a difference, pride, fellowship, etc. Eventually Scanlon included an organizational bonus system as part of the plan. Often these systems replaced piece work systems that were common at that time. Douglas McGregor would study Scanlon's clients to develop his Theory Y vs Theory X. Scanlon Plans were considered one of the best ways to develop Theory Y.

Scanlon's work with the Admanson Company was featured in a Life Magazine article "Every man a Capitalist" by John Chamberlain, December 1946. His work with Lapointe was featured in a Fortune article "Enterprise for Everyman" by John Davenport, January 1950. Time Magazine wrote that Joe Scanlon was the most sought after consultant of his time in "Management: The Scanlon Plan, September 1955.

Two of Scanlon's colleagues carried on his work - Fred Lesieur who he had met at the Lapointe Tool Company and Dr. Carl F. Frost at MIT. Carl Frost would take the ideas west to Michigan State University which became a center for Scanlon thought and practice for many years. Frost would also create the Frost/Scanlon Principles of Identity, Participation, Equity and Competence. Frost's clients would create the Scanlon Plan Association which today is the Scanlon Leadership Network, a nonprofit Network of Organizations with Scanlon Plans. Frost worked with Herman Miller, Donnelly, Motorola, and Beth Israel Hospital all who were in the top 50 Best Places to Work while they were practicing Scanlon methods.

Frederick G. Lesieur carried on the Scanlon Conferences at MIT until the 1980s. He consulted and implemented Scanlon Plans widely.

== Participation and Committees ==
The philosophy of the plan is to promote group co-operation and solving of organizational problems. Cooperation and involvement start in the creation of the plan with a Design Team and continue once the Plan is implemented with Production and Screening Teams.

=== Participation and High Involvement Today ===
Today there are many different ways that Scanlon Systems involve employees in Organizational problem solving. At Donnelly the Donnelly Committee approved all changes in Personnel Policies and adjudicated issues of fairness and equity. They even recommended pay increases. Six Sigma and Lean Practices are often used in Scanlon Organizations as part of their improvement plans.

== Calculation of Scanlon Plan Bonus ==
Historically, the Scanlon plan bonus was calculated on the historical ratio of labor cost to sales value of production. Scanlon believed that it was very important that employees understand how the bonus is calculated and this method was easy for employees to understand. He felt that profit sharing as a way to create a bonus was fine as long as everyone understood "profits." He concluded that most don't understand how profits are calculated.

== See also ==
- Profit sharing
