= Enrolled actuary =

An enrolled actuary is an actuary enrolled by the Joint Board for the Enrollment of Actuaries under the Employee Retirement Income Security Act of 1974 (ERISA). Enrolled actuaries, under regulations of the Department of the Treasury and the Department of Labor, perform a variety of tasks with respect to pension plans in the United States under ERISA. As of August, 2024, there were approximately 3,400 enrolled actuaries.

== Qualifications ==
The Joint Board for the Enrollment of Actuaries administers two examinations to prospective enrolled actuaries. Once the two examinations have been passed, and an individual has also obtained sufficient relevant professional experience, that individual becomes an enrolled actuary.

The first exam (EA-1) tests basic knowledge of the mathematics of compound interest, the mathematics of life contingencies, and practical demographic analysis.

The second (EA-2) examination consists of two segments, which are offered during separate exam sittings in either the fall or the spring. Segment F covers the selection of actuarial assumptions, actuarial cost methods, and the calculation of minimum (required) and maximum (tax-deductible) contributions to pension plans. Segment L tests knowledge of relevant federal pension laws (in particular, the provisions of ERISA) as they affect pension actuarial practice.

== Employers ==
Enrolled actuaries generally work for human resource consulting firms, investment and insurance brokers, accounting firms, government organizations, and law firms. Some firms that employ enrolled actuaries combine two or more of these practice specialties.

== Organizations ==
Many enrolled actuaries belong to one or more of the following organizations: the Society of Actuaries, the American Academy of Actuaries, the Conference of Consulting Actuaries, or the American Society of Pension Professionals & Actuaries.
