= Kline–Miller Multiemployer Pension Reform Act of 2014 =

The Kline–Miller Multiemployer Pension Reform Act of 2014 (Division O of Pub. L. 113–235 (text) (PDF)) is a federal law that was enacted in the United States on December 16, 2014, with the goal of allowing certain American pension plans that have insufficient funds, and thus are at risk of insolvency, to reduce the benefits they owe to participants. The bill was co-sponsored by U.S. Representatives John Kline (R-Minnesota) and George Miller (D-California).

== Overview ==
According to the Pension Benefit Guaranty Corporation (PBGC), "In Kline–Miller, Congress established a new process for multiemployer pension plans to propose a temporary or permanent reduction of pension benefits if the plan is projected to run out of money."

According to the U.S. Treasury Department, "Kline–Miller requires the Treasury Department, in consultation with the Pension Benefit Guaranty Corporation (PBGC) and the Department of Labor, to review a multiemployer pension plan’s application to reduce benefits and determine whether it meets the requirements set by Congress."

Kline–Miller applies to multiemployer pension plans, which are set up through collective bargaining agreements involving labor unions and more than one unrelated employer, typically in a single industry. Under Kline–Miller, a multiemployer plan whose trustees determine that the plan is in "critical and declining status", which means that it is projected to run out of money in less than 15 years (20 years in some circumstances), may seek to reduce benefits to try to keep the plan solvent.

Within limits prescribed by Kline–Miller, the trustees—who include representatives of workers and management but rarely retiree representatives—design the benefit reduction proposal. The reductions may be permanent or temporary. The size of the reductions and how the reductions are spread among participants, is subject to the trustees' discretion within the law's limits. The benefits of retirees who are older than 80 on the reduction date and those receiving disability pensions may not be reduced. Retirees between the ages of 75 and 79 are subject to smaller reductions than younger retirees. Trustees are required to reduce the benefits of participants who worked for employers that went out of business or withdrew from the plan for other reasons before they reduce other participants' benefits. No participant's benefit may be reduced below 110% of the amount that PBGC guarantees. Trustees may choose to reduce retirees' benefits more than workers' benefits, they may choose not to reduce survivors' benefits, or they may reduce all eligible participants' benefits equally.

Before the trustees may cut any participant's benefit, the trustees must notify all participants about the benefit reduction proposal, including a benefit estimate that shows the participant's reduced benefit. The trustees must apply to the Treasury Department for approval of the reduction proposal, and they must demonstrate that the proposed reductions are sufficient to prevent future insolvency. Participants, including workers and retirees, vote on whether to accept the proposed reductions and a majority vote against the proposal would block it (although the Treasury Department, the Labor Department, and the PBGC can override their vote if they project that without the proposed reductions, PBGC will suffer future losses of $1 billion or more). If the Treasury Department and the participants approve the benefit reduction proposal, it takes effect. Retirees, survivors, and workers are not permitted to sue about their reduced benefits.

== Pension plans subject to Kline–Miller ==
As of February 2016, the trustees of more than 60 multiemployer pension plans covering a total of more than 900,000 participants had notified the Labor Department that the plans were in "critical and declining status". The largest was the Central States, Southeast and Southwest Areas Pension Fund of the International Brotherhood of Teamsters (the "Central States Pension Fund"), which had more than 400,000 participants and was projected to become insolvent in 2025.
