= Profit sharing =

Plan where employees share in profits

Profit sharing refers to various incentive plans introduced by businesses which provide direct or indirect payments to employees, often depending on the company's profitability, employees' regular salaries, and bonuses. In publicly traded companies, these plans typically amount to allocation of shares to employees.

The profit sharing plans are based on predetermined economic sharing rules that define the split of gains between the company as a principal and the employee as an agent. For example, suppose the profits are $x$, which might be a random variable. Before knowing the profits, the principal and agent might agree on a sharing rule $s(x)$. Here, the agent will receive $s(x)$ and the principal will receive the residual gain $x-s(x)$.

Profit-sharing tends to lead to less conflict and more cooperation between labor and their employers.

== History ==
American politician Albert Gallatin had profit-sharing institutions on his glass works in the 1790s. Another of early pioneers of profit sharing was English politician Theodore Taylor, who is known to have introduced the practice in his woollen mills during the late 1800s. In the United Kingdom, profit-sharing became prominent in the 1860s. In 1889, economist Nicholas Paine Gilman documented 135 cases of profit-sharing in the United States and Europe.

Economists debated profit-sharing in major economic journals in the 1880s. William Cooper Procter established a profit-sharing plan in Procter & Gamble in 1887.

Profit-sharing has historically been a prevalent practice in the Hollywood motion picture industry. Profit-sharing partnerships are also prevalent in industries such as law, accounting, medicine, investment banking, architecture, advertising, and consulting.

The Harvard economist Martin L. Weitzman was a prominent proponent of profit-sharing in the 1980s, influencing governments to incentivize the practice. Weitzman argued that profit-sharing could be a way to reduce unemployment without increasing inflation. Economists have debated the effects of profit-sharing on different outcomes.

=== France ===
Since 1967, French firms with more than 100 employees have been required to have profit-sharing with workers. Since 1990, this applies to all firms with more than 50 workers.

=== United States ===
In the United States, a profit sharing plan can be set up where all or some of the employee's profit sharing amount can be contributed to a retirement plan. These are often used in conjunction with 401(k) plans.

== Gainsharing ==
Gainsharing is a program that returns cost savings to the employees, usually as a lump-sum bonus. It is a productivity measure, as opposed to profit-sharing which is a profitability measure. There are three major types of gainsharing:

- Scanlon plan: This program dates back to the 1930s and relies on committees to create cost-sharing ideas. Designed to lower labor costs without lowering the level of a firm's activity. The incentives are derived as a function of the ratio between labor costs and sales value of production (SVOP).
- Rucker plan: This plan also uses committees, but although the committee structure is simpler the cost-saving calculations are more complex. A ratio is calculated that expresses the value of production required for each dollar of total wage bill.
- Improshare: Improshare stands for "Improved productivity through sharing" and is a more recent development. With this plan, a standard is developed that identifies the expected number of hours to produce something, and any savings between this standard and actual production are shared between the company and the workers.

== See also ==
- Co-determination
- Employee stock ownership
- Joint venture
- Mutualization
- Retirement plans in the United States
- Social dividend
