= Cash balance plan =

Type of retirement plan

A cash balance plan is a defined benefit retirement plan that maintains hypothetical individual employee accounts like a defined contribution plan. The hypothetical nature of the individual accounts was crucial in the early adoption of such plans because it enabled conversion of traditional plans without declaring a plan termination.

== Basics ==
The employees' accounts earn a fixed rate of return that can change over a period of time from year to year. Although it works much like a defined-contribution plan, it is actually a defined-benefit plan for legal purposes. In 2003, over 20% of US workers with defined benefit plans were in cash balance plans, according to Bureau of Labor Statistics data. Most of these plans resulted from conversions from traditional defined-benefit plans. The status of such plans was in legal limbo (see below), and the number of conversions slowed. However, legislation was recently passed that cleared the way for plan sponsors to adopt cash balance plans.

== Conversion controversy ==
Cash balance conversions have been controversial and have raised the ire of workers and their advocates. In 2005 the Government Accountability Office (GAO) released a report analyzing the effects of cash balance conversions on worker benefits. They found that in a typical conversion the cash balance plan would provide lower benefits for most workers than if the defined-benefit plan had remained unchanged and the worker had stayed in their job until retirement age. This decline in benefits tends to be largest for older workers. This is because in a traditional plan, where benefits are based on final average pay, the "value" of the benefits accrues much faster for older workers than for younger workers. In contrast, in a DC or cash balance plan, contributions are made at the same rate (by workers in the DC plans and by the employer in the cash balance plan), and a dollar contributed to a younger worker's account is actually more valuable because it has more time to compound before retirement. Thus some argue that cash balance plans hurt older workers.

On the other hand, this may not be the relevant comparison. If the alternative to cash balance conversion is that the plan is frozen or terminated (with the vested balance going to the worker), all workers would be much worse off than in a cash balance conversion. This is a realistic possibility; tens of thousands of defined benefit plans have been frozen and/or terminated in the last two decades, far more than have been converted to cash balance plans. Likewise, for the many employees who leave their job before retirement (whether voluntarily or not), many would be better off under the cash balance conversion than under the original defined-benefit plan. In addition, about half of cash balance conversions have grandfathered in some or all of the existing participants in the defined-benefit plan.

== Types of pensions ==
The 401(k) plan is an example of a defined contribution plan because the Internal Revenue Code §414(i) states [t]hat the term defined-contribution plan means any plan that provides retirement benefits to a worker based solely on the amount contributed to the (worker's individual) account and any (investment) income, gains net of any expenses and losses.

Under the definition of accrued benefit under Code §411(a)(7)(A)(ii) in the case of a plan that is not a defined benefit plan, [the term accrued benefit] means the balance [in] the employee's [individual] account. On the other hand, for defined-benefit plans, Section §411(a)(7)(A)(i) states that "accrued benefit" means "the employee’s [] annual benefit" as it is "determined under the plan … expressed in the form of an … [annuity] … commencing at normal retirement age." Finally, the Code's definition for defined benefit plans are all plans that are not defined contribution plans.

Cash balance plans are defined-benefit plans that look like defined-contribution plans. A worker's right to a pension in a defined-benefit plan represents a contingent liability, and hence an uncertain financial obligation to the employer sponsoring the plan. Section 412 of the Code requires the employer to make annual contributions to the plan to ensure that the plan assets will be sufficient to pay the promised benefits later at retirement. As part of this process the plan is required to have an actuary perform annual "actuarial valuations" in which the present value of each worker's "accrued benefit" is estimated and then each present value for each worker covered by the plan is added up so that the minimum annual contribution can be determined.

The "actuarial present values" for the "accrued benefit" for each worker is the lump sum dollar amount that represents the financial value of the employer's liability on the date of the valuation. It does not include the future accrual of pension benefits nor does it include the effect of projected future salary increases. Thus the lump sum value for each worker is not based on that worker's projected final salary at retirement, but only the worker's salary on the date of valuation.

== Design of plans ==
Some cash balance plans communicate to workers that these "actuarial present values" are "hypothetical accounts" because upon termination of service, the employer will give the former worker the option to take "all his money" from the pension plan out. In reality, if both the worker and employer agree, even in a normal defined-benefit plan, a former worker may take away "all his money" from the pension plan. There are no legal differences in this "portability" aspect between a traditional defined-benefit plan and a cash balance plan.

A typical "design" for a cash balance plan would provide each worker a "hypothetical account" and pay credits in the current year of, say, 5% of current salary. In addition, the cash balance plan would provide an interest credit of, say, 6% of the prior year's balance in each worker's "hypothetical account" so that the current year's balance would be the sum of the prior year's balance and the current year's pay credit and an interest credit on the prior year's balance. For a worker who starts at age 25 with a $2000 a month starting salary, he would start with a zero account balance and the first year's pay credit would be $1200 leaving him with an end of first year balance of $1200 in his "hypothetical" account. Because his beginning of first year balance was zero, his interest credit for the first year is also zero. In his second year, with a 3.5% salary increase his monthly salary would be $2070 on his 26th birthday. The 5% pay credit for this second year would be $1242. Because his second year "hypothetical account" starts the year with a $1200 balance, the interest credit at 6% would be $72. Adding the beginning balance of $1200 to the $1242 pay credit and $72 interest credit would give an ending balance in the "hypothetical" account of $2514 ($2514 = $1200 + $1242 + $72) for the second year. Repeat this process for each ensuing year until termination. This creates a hypothetical account balance from which the legally required benefit -- an annuity payable for the life of the participant or beneficiary who elects to commence payment at normal retirement age—can be calculated. This is due to the requirement that benefits be definitely determinable found in the IRS Regulations Section 1.401.

== Lump sum calculation cases ==
In 1993, the Third Circuit decided in Goldman v. First National Bank of Boston that the terminated worker did not demonstrate that the adoption of the cash balance plan violated age discrimination rules. In 2000, the Eleventh Circuit in Lyons v. Georgia Pacific and the Second Circuit in Esden v. Bank of Boston decided that the employer violated rules for calculating lump sums, and a district court in Eaton vs. Onan Corp. decided that adopting the cash balance plan did not violate age discrimination rules. In early 2003, the First Circuit in Campbell v. BankBoston did not decide that the employer violated the age discrimination rules against a former worker because the former worker made a procedural error and brought the issue up late.

Then in summer of 2003, the Seventh Circuit in Berger v. Xerox Corp. Retirement Plan, decided that the lump sum calculation for workers terminating service prior to retirement who were covered by the defendant cash balance pension plan cannot violate the rules for defined-benefit plans, and in a district court in Illinois in Cooper vs. IBM Personal Pension Plan, decided that the very design of the cash balance plan – the issue that the Campbell court only reached in dicta – had indeed violated the age discrimination rules because the "rate of benefit accruals" did "decrease" on account the "attainment of any age."

The Lump Sum cases all held that because cash balance plans were defined-benefit plans, they had to abide by the rules for defined benefit plans when the employer calculates the lump sum actuarial present value by first accruing the account balance to normal retirement age and then converting the account balance at retirement age into a life annuity before then discounting back to the current date at a statutorily required discount rate. Because these cash balance plans were designed to "look like" defined-contribution plans, the defendants asserted that these cash balance pension plans were not true defined-benefit plans but were "hybrid" plans instead. Therefore, because they were "hybrids" and looked like defined-contribution plans and because workers are only entitled to the actual balance in defined-contribution plans, the plaintiffs should get lump sums equal only to their "hypothetical" account balances. In Berger v. Xerox, Judge Richard Posner noted in the case – "for hybrid read unlawful" – that the lump sum amounts should have been larger. So the cash balance plan is not an exotic "hybrid" plan in the eyes of the law but remained in the defined-benefit part of the pension taxonomy.

This process of taking the account balance forward from the terminated worker's current age up to the worker's normal retirement age, before discounting back to the current age is sometimes called the "whipsaw." If the interest rate used for discounting back is lower than the rate used for interest credits on the hypothetical account balances, then the legally required lump sum values would be higher than the worker's account balance in his hypothetical account.

== Age discrimination cases ==
Proponents of cash balance plans advocate that these plans do not violate the age discrimination statutes applicable to defined benefit-pension plans. The statutes forbid – in virtually the same words – any plan from reducing "the rate of benefit accrual" for any worker on account "of the attainment of any age". Although the Code defines the "accrued benefit" for any worker covered by defined-benefit plans as "expressed in the form of an annual benefit commencing at normal retirement age" and defines "normal retirement benefit" as the "greater of the early retirement benefit under the plan, or the benefit under the plan commencing at normal retirement age", the supporters of such cash balance plans still argue that the terms "accrued benefit" and "rate of benefit accrual" are ambiguous or undefined.

In Onan Corp., District Court Judge Hamilton agreed with the supporters of cash balance plans and held that the cash balance plan design did not violate age discrimination because the terms "rate of benefit accrual" and "accrued benefit" were not defined in the relevant statutes. But the terms "accrued benefit" and "rate of benefit accrual" have long been very familiar and unambiguous to pension actuaries. It was because the terms were so unambiguous to actuaries that they could construct the initial balances in each worker's "hypothetical" account for these new cash balance pension plans. Also, §411(a)(1)(7) of the Code defines "accrued benefit". Thus pension actuaries are very familiar with changes in accrual rate factors used in a traditional defined-benefit pension plan's formula.

In Kathi Cooper v. IBM Personal Pension Plan, District Court Judge Murphy in 2003 came to the opposite conclusion because the terms accrued benefit and rate of benefit accrual were not ambiguous. According to Murphy benefits accrued at a decreasing rate solely based on increases in age, the plan design of the cash balance plan violated the age discrimination statutes. If this rule is upheld, then all "flat rate pay credit" design cash balance plans would violate age discrimination. A plan sponsor could avoid these problems by setting up a cash balance plan with steadily increasing – or age-graded – rates for pay credits. This has the same economic effect as adopting a "career average salary" traditional defined-benefit plan. The ruling was reversed on appeal in 2006.

== Legislative developments ==
Because of the troublesome age discrimination suits and misunderstanding and frustration by older workers covered by such plans, Congress, notably Senator Charles Grassley (R) of Iowa, has a proposal to statutorily fix the problem. It involves outlawing "wearaway".

The Pension Protection Act of 2006 was signed into law in August 2006 and prospectively made the flat salary credit type plans immune from age discrimination. Also, the use of a higher interest rate for calculation of lump sums is now allowed as the new law eliminates the whipsaw. The law fixes age discrimination only prospectively.

== See also ==
- Pension
- PBGC
- ERISA
- Defined benefit pension plan
