= Central Government Employees Welfare Housing Organisation =

Indian government agency

Agency overview
- Formed: 1995
- Jurisdiction: Republic of India
- Headquarters: Sixth Floor, 'A' Wing, Janpath Bhavan, Janpath, New Delhi-110 001
- Minister responsible: Manohar Lal kattar, Housing and Urban Poverty Alleviation
- Agency executive: Gagan Gupta, chief executive officer
- Parent department: Ministry of Housing and Urban Poverty Alleviation
- Website: Official website

Central Government Employees Welfare Housing Organisation (CGEWHO) is an Indian autonomous body under the Ministry of Housing and Urban Affairs established in 1995. The organisation was established to construct and manage affordable housing for serving and retired federal employees of the Union Government of India. Since 1995 the organisation has constructed two houses every day.

== See also ==
- Union government employees in India
