= Union government employees in India =

Government employees in the India are the employees working with the Union Government of India. There are around 56 ministries and departments in Government of India employing around four million eight hundred sixty-seven thousand employees.

== Statistics ==
Government employees in the union government in 56 ministries and departments under latter as of 1 July 2023 has 48.67 lakhs working employees and about 77 lakhs retired employees on rolls. Indian Railways with 1.3 million employees has highest number of employees in union government.

== Benefits ==
Government employees in the India are entitled to following benefits:

- Pension
- Leave encashment
- Gratuity on Death
- Medical facilities under Union Government Health Scheme

Single male employees and female employees in the Union government are eligible for child care leave for 730 days.

== Salary structure ==
Union government employees lowest and highest salary structure was revised in 7th Pay Commission.

== Training programmes ==
Government employees in India are provided with following training programmes

- My iGot
- Blended Programmes
- Curated Programmes

== Vacancies ==
Union government had 9.64 lakh vacancies in various departments as on 1 July 2023. As of 2025, reports indicate that vacancies remain close to 10 lakh posts.

== See also ==
- Pay Commission
- Central Government Employees Welfare Housing Organisation
