= Buck (human resources consulting company) =

US human resource consulting firm

- Formerly: Buck Consultants; Buck Consultants at Xerox; Conduent HR Services; Mellon HR&IS
- Industry: Professional services
- Founded: 1916; 110 years ago
- Founder: George B. Buck Sr.
- Headquarters: New York City, United States
- Area served: Worldwide
- Products: Human resource consulting and outsourcing
- Owner: Independent (1916–97); Mellon Financial (1997–2005); ACS (2005-10); Xerox (2010-17); Conduent (2017–18); H.I.G. Capital (2018–23); Arthur J. Gallagher & Co. (2023–present)
- Number of employees: 2,300
- Website: Official website

Buck (formerly Buck Consultants) is a global HR benefits and human resource consulting firm based in New York City. On April 3, 2023, the company was acquired by Arthur J. Gallagher & Co.

== History ==
Founded as an actuarial firm in New York City in 1916 by George B. Buck Sr., in 2016 the firm had more than 1,500 employees and affiliates in nearly 200 global locations.

Buck Consultants remained an independent organization until 1997 when it was acquired by Mellon Financial. The Buck Consultants brand name was scrapped in late 2003 when Mellon unified various business lines under the name Mellon Human Resource & Investor Solutions (Mellon HR&IS).

Affiliated Computer Services (ACS) acquired Mellon's human resource businesses in 2005 and reintroduced the Buck Consultants brand. In 2010, Xerox acquired ACS for $6.4 billion. Buck Consultants was later rebranded as "Buck Consultants at Xerox".

At the beginning of 2017, Conduent was spun off from Xerox. Buck Consultants, which was one of the businesses spun off, was renamed Conduent HR Services.

In May 2018, Conduent announced that it would sell the Buck Consultants portion of its business to H.I.G. Capital, starting the clock on a 90-day transition period in which it hoped to complete the sale. Immediately after the close of the deal on August 13, the business became known as Buck.

Arthur J. Gallagher & Co. completed the acquisition of Buck in April 2023.
