= Pension Protection Act of 2006 =

Protection Act of USA

- Long title: An Act To provide economic security for all Americans, and for other purposes.
- Acronyms (colloquial): PPA
- Enacted by: the 109th United States Congress
- Effective: August 17, 2006

Citations
- Public law: Pub. L. 109–280 (text) (PDF)
- Statutes at Large: 120 Stat. 780

Codification
- Acts amended: ERISA, Internal Revenue Code of 1986

Legislative history
- Introduced in the House of Representatives as H.R. 4 by John Boehner (R‑OH) on July 28, 2006; Passed the House of Representatives on July 28, 2006 (279–131); Passed the Senate on August 3, 2006 (93–5); Signed into law by President George W. Bush on August 17, 2006

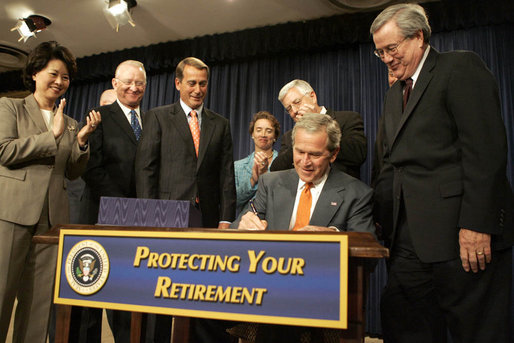
President George W. Bush signs into law the Pension Protection Act of 2006

The Pension Protection Act of 2006 (Pub. L. 109–280 (text) (PDF)), 120 Stat. 780, was signed into law by U.S. President George W. Bush on August 17, 2006.

== Pension reform ==
This legislation requires companies who have underfunded their pension plans to pay higher premiums to the Pension Benefit Guaranty Corporation (PBGC) and extends the requirement of providing extra funding to the pension systems of companies that terminate their pension plans. It also requires companies to analyze their pension plans' obligations more accurately, closes loopholes that previously allowed some companies to underfund their plans by skipping payments, and raises the cap on the amount employers are allowed to invest in their own plans. This will allow employers to deduct more money using the pension tax shield in times of high profits.

It requires actuaries to use the equivalent of the projected accrued benefit cost method for determining annual normal cost.

Other elements:

- Provides statutory authority for employers to enroll workers in defined contribution plans automatically; formerly, the authority came from DOL rulemaking
- Expands disclosure that workers have about the performance of their pensions
- Removes the conflict of interest fiduciary liability from giving self-interested investment advice for retirement accounts
- Gives workers greater control over how their accounts are invested
- Extends the 2001 tax act's contribution limits for IRAs and 401(k)s.
- Allows automatic contributions to be returned to employees without tax penalties, if employee opts out within 90 days
- Established safe harbor investments, also known as Qualified Default Investment Alternatives, to protect employers from liability of losses suffered by automatically enrolled employees

== Charitable organization reform ==
The Pension Protection Act also reformed several types of tax-exempt charitable organizations including donor-advised funds, private foundations, and supporting organizations.

=== Supporting organizations ===
The Pension Protection Act cracks down on supporting organizations, particularly Type III supporting organizations. The Act applies further regulations and penalties that takes away several of the privileges that supporting organizations have over private foundations, such as applying private foundation law of excess benefit transactions, excess business holding rules, and pay out requirements.

== Tax savings ==
=== Public Safety Officers ===
One tax benefit allowed under the pension protection act is that qualified retired "Public Safety Officers" may exclude from income the cost of health insurance. The exclusion is shown on the tax return as simply subtracting the exclusion from the figure shown on the 1099-R form, and placing the smaller figure on the pension income line on the 1040. The text literal "PSO" must be written on the dotted line to the left of the figure. IRS Pub 575 has more details.

Public safety officers include police, firefighters, emergency medical technicians, and many types of federal and state employees dealing with criminals.

=== Early withdrawal penalty exceptions ===
The PPA tells the Secretary of Treasury to provide further exceptions to the 10% penalty on withdrawing from a retirement account before reaching proper retirement age. In particular, some penalty exceptions are narrowly defined to only covering IRA accounts, excluding 401(k) and other plans.

=== Inherited IRAs ===
The PPA provides a new mechanism for an IRA to be passed on to a non-spouse beneficiary. Transferring an IRA account this way can allow better control over when to withdraw (and pay taxes on) the IRA funds. An IRA account can only be passed on once, and it is not directly transferred into the beneficiary's account. Instead, a special IRA account with the heading " Deceased Name For the Benefit of Beneficiary Name " is made to keep the transfer.

== Pension Benefit Guaranty Corporation ==
The Pension Benefit Guaranty Corporation (PBGC) is a federal corporation created under the Employee Retirement Income Security Act of 1974. It currently guarantees payment of basic pension benefits earned by 44 million American workers and retirees participating in over 29,000 private-sector defined benefit pension plans. The agency receives no funds from general tax revenues. Operations are financed largely by insurance premiums paid by companies that sponsor pension plans and by investment returns.

The 1985 case National Foundation, Inc. (now Waterstone) v. United States, was instrumental in defining the standards used for Donor Advised Funds. Some of the standards that were included in the 2006 act include:

- Legal definition of a donor-advised fund.
- A list of prohibited payments to donors and advisers to donor-advised fund.
- New rules about what grants can be made from donor-advised funds.
- The documentation required for all contributions to donor-advised funds.

== Amendments ==
On December 23, 2008, P.L. 110-458 (H.R. 7327), the Worker, Retiree, and Employer Recovery Act of 2008, was signed into law by the President. The Act makes technical corrections related to the PPA of 2006.

The Cooperative and Small Employer Charity Pension Flexibility Act (S. 1302; 113th Congress) is a proposed amendment that would make permanent an existing exemption from the Pension Protection Act of 2006 for a few small groups. Approximately 33 different plans would be affected. The bill's sponsors, such as Senator Pat Roberts, indicated that the exemption from the Pension Protection Act (PPA) that would be granted under this bill was needed because "the PPA was meant to protect employee pensions, but in the case of rural cooperatives and charities, it jeopardizes plans for employees." Senator Harkin criticized the PPA for forcing charity organizations to divert funds away from the services they provide. S. 1302 passed the Senate on January 28, 2014.

== See also ==
- Pensions Act 2008, UK law concerning automatic enrolment
- Pensions in the United States
