= Profit-sharing pension plan =

A profit-sharing agreement for pensions, typically in the United States, is an agreement that establishes a pension plan maintained by the employer to share a portion of its profits with its employees.

== History ==
A profit-sharing agreement used to be supplemental to a type of pension called a defined contribution plan. For example, if an employee should become ill or incur economic hardship, then access to some or all of profit sharing account would prevent the employee from quitting.

Today, most newer companies only have profit-sharing plans and don't have a defined benefits plan. The simplest and most common profit sharing implementation is for the employer to contribute a flat dollar amount that is allocated based on a percentage of the employees' annual compensation. Total annual contributions limits are based on how much the employee defers, plus how much the employer contributes. Currently, the total amount contributed to the plan cannot exceed the lesser of:

- 100 percent of the participant's compensation; or
- $53,000 for 2016 (for those 50 or over, an additional $6,000 is allowed as a catch-up contribution)

== Requirements ==
The Treasury regulations to the Internal Revenue Code sets out the requirements for a profit-sharing agreement. The agreement must use a predetermined formula for allocating and distributing the profits. Then the agreement must set out whether allocations may begin after a fixed number of years, attainment of certain age or prior occurrence of some event.

The agreement must be tied to the basic compensation of the employee by allocating a profit sharing amount to the employee's account based on the proportion of the employee's salary to the total salary of the participants.

An employer does not need to earn profits to have a profit-sharing agreement. Contributions under the agreement need not be based on profits but rather salary and a phantom profit amount. This phantom profit originates from a predetermined formula for allocations under the profit-sharing agreement.

== See also ==
- Profit sharing
- Retirement plans in the United States
