= Defined contribution plan =

Type of retirement plan

A defined contribution (DC) plan is a type of retirement plan in which the employer, employee or both make contributions on a regular basis. Individual accounts are set up for participants and benefits are based on the amounts credited to these accounts (through employee contributions and, if applicable, employer contributions) plus any investment earnings on the money in the account. In defined contribution plans, future benefits fluctuate on the basis of investment earnings. The most common type of defined contribution plan is a savings and thrift plan. Under this type of plan, the employee contributes a predetermined portion of their earnings (usually pretax) to an individual account, all or part of which is matched by the employer.

In the United States, 26 U.S.C. § 414(i) specifies a defined contribution plan as a "plan which provides for an individual account for each participant and for benefits based solely on the amount contributed to the participant's account, and any income, expenses, gains and losses, and any forfeitures of accounts of other participants which may be allocated to such participant's account".

== Overview ==
In a defined contribution plan, contributions are paid into an individual account by employers and employees. The contributions are then invested, for example in the stock market, and the returns on the investment (which may be positive or negative) are credited to the individual's account. On retirement, the member's account is used to provide retirement benefits, sometimes through the purchase of an annuity which then provides a regular income. Defined contribution plans have become widespread all over the world in recent years and are now the dominant form of plan in the private sector in many countries.

For example, the number of defined contribution plans in the US has been steadily increasing, as more and more employers see pension contributions as a large expense avoidable by disbanding the defined benefit plan and instead offering a defined contribution plan.

Money contributed can either be from employee salary deferral or from employer contributions. The portability of defined contribution plans is legally no different from the portability of defined benefit plans. However, because of the cost of administration and ease of determining the plan sponsor's liability for defined contribution plans (no actuary is needed to calculate the lump sum equivalent unlike for defined benefit plans), in practice, defined contribution plans have become generally portable.

In a defined contribution plan, investment risk and investment rewards are assumed by each individual/employee/retiree and not by the sponsor/employer. This risk could be substantial. Based on simulations from security returns over the twentieth century across 16 countries, there is considerable variation in retirement plan fund ratios across both time and country. Those countries keenest on individual DC accounts have the highest retirement plan fund ratios but all investors in all countries face considerable downside risk.

Some countries such as France, Italy and Spain face a ten percent probability of having a real replacement ratio of 0.25, 0.20 and 0.17 respectively. In addition, DC scheme participants do not necessarily purchase annuities with their savings upon retirement and bear the risk of outliving their assets.

The "cost" of a defined contribution plan is readily calculated, but the benefit from a defined contribution plan depends upon the account balance at the time an employee is looking to use the assets. So, for this arrangement, the contribution is known but the benefit is unknown (until calculated).

Despite the fact that the participant in a defined contribution plan typically has control over investment decisions, the plan sponsor retains a significant degree of fiduciary responsibility over investment of plan assets, including the selection of investment options and administrative providers.

== By country ==
Defined contribution plans are common in the United States, and exist in various other countries, including: the UK's personal retirement plans and proposed National Employment Savings Trust (NEST), Germany's Riester plans, Australia's Superannuation system, and New Zealand's KiwiSaver scheme. Individual retirement savings plans also exist in Austria, Czech Republic, Denmark, Georgia, Greece, Finland, Ireland, Japan, Korea, Netherlands, Slovenia and Spain.

=== United States ===
In the United States, the legal definition of a defined contribution plan is a plan providing for an individual account for each participant, and for benefits based solely on the amount contributed to the account, plus or minus income, gains, expenses and losses allocated to the account (see 26 U.S.C. § 414(i)). Examples of defined contribution plans in the US include 401(k) plans and Profit-sharing pension plans. The Thrift Savings Plan, open to all Federal employees and uniformed service members, is among the largest such plans.

In such plans, the employee is often responsible for selecting the types of investments toward which the funds in the retirement plan are allocated. This may range from choosing one of a small number of pre-determined mutual funds to selecting individual stocks or other securities. Most defined contribution plans are characterized by certain tax advantages, and some provide for a portion of the employee's contributions to be matched by the employer, either automatically (in the case of safe harbor contributions) or at the employer's discretion. In exchange, the funds in such plans may not be withdrawn by the employee prior to reaching a certain age – typically the year the employee reaches 59.5 years old (with a small number of exceptions, such as retirement before that age) – without incurring a substantial penalty in addition to taxes.

Congress has limited the amount that may be contributed annually to defined contribution plans. For 2025, the limit on annual additions to a defined contribution plan under section 415(c) was $70,000 or 100 percent of compensation, whichever was less. Annual additions include employer contributions, employee contributions, and forfeitures allocated to a participant's account. The separate annual contribution limit for an individual's contributions to traditional and Roth IRAs was $7,000. The separate employee elective-deferral limit for 401(k), 403(b), governmental 457 plans, and the Thrift Savings Plan was $23,500. The generally applicable catch-up limit for participants aged 50 or older was $7,500, while participants who attained age 60 through 63 during 2025 had a higher catch-up limit of $11,250. The amounts are indexed to compensate for the effects of inflation but increase only in multiples of $500, which means that in some years the amounts do not increase.

=== United Kingdom ===
In the UK the shift from defined benefit to defined contribution retirement plans has elevated significantly, to the point where many large DB plans are no longer open to new employees. This momentum has been employer-driven and is considered a response to a combination of factors such as pension underfunding, declined long-term interest rates and the move to more market-based accounting. The focus is now on managing pension fund assets in relation to liabilities instead of market benchmarks. The Pensions Policy Institute estimates that in 2013 there were approximately 8 million private sector workers building up DC benefits, compared to approximately 1 million building up DB benefits. However, one point of concern with these schemes is that employers often contribute less than what they would under final salary plans. According to the National Association of Pension Funds (NAPF), employers contribute on average 11% of salary into final salary schemes, compared to only 6% to money purchase. This indicates that individuals will have to save more of their own income into a retirement fund in order to accomplish a satisfactory retirement income. Companies such as Aon Hewitt, Mercer and Aviva recognise these challenges and have identified the need to help new generations of workers with their retirement funding plans.

Budget 2014: All tax restrictions on retired people's access to their registered retirement pots are removed, ending the requirement to buy an annuity. The taxable part of the registered retirement pot is taken as cash on retirement to be charged at normal income tax rate(s). The increase in total registered retirement savings that people can take as a lump sum to £30,000.

=== Germany ===
Defined contribution plans were introduced in Germany as part of the "Law Strengthening Occupational Pensions" (Betriebsrentenstärkungsgesetz) in July 2017. Prior to the reform, defined contribution plans were illegal and any plan could ultimately trigger a liability for the employer if the plan went into default. These plans can be implemented only by collective bargaining agreements.

=== Japan ===
Defined contribution schemes have existed in Japan since October 2001, and as of March 2012 cover more than 4 million workers at about 16,400 companies.

=== Singapore ===
The Central Provident Fund (CPF) is Singapore's national pension fund. It is a defined contribution plan, contributed by employers and employees. With over 3 million members, it ranks among the world's largest defined contribution (DC) schemes. The CPF Board, a statutory authority established by legislation, runs this national pension fund.

=== India ===
Central Government employees in India who joined after January 1, 2004 participate in National Pension Scheme which is defined contribution plan run by Pension Fund Regulatory Authority of India. Earlier employees were under Defined Benefit Plan.

All Government and Private sector organizations had to offer Provident Fund (PF) which is a type of Defined Contribution Plan. The NPS which was started in 2004 is a recent option given to all Central Government employees. The 10% of contribution made by the employer and employees are mandated by the regulations. Additionally employees are given the ability to opt for an additional contribution if they so desire. All contributions are managed by the PF authority. PF authority choose the investment vehicle, however the beneficiaries are given a standard % of returns on their contribution. Some large private sector organizations have also formed their Trust to manage the contributions received from its employees.

== See also ==
- Bureau of Labor Statistics
- Thrift Savings Plan, the defined contribution plan for United States Government employees and military members, purportedly the largest such plan in the world
- Pension
- Cash balance plan
- Notional defined contribution
- Retirement
- Individual retirement account
- 401(k) plans
- Collective trust fund
