= Professional in Human Resources =

Certifications for human resource professionals

Professional in Human Resources (PHR) is a certification in the human resource management profession. The certification, awarded by the Human Resource Certification Institute (HRCI), signifies that individuals possess the theoretical knowledge and practical experience in human resource management necessary to pass an examination demonstrating a mastery of the body of knowledge in the field. The Senior Professional in Human Resources (SPHR) is the senior-most human resources certification for those who have also demonstrated a strategic mastery of the HR body of knowledge.

== Exam ==
The exams are administered at computer-based testing centers throughout the world. Online testing is also available. The exams are offered at all times throughout the year.

The exam is both knowledge- and experience-based. Candidates are given three hours to answer 175 multiple-choice questions. The test specifications are based on the PHR/SPHR Body of Knowledge, which is composed of five functional areas.

== aPHR certification ==
In 2016, the HRCI announced the Associate Professional in Human Resources (aPHR) certification. The aPHR is a knowledge certification designed for professionals early in their HR career or non-HR professionals. Unlike other HR certifications, it does not require any professional HR experience and simply assesses candidates on their knowledge in five functional areas with the following weights:

1. Talent Acquisition (19%)
2. Learning and Development (15%)
3. Compensation and Benefits (17%)
4. Employee Relations (24%)
5. Compliance and Risk Management (25%)

== Preparation ==
The HR Certification Institute does not endorse any one way to prepare or study for the PHR exam. There are several organizations that offer study materials and prep courses to assist individuals in their study efforts.

The HR Certification Institute (HRCI) website offers a directory of these providers (www.hrci.org). With the introduction of the SHRM-CP and SHRM-SCP certifications (competitors to PHR and SPHR), the number of physical/in-class providers has dropped significantly, particularly those who are channel partners of SHRM (Society for Human Resource Management). Online providers of PHR and SPHR exam prep courses have become popular due to their accessibility.

== Recertification ==
Recertification for the PHR or SPHR can be done by re-taking the exam every three years, or by earning 60 recertification credits inside of their 3-year cycle. The HRCI will accept these credits from a variety of different resources, including work experience, conference/seminar attendance, and eLearning (webinar-based).

An HRCI Webcast credit is earned from watching a webcast only (no quiz or test required). These credits can account for no more than 20, out of the required 60 recertification credits one would need.

HRCI eLearning credits, on the other hand, are typically a webcast plus a quiz/test. The combination of the two provides the participant with an HRCI eLearning Credit, which can be used in an unlimited amount towards recertification; all 60 credits if one chooses.

Webcast Credit = Webcast/Video Only (no more than 20 can be used)

eLearning Credit = Webcast + Quiz (unlimited use towards recertification)

Recertification for the SHRM-CP or SHRM-SCP credential must: Earn 60 credits (PDCs) within a 3-year recertification period that ends on the last day of the credential holder's birth month. Retake the certification exam at the end of the 3-year recertification period.

== See also ==
- Professional certification – Designation earned by a person to assure qualification to perform a job or task
