= Defined benefit pension plan =

Type of pension plan

A defined benefit (DB) pension plan is a type of pension plan in which an employer/sponsor promises a specified pension payment, lump-sum, or combination thereof on retirement that depends on an employee's earnings history, tenure of service and age, rather than depending directly on individual investment returns. Traditionally, many governmental and public entities, as well as a large number of corporations, provide defined benefit plans, sometimes as a means of compensating workers in lieu of increased pay.

A defined benefit plan is 'defined' in the sense that the benefit formula is defined and known in advance. Conversely, for a "defined contribution retirement saving plan," the formula for computing the employer's and employee's contributions is defined and known in advance, but the benefit to be paid out is not known in advance.

In the United States, 26 U.S.C. § 414(j) specifies a defined benefit plan to be any pension plan that is not a defined contribution plan, where a defined contribution plan is any plan with individual accounts. A traditional pension plan that defines a benefit for an employee upon that employee's retirement is a defined benefit plan.

The most common type of formula used is based on the employee's terminal earnings (final salary). Under this formula, benefits are based on a percentage of average earnings during a specified number of years at the end of a worker's career.

In the private sector, defined benefit plans are often funded exclusively by employer contributions. In the public sector, defined benefit plans usually require employee contributions.

Over time, these plans may face deficits or surpluses between the money currently in the plans and the total amount of their pension obligations. Contributions may be made by the employee, the employer, or both. In many defined benefit plans, the employer bears the investment risk and can benefit from surpluses.

== Overview ==
When participating in a defined benefit pension plan, an employer/sponsor promises to pay the employees/members a specific benefit for life beginning at retirement. The benefit is calculated in advance using a formula based on age, earnings, and years of service.

The liability of the pension lies with the employer/sponsor who is responsible for making the decisions. Employer and/or employer/employee contributions to a defined benefit pension plan are based on a formula that calculates the contributions needed to meet the defined benefit. These contributions are actuarially determined taking into consideration the employee's life expectancy and normal retirement age, possible changes to interest rates, annual retirement benefit amount, and the potential for employee turnover.

Each jurisdiction would have legislation which has requirements and limitations for administering pension plans. Entitlements and limitations may also be based or established in common law. Employees are always entitled to the vested accrued benefit earned to date. If an employee leaves the company before retirement, the benefits earned so far are frozen and held in a trust for the employee until retirement age or in some instances the employee is able to take away a lump sum value or transfer the value to another pension plan.

Defined benefit plans distribute their benefits through life annuities. In a life annuity, employees receive equal periodic benefit payments (monthly, quarterly, etc.) for the rest of their lives. A defined benefit pension plan allows joint distributions so a surviving spouse can still receive 50 percent of your payment.

=== United States ===
In the United States, the maximum retirement benefit permitted in 2014 under a defined benefit plan is $210,000 (up from $205,000 in 2013). Defined benefit pension plans in the U.S. currently do not have contribution limits.

A defined benefit pension plan must allow its vested employees to receive their benefits no later than the 60th day after the end of the plan year in which they have been employed for ten years or leave their employer. Employees who reach age 65 or the specified retirement age in their plan can also collect the benefits. Starting in 2002, the maximum benefit is now reduced for retirement prior to age 62, and increased for retirement after age 65.

A defined benefit plan cannot force you to receive your benefits before normal retirement age. However, if the lump sum value of your benefit is less than $5,000, and you are vested, then the plan may simply pay your benefit as a lump sum soon after termination. The plan document has to allow for the automatic lump sum payment. However, you must begin to receive your benefits no later than April 1 of the calendar year next following the last year of employment or calendar year you reach age 70 1/2, whichever is later.

As of March 2026, 86% of state and local government workers had access to a defined benefit plan and 75% participated. In the private sector, access stood at 14% and participation at 9%. Among all civilian workers, access to defined benefit plans was 24%.

Federal public sector plans are governed by the Internal Revenue Code and Federal law, while state and local public sector plans are governed by the Internal Revenue Code and state law. Thus the funding requirements, benefits, plan solvency, and participant rights and obligations vary significantly. Private sector plans are governed by the Employee Retirement Income Security Act of 1974 (ERISA). This law contains provisions rooted in the Internal Revenue Code and enforced by the Internal Revenue Service, but, in Title I of ERISA, also provides a body of Federal law governing employee benefit plans that preempts state law. Rooted in the principles of trust law, Title I of ERISA governs the fiduciary conduct and reporting requirements of private sector employee benefits plans through a system of exclusively Federal rights and remedies. Title I is administered by the Employee Benefits Security Administration (EBSA) at the United States Department of Labor. EBSA is led by the Assistant Secretary of Labor for Employee Benefits, a Sub-Cabinet-level position requiring nomination by the President of the United States and confirmation by the United States Senate.

== Benefit plan ==
Traditionally, retirement plans have been administered by institutions which exist specifically for that purpose, by large businesses, or, for government workers, by the government itself. A traditional form of a defined benefit plan is the final salary plan, under which the pension paid is equal to the number of years worked, multiplied by the member's salary at retirement, multiplied by a factor known as the accrual rate. The final accrued amount is available as a monthly pension or a lump sum.

The benefit in a defined benefit pension plan is determined by a formula that can incorporate the employee's pay, years of employment, age at retirement, and other factors. A simple example is a dollars times service plan design that provides a certain amount per month based on the time an employee works for a company. For example, a plan offering $100 a month per year of service would provide $3,000 per month to a retiree with 30 years of service. While this type of plan is popular among unionized workers, final average pay (FAP) remains the most common type of defined-benefit plan offered in the United States. In FAP plans, the average salary over the final years of an employee's career determines the benefit amount.

Frequently, as in Canadian government employees' pensions, the average salary uses current dollars. This results in inflation in the averaging years decreasing the cost and purchasing power of the pension. This can be avoided by converting salaries to dollars of the first year of retirement and then averaging. If that is done, then inflation has no direct effect on the purchasing power and cost of the pension at the outset.

In the United Kingdom, benefits are typically indexed for inflation (specifically the Consumer Price Index and previously the Retail Prices Index) as required by law for registered pension plans. Inflation during an employee's retirement affects the purchasing power of the pension; the higher the inflation rate, the lower the purchasing power of a fixed annual pension. This effect can be mitigated by providing annual increases to the pension at the rate of inflation (usually capped, for instance at 5% in any given year). This method is advantageous for the employee, because it stabilizes the purchasing power of pensions to some extent.

If the pension plan allows for early retirement, payments are often reduced to recognize that the retirees will receive the payouts for longer periods of time. In the US, (under the ERISA rules), any reduction factor less than or equal to the actuarial early retirement reduction factor is acceptable.

Many DB plans include early retirement provisions to encourage employees to retire early, before the attainment of normal retirement age (usually age 65). Some of those provisions come in the form of additional temporary or supplemental benefits, which are payable to a certain age, usually before attaining normal retirement age.

== US laws and regulations ==
In the US, defined benefit (DB) pension plans are subject to a complex framework of laws and regulations designed to ensure fairness, solvency, and proper tax treatment. The key laws and regulatory standards that govern DB plans include:

- IRC § 401(a)(17): Qualified DB plans must apply compensation limits for benefit calculations. Plans must use the lesser of the employee’s actual compensation or the IRS-established cap (the "401(a)(17) limit"), which is adjusted annually for inflation. For example, in 2025, the limit is $345,000.
- IRC § 415(b): Qualified plans must limit the maximum benefit a participant can receive. As of 2025, the maximum annual benefit payable at retirement age (typically age 62–65) is $275,000, subject to reductions for earlier retirement or adjustments for forms of benefit other than single life annuities.
- Non-Discrimination Rules (IRC §§ 410(b), 401(a)(4), 401(a)(26)): These provisions prevent pension plans from disproportionately benefiting highly compensated employees (HCEs). Plans must cover a broad cross-section of employees, and benefits must not be structured in a way that unfairly favors executives over rank-and-file workers.
- IRC § 417(e): Rules governing distributions from DB plans. If a lump sum distribution is offered, it must be calculated using specified mortality tables and interest rates (e.g., the IRS "applicable interest rates"). Additionally, any election of a non-joint-and-survivor annuity requires spousal consent, with minimum survivor benefit requirements (typically 50% continuation for spouses).
- Anti-Assignment and Anti-Garnishment Rules (ERISA § 206(d)): Pension benefits are protected from creditors. Plan participants cannot assign their benefits to another party, nor can benefits generally be garnished to satisfy personal debts, with limited exceptions like IRS levies or qualified domestic relations orders (QDROs).
- Top-Heavy Rules (IRC § 416): If a DB plan disproportionately benefits "key employees" (such as owners or executives), it must provide a minimum benefit (often 2% of compensation per year of service) to non-key employees. Plans must annually test their "top-heavy" status.
- Minimum Funding Standards (IRC § 412 and ERISA Title IV): Employers must make minimum required contributions based on actuarial valuations. Underfunded plans can trigger excise taxes and additional reporting requirements. Funding rules were notably tightened by the Pension Protection Act of 2006 (PPA), which established new funding thresholds and accelerates corrective actions if funding levels drop too low.
- Pension Benefit Guaranty Corporation (PBGC) Coverage: Most private-sector DB plans must pay annual premiums to the PBGC, which provides insurance for promised pension benefits in the event of plan sponsor insolvency. Premiums include both a flat-rate charge and a variable-rate premium based on plan underfunding.
- ERISA Fiduciary Standards (ERISA §§ 403–404): Plan fiduciaries must manage pension plan assets prudently and in the exclusive interest of participants. Violations of fiduciary duties can result in personal liability for losses to the plan.

The basic premise behind most rules are that an employer cannot use a qualified pension plan to give highly paid employees (or owners) a lot of money through a qualified plan (through this tax advantaged financial instrument). The reason behind compensating employees through a bonus system is relevant to boundaries originally created by “capping” hourly wages for experienced employees. This allows employees to remain in a ‘lower tax bracket.’ <IRS Form Ref.>.

== Funding ==
Defined benefit plans may be either funded or unfunded.

=== Unfunded pension plans ===
In an unfunded defined benefit pension, no assets are set aside and the benefits are paid for by the employer or other pension sponsor as and when they are paid. This method of financing is known as Pay-as-you-go (PAYGO or PAYG). In the US, ERISA explicitly forbids pay as you go for private sector, qualified, defined benefit plans.

However, this system is often used in public pension systems. For example, all OECD countries including the U.S. rely on some form of a PAYG system.

==== Unfunded pension systems in practice ====
PAYG is based on constant balance between two sides: contributions and benefits. People of working age pay part of their salary to the system and from this benefits are paid to people already in retirement. As time passes the contributors age until eventually they retire and claim benefits for themselves becoming pensioners supported by current working age generation. The size of their benefits is often determined based on their contributions which were percentage amounts of their salary, though this is not a rule. For example, in Denmark the size of old age pension is uniform for all retirees.

The PAYG nature of state pension systems is often cited as the main cause of the current pension crisis. This is because the dependency ratio or the number of people in retirement age over the size of the current working population is constantly growing and therefore the balance of contributions and benefits is broken resulting in deficits that need to be financed from government budget or addressed by increasing the contribution size.

As result of this constant pressure many countries have stopped trying to cover the pension of their citizens only by PAYG schemes and instead switched to multi-pillar pension systems, which are generally considered to better diversify against many risks of pension provision. In those systems PAYG plays only supplementary role with occupational pension plans and state-supported private pension plans as the other “pillars” of pension. While not perfect those systems are less susceptible to ageing risk.

==== Life cycle of PAYG systems ====
The ageing related problems are actually not just a matter of specific demography, it has been suggested that each PAYG system passes through three stages – the young, the expanding and the mature. This must inevitably lead to situation in which it is problematic to provide the funds for it and even harder to reform the system.

Stage 1 sees the introduction of PAYG pensions, this is most often in time when the country’s population is rather young with more than fifteen working age and contributing individuals for each pensioner. The coverage of working population is still quite small. The system is in surplus, which allows government to increase the size of old age pensions, providing much bigger return to their contributions then they would receive on the market. This stage could have been observed in Germany in 1920 or in Brazil, Argentina and other Latin American countries in 1950.

Stage 2 starts to present first challenges. Members of the founding generation start to retire and the number of contributors to pensioners drops to about eight to fourteen. The schemes are much more wide spread covering about third of the working population. This stage sees greater expansion of the system introducing it also to lower income groups, while still keeping the benefits high. While such expansion is often welcomed by the population, which expects great pension benefits in the future, it starts to produce deficits and accumulate debt (mainly in form of implicit debt, based on pension promises), often up to 25% or 50% of GDP. Brazil and Turkey in year 1995 can be seen as great examples of this stage.

Lastly countries reach stage 3. In this stage number of contributors to pensioners is only about six to one. Most of the population is covered however the debt starts to grow threatening the sustainability of the system. There is pressure from younger population to reduce the pension benefits and in turn contributions, but this is met with protest from middle and old-aged population who have contributed for most of their lives and want to receive their pensions. Those obstacles postpone any reform attempts, with many countries reaching into their budgets to help finance the pension expenditure, which now reaches double digits of GDP percentage. This stage can be observed in many European countries, especially those in the former Soviet bloc. While some countries like Poland passed their pension reform already, others like Czech Republic have yet to do anything about it

=== Funded pension plans ===
In a funded plan, contributions from the employer, and sometimes also from plan members, are invested in a fund towards meeting the benefits. The future returns on the investments, and the future benefits to be paid, are not known in advance, so there is no guarantee that a given level of contributions will be enough to meet the benefits. Typically, the contributions to be paid are regularly reviewed in a valuation of the plan's assets and liabilities, carried out by an actuary to ensure that the pension fund will meet future payment obligations. This means that in a defined benefit pension, investment risk and investment rewards are typically assumed by the sponsor/employer and not by the individual. If a plan is not well-funded, the plan sponsor may not have the financial resources to continue funding the plan.

For example, the United States Social Security system is a funded program. It is funded through a payroll tax (FICA) that is paid by employees and employers. The proceeds of this tax are paid into the Social Security Trust Funds which had a balance of $2.804 trillion as of July 2014. The funding status of US Social Security is reviewed annually by the Social Security Office of the Chief Actuary. A report on the status of US Social Security is issued annually by the Social Security Trustees, projecting funding needs out 75 years.

In many countries, such as the USA, the UK and Australia, most private defined benefit plans are funded, because governments there provide tax incentives to funded plans (in Australia they are mandatory). In the United States, private employers must pay an insurance-type premium to the Pension Benefit Guaranty Corporation (PBGC), a government agency whose role is to encourage the continuation and maintenance of voluntary private pension plans and provide timely and uninterrupted payment of pension benefits. When the PBGC steps in and takes over a pension plan, it provides payment of pension benefits up to certain maximum amounts, which are indexed for inflation. The PBGC receives its funding from several sources, including insurance premiums from sponsors of participating plans, assets of the plans it has taken over, recoveries from bankrupt companies' estates, and investment earnings. The PBGC's liabilities are not explicitly backed by the U.S. government.

One of the growing concerns with defined benefit plans is that the level of future obligations will outpace the value of assets held by the plan. This "underfunding" dilemma can be faced by any type of defined benefit plan, private or public, but it is most acute in governmental and other public plans where political pressures and less rigorous accounting standards can result in inadequate contributions to fund commitments to employees and retirees. Many states and municipalities across the country now face chronic pension crises.

== Advantages and drawbacks ==
Traditional defined benefit plan designs (because of their typically flat accrual rate and the decreasing time for interest discounting as people get closer to retirement age) tend to exhibit a J-shaped accrual pattern of benefits, where the present value of benefits grows quite slowly early in an employee's career and accelerates significantly in mid-career: in other words it costs more to fund the pension for older employees than for younger ones (an "age bias"). Defined benefit pensions tend to be less portable than defined contribution plans, even if the plan allows a lump sum cash benefit at termination. Most plans, however, pay their benefits as an annuity, so retirees do not bear the risk of low investment returns on contributions or of outliving their retirement income. The open-ended nature of these risks to the employer is the reason given by many employers for switching from defined benefit to defined contribution plans over recent years. However the investment returns can exceed the actuarial estimate. Employees do not benefit from the resulting surplus. The risks to the employer can sometimes be mitigated by discretionary elements in the benefit structure, for instance in the rate of increase granted on accrued pensions, both before and after retirement.

The age bias, reduced portability and open ended risk make defined benefit plans better suited to large employers with less mobile workforces, such as the public sector (which has open-ended support from taxpayers).

The "cost" of a defined benefit plan is not easily calculated, and requires an actuary or actuarial software. However, even with the best of tools, the cost of a defined benefit plan will always be an estimate based on economic and financial assumptions. These assumptions include the average retirement age and lifespan of the employees, the returns to be earned by the pension plan's investments and any additional taxes or levies, such as those required by the Pension Benefit Guaranty Corporation in the U.S. So, for this arrangement, the benefit is relatively secure but the contribution is uncertain even when estimated by a professional.

== Examples ==
Many countries offer state-sponsored retirement benefits, beyond those provided by employers, which are funded by payroll or other taxes. The United States Social Security system is similar to a defined benefit pension arrangement, albeit one that is constructed differently than a pension offered by a private employer.

Individuals that have worked in the UK and have paid certain levels of national insurance deductions can expect an income from the state pension scheme after their normal retirement. The state pension is currently divided into two parts: the basic state pension, State Second [tier] Pension scheme called S2P. Individuals will qualify for the basic state pension if they have completed sufficient years contribution to their national insurance record. The S2P pension scheme is earnings related and depends on earnings in each year as to how much an individual can expect to receive. It is possible for an individual to forgo the S2P payment from the state, in lieu of a payment made to an appropriate pension scheme of their choice, during their working life. For more details see UK pension provision.

In recent years, some new approaches to 'defined benefit plans' have emerged, such as a cash balance plan which has become more prevalent for larger companies. Under a cash balance type of plan, benefits are computed as a percentage of each employee's account balance. Employers specify a contribution—usually based on a percentage of the employee's earnings—and a rate of interest on that contribution that will provide a predetermined amount at retirement, usually in the form of a lump sum. "A cash balance plan is a defined benefit plan that defines the benefit in terms that are more characteristic of a defined contribution plan. In other words, a cash balance plan defines the promised benefit in terms of a stated account balance."

== See also ==
- Bureau of Labor Statistics
- Cash balance plan
- Defined contribution plan
- Employee Benefits Security Administration
- Employee Retirement Income Security Act
- Pension
- Pension Benefit Guaranty Corporation
- Retirement
- Unfunded mandate
