= Pension Benefit Guaranty Corporation =

American government-owned company

Pension Benefit Guaranty Corporation (United States)

Agency overview
- Formed: September 2, 1974
- Headquarters: 445 12th Street SW, Washington, D.C. 20024
- Employees: 953 (2016)
- Annual budget: $493.312 million (FY 2023 Budget Justification)
- Agency executive: Janet Dhillon
- Website: www.pbgc.gov

The Pension Benefit Guaranty Corporation (PBGC) is a United States federally chartered corporation created by the Employee Retirement Income Security Act of 1974 (ERISA) to encourage the continuation and maintenance of voluntary private defined benefit pension plans, provide timely and uninterrupted payment of pension benefits, and keep pension insurance premiums at the lowest level necessary to carry out its operations. Subject to other statutory limitations, PBGC's single-employer insurance program pays pension benefits up to the maximum guaranteed benefit set by law to participants who retire at 65 ($6,750 a month, as of 2023). The benefits payable to insured retirees who start their benefits at ages other than 65 or elect survivor coverage are adjusted to be equivalent in value. The maximum monthly guarantee for the multiemployer program is far lower and more complicated ($12,870 a year for a participant with 30 years of credited service).

In fiscal year 2025, PBGC’s Single-Employer Program reported $152.3 billion in assets and $90 billion in liabilities, for a positive net position of $62.2 billion. It paid more than $6.4 billion in retirement benefits to nearly 926,000 retirees in PBGC-trusteed plans. The Multiemployer Program reported $4.9 billion in assets and $2.3 billion in liabilities, for a positive net position of $2.6 billion. During the year, PBGC paid $6.2 billion in special financial assistance to 48 plans and $169 million in traditional financial assistance to 100 insolvent plans.

== Revenues and expenditures ==
PBGC is not funded by general tax revenues. Its funds come from four sources:

- Insurance premiums paid by sponsors of defined benefit pension plans;
- Assets held by the pension plans it takes over;
- Recoveries of unfunded pension liabilities from plan sponsors' bankruptcy estates; (Note: When the PBGC takes over an insolvent pension plan, it becomes a general creditor of the plan sponsor.) and
- Investment income.

PBGC pays monthly retirement benefits to more than 800,000 retirees in nearly 5,000 terminated single-employer defined benefit pension plans. Including those who have not yet retired and participants in multiemployer plans receiving financial assistance, PBGC is responsible for the current and future pensions of about 1.5 million people and insures the pensions of more than 35 million participants in ongoing plans.

== Investment policy ==
The Agency has a stated goal of using a liability-driven investment strategy to minimize volatility and achieve its stated income goals. As a result, the heaviest target weightings in its portfolio are aimed at investment grade U.S. bonds and money market funds.

As of its April 2019 Investment Policy Statement the agency had approved target ranges for its Investment Trust as follows:

Return-Seeking Assets:

U.S. Equities, including publicly traded U.S. REITs: 0% to 15%

International Equities (Developed and Emerging): 0% to 15%

U.S. and International Bonds (High Yield, Developed, and Emerging Markets): 0% to 10%

Private Equity and Private Real Estate (from terminated plans): No range specified

Liability-Hedging Assets: U.S. Bonds (Nominal and Real) and Money Market: 65% to 90%

The investment statement adds that as the funded ratio improves the weighting toward liability hedging assets should also increase, in accordance with the agency's LDI investment strategy.

While there is no target allocation for private equity, debt, or real estate investment, the agency does allow for inherited investments from absorbed plans due to their illiquid nature.

As of September 30, 2019 the trust's asset allocation stands at 81.72% fixed income investments, 14.82% equity securities, and 3.46% other securities including private equity, private debt, real estate investments, REITs and insurance contracts.

Smaller Asset Managers Pilot Program

Since 2016 the agency has implemented a program to allow smaller asset managers to oversee investment mandates within the Trust, covering U.S. investment grade bond allocations. The program was aimed at providing opportunities to asset managers with at least $250 million in assets under management, but less than the billions previously required by the agency.

C. S. McKee, LM Capital Group, Longfellow Investment Management, New Century Advisors, and Pugh Capital Management were awarded the inaugural U.S. core fixed income mandates in the program.

As of September 30, 2019, the total allocation awarded to five managers within the program totaled less than 1% of the total trust's assets.

Revolving Funds

The agency also maintains seven revolving funds, though only three are operational, which were authorized under the Employee Retirement Income Security Act of 1974 to hold premiums paid by single employer and multiemployer pension sponsors, transfers from the larger trust fund portfolio for benefit payments, and returns on investments from the fund itself. Federal law mandates that these specific funds only be invested by U.S. Treasury securities.

== Pension insurance programs ==
The single-employer program protects 30 million workers and retirees in 22,000 pension plans. The multiemployer program protects 10 million workers and retirees in 1,400 pension plans. Multiemployer plans are set up by collective bargaining agreements involving more than one unrelated employer, generally in one industry.

== Plan terminations ==
An employer can voluntarily ask to close its single-employer pension plan in either a standard or distress termination. In a standard termination, the plan must have enough money to pay all accrued benefits, whether vested or not, before the plan can end. After workers receive promised benefits, in the form of a lump sum payment or an insurance company annuity, PBGC's guarantee ends. More than 145,000 plans have gone through PBGC's standard termination process between 1975 and 2019. In a distress termination, where the plan does not have enough money to pay all benefits, the employer must prove severe financial distress – for instance the likelihood that continuing the plan would force the company to shut down. PBGC will pay guaranteed benefits, usually covering a large part of total earned benefits, and make strong efforts to recover funds from the employer.

In addition, PBGC may seek to terminate a single-employer plan without the employer's consent to protect the interests of workers, the plan or PBGC's insurance fund. PBGC must act to terminate a plan that cannot pay current benefits.

For multiemployer pension plans that are unable to pay guaranteed benefits when due, PBGC will provide financial assistance to the plan, usually a loan, so that retirees continue receiving their benefits.

Terminations are covered under Title IV of ERISA.

== Missing Participants Program ==
When a plan sponsor chooses to terminate their pension plan through the standard termination process, arrangements must be made to distribute benefits to each participant. When participants cannot be located or otherwise are not responsive, the termination process is delayed. Since 1996 sponsors of terminating insured single-employer defined benefit (DB) plans have the option to transfer the benefits for their "missing participants" to the PBGC or to purchase annuities from insurance companies and notify PBGC of the details. In 2018, PBGC expanded the Missing Participants Program (MPP) making it available to terminating defined contribution (DC) plans, multiemployer defined benefit plans and certain single-employer DB plans not covered by Title IV of ERISA.

PBGC indicates they are searching for more than 80,000 "lost" plan participants who are owed pensions. Individuals can call a dedicated toll-free number, 1-800-229-LOST (5678), to find out if they are due pension payments.

== Premium rates ==
Pension plans that are qualified under the U.S. tax code pay yearly insurance premiums to the PBGC based on the number of participants in the plan and the funded status of the plan.

The Bipartisan Budget Act, which was signed by President Obama on November 2, 2015, set PBGC premiums as follows for single-employer pension plans:

Flat-rate premium

- $64 per participant for plan years starting in 2016
- $69 per participant for plan years starting in 2017
- $74 per participant for plan years starting in 2018
- $80 per participant for plan years starting in 2019

The variable-rate premium, which is $30 per $1,000 of unfunded vested benefits for 2016, will continue to be indexed for inflation, but were scheduled to increase by an additional $3 for 2017, $4 for 2018, and $4 for 2019.

== Maximum guaranteed benefit ==
The maximum pension benefit guaranteed by PBGC is set by law and adjusted yearly. For plans that ended in 2023, workers who retired that year and at age 65 would receive up to $6,750.00 per month (or $81,000 per year) under PBGC's insurance program for single-employer plans.

Benefit payments starting at ages other than 65 are adjusted actuarially, which means the maximum guaranteed benefit is lower for those who retire early or when there is a benefit for a survivor. Alternatively, benefits are higher for those who retire after age 65. Additionally, the PBGC will not fully guarantee benefit improvements that were adopted within the five-year period prior to a plan's termination or benefits that are not payable over a retiree's lifetime.

Other limitations also apply to supplemental benefits in excess of normal retirement benefits, benefit increases within the last five years before a plan's termination, and benefits earned after a plan sponsor's bankruptcy.

For the multiemployer plans, the amount guaranteed is based on years of service. For plans that terminated after December 21, 2000, the PBGC insures 100 percent of the first $11 monthly payment per year of service and 75 percent of the next $33 monthly payment per year of service. For example, if a participant works 20 years in a plan that promises $19 per month per year of service, the PBGC guarantee would be $340 per month, rather than $380.

$\left[100\% \times \$11 \ + 75\% \times \left (\$19 - \$11 \right) \right] \times 20 = \$17 \times 20 = \$340$

A second example, which exceeds the $44 monthly payment per year of service: If a participant works 20 years in a plan that promises $100 per month per year of service, the PBGC guarantee would be $715 per month, rather than $2,000.

$\left[100\% \times \$11 \ + 75\% \times \$33 \right] \times 20 = \$35.75 \times 20 = \$715$

Multiemployer plans that terminated after 1980 but before December 21, 2000, had a maximum guarantee limit of 100 percent of the first $5 of the monthly benefit accrual rate and 75 percent of the next $15.

== Leadership ==
PBGC is headed by a Director, who reports to a board of directors consisting of the Secretaries of Labor, Commerce and Treasury, with the Secretary of Labor as chairman.

Under the Pension Protection Act of 2006, the Director of the PBGC is appointed by the President and confirmed by the Senate. Under prior law, PBGC's Board Chairman appointed an "Executive Director" who was not subject to confirmation.

== Pensions and bankruptcy ==
Several large legacy airlines have filed for bankruptcy reorganization in an attempt to renegotiate terms of pension liabilities. These debtors have asked the bankruptcy court to approve the termination of their old defined benefit plans insured by the PBGC. Although the PBGC resisted these requests, ultimately it assumed the plans.

The PBGC would like minimum required contributions to insured defined benefit pension plans be considered "administrative expenses" in bankruptcy, thereby obtaining priority treatment ahead of the unsecured creditors. The PBGC has generally lost on this argument, sometimes resulting in a benefit to general unsecured creditors.

In National Labor Relations Bd. v. Bildisco, 465 U.S. 513 (1984), the U.S. Supreme Court ruled that Bankruptcy Code section 365(a) "includes within it collective-bargaining agreements subject to the National Labor Relations Act, and that the Bankruptcy Court may approve rejection of such contracts by the debtor-in-possession upon an appropriate showing." The ruling came in spite of arguments that the employer should not use bankruptcy to breach contractual promises to make pension payments resulting from collective bargaining.

General bankruptcy principles hold that executory contracts are avoidable in practice, because neither party has fulfilled its part of the bargain and thus breach by either party only gives rise to expectation damages. Damages awards after commencement of a bankruptcy filing results in claims that take after more senior creditors. They are relegated to the status of general creditors because while breach would occur after filing of the bankruptcy petition, the contract was entered into before the filing. If a creditor is a general unsecured creditor and there is not enough money, they usually are not paid; so as a matter of practical economics, if the downturn in a company's fortunes which resulted in bankruptcy makes the performance of an executory contract less valuable than its breach, the rational company would breach. There would be no negative monetary consequences of such breach because there would be no money left for the other contract party to take because in practice general unsecured creditors are left with nothing.

In Bildisco, the Court also ruled that under the Bankruptcy Code as written at that time, an employer in Chapter 11 bankruptcy "does not commit an unfair labor practice when, after the filing of a bankruptcy petition but before court-approved rejection of the collective-bargaining agreement, it unilaterally modifies or terminates one or more provisions of the agreement." After the Bildisco decision, Congress amended the Bankruptcy Code by adding a subsection (f) to section 1113 (effective for cases that commenced on or after July 10, 1984):

(f) No provision of this title shall be construed to permit a trustee to unilaterally terminate or alter any provisions of a collective bargaining agreement prior to compliance with the provisions of this section.

According to commentator Nicholas Brannick, "Despite the appearance of protection for the PBGC's interest in the event of termination, the Bankruptcy Code frequently strips the PBGC of the protection provided under ERISA. Under ERISA, termination liability may arise on the date of termination, but the lien that protects the PBGC's interest in that liability must be perfected [to be protected in bankruptcy]." The retention of title as a security interest, the creation of lien, or any other direct or indirect mode of disposing of or parting with property or an interest in property is a "transfer" for purposes of the U.S. Bankruptcy Code (see 11 U.S.C. § 101(54)). Some transfers may be avoidable by the bankruptcy trustee under various Code provisions. Further, under ordinary principles of bankruptcy law, a lien or other security interest that is unperfected (i.e., a lien that is not valid against parties other than the debtor) at the time of case commencement is generally unenforceable against a bankruptcy trustee. Once the bankruptcy case has commenced, the law generally stays any act to attempt to perfect a lien that was not perfected prior to case commencement (see 11 U.S.C. § 362(a)(4)). Thus, the PBGC with a lien that has not yet been perfected at the time of case commencement may find itself in the same position as the general unsecured creditors.

== Annual Pension Insurance Data Book ==
PBGC has published the Pension Insurance Data Book since 1996 to present detailed statistics for the single-employer and multiemployer plans that the agency insures.

The single-employer section gives all data and statistics on single-employer programs.

- Section S-3 through S-19 are the claims tables. These tables show all of the claims brought by single-employer DB plans to PBGC.
- Section S-20 through S-29 are the payment table. These tables show how much PBGC is paying out every year in insurance protection.
- Section S-30 through S-38 are the insured tables. These tables show how many participants are insured under the PBGC.
- Section S-40 through S-43 are the premium tables. These tables show how much premiums insured pension plans are paying.
- Section S-44 though S-52 show the underfunded Plans, overfunded Plans, and the funding ratios by NAIC business code, state, and participant count.
- Section S-54 through S-59 provide statistics on plan partial risk transfer activity.

The multiemployer section, the M section, follows a similar organization.

== Pension Protection Act of 2006 ==
The Pension Protection Act of 2006 represents the most significant pension legislation since ERISA. Some of the provisions of the Act that affect the PBGC include:

- The method for calculating the "variable-rate" PBGC premium is changed.
- If PBGC takes over a terminated plan, the guarantee of employees' pension benefits is frozen as of the date of the plan sponsor's bankruptcy filing, which may be months or years before the plan terminates.
- The PBGC's guarantee of pension benefits that become payable on a plant shutdown is limited if the shutdown occurred within five years of the bankruptcy filing.
- The complicated rules that govern the PBGC's pension guarantee for business owners are simplified.
- If PBGC takes over a terminated plan, the plan sponsor is required to pay a "termination premium" of $1,250 per participant per year for three years.

== No insurance for defined contribution plans ==
One reason Congress enacted ERISA was "to prevent the 'great personal tragedy' suffered by employees whose vested benefits are not paid when pension plans are terminated." When a defined benefit plan is properly funded by its sponsor, its assets should be approximately equal to its liability, and any shortfall (including benefit improvements) should be amortized in a relatively short period of time. Before ERISA, employers and willing unions could agree to increase benefits with little thought to how to pay for them. A classic case of the unfortunate consequences of an underfunded pension plan is the 1963 shutdown of Studebaker automobile operations in South Bend, Indiana, in which 4,500 workers lost 85% of their vested benefits. One of ERISA's stated intentions was to minimize underfunding in defined benefit plans.

Defined contribution plans, by contrast and by definition, are always "fully funded" so Congress saw no need to provide insurance protection for participants in defined contribution plans. The Enron scandal in 2001 demonstrated one potential problem with defined contribution plans: the company had strongly encouraged its workers to invest their 401(k) plans in their employer itself, violating primary investment guidelines about diversification. When Enron went bankrupt, many workers lost not only their jobs but also most of the value of their retirement savings. Congress imposed fiduciary liability upon employers inside Section 404 of ERISA.

== See also ==
- Bankruptcy in the United States
- Federal Deposit Insurance Corporation
- Kline-Miller Multiemployer Pension Reform Act of 2014
- Pension
- Pension Protection Act of 2006
- Pension Rights Center
- Securities Investor Protection Corporation
- Social insurance
- Title 29 of the Code of Federal Regulations
