= Fundraising =

Process of gathering donations

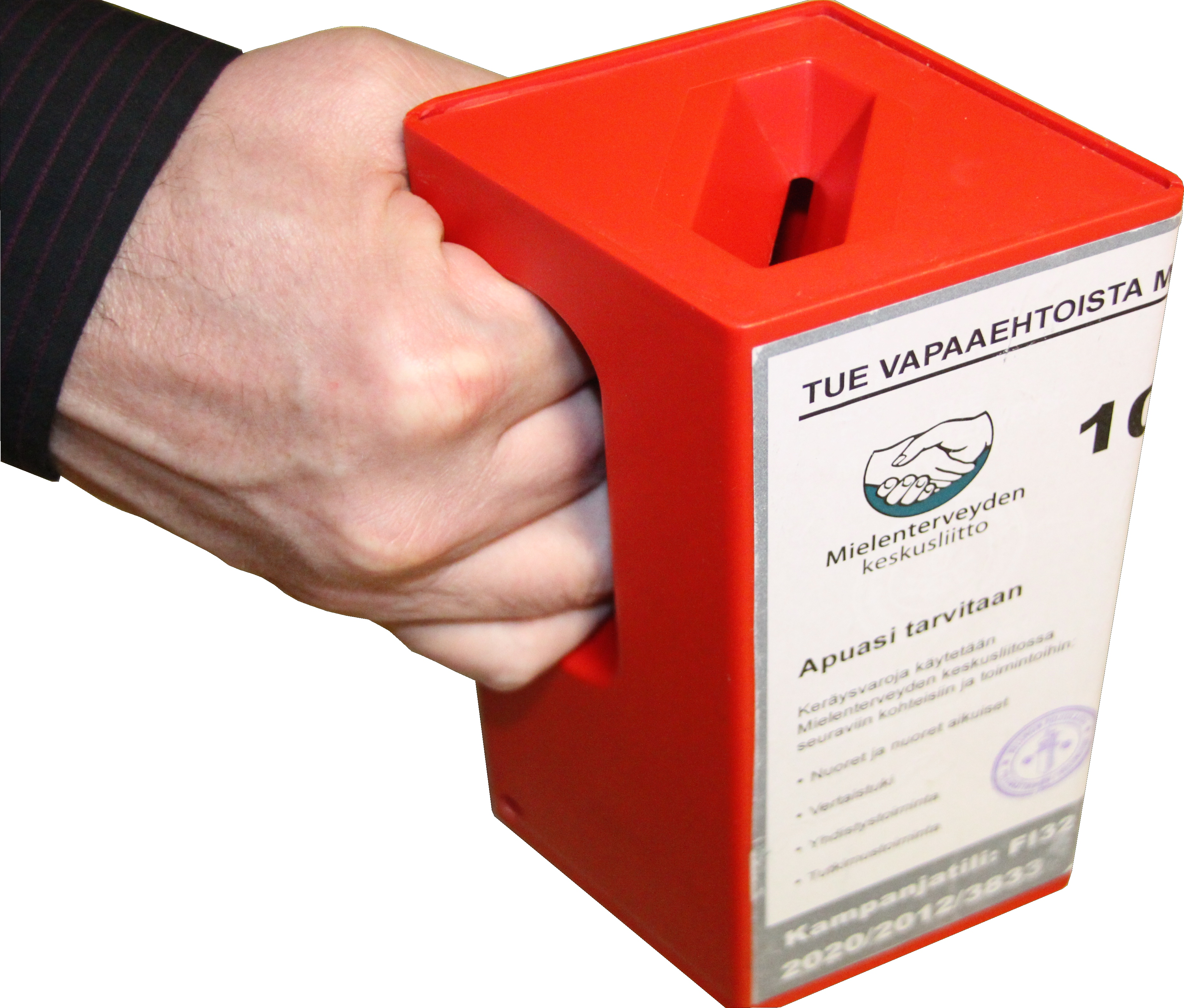
Door to door fundraising frequently involves a hand-held collection box.

Fundraising or fund-raising is the process of seeking and gathering voluntary financial contributions by engaging individuals, businesses, charitable foundations, or governmental agencies. Although fundraising typically refers to efforts to gather money for nonprofit organizations, it is sometimes used to refer to the identification and solicitation of investors or other sources of capital for for-profit enterprises.

Traditionally, fundraising has consisted mostly of asking for donations through face-to-face fundraising, such as door-knocking. In recent years, though, new forms such as online fundraising or grassroots fundraising have emerged.

== Organizations ==
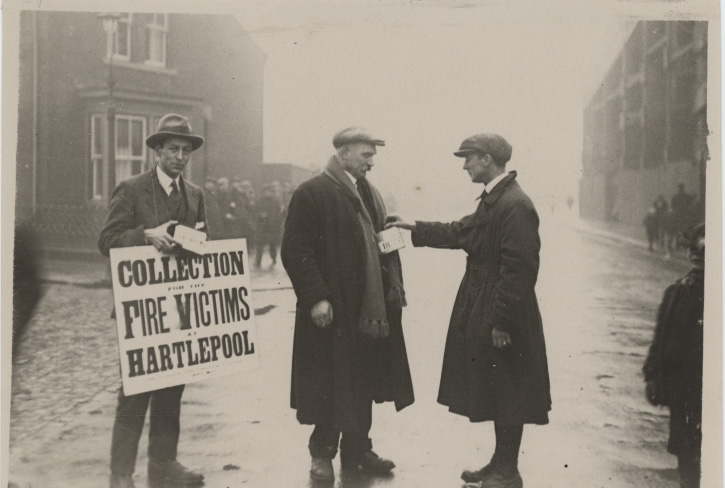
Two men collecting for the victims of The Great Timber Yard Fire in Hartlepool, 1922. Set up by the mayor of Hartlepool the day after the blaze, the fund soon gained popular support from places all over the region, such as Durham and Newcastle, as well as from further afield.

Fundraising is a significant way that non-profit organizations may obtain the money for their operations. These operations can involve a very broad array of concerns such as religious or philanthropic groups such as research organizations, public broadcasters, political campaigns and environmental issues.

Some examples of charitable organizations include student scholarship merit awards for athletic or academic achievements, humanitarian and ecological concerns, disaster relief, human rights, research, and other social issues.

Some of the most substantial fundraising efforts in the United States are conducted by colleges and universities. Commonly the fundraising, or "development" / "advancement", program, makes a distinction between annual fund appeals and major campaigns. Most institutions use professional development officers to conduct superior fundraising appeals for both the entire institution or individual colleges and departments (e.g. School of Art, School of Math, School of Science, etc., as well as campus institutions like athletics and libraries). The number of people involved, often having socialized at such "fund-raisings", will vary widely depending on the size of the institution they sponsor.

Equally important are fundraising efforts by virtually all recognized religious groups throughout the world. These efforts are organized on a local, national, and global level. Sometimes, such funds will go exclusively toward assisting the basic needs of others, while money may at other times be used only for evangelism or proselytism. Usually, religious organizations mix the two, which can sometimes cause tension.

Fundraising also plays a major role in political campaigns. This fact, despite numerous campaign finance reform laws, continues to be a highly controversial topic in American politics. Political action committees (PACs) are the best-known organizations that back candidates and political parties, though others such as 527 groups also have an impact. Some advocacy organizations conduct fundraising for-or-against policy issues in an attempt to influence legislation.

While public broadcasters are completely government-funded in much of the world, there are many countries where some funds must come from donations from the public. In the United States less than 15% of local public broadcasting stations' funding comes from the federal government. Pledge drives, a type of annual giving, commonly occur about three times each year, usually lasting one to two weeks each time. Viewership and listenership often decline significantly during funding periods, so special programming may be aired in order to keep regular viewers and listeners interested.

== Direct marketing in fundraising ==
The techniques of direct marketing have been adapted in the nonprofit sector. The alignment of direct marketing approaches with fundraising is believed to have facilitated its adoption by associations in the mid-1970s. The results obtained through the intensive use of direct marketing techniques triggered increasing interest from associations. While only a few dozen were using major direct marketing channels in 1975, several hundred commonly utilize them today.

In the case of associations, direct marketing enhances the anonymity and intimacy of donations, but it can also serve as a tool for developing visibility and image.

=== Automatic withdrawals and street fundraising ===
Many associations have transformed their one-time fundraising into automatic withdrawal collections following the example of Doctors Without Borders. This progression is similar to that resulting from another form of fundraising introduced in Austria in 1995: "street fundraising".

Street fundraising involves recruiting new donors in public places, approaching them to introduce the association and propose support for its actions through assured automatic withdrawal donations. Unlike traditional fundraising, it does not collect cash or checks. It usually involves promises of donations. Street fundraising aims to establish a dialogue, create a connection with donors, often younger, engaged, and loyal.

== Sources ==
According to Giving USA 2024, a study of charitable giving in the United States, the sources of funds donated to charities are as follows:

Rank	Source	Total Giving	% of Total Giving
1	Individuals	$392.45 billion	66%
2	Foundations	$109.81 billion	19%
3	Bequest	$45.84 billion	8%
4	Corporations	$44.40 billion	7%

*NOTE – This chart does not include government grants, which are technically contracts to perform a service, not a charitable gift.

Fundraising is just one of several revenue sources for a nonprofit organization. Additional revenue can come in the form of grants from government agencies, endowments, and sales and services. Income from an endowment is not strictly considered fundraising, but rather the result of previous fundraising efforts' investment.

=== Individual donors ===
The donor base (often called a "donor file" or simply "constituents") for higher education includes alumni, parents, friends, private foundations, and corporations. Gifts of appreciated property are important components of such efforts because the tax advantage they confer on the donor encourages larger gifts. The process of soliciting appreciated assets is called planned giving. Charitable giving by individuals in the U.S. was estimated to be $392.45 billion in 2024.

The established development programs at institutions of higher learning include prospect identification, prospect research and verification of the prospect's viability, cultivation, solicitation, and finally stewardship, the latter being the process of keeping donors informed about how past support has been used. When goods or professional services are donated to an organization rather than cash, this is called an in-kind gift.

A number of charities and non-profit organizations are increasingly using the internet as a means to raise funds; this practice is referred to as online fundraising. In addition, crowdfunding has begun to be used as a method to engage small-donation donors for small, specific opportunities.

Comparing traditional and online fundraising, 55% of donors worldwide prefer to give online with a credit or debit card, while 12% prefer to give by bank/wire transfer, and only 8% choose to donate in cash. 51% of donors are enrolled in a recurring giving program with 87% of recurring donors opting to give monthly. Worldwide, 45% of donors donate to crowdfunding campaigns that benefit NPOs, 13% create online peer-to-peer fundraising campaigns to benefit NPOs, and 60% have donated to an NPO in response to the COVID-19 pandemic.

=== Grants from agencies, foundations or corporations ===
Non-profit organizations also raise funds through competing for grant funding. Grants are offered by governmental units and private foundations/charitable trusts to non-profit organizations for the benefit of all parties to the transaction. Charitable giving by foundations in the U.S. was estimated to be $109.81 billion in 2024.

Charitable giving by corporations in the U.S. was estimated to be $44.4 billion in 2024. This consists of corporate grants as well as matching gift and volunteer grants. 65% of Fortune 500 companies offer employee matching gift programs and 40% offer volunteer grant programs. These are charitable giving programs set up by corporations in which the company matches donations made by employees to eligible nonprofit organizations or provides grants to eligible nonprofit organizations as a way to recognize and promote employee volunteerism.

=== Bequests ===
A bequest is a gift that is written into a donor's will that is fulfilled after their death. These gifts can be written in the will itself or added as a codicil (addendum) after the main will has been ratified. These gifts are separated from individual giving by Giving USA to illustrate the importance of Planned Giving, which is a type of fundraising that focuses on asking donors to include charitable gifts in their estate plans.

=== Sales and services ===
While fundraising often involves the donation of money as an outright gift, money may also be generated by selling a product of some kind, also known as product fundraising. Girl Scouts of the USA are well known for selling cookies in order to generate funds. It is also common to see on-line impulse sales links to be accompanied by statements that a proportion of proceeds will be directed to a particular charitable foundation. Tax law may require differentiating between the cost of an item versus its gift value, such as a $100.00 per person dinner, for a $25.00 cost meal. Fundraising often involves recognition to the donor, such as naming rights or adding donors to an honor roll or other general recognition. Charity Ad Books are another form of donation for recognition, sponsorship or selling of ads often in an event related program or group directory.

== Purposes ==
Fundraising is typically undertaken for one of two broad objectives: Opex (Operational Expenditure) or Capex (Capital Expenditure). Opex includes salary, overheads such as electricity, rent and transport, whereas Capex includes expenses such as infrastructure, equipment or supplies. Therefore, organizations raise funds to support capital projects, endowments, or operating expenses of current programs.

Capital fundraising is when fundraising is undertaken to raise major sums for a building or endowment; generally such funds are kept separate from operating funds. This is often done over a period of time (in a capital campaign) to encourage donors to give more than they would normally give and tap donors, especially corporations and foundations who would not otherwise give. A capital campaign normally begins with a private phase before launching a public appeal.

Many non-profit organizations solicit funds for a financial endowment, which is a sum of money that is invested to generate an annual return. Although endowments may be created when a sizable gift is received from an individual or family, often as directed in a will upon the death of a family member, they are more typically the result of many gifts over time from a variety of sources.

== Fundraising methods ==
=== Fundraising events ===
A fundraising event (also called a fundraiser) is an event or campaign whose primary purpose is to raise money for a cause, charity or non-profit organization. Fundraisers often benefit charitable, non-profit, religious, or non-governmental organizations, though there are also fundraisers that benefit for-profit companies and individuals.

Special events are another method of raising funds. These range from formal dinners to benefit concerts to walkathons. Events are used to increase visibility and support for an organization as well as raising funds. Events can feature activities for the group such as speakers, a dance, an outing or entertainment, to encourage group participation and giving. Events can also include fundraising methods such as a raffle or charity auction. Events often feature notable sponsors or honoree. Events often feature a charity "ad book" as a program guide for the event. This can also be another fundraiser providing members, supporters and vendors an opportunity to show their support of the group at the event by way of placing an ad-like page. Events and their associated fundraisers can be a major source of a group's revenue, visibility and donor relations.

One specific type of event is the "ad book" fundraiser, where those who wish to give funds to a fundraising group do so through the sponsorship or statement within a book of advertisements.

Online fundraising pages have become very popular for people taking part in activities such as charities and crowdfunding. Those pages facilitate online payments in support of the charity.

Popular charity fundraisers in major American cities include lavish black-tie gala benefit dinners that honor celebrities, philanthropists, and business leaders who help to fundraise for the event's goals through solicitations of their social and business connections.

=== Donor relationship and cultivation ===
Often called donor cultivation, relationship building is the foundation on which most fundraising takes place. Most fundraising development strategies divide donors into a series of categories based on the amount and frequency of donations. For instance, annual giving and recurring gifts represent the base of a fundraising pyramid. This would be followed by mid-level gifts, planned gifts, major gifts, and principal gifts.

More sophisticated strategies use tools to overlay demographic and other market segmentation data against their database of donors in order to more precisely customize communication and more effectively target resources. In the United States, there are DataAxle's Apogee, Epsilon, Moore's SimioCloud, and Wiland. Research by Peter Maple in the UK shows that charities generally underinvest in good marketing research spending around a quarter of what an equivalent sized for profit company might spend.

Donor relations and stewardship professionals support fundraisers by recognizing and thanking donors, and demonstrating the impact of their donations in a fashion that will cultivate future giving to nonprofit organizations.

Recent research by Adrian Sargeant and the Association of Fundraising Professionals' Fundraising Effectiveness Project suggests the sector has a long way to go in improving the quality of donor relations. The sector generally loses 50–60% of its newly acquired donors between their first and second donations and one in three, year on year thereafter. The economics of regular or sustained giving are rather different, but even then organizations routinely lose 30% of their donors from one year to the next.

=== Capital and comprehensive campaigns ===
A capital campaign is "an intensive fundraising effort designed to raise a specified sum of money within a defined time period to meet the varied asset-building needs of an organization". Asset-building activities include the construction, renovation or expansion of facilities (for example, a new building), the acquisition or improvement of land, equipment, or other items, and additions to a financial endowment. Two characteristics set capital campaigns apart from other forms of fundraising activities. First, "the gifts solicited are much larger than those generally sought during an annual fund". Second, "pledges are emphasized as commitments payable over a number of years convenient to the donor or through the transfer of appreciated real or personal property".

Various types of capital campaigns have been identified. The traditional "brick and mortar" campaign, focused on building construction or improvements, was considered a "once in a lifetime" campaign in the past because of the ambitious goals of the campaign. Today, however, organizations frequently schedule capital campaigns every five to ten years, and "the megagoals announced by large institutions often are the result of 'counting everything' during a five-to seven-year campaign period".

A second type of campaign is the comprehensive, integrated, or total development campaign, which aims for a longer fundraising program based on a long-term analysis of the organization's needs and direction. This form of campaign can wrap together capital projects, endowment and operating expenses as its purpose, and use a variety of fundraising activities, such as annual gift drives, which are "slower-paced and lack the intensity of the traditional capital campaign".

=== Accountable fundraising ===
Some non-profit organizations demonstrate greater accountability by showing donors the direct impact of their fundraising efforts. This accountability may comes in the form of a vote, where the members select a specific program or charity that they would like their money to go to. Another example is put in place a mechanism which allows donors to contraint usage of funds toward a specific purpose and closely monitor/allow spending to ensure proper usage.

=== Professional fundraisers ===
Many non-profit organizations take advantage of the services of professional fundraisers. These fundraisers may be paid for their services either through fees unrelated to the amounts of money to be raised, or by retaining a percentage of raised funds (percentage-based compensation). The latter approach is expressly forbidden under the Code of Ethics of the Association of Fundraising Professionals (AFP), a professional membership body. However, by far the most common practice of American non-profits is to employ a staff person whose primary responsibility is fund raising. This person is paid a salary like any other employee and is usually part of the organization's senior management team.

Some non-profit organizations nonetheless engage fundraisers who are paid a percentage of the funds they raise. In the United States, this ratio of funds retained to funds passed on to the non-profit is subject to reporting to a number of states' Attorneys General or Secretaries of State. This ratio is highly variable and subject to change over time and place, and it remains a point of contention between segments of the general public and non-profit organizations.

The senior fundraising manager of a non-profit organization, company, or corporation is called a development director. The position works closely with a chief financial officer (CFO) or treasurer. A director of development is chiefly responsible for bringing in revenue streams to a non-profit — including grants, donations, and special events — while a CFO oversees the fiscal management of the organization. A CFO is rarely assigned to write grant narratives, but may oversee the budget section of a grant application or a fiscal report. Some larger organizations, especially those with significant government grants, employ both a grants manager and a grant writer or director of development. A grants manager assists the CFO with grant reports and grant-related accounting. For organizations and companies seeking broader capital raising beyond grants and donations — such as equity investment or venture funding — specialist advisory firms may be engaged in place of or alongside traditional development staff. A development director is usually remunerated for their work, and in best practices for nonprofit organizations, development directors earn fixed salaries. Commission-based remuneration is still considered unethical by professional bodies such as the Grant Professionals Association (GPA) and the Association of Fundraising Professionals (AFP), though the prevalence of the practice varies with broader economic conditions.

The development director's primary responsibility is to oversee fundraising strategy, rather than to personally solicit funds. They are concerned with the overall growth of the organization — including staff, membership, budget, and assets — to maximize both its financial sustainability and public profile. They may write grants, research foundations and corporations, and oversee or implement other fundraising strategies, working largely behind the scenes to establish effective structures and processes. Compensation for this role is most strongly influenced by the size and type of organization, followed by geographic location and tenure.

=== Online and mobile fundraising ===
Online and mobile fundraising had become a popular fundraising method over the last few years due to its accessibility. Fundraising organizations are developing technical options like mobile apps and donate buttons to attract donors around the globe. Common online and mobile fundraising methods include online donation pages, text to give, mobile silent auctions, and peer to peer fundraising.

Since 2016, online giving has grown by 17% in the United States. In 2018, digital fundraising accounted for 8.5% percent of charitable donations and 24% of online donations were made on a mobile device in the United States.

== Taxation ==
Organizations in the United States established for charitable purposes are allowed to raise funds from many sources. They are given a specific designation by the Internal Revenue Service (IRS), commonly noted as 501(c)(3) organizations. Other nonprofits such as fraternal associations have different IRS designations, and may or may not be eligible to raise funds. Financial information on many nonprofits, including all nonprofits that file annual IRS 990 forms is available from GuideStar.

== See also ==
- Charity dating
- Crowd funding
- Direct mail fundraising
- Ethics of philanthropy
- Friendraising
- Grassroots fundraising
- Matching gift
- Moneybomb
- Street fundraising (including face-to-face and door-to-door fundraising)
- Volunteer grant
- Agency cost
- Chair (official)
- Corporate governance
- Corporate title
