= Chugging =

Chugging can mean:

- the practice of so-called 'charity mugging', a form of street fundraising
- a form of rapid drinking.
- a type of rocket engine combustion instability when broken down
- palm muting, guitar technique
