= The Pollyanna Principles =

- Author: Hildy Gottlieb
- Cover artist: Dimitri Petropolis
- Language: English
- Genre: Nonprofit, nonfiction, education, consulting
- Publisher: Resolve, Inc. d/b/a Renaissance Press
- Publication date: 2009
- Publication place: United States
- Media type: Print (Paperback)
- Pages: 360
- ISBN: 978-0-9818928-0-1

The Pollyanna Principles is a book by author Hildy Gottlieb, centered on community benefit organizations and the processes that make them genuinely beneficial to the community. Gottlieb's focus is on the transformation of static, inert or otherwise stagnant practices and systems used by Community Benefit Organizations, consultants of those organizations and funding organizations.

== Governance ==
The book then introduces the concepts of Governing for What Matters and Community Impact Planning. Governing for What Matters entails "leading, guiding, and making decisions on behalf of the Community," according to Gottlieb. While Community Impact Planning describes a means for organizations to institute true, positive change that has long-standing effects on communities, rather than having organizations react "incrementally to community circumstances and needs".

Gottlieb's principal contention regarding governance argues that governance, at its core, is simply the act of making decisions for and leadership of other individuals. Governance for community benefit boards, says Gottlieb, is generally broken down into what they hold themselves accountable for. Generally, most boards find that their accountability lies with what Gottlieb describes as the "means" - legal oversight, operational oversight and board mechanics (day-to-day operation of the board itself). What a board ought to governing for, argues Gottlieb, is creating a positive future for the communities they serve. The book asserts that in order to do this, the board must examine the impact to the community in every decision that they make.

This examination provides the framework for Community Impact Planning, also discussed within the Pollyanna Principles. This strategy, coupled with Gottlieb's philosophy about governance purports to "reinvent nonprofit organizations", as stated in the sub-title of the book. It is in these and the following chapters that Gottlieb offers examples and descriptions for how to put the principles into practice.

== Practical examples and application ==
In the final section of the book, Gottlieb details methods in developing and sustaining community benefit organization programs utilizing the aforementioned principles by using examples of organizations that have put the philosophies behind the principles into practice. The first example Gottlieb offers is the Southern Arizona Diaper Bank, the formation of which catalyzed the development of the core philosophies contained within the book itself. Another example found within the book describes the efforts of Saint Luke's Health Initiatives of Phoenix Arizona in creating a funding project for organizations within their community. Utilizing Gottlieb's strategies of crafting decisions around community impact, systemic aim and interconnected effort, SLHI created comprehensive programs that were effective in improving the future of the community they served.

== See also ==
- Community Engagement
- Pollyanna principle
- Friendraising
