= Employer matching program =

Employer's potential payment to 401(k) plan

In the United States, an employer matching program is an employer's potential payment to their 401(k) plan that depends on participating employees' contribution to the plan.

== Background ==
An employee's 401(k) plan is a retirement savings plan. The option of an employer matching program varies from company to company. It is not mandatory for a company to offer a contribution to their 401(k) plans. Contributions may benefit the company in various ways: as an employee benefit to attract and retain employees, as a business tax deduction, or as a safe harbor contribution to automatically pass certain annual testing of the plan required by the IRS and Department of Labor or to fulfill the plan's top-heavy provisions.

Many companies add to an employee's charity contribution. Through a corporate matching gift program, a company can double or even triple an employee's contribution toward a charity. This should not be confused with an employer matching program.

== "100% of the first 6%" ==
As of 2013, the most common matching program increased to 100% of the first 6%. The idea is that once the employee contributes 6% of their gross pay, the employer's contributions cease until the following year. If the employee contributes less than 6% of their gross income, the employee foregoes additional compensation from the employer available to them had they contributed up to the 6% limit. For example, an employee whose annual gross pay is $50,000 contributes $3,000 (6% of gross pay) would receive a $3,000 employer contribution. If the employee contributed more than $3,000 the employee would not receive additional employer contributions. If the employee only contributed $2,000 (4% of gross pay), they would only receive a $2,000 employer contribution leaving $1,000 of potential employer contribution on the table.

== Functions ==
In a 401(k) plan, the contributions are funded by the employee and are often matched by contributions from the employer and are made before taxes (or in the case of Roth deferrals, after taxes). These funds grow tax-free until the employee can withdraw them. Depending on the reason for withdrawal, the employee may be able to roll contributions and any investment gains into an Individual Retirement Account (IRA), where they continue to grow tax-free except for any required minimum distributions from the IRA to the account holder. The funds may also be switched if the employee changes employers. An employer's matching program is situational and depends on if a workplace offers one. According to the Profit Sharing/401k Council of America, an industry trade group, about 78% of 401(k) plans include some kind of employer match for employee contributions.

Employer matches vary from company to company. The general contribution from an employer is usually 3% to 6% of an employee's pay.

A Roth retirement account allows employees to contribute after taxes, with the benefits being withdrawn tax-free in retirement. Usually, employers will specify a vesting period, which is the minimum amount of time an employee must work to claim the employer-matched contributions.

Regardless of how or when an employee stops employment, the money that an employee invests in their 401(k) plan is retained by the employee. The contributions made by an employer may or may not be retained based on the vesting program. A vested employee is one that has worked in a company for a specified amount of time. The employer determines the length of time required to become vested; this is usually a one- to five-year span. A vested employee then becomes eligible to retain all retirement contributions made by an employer. After an employee is fully vested, the employee is eligible to retain the entire amount contributed by their employer, even if they leave the company before retirement. Under federal law, an employer can take back all or part of the matching money they put into an employee's account if the worker fails to stay on the job for the vesting period.

The Revenue Act of 1978 included a provision that became Internal Revenue Code. Under this act, the employees are not taxed on the portion of income they agree to receive as deferred compensation rather than direct cash payment.

Nearly two-thirds of plans provide employer matching contributions today. The employer matching program is any potential additional payment to an employee's 401(k) plan. Since the start of the credit crisis and the Great Recession, companies are either stopping matching programs or making the match available to employees based on whether or not the company makes money.

== Cons of 401(k) plan ==
- The lack of diversity in investment choices offered by many 401(k) providers
- lack of security of employee contributions
- high expenses due to the expenses built into a 401(k) plan

These are all concerning issues in a 401(k) plan. Lawmakers failed to structure laws around financial institutions that support them, so that the 401(k) is a secure retirement.

== Pros of 401(k) plan and employer matching program ==
The employer matching program and the tax deduction are great advantages to a 401(k) plan; these two alone keep many employees invested. Economically 401(k) plans are good because it incentivizes Americans to invest in anything they want and build their wealth with certain tax breaks.

For the year 2022 for 401(k) plans the contribution limit is $20,500. If an employee reached the age of 50 by the end of the calendar year, they could save an additional $6,500, for a total savings of $27,000.
