= Street collection =

Street collection can refer to:

- Street fundraising
- Waste collection, of waste put in bags or bins in the street
