= Money bomb (disambiguation) =

Moneybomb is a political fundraiser.

Money bomb or money bombing may also refer to:

- Money bombing, a synonym of commercial googlebombing
- The Money Bomb, 1983 book by James Gibb Stuart
- "A Money Bomb", the 1941 serial film (chapter 12 of The Spider Returns)
