= North London Mill =

Gold mill in Colorado, United States

Coordinates: 39.2946°N 106.1528°W

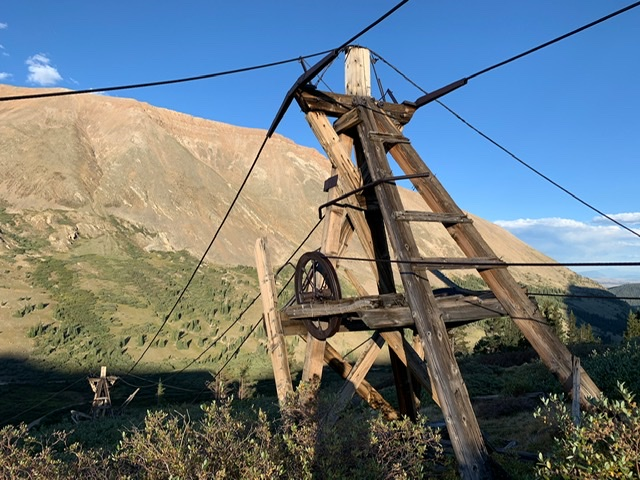
Towers of one of Colorado's first aerial tramways, carrying ore from North London Mine to the mill.

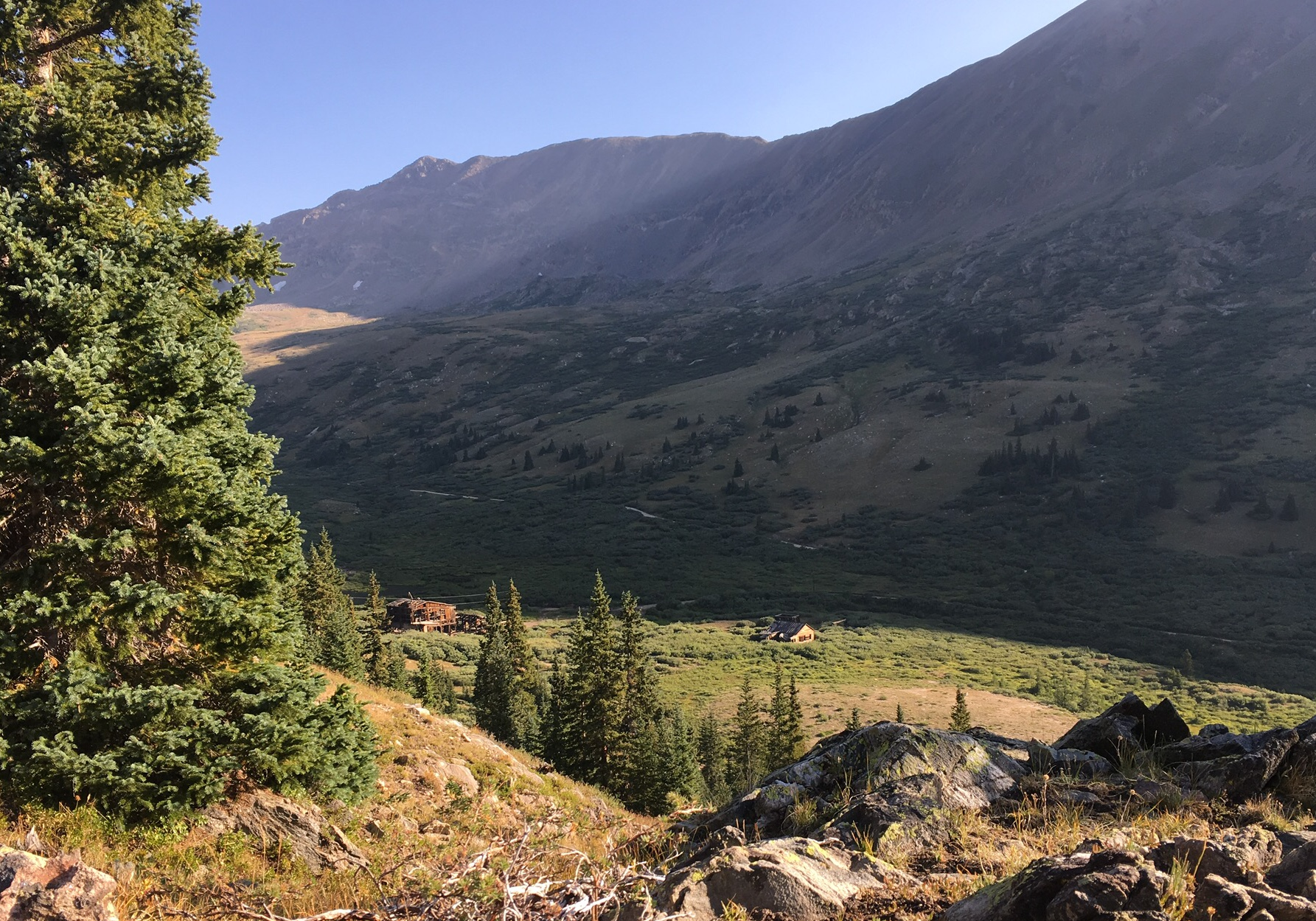
The North London Mill, Mosquito Creek

The North London Mill is a gold mill in Park County, Colorado that commenced operations in 1883. In 1874, the first London mine was opened, named for the mountain it burrowed into. The London mines became some of the most productive mines of gold, silver and lead in the area. The North London Mine in the Alma district, Park County, Colorado was in operation in 1874 and was owned by the London Mining Company. Tenants Stamp Mill was built at London Junction around 1877 to process the ore from the Mine. A second stamp mill was constructed at London Junction in 1883, and during the first seven months of operation it produced $124,000 in gold bullion and 240 tons of concentrates, which were shipped to area smelters. The South London Mine, which was opened in 1892, then became the chief producer and during the late 1890s a tunnel was bored to connect the two mines. Between 1895 and 1931 the London Mining Company's gross profits were over $9,000,000. The South London's machinery was sold and it closed in 1944. During World War II, the federal government closed all of Colorado’s gold mines under decree Order L-208, issued by the U.S. War Production Board on October 8, 1942. Gold mining was deemed non-essential to the war as gold wasn’t a strategic metal for military manufacturing. This freed up thousands of skilled miners to work in critical copper and other base metal mines. The closure order was lifted in 1945, but many gold mines never reopened. This was unique in U.S. history as gold mining was the only mining sector ordered completely shut down during the war.

Due to the rugged environment and high altitude, transportation of ore between the mines and mill was difficult and costly. Thus, the first rope cable-way in Colorado was built to carry ore down the thousand-vertical-foot slope from the mine to the mill. The mine was owned by William K. Jewett of New York and Colorado Springs.

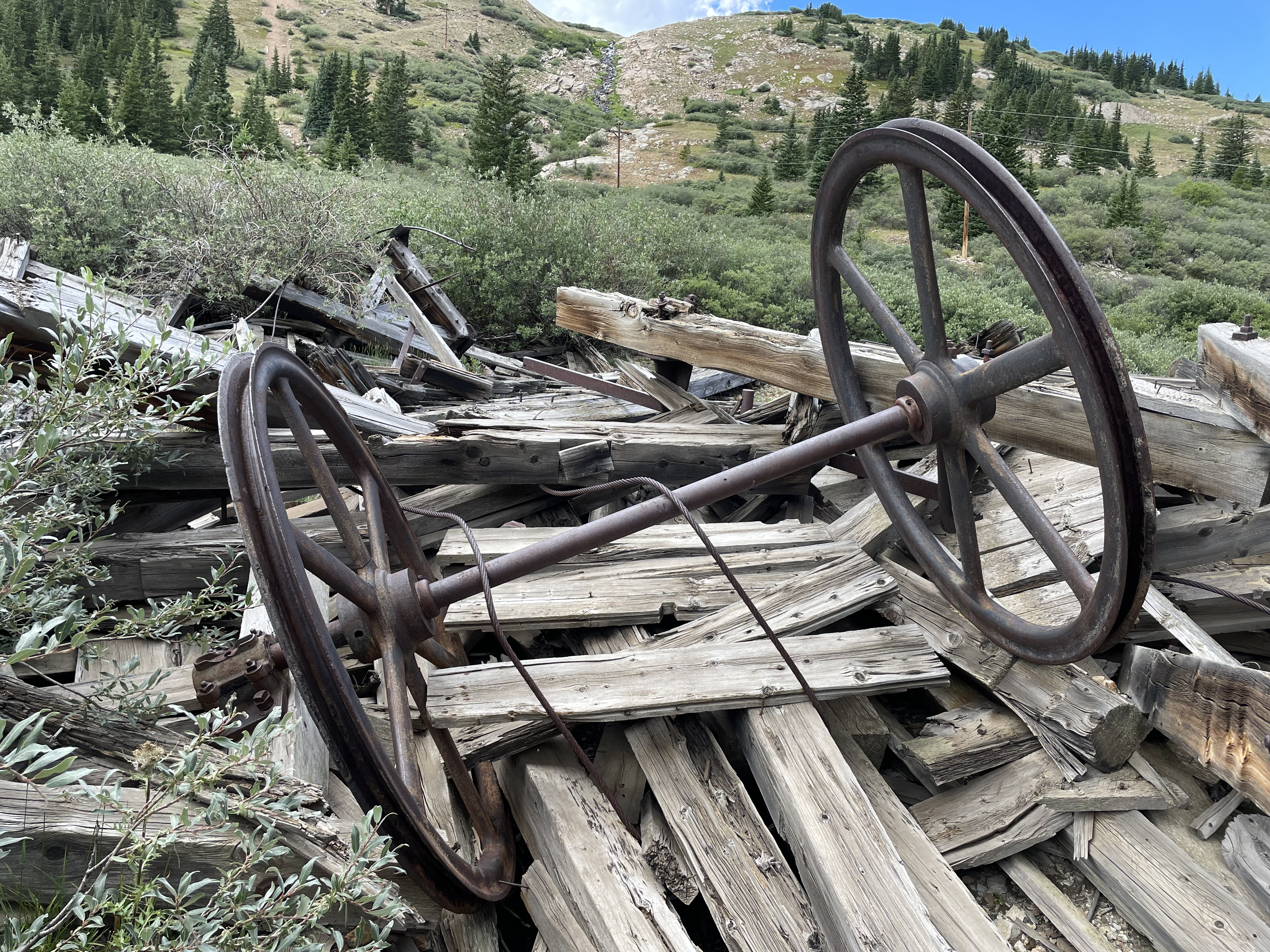
Tram Pulleys North London Mill

The North London Mill site is at 11,400 feet above sea level, West of Park City on County Road 12 (Mosquito Pass Road) outside of Alma in Park County, and has been recognized by the Park County Historic Preservation Advisory Committee as a local landmark. Mosquito Pass, at an elevation of 13,185 feet, is crossed by the highest through road in North America, and its access roads are rich in mining heritage. Constructed in the late 1870s, following the route of Father John Dyer, an itinerant preacher who carried the U.S. Mail over the pass on skis, the Mosquito Pass Road was used despite its treacherous terrain because it is the shortest route between Fairplay and Leadville. It is the lowest-elevation pass over the highest ridge in the United States (outside Alaska) and the Rocky Mountain Range. The meadows have particular fauna and flora such as Mosquito Range mustard, also known as Penland alpine fen mustard, not found elsewhere in the lower 48 states.

== Restoration efforts ==
A nonprofit organization, North London Mill Preservation Inc. (NoLo) was formed in 2017 by Executive Co-Directors Jeff Crane and Kate McCoy with a mission "to plan, finance preserve, and manage the historic buildings of the North London Mill site outside Alma, Colorado, rehabilitating them for backcountry recreation, education, the arts and sciences, and to support historic preservation throughout the State". Central to this vision is the rehabilitation of the original 1883 Mining Office building in accordance with the Secretary of the Interior's Standards for Historic Preservation, transforming it into a backcountry hut with accommodations similar to those of the 10th Mountain Division Hut system.

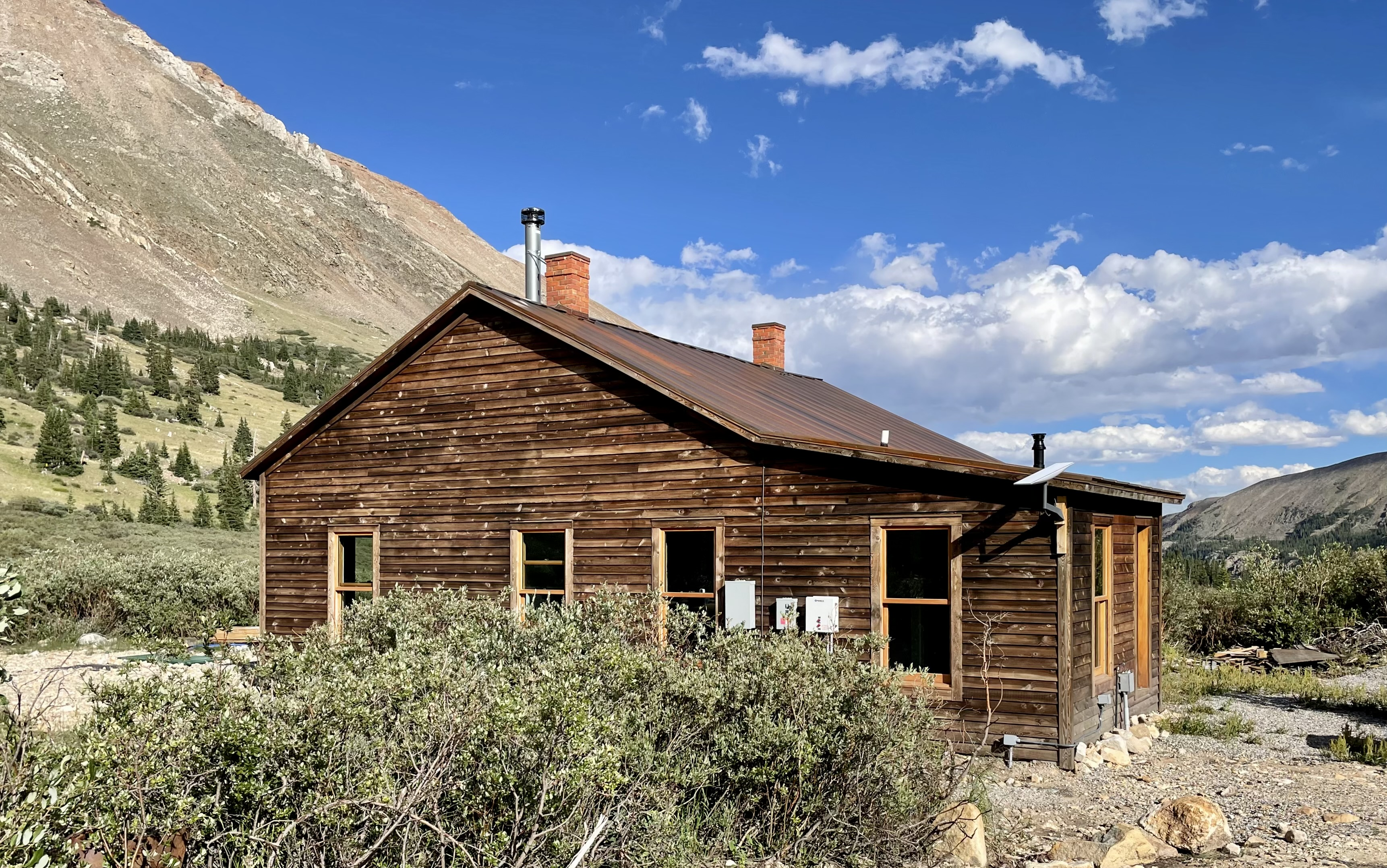
North London Mill Office

In 2019, NoLo received a grant of $154,000 from History Colorado State Historical Fund, and $48,000 in matching funds from the Gates Family Foundation, to complete exterior rehabilitation of the North London Office and prepare construction documents for the North London Mill. The preservation architects of Form+Works design group developed the preliminary drawings.

These efforts are part of an overall vision for the site as Gesamtkunstwerk, where outdoor recreation, the arts and sciences, material culture, and history are united in a high-alpine environment. In the October 2025 Colorado Academy News Crane was quoted as saying “For me, the Mill is sculpture. Technically, I suppose, it’s industrial architecture, but in a state of ruin, it’s experienced as art—just as the ruins of the ancient world were destinations for 19th century Romantic artists.”

The 1883 NoLo Mining Office received certificate of occupancy in November, 2023, and has since been open to the public for overnight accommodation. The cabin is a popular destination for backcountry skiers in winter.

In March 2026, NoLo purchased the 4 acre parcel beneath the Office and other extant buildings from MineWaterFinance, LLC, who has been working to clean up the water flowing though the mine tunnels. Minewater LLC has developed a combined regulatory and technical strategy that may provide a template for reclamation of other historic abandoned mines throughout the West.
