= Grassroots fundraising =

Mobilising local communities for fundraising

In politics, grassroots fundraising is a fundraising method that involves mobilizing local communities to support a specific fundraising goal or campaign. It has been utilized by American presidential candidates like Howard Dean, Barack Obama, Ron Paul, and Bernie Sanders.

== Practice ==
Grassroots fundraising may include canvassing. Grassroots fundraisers may use demographic data to decide who will receive which campaign messages. Grassroots fundraisers may use social media for their campaigns. Grassroots fundraising campaigns may also use peer networks, including email and social media communication.

== Applications ==
=== Canada ===
==== 2003 reforms ====
In 2003, Prime Minister Jean Chrétien introduced Bill C-24, titled "An Act to Amend the Canada Elections Act and the Income Tax Act (political financing)". Bill C-24 drastically changed how and from whom political parties could collect donations. Bill C-24 prevents federal political parties from receiving contributions from corporations and labor unions, limits contributions made by corporations and labor unions to candidates and local electorate district associations to $1,000 per year, and limits individual donor contributions to $5,000.

Because of the 2003 reforms, political fundraising shifted to grassroots fundraising. In the subsequent years, the Conservative Party of Canada (CPC) raised more money in individual donations, on average, than any other federal political party combined. This is attributed to the fact that the CPC was created in 2003 by the merger of the Canadian Alliance and the Progressive Conservative Party of Canada. The parties favored populism, which deterred corporate donors and attracted individual donors. Before the two conservative parties merged, both relied on grassroots fundraising.

==== Permanent campaign ====
In a permanent campaign, a political party continues to advertise and fundraise outside of an election period. The permanent campaign has its roots in the commonality of minority governments from 2004 and onward. The reason is that minority governments were at risk of being defeated in the house more regularly than in a majority government. Therefore, they always had to be ready for an election, hence the permanent campaign. The permanent campaign includes consistent advertising and outreach to donors. It also involves having a permanent campaign manager, rather than hiring one a year before an election. The permanent campaign mixed with the 2003 Chrétien reforms created an environment in which grassroots fundraising could take over and thrive.

=== United States ===
In the 2000 presidential election, 66.1% of campaign contributions of $200 or less came from American households earning less than $100,000, who make 86.6% of the general population, but only 14.3% of the contributions over $200 come from these households.

==== 2004 Democratic presidential primaries ====
In 2004, presidential candidate Howard Dean built his campaign around grassroots fundraising. In an interview, Dean described a $2,000-per-plate fundraising lunch organized by Vice President Dick Cheney for George W. Bush's re-election. In response, Dean challenged his supporters to come to their computers with him "for lunch". Dean was able to match the amount raised by Cheney's fundraiser.

==== 2008 presidential primaries ====
Barack Obama's presidential campaign received the most grassroots fundraising of presidential candidates in the first quarter (Q1) of 2007 based on contributions under $200 with $5.77 million, more than double the nearest candidate, John McCain, who got $2.54 million. Of Obama's Q1 2007 fundraising, 22% came from contributions under $200, while 19% of McCain's did. Republican candidates "outside of the top tier" received much larger portions of their funds in contributions under $200.

In the 2008 Republican primaries, Ron Paul's presidential campaign used the Internet to organize grassroots fundraising efforts, and inspired independent grassroots fundraising events. The most notable of these was the November 5, 2007 "moneybomb", which spread virally through forums like YouTube and Myspace. It earned the campaign $4.2 million in one day, breaking the online fundraising record as well as raising more than any other Republican candidate in the election. Ed Rollins, the manager of Ross Perot's 1992 presidential campaign, said of Paul's grassroots support, "I've been in politics for 40 years, and these days everything I've learned about politics is totally irrelevant because there's this uncontrollable thing like the Internet. Washington insiders don't know what to make of it."

== Nonprofit organizations ==
Nonprofit organizations can also utilize grassroots fundraising. Nonprofit organizations may mix advocacy and grassroots fundraising. For example, the International Rescue Committee ran a grassroots fundraising campaign in response to U.S. president Donald Trump's travel ban.

== See also ==
- Political finance
