= Key employee =

Key employee, in U.S. Internal Revenue Service (IRS) terminology, is an employee classification used when determining if company-sponsored qualified retirement plans, including 401(a) defined benefit plans and 401(k)s, are considered "top-heavy" or, in other words, weighted towards the company's more highly compensated individuals.

A key employee is defined by the IRS as an employee, either living or dead, who meets one of the following three criteria:

- An officer making over $175,000 in 2018 or $180,000 in 2019 (the income threshold is indexed by the IRS and may increase each year);
- A 5% owner of the business (defined as one who either owns more than 5% of the business, or is credited with more than 5% ownership of the business through Family-Attribution Rules), or
- An employee owning more than 1% of the business and making over $150,000 for the plan year.

All other employees are referred to as non-key employees.

There are some similarities between key employees and so-called highly compensated employees (HCE), but the compensation salary threshold is lower for HCEs, at only $120,000 versus $150,000 for key employees.

== See also ==
- Key person insurance
