= Prospect research =

Research technique in fundraising

Prospect research, also known as development research or fundraising research, is a technique through which fundraisers, development teams, and nonprofits gather relevant information about potential donors. Research methods include prospect screening companies, prospect research consultants, and in-house researchers.

Prospect researchers are professionals who work for universities, hospitals, charities or other not for profit organizations. Some are freelancers, or work for private companies. Organizations generally employ prospect researchers to find and qualify potential "major" donors who have the resources to make a large gift to the organization, although the definition of a "large" gift can vary considerably. A prospect researcher will assess an individual's, company's or charitable trust or foundation's capacity and propensity to donate. Prospect researchers use a variety of resources, including public records, business and financial publications, specialized fundraising software, and internet databases. Hospitals may incorporate prospect research into their grateful patient fundraising programs.

Prospect researchers also focus their search on individuals, companies and foundations on their specific giving interests and philanthropic histories, should they already exist.

Most prospect researchers adhere to a code of ethics to protect both the institutions they represent and the prospects they research.

Prospect research is an established component of the Prospect Development field pioneered by Bobbie J. Strand, which also encompasses relationship/pipeline management and data analytics for advancement.

== Methods ==
Prospect researchers conduct research to evaluate a prospect's ability to give, also called capacity (how prospect can financially contribute to your organization), their warmth toward the organization, also called affinity (how close the prospect feels to the organization), and propensity (how likely the individual is to give at all). Prospect researchers may also analyze data in a donor or constituent database to identify new potential major donors or to predict which groups of constituents are most likely to make major gifts.

Wealth ratings usually refer to a prospect's capacity to donate. One of the most common sources used by prospect researchers for this task are Rich Lists. The Sunday Times Rich List is widely referred to by prospect researchers, but its overall value is disputed. There is a large variety of algorithms that many scholars use to create a wealth score; most would agree in America real estate is the main indicator.

Research is generally conducted via the Internet, but it is also done with the use of AI platforms like Xapien, and subscribed databases like Factiva, LexisNexis and FAME. In America, the SEC's EDGAR database is accessed by prospect researchers as they build a profile, alongside business information websites like Crunchbase. A researcher may also use government-managed resources such as Companies House, the Charity Commission, or HM Land Registry. Other useful resources include Debrett's and Who's Who, which can provide good general background on any prospect. Social media is a common source for information on prospects. Professional networking platforms like LinkedIn may list educational history, board involvement, volunteering, and personal interests that may be considered useful context when a researcher is making recommendations to front-line fundraisers.

== Professional Organizations ==
- Association of Fundraising Professionals (AFP)
- Apra, formerly APRA (“American Prospect Research Association” became the “Association of Professional Researchers for Advancement" and no is no longer used explicitly as an acronym)
- Council for Advancement and Support of Education (CASE)
