= James Gibb Stuart =

Scottish author and publisher

James Gibb Stuart (30 August 1920 – 23 September 2013) was a financial author, owner of Ossian Publishers, and chairman of the Scottish Pure Water Association. He was known for his outspoken opposition to the European Union, and for publishing a book on monetary reform, The Money Bomb, in which he advocates a complete overhaul of British currency, the pound sterling.

== The Money Bomb ==
When The Money Bomb was published in 1983, well-documented efforts to quash any publicity clashed with advocacy of its arguments by the Margaret Thatcher government, who were struggling to freeze that country's national debt at twelve billion pounds .

== Publications ==
(Incomplete)

- The Mind Benders - Gradual Revolution and Scottish Independence, Glasgow, 1978, ISBN 0-85335-232-1
- The Lemming Folk, Glasgow, 1980, ISBN 0-85335-237-2
- The Money Bomb, Glasgow, 1983, ISBN 0-85335-256-9 or (P/B) ISBN 0-85335-257-7
- Scotland And Its Money, Edinburgh, July 1991, ISBN 0-907251-01-3
- Fantopia, Glasgow, 2000, ISBN 0-947621-13-X
