= Moneybomb =

Political fundraising technique

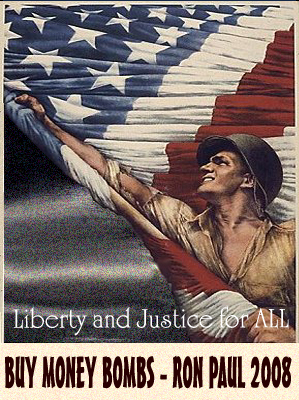
Moneybomb advertising often makes use of inverted political messages, as in the case of ads for Ron Paul (pictured).

Moneybomb (alternatively money bomb, money-bomb, or fundraising bomb) is a neologism coined in 2007 to describe a grassroots fundraising effort over a brief fixed time period, usually to support a candidate for election by dramatically increasing, concentrating, and publicizing fundraising activity during a specific hour or day. The term was coined by Trevor Lyman to describe a massive coordinated online donation drive on behalf of presidential candidate Ron Paul, in which context the San Jose Mercury News described a moneybomb as being "a one-day fundraising frenzy". The effort combines traditional and Internet-based fundraising appeals focusing especially on viral advertising through online vehicles such as YouTube, Twitter, and online forums. In the case of lesser-known candidates it is also intended to generate significant free mass media coverage the candidate would otherwise not receive. Moneybombs have been used for grassroots fundraising and viral activism over the Internet by several 2008 presidential candidates in the United States. It emerged as an important grassroots tool leading up to the 2010 midterm elections and 2012 presidential election in the United States.

== History ==
=== Origin ===
The phrase "money bomb" has had other usages in the past, but the coinage of "moneybomb" or "money bomb" to describe a coordinated mass donation drive for a political candidate came to prominence in 2007, during the campaign of American presidential candidate Ron Paul with the help of his technology team, Terra Eclipse. His supporters had earlier initiated multiple grassroots fundraising drives; New York City musician Jesse Elder is said to have coined the usage of "moneybomb" for such an event, and active-duty service member Eric Nordstrom registered the dotcom domain on October 16 and designed the first moneybomb site. A large moneybomb involving over 35,000 donors was created and proposed by James Sugra on October 14 through a YouTube video and organized by Trevor Lyman took place on November 5, 2007, Guy Fawkes Day. The fundraising drive raised over $4.2 million in one day, making it at that time the largest one-day Internet political fundraiser ever, and was backed largely by new or disaffected voters. After this, news media such as CNN began widely reporting the term "money bomb" to refer to the event. The term has also been used as a verb and apparently arose from analogy with the neologism "googlebomb".

=== Expansion ===
Multiple other similar events were scheduled for several of the 2008 presidential candidates, generally in coordination with a historical date. Imagery in the November 5 fundraiser drew on the history of the revolutionary Guy Fawkes, the film V for Vendetta, and the traditional rhyme celebrating Fawkes's plot being foiled. Unofficial drives in support of Fred Thompson, Barack Obama, Mike Huckabee, John McCain, and Dennis Kucinich were referred to by the media as moneybombs and seen as attempts to replicate the November 5 event.

Thompson's campaign disavowed his supporters' effort, which was speculated to have failed because it had been scheduled for the day before Thanksgiving and due to lack of realtime donation tracking feedback. Neither the campaign nor the site released contemporaneous fundraising results after the fundraiser. Kucinich's supporters organized a drive on December 15, in honor of the Bill of Rights adoption. Murray Sabrin, New Jersey candidate for U.S. Senate, also repeatedly brought the moneybomb concept to his own race, as well as Jim Forsythe, candidate for New Hampshire's 1st congressional district.

No fundraising drives for any campaign matched the success of the Fawkes bomb until December 16, when the moneybomb on the Boston Tea Party's anniversary, organized entirely by online volunteers, raised an amount estimated as $6.0–$6.6 million ($6 million in approved credit card receipts), from 58,407 individual contributors to Paul's campaign. This broke the November 5 record, as well as the 2004 one-day political fundraising record of John Kerry, indicating it was the largest single-day fundraiser of any kind in U.S. presidential campaign history. Professor Anthony J. Corrado, a campaign finance expert, found the event "extraordinary ... What [Paul] has done is establish himself as a major candidate, and he's no longer a fringe voice."

On February 10, 2016 the Bernie Sanders campaign had raised $6.4 to $6.5 million in the previous 24 hours. At an average of $34/contributor there were about 190,000 donors. In one 15 minute period the campaign processed 26,000 donations.

The first political money bomb in Canada was organized by Dr. Ryan Meili during his 2009 campaign for the leadership of the Saskatchewan NDP Party. Meili set a goal of raising $10,000 and ended up raising over $12,000 in the week leading up to the leadership convention. Meili asked for donations in multiples of 34—$3.40, $34, $340—to reflect his age at the time he was seeking the leadership of the party. After winning the 2012 South Carolina Republican primary Newt Gingrich organized a two-day moneybomb asking supporters to fund a "knockout punch" going into Florida.

=== Use outside politics ===
American far-right figure Alex Jones has used the term "money bomb" for telethons urging listeners to donate money to his Infowars radio show. These events resembled US public radio fundraisers although Infowars has always been a for-profit institution. According to former Infowars employees, a money bomb could raise $100,000 in a day.

== Effectiveness ==
Political consultant Ed Rollins said of the moneybomb concept, "I'll tell you, I've been in politics for 40 years, and these days everything I've learned about politics is totally irrelevant because there's this uncontrollable thing like the Internet. Washington insiders don't know what to make of it."

A 2006 Federal Election Commission ruling, exempting most Internet activity from campaign finance rules, created the loophole for moneybombs, according to Paul Ryan, a lawyer at the nonprofit Campaign Legal Center: "It's difficult to imagine any threat of corruption posed by an activist sitting at home trying to talk people into making small donations directly to a candidate's campaign.... These small donors are a good thing for the system.... This is the classic example of the modern soapbox."

Sonia Arrison of TechNewsWorld considered the transparency in pledge and donation amounts to be an important open-source element of moneybomb success: "Those revelations stand in direct contrast to traditional campaigns, which tend to be silent and proprietary about who is donating."

Campaign finance analyst Leslie Wayne regarded the YouTube and viral campaigning associated with moneybombs as an unexpected new trend in campaign finance. Wayne found the November 5 event a remarkable success because "the Paul campaign never even asked donors for the money. A grassroots group of Paul supporters, via the Internet, all decided to have a one-day online fund-raiser for Dr. Paul." RealClearPolitics considered Paul's two largest moneybombs to be one of the five moments that changed the 2007 GOP race, and the "incredibly successful" November 5 moneybomb was awarded a Golden Dot as "Technology Impact Moment of the Year" at the 2008 Politics Online Conference.

The link between moneybombs and polling results is unclear.

== Single-day fundraising comparisons ==
In 2000, after defeating George W. Bush in the New Hampshire Republican primary, John McCain raised $1 million online in 24 hours.

When John Kerry accepted the Democratic nomination in 2004, he raised $5.7 million in one day, partially over the Internet.

On January 8, 2007, a one-day call center organized by Mitt Romney raised $3,143,404 in donations ($6.5 million including both donations and pledges).

An anonymous Republican fundraising strategist found a close comparison between moneybombs and smaller Daily Kos fundraising pushes, and looked forward the possibility of "efforts to replicate this performance".

In November 2007, The New York Times and the Associated Press stated that the one-day fundraising record among 2008 presidential candidates was held by Hillary Clinton for raising $6.2 million on June 30, 2007. Other sources awarded Paul the one-day record for the December 16 event, while the Times and AP did not mention Clinton's total in their December coverage.

On December 15, 2007, Dennis Kucinich raised $131,400 from approximately 1,600 donors.

On February 5–6, 2008, in the aftermath of the Super Tuesday primaries, Barack Obama raised at least $3 million from 7 p.m. to 7 p.m. EST. On September 3–4, 2008, the night after Sarah Palin gave her speech at the Republican National Convention, Barack Obama raised $10 million from over 130,000 donors.

On November 2, 2009, Congressman Alan Grayson (D-Orlando) raised nearly $570,000 in a one-day moneybomb for his re-election campaign.

On January 11, 2010, the Republican candidate for the United States Senate seat in Massachusetts, Scott Brown, used this method of fundraising to raise well over one million dollars for his campaign.

On October 19, 2011, Ron Paul campaigners conducted a major online fundraiser to counteract what they saw as a blackout of Ron Paul by the mainstream media.

On February 9–10, 2016, Bernie Sanders raised $6.4 million after winning the New Hampshire Primary. This came after raising $3 million after a close loss in the Iowa caucus on February 1.

On September 26–27, 2016, Donald Trump raised $18 million after the first presidential debate of 2016. His campaign pulled in $18 million in online donations in the 24 hours after the first debate with Hillary Clinton.

On February 19–20, 2019, Bernie Sanders raised $5.9 million from 223,000 donors after announcing his campaign for the 2020 Democratic presidential nomination.

In the 24 hours after the 2024 State of the Union Address, which occurred on March 7, Joe Biden's re-election campaign raised $10 million. In a fundraiser at Radio City Music Hall on March 28, Biden raised $25 million.
