= Friendraising =

Friendraising is a form of fundraising that involves befriending an organization or individual for the purpose of supporting the financial aspect of a charity, nonprofit group or other community benefit organization.

== Concept ==
Relationship fundraising, which is characterized as a fundraising approach that focuses on the development of a "unique and special relationship […] between a charity and its supporter" was first discussed in 1992 by Ken Burnett, who proposed that charitable institutions move towards dealing with donors as individuals, looking at their unique donation histories and motivations.

The concept of friendraising involves a single organization or individual following a setup of guidelines and principles to establish a meaningful genuine and quality relationship with another person within the community, a business or organization. As a concept, the friendships that are established are purely authentic, regardless of financial prospects. The purpose of the relationship is to add value to the organization. As such, the relationship is meant to be endurable and supportive of itself, other organizations, and the community it serves.

== Practice ==
Some ideals friendraising may uphold for optimal success involve polite persistence, passion, and a plan.

== Controversy ==
Controversy stems from incidents where the organization exercises undue influence over a vulnerable person with the aim of benefitting from that person's estate after their death. Controversial friendraising practices include driving potential donors around (to doctor's appointments and the like), collecting prescriptions, providing referrals to lawyers for the drafting of wills, repeated and frequent home visits and other activities that involve befriending the person and enmeshing the organization's representatives in the donor's personal life.

Over the last 10 years, the term 'friendraising' has been linked to more positive fundraising terms like 'peer-to-peer' fundraising, where fundraisers reach out to their peer network for donations when they are doing a walk, run, a-thon or any of a number of participant-based fundraising activities. Friendraising is now regularly used when describing how fundraisers get their friends to help raise funds for a worthy cause, similar to peer-to-peer.
