= Volunteer grant =

Volunteer grants are charitable gifts given to non-profit organizations by corporations in recognition of volunteer work being done by a company's employees. This practice is widespread in the United States.

Corporate giving programs created to encourage volunteerism by a corporation's employees by providing volunteer grants are called volunteer grant programs or Dollars for Doers programs.

== Types ==
Two main types of corporate volunteer grants are:

1. Individual volunteer grants – These are small grants of around $250–$750 which are given to nonprofits to recognize an employee's volunteer commitment upon reaching a certain number of volunteer hours in a year (usually 10–50 hours). For example, the Sara Lee company will donate $10 to a nonprofit per every hour volunteered by an employee (minimum 20 hours, max 50 hours). Per employee, there is usually a minimum number of hours, a maximum number of grants and a cap on the total amount that can be awarded.

2. Team volunteer grants - These are grants of around $500–$1000 which are given to nonprofits to recognize a group of employees who collectively volunteer with an organization. For example, when a minimum of five Kohls associates from one location volunteer for three consecutive hours, the nonprofit earns a $500 grant.

Less common corporate volunteer grants include:

1. Annual awards for a company's top volunteer(s) — These can range anywhere from $1,000-$10,000 and are designed to recognize employees who go above and beyond the traditional volunteer expectations.
2. Corporate grants for employees to take time off from work while receiving their full benefit package to volunteer full-time with a nonprofit for a certain period of time.

Philanthropic organizations offer grants for individuals to volunteer with nonprofit organizations for an extended period of time. These are sometimes called volunteer grants but are normally referred to as fellowships. In these cases, a volunteer receives a stipend from a nonprofit to live and work within a community in need.

Companies typically state that any 501(c)(3) nonprofit or school is eligible for their corporate volunteer grant scheme; most however require a minimum number of hours served.

== Corporate Volunteer Grant procedures ==
Requesting volunteer grants is normally the volunteer's responsibility. The process varies by company program, but frequently consists of four main components:

1. Log hours - Normally this time logging is done through an online system on the company's intranet.

2. Submission - Upon reaching the required threshold for volunteer hours, the employee completes the volunteer grant request. This normally consists of completing an online or paper form that includes specific information about the nonprofit (ex. name, contact information, nonprofit tax ID, etc.)

3. Notification - The corporation notifies the nonprofit they are the recipient of a volunteer grant pending approval.

4. Validation - The nonprofit completes the process by submitting verification that they are still a qualified 501(c)(3) organization and the employee is actually a volunteer with the organization.

== Prevalence ==
In 2010, corporations donated $15 billion to nonprofit organizations, which represents a 22% increase over 2008 corporate giving levels. Approximately 40% of Fortune 500 companies offer volunteer grant programs

Many corporations contract out their volunteer grant program administration. Benevity, CyberGrants, and Volunteer Match are three of the largest vendors for contracting out corporate matching gift and volunteer grant programs.

== Other countries ==
In the US, a taxpayer cannot deduct the value of time spent on volunteer work from taxes, not even when they do so for a qualified organization. Conversely, a volunteer grant program affords a benefit to the non-profit organization and thereby a non-monetary incentive for the volunteer. The tax situation can differ between countries and is one of the factors that influence the presence or absence of volunteer grants in a country.

In the UK, an employer who lets an employee work for charity for a given amount of time can claim tax relief with regard to the wages paid for this time span.

In Germany, the volunteers may receive a tax benefit for donating time (Zeitspende): in certain conditions, a small monetary amount (Aufwandsentschädigung) per hour spent in volunteer work can be deducted from the volunteer's overall taxable income. On the other hand, some companies invest in a form of corporate volunteering in which employees participate in specified volunteering activities, for example a day of caring, on company-paid time.
