= Revenue Act of 1978 =

American tax legislation

The United States Revenue Act of 1978, Pub. L. 95–600, 92 Stat. 2763, enacted November 6, 1978, amended the Internal Revenue Code by reducing individual income taxes (widening tax brackets and reducing the number of tax rates), increasing the personal exemption from $750 to $1,000, reducing corporate tax rates (the top rate falling from 48 percent to 46 percent), increasing the standard deduction from $3,200 to $3,400 (joint returns), increasing the capital gains exclusion from 50 percent to 60 percent (effectively reducing the rate of taxation on realized capital gains to 28%), and repealing the non-business exemption for state and local gasoline taxes.

== Legislative history ==
The Act was passed by the 95th Congress and was signed into law by President Jimmy Carter on November 6, 1978.

== Provisions ==
=== Flexible spending accounts and the 401(k) section of the IRS code ===
The Act also established Flexible spending accounts, which allow employees to receive reimbursement for medical expenses from untaxed income dollars. The Act added section 401(k) to the Internal Revenue Code. This latter provision, intended to limit executive compensation, was later used to develop one of the primary tax-advantaged retirement savings vehicles in use in the United States.
