= The Money Bomb =

1983 book by James Gibb Stuart

- Author: James Gibb Stuart
- Subject: Finance
- Publication date: 1983

The Money Bomb is a book by financial author James Gibb Stuart, outlining a system of reform for the British pound that was advocated by the Margaret Thatcher administration. Stuart claims it faced controversy when book stores and periodicals were threatened with blacklisting if they carried or covered the book.
