= Matching funds =

Donation based on others' donations

Matching funds are funds that are set to be paid in proportion to funds available from other sources. Matching fund payments usually arise in situations of charity or public good. The terms cost sharing, in-kind, and matching can be used interchangeably but refer to different types of donations.

== Concept ==
In philanthropic giving, foundations and corporations often give money to non-profit entities in the form of a matching gift. Corporate matches often take the form of employee matching gifts, which means that if an employee donates to a nonprofit, the employee's corporation will donate money to the same nonprofit according to a predetermined match ratio (usually 1:1). For foundations, a matching gift is a grant made directly to a nonprofit on the condition that the nonprofit raises a set quantity of money before the grant is bestowed.

The benefit of foundation matching grants is that they provide greater incentive leverage when a nonprofit is fundraising from its constituency. If a foundation approves a 1:1 matching grant, donors know that their dollars will be doubled. On the other side, foundations who give matching grants receive assurance of the nonprofit's capacity to raise adequate funds.

Some companies facilitate the process, allowing employers to match the gifts of more than 18 million individual employees across the United States. A matching gift, typically a one-time charitable gift made by an employee and matched by the employer, should not be confused with an employer matching program, which has to do with the employee's 401(k) plan and retirement.

== History ==
Dr. Booker T. Washington, a famous African-American educator, had a long-time friendship with millionaire industrialist Henry H. Rogers, who provided him with substantial amounts of money to be applied for the betterment and education of black Americans in the late 19th and early 20th centuries.

Washington wrote that Rogers had encouraged projects with at least partial matching funds so that two ends were accomplished:

1. The gifts would help fund even greater work.
2. Recipients would have a stake in knowing that they were helping themselves by their own hard work and sacrifice.

Julius Rosenwald and the Rosenwald Fund continued and expanded the work, eventually funding over 5,000 Rosenwald Schools between 1912 and 1932. During that time, over US$4.6 million additional dollars were contributed by blacks in the communities to respond to the challenge thus presented.

In 1954, the General Electric Foundation created the Corporate Alumni Program to match donations to the colleges and universities from which its employees had graduated. This eventually broadened to other charities. The foundation is one of the most generous, with a $5,000 match per employee per year, totaling more than $18 million in 2019.

== Countries ==
=== United States ===
In 2019, corporations donated $21 billion to nonprofit organizations. This was a 13.4% increase over 2018 corporate giving levels. In 2021, over 65% of Fortune 500 companies offered an employee matching gift program with an estimated $2-3 billion donate through these programs each year.

=== Canada ===
In Canada, corporate donate an estimated $3 billion to nonprofit organizations per year through corporate sponsorships, donations, and grants. Matching funds from corporations are available to more than 480,000 individuals in Canada who work for Canada's largest companies like Royal Bank of Canada, Deluxe Canada, and Sun Life Financial.

=== United Kingdom ===
In the UK, a not-for-profit organisation, the Big Give, have used match funding to raise over £160m for thousands of different charitable projects. The match funding is provided by a network of philanthropists and funders, called 'Champions'. Research commissioned by the Big Give shows that more people give when donations are matched (84% of surveyed respondents said they would be more likely to give if donation was matched) and people give more (one in three donors said they would give more than they usually would if do).

== Government projects ==
In the United States, many projects in the various states and communities are partially funded with federal grants with a requirement for matching funds. For example, the Interstate Highway System was primarily built with a mix of 90% FHWA funds from the Highway Trust Fund and 10% matching state DOT funds. In some cases, borrowed money may be used to meet criteria for a matching grant; the $550 million Canadian federal government investment to connect a Detroit River International Crossing to Interstate 75 in Michigan qualified the state for US$2 billion in US federal matching grants that could rebuild other Michigan highways even though the Canadian money was nominally a loan, to be repaid by tolls on the new bridge.

== Government grants ==
US federal matching grants have also funded historic preservation initiatives; a local historic property may be able to seek a 1:1 federal matching grant for specific capital projects, such as restoration of structures on the National Register of Historic Places.

== Political contributions ==
=== Federal funds for presidential candidates (US) ===
In American politics, the term refers to the money a presidential candidate is given by the federal government to match the money they have raised personally. Candidates can expect up to US$250 extra from public funds for each contribution from an individual they receive.

That usually applies to the two main parties; as in order for a candidate to gain the benefits of matching funds, they must raise $5,000 from 20 states during the primaries or have received 5% of the popular vote in the general election. Pat Buchanan, running as the Reform Party candidate in 2000, received matching funds despite winning only 0.4% of the vote.

The source of the funds comes from a $3 voluntary checkoff on the US Income tax form. The program was established by the 1971 Federal Election Campaign Act. The law also "established overall spending limits for eligibility to receive matching funds, and provided for public funding of major party candidates in the general election for president".

The effect that these have on the candidates for presidential campaigns is to strengthen the role that the party plays in raising money.

Former New Mexico Governor Gary Johnson, the Libertarian Party candidate for president, qualified for federal matching funds in the 2012 US presidential election. Green Party candidate Jill Stein became the first Green Party candidate to qualify, also in the 2012 US Presidential election.

=== State funds for state and local candidates (US) ===
Prior to a 2011 Supreme Court decision, states like Arizona, Maine, New Mexico, North Carolina, and Wisconsin were using a system that distributed "additional funding to publicly financed candidates when they face big-spending opponents or opposition groups". The combined cases, Arizona Free Enterprise Fund v. Bennett (2011) and McComish v. Bennett (2011), held that "the law impermissibly forces private candidates and independent political organizations to either restrain their spending or risk triggering matching funds to their publicly financed opponents".

An alternative is a program like New York City's public financing model: public funds are used to multiply the impact of small donors. The program is administered by the New York City Campaign Finance Board, which has avoided partisan divisions. The programs work by making each contribution worth more than their current value, thereby increasing the proportional impact of the contribution. In New York City, for example, a $6-to-$1 program means that "small dollar donors constitute the vast majority of spending in New York City elections, representing 73% of all contributions in 2013 and 80% specifically to City Council race". A report by the Brennan Center found that "by pumping up the value of small contributions, the New York City system gives [candidates] an incentive to reach out to their own constituents rather than focusing all their attention on wealthy out-of-district donors, leading them to attract more diverse donors into the political process".

Programs of this type incentivize candidates to "fuse fundraising with voter outreach" and incentivize political engagement by communities that can afford only modest contributions. Candidates may then have more an incentive to reach out to their constituents rather than devoting their energy to financing their campaigns. The Election Law Journal found that matching funds through a multiplier has increased the proportional role of small donors as well as the number of small donors. The programs have also helped to shift the demographic and class profile of those who give. Finally, besides diluting the power of major givers, these programs led candidates to reach out and engage a more representative set of constituents during fundraising.

There is some dispute regarding the impact of matching funds programs like the one implemented in New York City. For example, "after implementing the public matching funds program in NYC, [the] most recent mayoral election of 2009 witnessed the lowest voter turnout it's had since the 1960s".

Others argue that the matching funds system benefits candidates with higher name recognition, especially if they are tied to a measure of popular support. Some have suggested that public funding actually has a negative effect on the perceptions the public has of the government, perhaps because public funding programs do not meet "the expectations set by reformers".

=== Private matching of contributions ===
When campaigns say they will match political contributions, it is not clear how they can legally do that, given campaign contribution limits. Matching does not show up on Federal Election Commission reports, because each individual donor is listed separately with only the total dollar amount given for the donor. Campaign finance attorneys have said there is nothing in election law that prohibits campaigns from making false claims about their matching donor schemes. Some experts have said that the claims of matching funds are outright lies. It is a "marketing gimmick", Richard Hasen, an election law professor at the University of California-Irvine, said in 2013.

== See also ==
- Corporate donations
- Payroll giving
- Volunteer grant
