= Street fundraising =

Face-to-face charity fundraising in the street or door-to-door

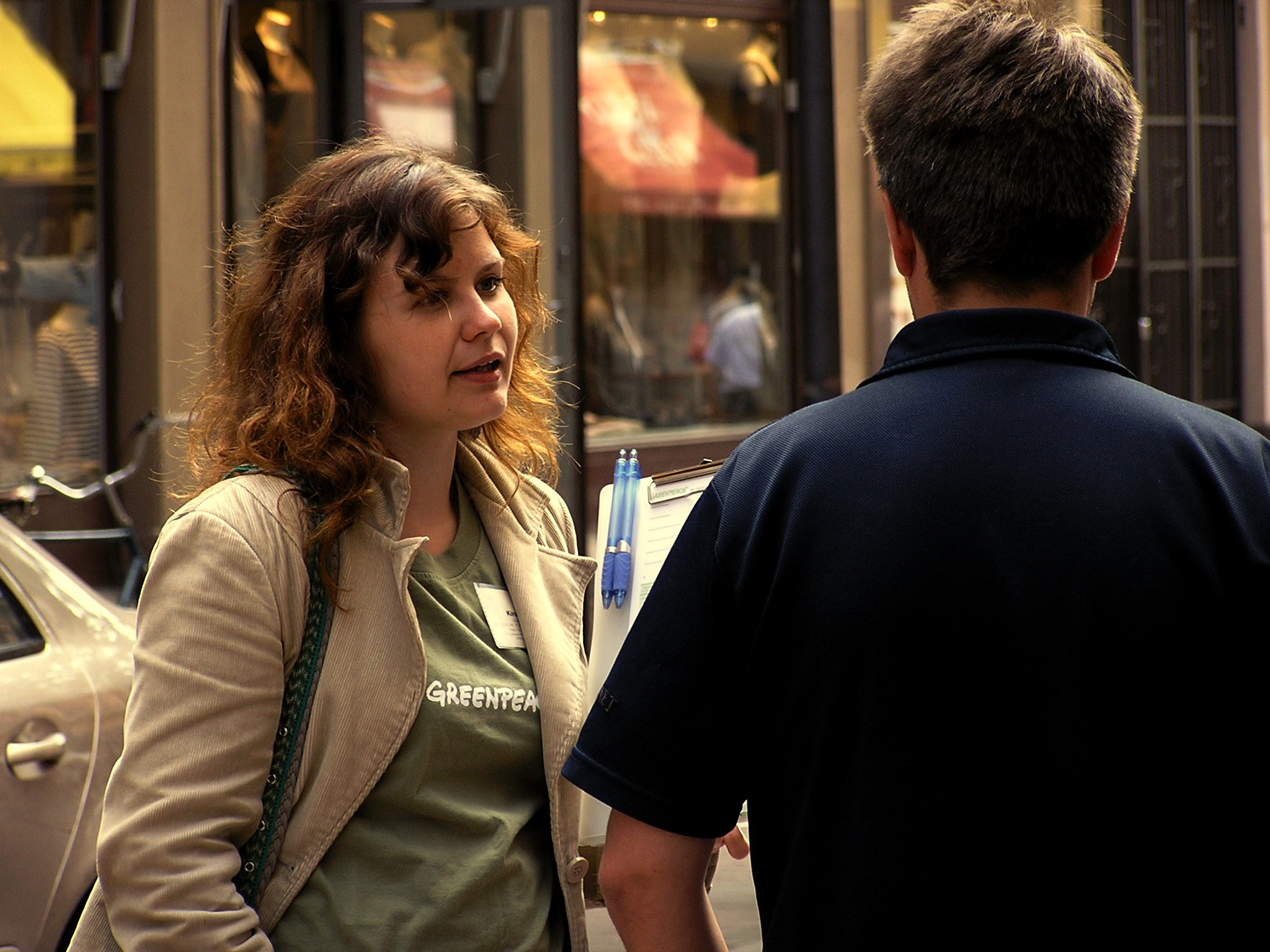
Face-to-face fundraiser talking to a passer-by in Helsinki.

Street fundraising consists of various ways of asking for donations on behalf of a charity. Those asking for donations may be paid employees of the charity (or more commonly a private contractor working on behalf of the charity), or they may be volunteers.

== Face-to-face fundraising ==
Face-to-face fundraising, which includes street and door-to-door fundraising, has in recent years become a major source of income for many charities around the world. The reason the technique is so popular is that charities usually get a very profitable return on their investment (often around 3:1) because the person is asked to donate on a regular basis. In the UK, gift aid legislation can make these donations tax efficient for both the charity and donors who pay a higher rate of income tax. By securing long term donations, charities are able to plan future campaigns in the knowledge that they have a guaranteed amount of money to work with.

Face-to-face fundraisers also serve to raise awareness of small charities and highlight the importance of new campaigns in larger, more well known organisations. The primary role of a fundraiser is to secure financial support, but charities also consider it an effective way to reach people and share important information. It is known to be particularly effective as a method of engaging young people who may not normally consider themselves interested in the charity's work.

=== UK Legislation ===
The regulations made by the Charities Act 2006 in the UK led to significant changes to face-to-face fundraising. From 1 April 2008, professional (paid) fundraisers have been required to disclose to the public that they are paid, and fundraising agencies have been required to disclose the donor recruitment costs involved in that campaign.

UK Legislation covering street face to face Charity cash collections on the street – the type usually done by volunteer "tin rattlers" – need a licence from the council (or the police in London) under the Police, Factories etc (Miscellaneous Provisions) Act of 1916. However, an issue arises when determining whether soliciting Direct Debits during face to face street fundraising is covered by this act. The act states specifically that licences are required for collections of money, whereas Direct Debits are not considered to be money in law: they are "promises of money" at a later date.

Face to face conducted door-to-door by visiting householders is covered by a completely different act, the House-to-House Collections Act 1939. Unlike 1916, this is generally held to cover face to face Direct Debit fundraising because it states that a licence is required for the collection of ‘money or other property’.

== Street fundraising ==
Paid street fundraisers stand in busy areas and approach passers-by to persuade them to donate money to the charitable cause they are promoting. They will briefly explain the work of the charity and try to engage the person in a dialogue about the issues the charity focuses on. The fundraiser will then move the conversation towards asking for a financial contribution (via Direct debit), usually a regular monthly pledge. Fundraisers either work directly for a charity as part of an in-house team, or for an agency who have been paid by a charity to represent them. In the latter case the fundraising agency is usually paid a flat fee with the aim of raising a specific, minimum amount of money in return over a specific period of time.

Street fundraisers often work in teams. They are occasionally paid through commission or performance related pay, or a combination of both. However, the vast majority work for an hourly rate. In the United Kingdom, fundraisers are legally obliged to point out to potential donors if they are paid when they speak to them. A self-regulatory body, the Chartered Institute of Fundraising, exists to ensure that this happens and that all fundraisers conduct themselves in a manner acceptable to the charity.

Often, fundraisers are discouraged from signing up people in full-time education or under the age of 21, as statistically they are more likely to cancel their direct debit than others. On average, the supporter who signs up on the street will continue giving for 3–5 years. Regular giving is understood by those working in the charity sector as the most effective form of giving, allowing for long term planning. So, a supporter giving £10 a month will, over 5 years, gives £600 to the charity, and also lead to the likelihood of the charity claiming Gift Aid, a further 25% tax relief from the government.

== Door-to-door fundraising ==
Door-to-door fundraisers call at people's homes to solicit donations for various charities. Usually this means a regular donation, but it can also be a one-off payment.

Some door-to-door fundraisers work in teams. They will come to an area only once to approach as many homes as possible. Some charities and agencies are unable to make appointments to return, which may lead to a high-pressure situation where a person may feel obliged into making a decision to support the charity. Other door-to-door fundraisers work alone. In this case they are likely to live locally and are able to make appointments to return to see a person who may be interested in supporting the charity. This gives people more time to think it over and research the charity, and they are far less likely to feel pressured.

Many organizations take varying approaches to door-to-door fundraising. There is a vast difference between charity fundraising agencies and marketing companies. Fundraising agencies usually pay a flat rate to fundraisers, whereas marketing companies often work on a purely commission basis, meaning the fundraiser is under greater pressure to complete the donation leading to higher pressure tactics to being used.

== Volunteer fundraisers ==
Charities have always relied upon individuals to help raise money for them. These people use many methods, such as collecting cash in boxes or tins, sponsored tasks, organising events and collecting from the attendees, or visiting people at their homes and asking for a donation. Volunteers may contribute just a few hours as a one-off action or work regularly for a charity for many years. There are examples of dedicated individuals raising enormous sums for their favourite charity, just in their spare time. However, by nature, this is an unreliable way for major charitable organisations to source their funds. If charities were forced to manage on spontaneous donations alone, many would have to scale down their operations considerably and some would not function at all.

== Criticism ==
Frequent complaints about paid street fundraisers include the use of aggressive or deceitful tactics, inability to accept anything but an ongoing donation and lack of knowledge of the charity. Also donors may not understand the charges that the charity has to pay. A donor who stops giving after, say, six months, may have donated less than the commission paid by the charity to the contractor. Paid street fundraisers are sometimes known as "chuggers" (a portmanteau of "charity" and "muggers") because fundraising can be viewed as aggressive or invasive. 'Chuggers' can often only accept bank details for ongoing donations and therefore turn down one-off donations if offered.

Sometimes the sheer frequency of fundraisers in a certain area will lead to frustration; a survey in London during 2009 found 500 fundraisers working on four roads over a six-week period. However, those in the charity sector see street fundraising as an invaluable method of raising brand awareness and recruiting younger donors under the age of 35 who are "like gold-dust for a charity because they will give over a longer lifetime".

Opinion polls suggest high levels of public hostility towards street fundraisers, with as many as 80 per cent of those interviewed being against them. Under UK law, street fundraising is legal as street fundraisers are not themselves soliciting cash donations, but rather Direct Debit agreements.

The fundraisers may be employed directly by the charity as part of an "in-house" team. They may also be employed by an agency working specifically in the area of fundraising. In this case, the company is usually paid a fixed fee per person signed up. This fee depends on a number of variables, such as the number of donors required and the average annual donation desired. Though charities can normally expect to generate a minimum return on their investment of 3:1 over the duration of a donor's giving relationship with them.

Street fundraising is likely to continue while it remains cost-effective. Figures state that charities gain as much as three quarters of their income from this method. However, some people find street fundraisers intimidating and may feel pressured into signing up to regular giving agreements. Signing up under pressure is against the fundraisers' guidelines and the majority of fundraisers who operate with good ethics will not sign someone up if they openly articulate their will not to sign up. In the UK some local councils have set up "cold caller exclusion zones" to prevent doorstep fundraisers.

In the Republic of Ireland the Charities Act, 2009 will require all street fundraisers to acquire a permit from a Chief Superintendent of the Garda Síochána for cash and non-cash collections alike. In the UK, councils are currently lobbying for street fundraisers to be licensed to limit their numbers.

== See also ==
- Solicitation
- Fundraising
- Crowdfunding
