= Dynamic Microsimulation Model of the Czech Republic =

The Dynamic Microsimulation Model of the Czech Republic is a dynamic microsimulation pension model simulating the pension system of the Czech Republic, owned by the Ministry of Labour and Social Affairs.

The model was developed in 2011 by Deloitte. The project was funded with support from the European Commission's Progress programme, for projects related to the development of administrative datasets and models for labour market and pension analysis.

== Details ==
The model was implemented by Deloitte (Actuarial & Insurance Solutions, Central Europe) using a software system called Prophet developed by SunGard. A special library containing the entire code was prepared by Deloitte specifically for this purpose. Deloitte had previously developed and implemented similar pension models in other countries, such as Hungary.

The Dynamic Microsimulation Model allowed the Ministry of Labour and Social Affairs to use individual data, along with aggregate results, to explore the impact on distribution of pensions, poverty of pensioners, impact of the changes of the pension formula on distributional properties of the pension system and so on.

The model is parametrised to the existing pension system. However, all the major parameters of the current system are stored in the system of tables and can be changed in order to investigate the impact of the parameter change on the pension system. The model also includes the functionality of a funded pillar and enables simulation of the impact of introduction of the funded pillar.

== See also ==
- Econometrics
