= Pension =

Retirement fund

A pension (/ˈpɛnʃən/; from Latin pensiō 'payment') is a fund or pay-as-you-go scheme into which amounts are paid regularly during an individual's working career, and from which periodic payments are made to support the person's retirement from work. A pension may be either a "defined benefit plan", where defined periodic payments are made in retirement and the contributions to the pension are adjusted to support these defined retirement payments, or a "defined contribution plan", under which defined amounts are paid in during working life, and the retirement payments are whatever can be afforded from the fund.

Pensions should not be confused with severance pay; the former is usually paid in regular amounts for life after retirement, while the latter is typically paid as a fixed amount after involuntary termination of employment before retirement.

The terms "retirement plan" and "superannuation" tend to refer to a pension granted upon retirement of the individual; the terminology varies between countries. Retirement plans may be set up by employers, insurance companies, the government, or other institutions such as employer associations or trade unions. Called retirement plans in the United States, they are commonly known as pension schemes in the United Kingdom and Ireland and superannuation plans (or super) in Australia and New Zealand.

A pension created by an employer for the benefit of an employee is commonly referred to as an occupational or employer pension. Labor unions, the government, or other organizations may also fund pensions. Occupational pensions are a form of deferred compensation, usually advantageous to employee and employer for tax reasons. Many pensions also contain an additional insurance aspect, since they often will pay benefits to survivors or disabled beneficiaries. Other vehicles (certain lottery payouts, for example, or an annuity) may provide a similar stream of payments. Individuals without access to employer-sponsored pensions sometimes use annuities to create a guaranteed income stream similar to a traditional pension.

The common use of the term pension is to describe the payments a person receives upon retirement, usually under predetermined legal or contractual terms. A recipient of a retirement pension is known as a pensioner or retiree.

== Types ==
=== Employment-based pensions ===
A retirement plan is an arrangement to provide people with an income during retirement when they are no longer earning a steady income from employment. Often retirement plans require both the employer and employee to contribute money to a fund during their employment in order to receive defined benefits upon retirement. It is a tax deferred savings vehicle that allows for the tax-free accumulation of a fund for later use as retirement income. Funding can be provided in other ways, such as from labor unions, government agencies, or self-funded schemes. Pension plans are therefore a form of "deferred compensation". A SSAS is a type of employment-based Pension in the UK. The 401(k) is the iconic self-funded retirement plan that many Americans rely on for much of their retirement income; these sometimes include money from an employer, but are usually mostly or entirely funded by the individual using an elaborate scheme where money from the employee's paycheck is withheld, at their direction, to be contributed by their employer to the employee's plan. This money can be tax-deferred or not, depending on the exact nature of the plan.

==== Military ====
Some countries also grant pensions to military veterans. Military pensions are overseen by the government; an example of a standing agency is the United States Department of Veterans Affairs. Ad hoc committees may also be formed to investigate specific tasks, such as the U.S. Commission on Veterans' Pensions (commonly known as the "Bradley Commission") in 1955–56. Pensions may extend past the death of the veteran himself, continuing to be paid to the widow.

In the U.S., retired military receive a military retirement pay, not called a "pension" as they can be recalled to active duty at any time. Military retirement pay is calculated on number of years on active duty, final pay grade and the retirement system in place when they entered service. Members awarded the Medal of Honor qualify for a separate stipend. Retirement pay for military members in the reserve and US National Guard is based on a point system.

=== State pension ===
Many countries have created schemas for their citizens and residents to provide income when they retire (or in some cases become disabled). Typically this requires payments throughout the citizen's working life in order to qualify for benefits later on. A basic state pension is a "contribution based" benefit, and depends on an individual's contribution history. For examples, see National Insurance in the UK, or Social Security in the United States of America.

=== Social pensions ===
Social pensions are intended to prevent economic deprivation at old age. Over 80 countries have social pensions. Examples of universal pensions include New Zealand Superannuation and the Basic Retirement Pension of Mauritius. Most social pensions are means tested, such as Supplemental Security Income in the United States of America or the "older person's grant" in South Africa.

=== Disability pensions ===
Some pension plans will provide for members in the event they suffer a disability. This may take the form of early entry into a retirement plan for a disabled member below the normal retirement age.

== Defined benefit plans ==
A defined benefit (DB) pension plan is a plan in which workers accrue pension rights during their time at a firm and upon retirement the firm pays them a benefit that is a function of that worker's tenure at the firm and of their earnings. In other words, a DB plan is a plan in which the benefit on retirement is determined by a set formula, rather than depending on investment returns. Traditionally, defined benefit plans for employers have been administered by institutions which exist specifically for that purpose, by large businesses, or, for government workers, by the government itself. A traditional form of defined benefit plan is the final salary plan, under which the pension paid is equal to the number of years worked, multiplied by the member's salary at retirement, multiplied by a factor known as the accrual rate. The final accrued amount is available as a monthly pension or a lump sum, but usually monthly. Government pensions can be a type of defined benefit pension plan if they are in the form of contractual obligations.

In the US, 26 U.S.C. § 414(j) specifies a defined benefit plan to be any pension plan that is not a defined contribution plan (see below) where a defined contribution plan is any plan with individual accounts. A traditional pension plan that defines a benefit for an employee upon that employee's retirement is a defined benefit plan. In the U.S., corporate defined benefit plans, along with many other types of defined benefit plans, are governed by the Employee Retirement Income Security Act of 1974 (ERISA).

In the United Kingdom, benefits are typically indexed for inflation (known as Retail Prices Index (RPI)) as required by law for registered pension plans. Inflation during an employee's retirement affects the purchasing power of the pension; the higher the inflation rate, the lower the purchasing power of a fixed annual pension. This effect can be mitigated by providing annual increases to the pension at the rate of inflation (usually capped, for instance at 5% in any given year). This method is advantageous for the employee since it stabilizes the purchasing power of pensions to some extent.

If the pension plan allows for early retirement, payments are often reduced to recognize that the retirees will receive the payouts for longer periods of time. In the United States, under the Employee Retirement Income Security Act of 1974, any reduction factor less than or equal to the actuarial early retirement reduction factor is acceptable.

Many DB plans include early retirement provisions to encourage employees to retire early, before the attainment of normal retirement age. Companies would rather hire younger employees at lower wages. Some of those provisions come in the form of additional temporary or supplemental benefits, which are payable to a certain age, usually before attaining normal retirement age.

Due to changes in pensions over the years, many pension systems, including those in Alabama, California, Indiana, and New York, have shifted to a tiered system. For a simplified example, suppose there are three employees that pay into a state pension system: Sam, Veronica, and Jessica. The state pension system has three tiers: Tier I, Tier II, and Tier III. These three tiers are based on the employee's hire date (i.e. Tier I covers 1 January 1980 (and before) to 1 January 1995, Tier II 2 January 1995 to 1 January 2010, and Tier III 1 January 2010 to present) and have different benefit provisions (e.g. Tier I employees can retire at age 50 with 80% benefits or wait until 55 with full benefits, Tier II employees can retire at age 55 with 80% benefits or wait until 60 for full benefits, Tier III employees can retire at age 65 with full benefits). Therefore, Sam, hired in June 1983, would be subject to the provisions of the Tier I scheme, whereas Veronica, hired in August 1995, would be permitted to retire at age 60 with full benefits and Jessica, hired in December 2014, would not be able to retire with full benefits until she became 65.

=== Criticisms ===
One of the growing concerns with defined benefit plans is that the level of future obligations will outpace the value of assets held by the plan (Unfunded mandate). This "underfunding" dilemma can be faced by any type of defined benefit plan, private or public, but it is most acute in governmental and other public plans where political pressures and less rigorous accounting standards can result in excessive commitments to employees and retirees, but inadequate returns. Many states and municipalities across the United States of America and Canada now face chronic pension crises.

== Defined contribution plans ==
A defined contribution (DC) plan, is a pension plan where employers set aside a certain proportion (i.e. contributions) of a worker's earnings (such as 5%) in an investment account, and the worker receives this savings and any accumulated investment earnings upon retirement. These contributions are paid into an individual account for each member. The contributions are invested, for example in financial markets, and the returns on the investment (which may be positive or negative) are credited to the individual's account. Defined contribution plans have become widespread all over the world in recent years, and are now the dominant form of plan in the private sector in many countries. For example, the number of defined benefit plans in the U.S. has been steadily declining, as more and more employers see pension contributions as a large expense avoidable by disbanding the defined benefit plan and instead offering a defined contribution plan.

Money contributed can either be from employee salary deferral or from employer contributions. The portability of defined contribution pensions is legally no different from the portability of defined benefit plans. However, because of the cost of administration and ease of determining the plan sponsor's liability for defined contribution plans (you do not need to pay an actuary to calculate the lump sum equivalent that you do for defined benefit plans) in practice, defined contribution plans have become generally portable.

In a defined contribution plan, investment risk and investment rewards are assumed by each individual/employee/retiree and not by the sponsor/employer, and these risks may be substantial. In addition, participants do not necessarily purchase annuities with their savings upon retirement, and bear the risk of outliving their assets. (In the United Kingdom, for instance, it is a legal requirement to use the bulk of the fund to purchase an annuity.)

The "cost" of a defined contribution plan is readily calculated, but the benefit from a defined contribution plan depends upon the account balance at the time an employee is looking to use the assets. So, for this arrangement, the contribution is known but the benefit is unknown (until calculated).

Despite the fact that the participant in a defined contribution plan typically has control over investment decisions, the plan sponsor retains a significant degree of fiduciary responsibility over investment of plan assets, including the selection of investment options and administrative providers.

=== Examples ===
In the United States, the legal definition of a defined contribution plan is a plan providing for an individual account for each participant, and for benefits based solely on the amount contributed to the account, plus or minus income, gains, expenses and losses allocated to the account (see 26 U.S.C. § 414(i)). Examples of defined contribution plans in the United States include individual retirement accounts (IRAs) and 401(k) plans. In such plans, the employee is responsible, to one degree or another, for selecting the types of investments toward which the funds in the retirement plan are allocated. This may range from choosing one of a small number of pre-determined mutual funds to selecting individual stocks or other financial assets. Most self-directed retirement plans are characterized by certain tax advantages, and some provide for a portion of the employee's contributions to be matched by the employer. In exchange, the funds in such plans may not be withdrawn by the investor prior to reaching a certain age—typically the year the employee reaches 59.5 years old (with a small number of exceptions)—without incurring a substantial penalty.

Advocates of defined contribution plans point out that each employee has the ability to tailor the investment portfolio to his or her individual needs and financial situation, including the choice of how much to contribute, if anything at all. However, others state that these apparent advantages could also hinder some workers who might not possess the financial savvy to choose the correct investment vehicles or have the discipline to voluntarily contribute money to retirement accounts.

In the US, defined contribution plans are subject to IRS limits on how much can be contributed, known as the section 415 limit. In 2009, the total deferral amount, including employee contribution plus employer contribution, was limited to $49,000 or 100% of compensation, whichever is less. The employee-only limit in 2009 was $16,500 with a $5,500 catch-up. These numbers usually increase each year and are indexed to compensate for the effects of inflation. For 2015, the limits were raised to $53,000 and $18,000, respectively.

Examples of defined contribution pension schemes in other countries are, the UK's personal pensions and proposed National Employment Savings Trust (NEST), Germany's Riester plans, Australia's Superannuation system and New Zealand's KiwiSaver scheme. Individual pension savings plans also exist in Austria, Czech Republic, Denmark, Greece, Finland, Ireland, Netherlands, Slovenia and Spain.

Notional defined contributions are defined contribution plans where contributions are tracked as a notional amount for each individual, for example in Italy, Latvia, Poland and Sweden.

== Risk sharing pensions ==
In collective risk sharing schemes members pool their contributions and to a greater or less extent share the investment and longevity risk. There are multiple naming conventions for these plans reflecting the fact that the future payouts are a target or ambition of the plan sponsor rather than a guarantee, common naming conventions include:

- Defined ambition plans
- Target benefit plans
- Collective defined contributions
- Tontine pensions

=== Risk sharing pension sponsor examples ===
- US: State of Wisconsin Investment Board
- US: TIAA
- UK: Royal Mail Pension Fund
- Netherlands: Stichting Pensioenfonds ABP
- Denmark: Arbejdsmarkedets Tillægspension

== Life annuity ==
On retirement, the member's account can be used to purchase an life annuity which then provides a regular pension income until death. Life annuity insures against the risk of longevity and outliving retirement savings. Due to generally longer female life expectancy women have to contribute more to pensions to reach the same pension annuities in case of identical retirement age.

== Capital-funded ==
In a capital-funded pension plan, contributions are invested in a fund towards meeting the future pension benefits. All plans must be funded in some way, so this type of plan is also known as pre-funded. The future returns on the investments, and the future benefits to be paid, are not known in advance, so there is no guarantee that a given level of contributions will be enough to meet the benefits. Typically, the contributions to be paid are regularly reviewed in a valuation of the plan's assets and liabilities, carried out by an actuary to ensure that the pension fund will meet future payment obligations. This means that in a defined benefit pension, investment risk and investment rewards are typically assumed by the sponsor/employer and not by the individual. If a plan is not well-funded, the plan sponsor may not have the financial resources to continue funding the plan.

Occupational pensions are typically provided through employment agreements between workers and employers, and their financing structure must meet legislative requirements. In common-law jurisdictions, the law requires that pensions be pre-funded in trusts, with a range of requirements to ensure the trustees act in the best interests of the beneficiaries. These jurisdictions account for over 80% of assets held by private pension plans around the world. Of the $50.7 trillion of global assets in 2019, $32.2T were in U.S. plans, the next largest being the U.K. ($3.2T), Canada ($2.8T), Australia ($1.9T), Singapore ($0.3T), Hong Kong and Ireland (each roughly $0.2T), New Zealand, India, Kenya, Nigeria, Jamaica, etc.

Civil-law jurisdictions with statutory trust vehicles for pensions include the Netherlands ($1.8T), Japan ($1.7T), Switzerland ($1.1T), Denmark ($0.8T), Sweden, Brazil and S. Korea (each $0.5T), Germany, France, Israel, P.R. China, Mexico, Italy, Chile, Belgium, Spain and Finland (each roughly $0.2T), etc. Without the vast body of common law to draw upon, statutory trusts tend to be more uniform and tightly regulated.

Canadians have the option to open a registered retirement savings plan (RRSP), as well as a range of employee and state pension programs. This plan allows contributions to this account to be marked as un-taxable income and remain un-taxed until withdrawal. Most countries' governments will provide advice on pension schemes.

Several countries have hybrid systems which are partially funded. Spain set up the Social Security Reserve Fund and France set up the Pensions Reserve Fund; in Canada the wage-based retirement plan (CPP) is partially funded, with assets managed by the CPP Investment Board while the U.S. Social Security system is partially funded by investment in special U.S. Treasury Bonds.

== Pay-as-you-go ==
In an pay-as-you-go (PAYGO) pension plan current pension benefits are paid from current pension contributions. Pension arrangements provided by the state in many countries in the world are at least partially pay-as-you-go, with benefits paid directly from current workers' contributions and taxes. Paygo pensions are viewed either as contractual obligations or unenforceable gratuity, depending on the country and case. The pay-as-you-go financing depends largely upon future legislation, future taxes, and future dependency ratios for their sustainability. Paygo pensions can be understood as a form of mandatory intra-family transfers, where working adults pay for the current pensions of their parents and grandparents generations, while the pensions of people above retirement age are paid by their child and grandchild generations. The social security systems of some countries, such as Germany, France, Italy and Spain, are mostly pay-as-you-go, having current benefits paid directly out of current taxes and social security contributions.

== Fairness ==
For pension schemes actuarial fairness describes when the present value of contributions is equal to the present value of expected pension benefits. The present value of an individuals contributions is

$$PV_\text{contributions} = \sum_{t=0}^{n} C_t \times (1 + i)^{n-t}$$

and the present value of benefits is

$$PV_\text{benefits} = \sum_{t=0}^{\infty} B_t \times {}_{t}p_{x} \times (1 + i)^{-t}$$,

where $C_t$ is the contribution and $B_t$ is the benefit at timeperiods $t$, $i$ is the interest rate, $n$ is the number of periods, ${}_{t}p_{x}$ is the probability that a person aged $x$ survives for $t$ more periods according to the life table. In case of funded pensions the present values of benefits and contribution are for the same person, while for pay-as-you-go pensions the present value of benefits are for the parent generation, while the present value of contributions is for their children's generation.

In cases where the present values of contributions and benefits differ, the pension system redistributes within a generation or between generations. Pension systems can be evaluated on a scale between no redistribution (Bismarck model) to equal pension benefits irrespective of individual contributions (Beveridge model). A German opinion poll published in 2025 showed mixed public support between no redistribution, some redistribution and adjusting benefits based on actual expected life expectancy. Caps on contributions, for example the Social Security Wage Base, are typically combined with proportional caps on benefits to maintain fairness.

Pensions can show intergenerational equity or in case of cost-shifting intergenerational selfishness. Gerontocracy can result in overspending on pensions.

Portability of pensions refers to the ability for an individual to maintain the actuarial value of their accrued pension benefits when changing jobs or countries both for the individual and the country or fund. Noncontributory pension benefits can be non-exportable.

== Unsustainable budgets ==
Another growing challenge are unsustainable and unbalanced budgets of pension schemes. Fiscal illusion and biased pension fund governance can contribute to underfunding. Underfunded pensions contribute to the government debt. For example, in 2009, the majority of US states have unfunded pension liabilities exceeding all reported state debt. Bradley Belt, former executive director of the PBGC (the Pension Benefit Guaranty Corporation, the federal agency that insures private-sector defined-benefit pension plans in the event of bankruptcy), testified before a Congressional hearing in October 2004, "I am particularly concerned with the temptation, and indeed, growing tendency, to use the pension insurance fund as a means to obtain an interest-free and risk-free loan to enable companies to restructure. Unfortunately, the current calculation appears to be that shifting pension liabilities onto other premium payers or potentially taxpayers is the path of least resistance rather than a last resort." Challenges have further been increased by the post-2007 credit crunch. Total funding of the nation's 100 largest corporate pension plans fell by $303bn in 2008, going from a $86bn surplus at the end of 2007 to a $217bn deficit at the end of 2008. The extent of underfunding tends to be uncertain due to uncertainty in predictions of the future, which can be mitigated through risk sharing. The confidence in pay-as-you-go pension sustainability tends to be lower for young adults.

=== Fertility ===
A growing challenge for pay-as-you-go pensions is the decreasing total fertility rate in many countries, which reduces future old-age dependency ratios. As birth rates in most countries drop and life expectancy increases, an ever-larger portion of the population is elderly. Emigration of working-age adults and immigration of older persons worsens the dependency ratio. This leaves fewer workers for each retired person. The uncertainty in future fertility results in uncertain pension funding forecasts. Higher old-age dependency ratio can result in a pensions crisis. In many developed countries this means that government and public sector pensions will potentially be a drag on their economies unless pension systems are reformed in advance.

=== Economic challenges ===
Low interest rates can make it more difficult for pension funds to generate returns on their investments, which can in turn lead to lower benefits for pensioners. In addition, economic downturns can lead to higher unemployment rates, which can result in lower contributions to pension plans. The share of people who don't contribute or contribute less to pensions can rise, for example in the gig economy.

=== Pension crisis ===
The pensions crisis, or pensions time bomb is the predicted difficulty in paying for corporate or government pension benefits in various countries, due to a mismatch between pension obligations and the resources set aside to fund them. The basic difficulty of the pension problem is that institutions must be sustained over far longer than the political planning horizon. Shifting demographics are causing a lower ratio of workers per retiree; contributing factors include retirees living longer (increasing the relative number of retirees), and lower birth rates (decreasing the relative number of workers, especially relative to the Post-WW2 Baby Boom). There is significant debate regarding the magnitude and importance of the problem, as well as the solutions. One aspect and challenge of the "Pension timebomb" is that several countries' governments have a constitutional obligation to provide public services to their citizens, but funding for these programs has been strained due to increasing dependency ratio, which increases costs of elderly care. In pay-as-you-go pension systems decreasing total fertility rate causes lifetime pension benefits to be smaller than lifetime contributions.

== Balancing pension funding ==
Balancing pension funding can include a decrease of real pensions, increases in pension contributions, reducing the expected years in retirement by increasing the retirement age or reforming the pension system. Low total fertility rates and high old-age dependency ratios lead to forecasts of further pension reforms. Some software allow to predict the effect of pension policies. The electoral costs of pension reforms can depend on financial literacy.

=== Balancing contributions and benefits ===
Pension funding can be balanced when individual contributions and benefits are balanced. One pension reform approach is to decrease the amount of real pensions paid to retirees, to decrease the length of pensions by increasing the retirement age closer to the life expectancy. or to increase of employee or employer pension contributions. Increased contributions decreases the employee's disposable income and the rise of the direct labor cost degrades labour demand and increases the costs of production, reducing competitivity. Information about expected individual pension benefits can increase pension contributions. Retirement age can be flexible while keeping pension funding balanced through actuarially neutral reduction of pension benefits with decreasing retirement age.

=== Decreasing sensitivity on the fertility rate ===
Another pension reform approach is changing the pension system to be intrinsically balanced regardless of the total fertility rate. One proposed pension system extends the overlapping generations model to balance the life-cycle of human capital formation through parenting and pensions. The size of pension contributions can depend on the children's pension contributions, which balance out the pension system. One example is the German long-term care insurance, where childfree adults pay higher contributions to reduce the sensitivity of funding on the fertility rate. Higher pension contributions by childless was supported by 76.7% in Germany according to an 2014 opinion poll.

== Effects ==
=== Risk and responsibility ===
The benefits of defined benefit and defined contribution plans differ based on the degree of financial security provided to the retiree. With defined benefit plans, retirees receive a guaranteed payout at retirement, determined by a fixed formula based on factors such as salary and years of service. The risk and responsibility of ensuring sufficient funding through retirement is borne by the employer or plan managers. This type of plan provides a level of financial security for retirees, ensuring they will receive a specific amount of income throughout their retirement years. However this income is not usually guaranteed to keep up with inflation, so its purchasing power may decline over the years.

On the other hand, defined contribution plans are dependent upon the amount of money contributed and the performance of the investment vehicles used. Employees are responsible for ensuring that their contributions are sufficient to provide for their retirement needs, and they face the risk of market fluctuations that could reduce their retirement savings. However, defined contribution plans provide more flexibility for employees, who can choose how much to contribute and how to invest their funds.

Hybrid plans, such as cash balance and pension equity plans, combine features of both defined benefit and defined contribution plans. These plans have become increasingly popular in the U.S. since the 1990s. Cash balance plans, for example, provide a guaranteed benefit like a defined benefit plan, but the benefit is expressed as an account balance, like a defined contribution plan. Pension equity plans are a type of cash balance plan that credits employee accounts with a percentage of their pay each year, similar to a defined contribution plan.

=== Incentives for parental investment ===
Pay-as-you-go pensions can misalign incentives between parental investment and elderly care. According to the old-age-security hypothesis, the elderly care by the child generation can offset the cost of raising a child.

=== Gender pension gap ===
The gender pension gap, the difference between genders in average pensions, varies by country. In OECD countries the gender pension gap varied from 3% in Estonia to 47% in Japan according to data between 2013 and 2018. Eastern European countries tend to have a smaller pension gender gap due to less pronounced gender differences in part-time jobs. Possible contributions to the pension gender gap include gender pay gaps, differences in employment rates, parental leave, unpaid care work and gender roles.

=== Years in retirement ===
There is a gender gap in expected years in retirement with 22.8 years for women and 18.4 years for men on average (OECD, 2022), contributed by sex differences in life expectancy. The difference in years in retirement contribute to gender-differentiated pension rates.

== Pillars ==
Most national pension systems are based on multi-pillar schemes to ensure greater flexibility and financial security to the old in contrast to reliance on one single system. In general, there are three main functions of pension systems: saving, redistribution and insurance functions. According to the report by the World Bank titled "Averting the Old Age Crisis", countries should consider separating the saving and redistributive functions, when creating pension systems, and placing them under different financing and managerial arrangements into three main pillars.

The Pillars of Old Age Income Security:

Properties	Mandatory publicly managed pillar	Mandatory privately managed pillar	Voluntary pillar
Financing	Tax-financed	Regulated fully funded	Fully funded
Form	Means tested, minimum pension guarantee, or flat	Personal savings plan or occupational plan	Personal savings plan or occupational plan
Objectives	Redistributive plus coinsurance	Savings plus coinsurance	Savings plus coinsurance

However, this typology is rather a prescriptive than a descriptive one and most specialists usually allocate all public programmes to the first pillar, including earnings-related public schemes, which does not fit the original definition of the first pillar.

=== Zero pillar ===
This non-contributory pillar was introduced only recently, aiming to alleviate poverty among the elderly, and permitting fiscal conditions. It is usually financed by the state and is in form of basic pension schemes or social assistance. In some typologies, the zero and the first pillar overlap.

=== First pillar ===
Pillar 1, sometimes referred to as the public pillar or first-tier, answers the aim to prevent the poverty of the elderly, provide some absolute, minimum income based on solidarity and replace some portion of lifetime pre-retirement income. It is financed on a redistributive principle without constructing large reserves and takes the form of mandatory contributions linked to earnings such as minimum pensions within earnings-related plans, or separate targeted programs for retirement income. These are provided by the public sector and can be pay-as-you-go financed.

=== Second pillar ===
Pillar 2, or the second tier, built on the basis of defined benefit and defined contribution plans with independent investment management, aims to protect the elderly from relative poverty and provides benefits supplementary to the income from the first pillar to contributors. Therefore, the second pillar fulfils the insurance function. In addition to DB's and DC's, other types of pension schemes of the second pillar are the contingent accounts, known also as notional defined contributions (implemented for example in Italy, Latvia, Poland and Sweden) or occupational pension schemes (applied, for instance, in Estonia, Germany and Norway).

=== Third pillar ===
The third tier consists of voluntary contributions in various different forms, including occupational or private saving plans, and products for individuals.

=== Fourth pillar ===
The fourth pillar is usually excluded from classifications since it does not usually have a legal basis and consists of "informal support (such as family), other formal social programs (such as health care or housing), and other individual assets (such as home ownership and reverse mortgages)."

These five pillars and their main criteria are summarised in the table below by Holzmann and Hinz.

Multipillar Pension Taxonomy:

Pillar	Objectives	Characteristics	Participation
0	Elderly poverty protection	Social pension, universal or means-tested	Universal or residual
1	Elderly poverty protection and consumption smoothing	Public pension plan, publicly managed, defined benefit or notional defined contribution	Mandated
2	Consumption smoothing and elderly poverty protection through minimum pension	Occupational or personal pension plans, fully funded defined benefit or fully funded defined contribution	Mandated
3	Consumption smoothing	Occupational or personal pension plans, partially or fully funded defined benefit or funded defined contribution	Voluntary
4	Elderly poverty protection and consumption smoothing	Access to informal (e.g. family support), other formal social programs (e.g. health) and other individual financial and nonfinancial assets (e.g. homeownership)	Voluntary

== Pension systems by country ==
First pillar of pension system by country: Basic non-contributory pension Mandatory individual accounts Provident fund system Workers can switch between social insurance system or individual accounts Social insurance system

Public pension spending is a significant part of government spending in many countries.

Country	Pension as % of government spending	Year
Australia	9.1	2022
Austria	25.0	2021
Belgium	19.5	2021
Canada	13.9	2022
Chile	10.8	2023
Colombia	11.8	2023
Costa Rica	16.2	2023
Czechia	18.2	2021
Denmark	15.2	2021
Estonia	16.1	2021
Finland	22.1	2021
France	22.9	2022
Germany	21.3	2021
Greece	28.5	2021
Hungary	15.9	2021
Iceland	5.9	2021
Ireland	12.5	2021
Israel	11.0	2023
Italy	28.7	2021
Japan	28.6	2022
South Korea	10.3	2022
Latvia	16.2	2021
Lithuania	17.4	2021
Luxembourg	20.1	2021
Mexico	13.4	2023
Netherlands	13.1	2021
New Zealand	12.0	2022
Norway	13.7	2021
Poland	25.7	2021
Portugal	27.3	2021
Slovakia	16.6	2021
Slovenia	21.3	2021
Spain	24.8	2021
Sweden	16.0	2021
Switzerland	18.4	2021
United Kingdom	15.2	2022
United States	18.1	2023

== History ==
In the classical world, Romans offered veteran legionnaires (centurions) military pensions, typically in the form of a land grant or a special, often semi-public, appointment. Augustus Caesar (63 BC–AD 14) introduced one of the first recognisable pension schemes in history with his military treasury. In 13 BC Augustus created a pension plan in which retired soldiers were to receive a pension (of minimum 3,000 denarii in a lump sum, which at the time represented around 13 times a legionnaires' annual salary) after 16 years of service in a legion and four years in the military reserves. The retiring soldiers were in the beginning paid from general revenues and later from a special fund (aeririum militare) established by Augustus in 5 or 6 AD. This was in an attempt to quell a rebellion within the Roman Empire which was facing militaristic turmoil at the time.

Widows' funds were among the first pension type arrangement to appear. For example, Duke Ernest the Pious of Gotha in Germany founded a widows' fund for clergy in 1645 and another for teachers in 1662. "Various schemes of provision for ministers' widows were then established throughout Europe at about the start of the eighteenth century, some based on a single premium others based on yearly premiums to be distributed as benefits in the same year."

Modern forms of pension systems were first introduced in the late 19th century. Germany was the first country to introduce a universal pension program for employees.

=== Germany ===
As part of Otto von Bismarck's social legislation, the Old Age and Disability Insurance Bill was enacted and implemented in 1889. The Old Age Pension program, financed by a tax on workers, was originally designed to provide a pension annuity for workers who reached the age of 70 years, though this was lowered to 65 years in 1916. Unlike accident insurance and health insurance, this program covered industrial, agrarian, artisans and servants from the start and was supervised directly by the state.

Germany's mandatory state pension provisions are based on the pay-as-you-go (or redistributive) model. Funds paid in by contributors (employees and employers) are not saved nor invested but are used to pay current pension obligations.

=== Ireland ===
There is a history of pensions in Ireland that can be traced back to Brehon Law imposing a legal responsibility on the kin group to take care of its members who were aged, blind, deaf, sick or insane. For a discussion on pension funds and early Irish law, see F Kelly, A Guide to Early Irish Law (Dublin, Dublin Institute for Advanced Studies, 1988). In 2010, there were over 76,291 pension schemes operating in Ireland.

In January 2018, a "total contributions approach" qualification system was announced, effective from March 2018, for those pensioners who reached state pension age after 1 September 2012. The new system requires a person to have 40 years' worth or contributions to receive the full rate and a minimum total period of paid contributions of 520 weeks with ten years' full coverage. The State Pension is payable from age 66 with the age being increased to 67 in 2021 and 68 in 2028.

=== Spain ===
The history of pensions in Spain began in 1908 with the creation of the National Insurance Institute (INP) and the design of old-age pensions in a free affiliation scheme subsidised by the State. Although in 1919 the pension system was made compulsory and in 1931 an attempt was made to unify the different branches of insurance, the INP failed to ensure that pensions acted as immediate remedial measures for the old-age problem that was evident at the time. Public intervention in social insurance in Spain during these years was greatly determined by the failure of private initiatives such as the Savings and Pension Fund of Barcelona.

The Mandatory Workers' Retirement (ROO) was the first compulsory social insurance in Spain and was aimed at wage earners between the ages of 16 and 65 who earned no more than 4,000 pesetas a year. This was followed by the creation of the Social Security system in 1963, early retirement and the possibility of partial retirement in 1978 and the special regime for self-employed workers in 1985.

Various reforms and adjustments have been made over time, such as the 1995 reform that established the sustainability factor and the 2011 reform that raised the retirement age from 65 to 67. Currently, the pension system in Spain is still under debate to ensure its long-term sustainability with proposals such as the implementation of private pension plans and the revision of the conditions of access to public pensions.

=== United Kingdom ===
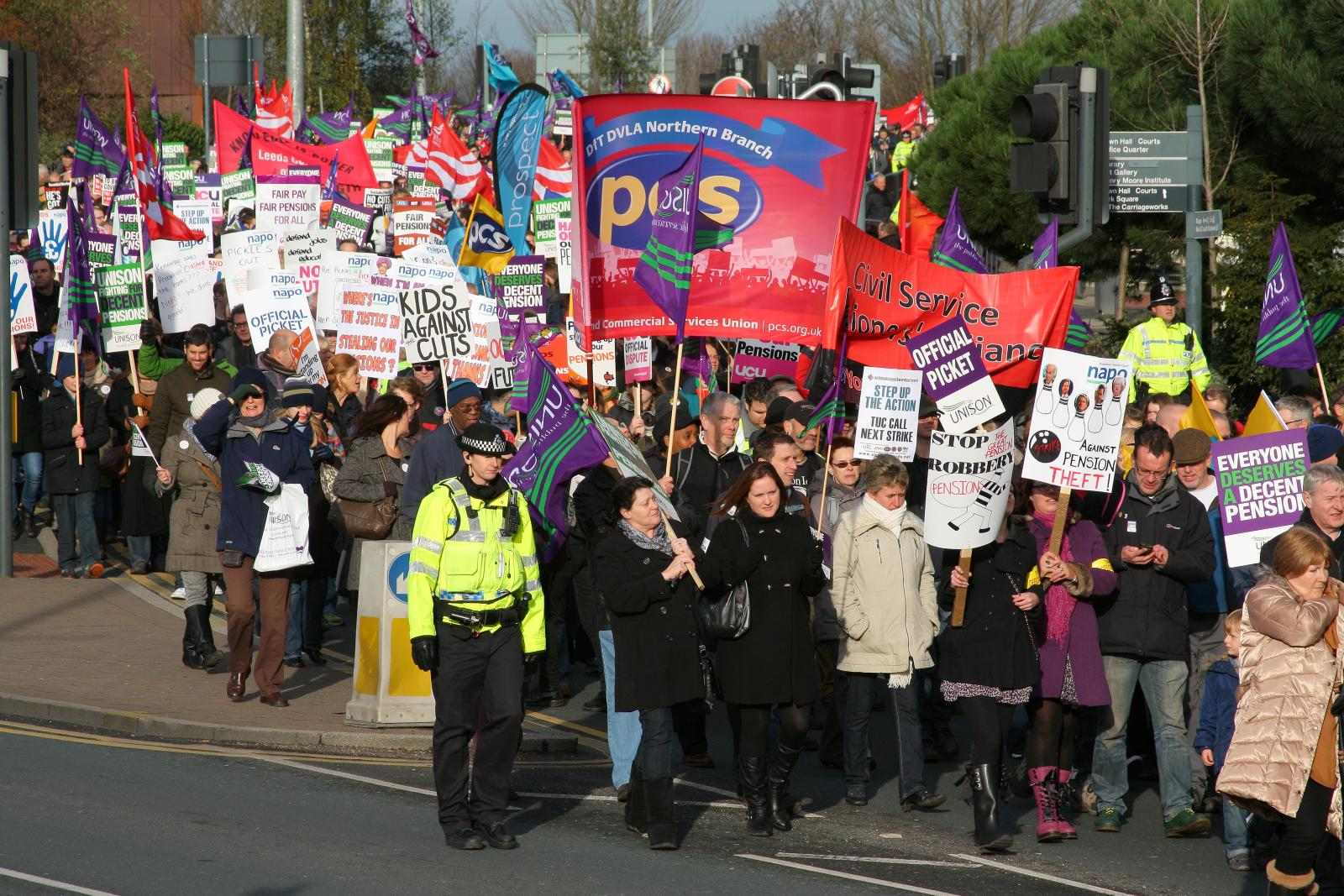
Public sector workers in Leeds striking over pension changes by the government in November 2011

The decline of Feudal systems and formation of national states throughout Europe led to the reemergence of standing armies with their allegiances to states. Consequently, the sixteenth century in England marked the establishment of standardised systems of military pensions. During its 1592–93 session, Parliament established disability payments or "reliefe for Souldiours ... [who] adventured their lives and lost their limbs or disabled their bodies" in the service of the Crown. This pension was again generous by contemporary standards, even though annual pensions were not to exceed ten pounds for "private soldiers", or twenty pounds for a "lieutenant".

The beginning of the modern state pension came with the Old Age Pensions Act 1908, that provided 5 shillings (£0.25) a week for those over 70 whose annual means do not exceed £31.50. It coincided with the Royal Commission on the Poor Laws and Relief of Distress 1905-09 and was the first step in the Liberal welfare reforms to the completion of a system of social security, with unemployment and health insurance through the National Insurance Act 1911.

In 1921, The Finance Act introduced tax relief on pension contributions in line with savings and life insurance. As a consequence, the overall size of the fund was increased since the income tax was now added to the pension as well.

Then in 1978, The State Earnings-Related Pension Scheme (SERPS) replaced The Graduated Pension Scheme from 1959, providing a pension related to earnings, in addition to the basic state pension. Employees and employers had the possibility to contribute to it between 6 April 1978 and 5 April 2002, when it was replaced by the State Second Pension.

After the Second World War, the National Insurance Act 1946 completed universal coverage of social security, introducing a State Pension for everybody on a contributory basis, with men being eligible at 65 and women at 60. The National Assistance Act 1948 (11 & 12 Geo. 6. c. 29) formally abolished the poor law, and gave a minimum income to those not paying National Insurance.

The early-1990s established the existing framework for state pensions in the Social Security Contributions and Benefits Act 1992 and Superannuation and other Funds (Validation) Act 1992. Following the highly respected Goode Report, occupational pensions were covered by comprehensive statutes in the Pension Schemes Act 1993 and the Pensions Act 1995.

In 2002, the Pensions Commission was established as a cross-party body to review pensions in the United Kingdom. The first Act to follow was the Pensions Act 2004 that updated regulation by replacing OPRA with the Pensions Regulator and relaxing the stringency of minimum funding requirements for pensions while ensuring protection for insolvent businesses. In a major update of the state pension, the Pensions Act 2007, which aligned and raised retirement ages. Following that, the Pensions Act 2008 has set up automatic enrolment for occupational pensions, and a public competitor designed to be a low-cost and efficient fund manager, called the National Employment Savings Trust (or "Nest").

=== United States ===
In the U.S., average balances of retirement accounts, for households having such accounts, exceed median net worth across all age groups. For those 65 and over, 11.6% of retirement accounts have balances of at least $1 million, more than twice that of the $407,581 average (shown). Those 65 and over have a median net worth of about $250,000 (shown), about a quarter of the group's average (not shown).

The first "American" pensions came in 1636, when Plymouth Colony, and subsequently, other colonies such as Virginia, Maryland (1670s) and NY (1690s), offered the first colonial pension. The general assembly of the Virginia Company followed by approving a resolution known as Virginia Act IX of 1644 stating that "...all hurt or maymed men be relieved and provided for by the several counties, where such men reside or inhabit." Furthermore, during King Philip's War, otherwise known as the First Indian War, this Act was expanded to widows and orphans in Virginia's Act of 1675.

Public pensions got their start with various 'promises', informal and legislated, made to veterans of the Revolutionary War and, more extensively, the Civil War. They were expanded greatly, and began to be offered by a number of state and local governments during the early Progressive Era in the late nineteenth century.

Federal civilian pensions were offered under the Civil Service Retirement System (CSRS), formed in 1920. CSRS provided retirement, disability and survivor benefits for most civilian employees in the U.S. Federal government, until the creation of a new Federal agency, the Federal Employees Retirement System (FERS), in 1987.

Pension plans became popular in the United States during World War II, when wage freezes prohibited outright increases in workers' pay. The defined benefit plan had been the most popular and common type of retirement plan in the United States through the 1980s; since that time, defined contribution plans have become the more common type of retirement plan in the United States and many other western countries.

In April 2012, the Northern Mariana Islands Retirement Fund filed for Chapter 11 bankruptcy protection. The retirement fund is a defined benefit type pension plan and was only partially funded by the government, with only $268.4 million in assets and $911 million in liabilities. The plan experienced low investment returns and a benefit structure that had been increased without raises in funding. According to Pensions and Investments, this is "apparently the first" U.S. public pension plan to declare bankruptcy.

== See also ==
- Elderly care
- Fiscal sustainability
- Generational accounting
- Mothers' pensions
- Pension led funding
- Pension model
- Pension spiking
- Retirement planning
- Social policy

Specific:

- Bankruptcy code
- Ham and Eggs Movement, California pension proposal of the 1930s-40s
- Individual Pension Plan (IPP)
- Pension Rights Center
- Provident Fund
- Roth 401(k)
- Universities Superannuation Scheme
