= Pensions crisis =

Predicted difficulty in funding pensions

Old-age dependency ratio (2017)

The pensions crisis, or pensions time bomb is the predicted difficulty in paying for corporate or government pension benefits in various countries, due to a mismatch between pension obligations and the resources set aside to fund them. The basic difficulty of the pension problem is that institutions must be sustained over far longer than the political planning horizon. Shifting demographics are causing a lower ratio of workers per retiree; contributing factors include retirees living longer (increasing the relative number of retirees), and lower birth rates (decreasing the relative number of workers, especially relative to the Post-WW2 Baby Boom). There is significant debate regarding the magnitude and importance of the problem, as well as the solutions. One aspect and challenge of the "Pension timebomb" is that several countries' governments have a constitutional obligation to provide public services to their citizens, but funding for these programs has been strained due to increasing dependency ratio, which increases costs of elderly care. In pay-as-you-go pension systems decreasing total fertility rate causes lifetime pension benefits to be smaller than lifetime contributions.

For example, as of January 2026, the estimated underfunding of the United States Social Security program is $29.3 trillion or 1.5% of GDP over the years 2026-2100. This has been increased from $25.1 trillion in the previous year's report of the Social Security Administration. This amount would have to be set aside today so that the principal and interest would cover the program's shortfall between tax revenues and payouts over the next 75 years.

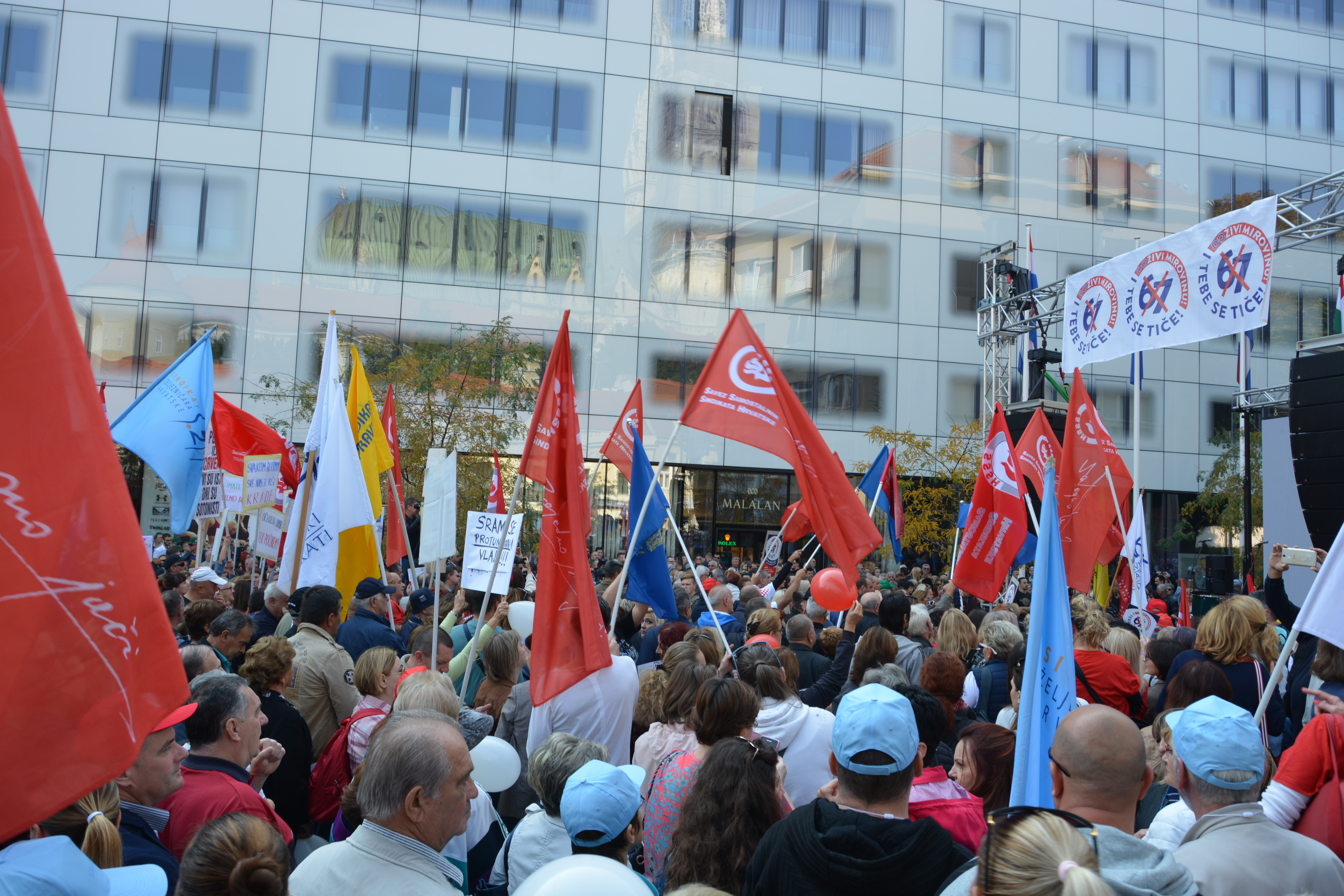
Zagreb pension reform protest in October 2018

== Background ==
The ratio of workers to pensioners, the "support ratio", is declining in most countries. This is due to two demographic factors: increased life expectancy coupled with a fixed retirement age, and a decrease in the fertility rate. Currentlty, over 50% countries are below the replacement rate of 2.1 child per woman. Increased life expectancy (with fixed retirement age) increases the number of retirees at any time, as individuals are retired for a longer fraction of their lives, while decreases in the fertility rate decrease the number of taxpayers to fund pension obligations.

In 1950 there were 7.2 people aged 20–64 for every person of 65 or over in the OECD countries. By 1980, the support ratio dropped to 5.1 and by 2010 it was 4.1. It is projected to reach just 2.1 by 2050. The average ratio for the EU was 3.5 in 2010 and is projected to reach 1.8 by 2050. Examples of support ratios for selected countries and regions in 1970, 2010, and projected for 2050 using the medium variant:

Country or Region	1970	2010	2050
United States	5.2	4.6	2.5
Japan	8.7	2.6	1.3
United Kingdom	4.3	3.6	2.1
Germany	4.1	3.0	1.7
France	4.2	3.5	1.9
World	8.9	7.4	3.5
Africa	13.6	13.2	8.8
Asia	12.0	8.6	3.3
Europe	5.4	3.8	1.9
Latin America & Caribbean	10.8	8.3	3.0
Northern America	5.3	4.6	2.4
Oceania	7.2	5.3	3.0

=== Key terms ===
- Support ratio: The number of people of working age compared with the number of people beyond retirement age
- Participation rate: The proportion of the population that is in the labor force
- Defined benefit: A pension linked to the employee's salary, where the risk falls on the employer to pay a contractual amount
- Defined contribution: A pension dependent on the amount contributed and related investment performance, where the risk falls mainly on the employee

== Pension computations ==
Pension computations are often performed by actuaries using assumptions regarding current and future demographics, life expectancy, investment returns, levels of contributions or taxation, and payouts to beneficiaries, among other variables. One area of contention relates to the assumed annual rate of investment return. If a higher investment return is assumed, relatively lower contributions are demanded of those paying into the system. Critics have argued that investment return assumptions are artificially inflated, to reduce the required contribution amounts by individuals and governments paying into the pension system. For example, bond yields, the return on guaranteed investments, in the US and elsewhere are low. The U.S.and other stock markets did not consistently beat inflation between 2000 and 2010.

But multiple pensions have annual investment return assumptions in the 7–8% p.a. range, which are closer to the pre-2000 average return. If these rates were lowered by 1–2 percentage points, the required pension contributions taken from salaries or via taxation would increase dramatically. By one estimate, each 1% reduction means 10% more in contributions. For example, if a pension program reduced its investment return rate assumption from 8% pa to 7% pa, a person contributing $100 per month to their pension would be required to contribute $110. Attempting to sustain better-than-market returns can also cause portfolio managers to take on more risk.

The International Monetary Fund reported in April 2012 that developed countries may be underestimating the impact of longevity on their public and private pension calculations. The IMF estimated that if individuals live three years longer than expected, the incremental costs could approach 50% of 2010 GDP in advanced economies and 25% in emerging economies. In the United States, this would represent a 9% increase in pension obligations. The IMF recommendations included raising the retirement age commensurate with life expectancy.

== Proposed reforms ==
Reform ideas can be divided into several primary categories:

- The worker-retiree ratio and old-age dependency ratio can be addressed by raising the retirement age, part-time work by the aged, and changing employment and fertility policy.
- The pension obligations can be reduced by reducing future payment amounts (by, for example, adjusting the formula that determines the level of benefits or by shifting from defined benefit to defined contribution pension types)
- Resources to fund pensions can be increased by increasing contribution rates (for example by the encouragement or reform of private saving to grow the savings rate using methodologies such as mandatory and auto enrollment) or raising taxes. In the United States, since 1979 there has been a significant shift away from defined benefit plans with a corresponding increase in defined contribution plans, like the 401(k). In 1979, 62% of private sector employees with pension plans of some type were covered by defined benefit plans, with about 17% covered by defined contribution plans. By 2009, these had reversed to approximately 7% and 68%, respectively. As of 2011, governments were beginning to follow the private sector in this regard. Recently there have been some proposals for confiscation of private pension plans and merging them into government run plans.
- Pension systems can be reformed to be intrinsically balanced. In his book titled The Pension Fund Revolution (1996), Peter Drucker point out the theoretical difficulty of a solution, and proposed a second best policy that may be enable to enforce.

=== Auto-Enrollment ===
Research proves that employees save more if they are mandatorily or automatically enrolled in savings plans. Laws compelling mandatory contributions are often politically difficult to implement. Auto-Enrolment schemes are easier to implement because employees are enrolled but have the option to drop out, as opposed to being required to take action to opt into the plan or being legally compelled to participate. Most countries that launched mandatory or auto-enrolment schemes did so with the intention of employees saving into defined contribution ("DC") plans.

Whilst mandatory & auto-enrolment schemes have been incredibly successful overall, a major problem was created by the fact that they were launched as DC plans with no real consideration given to what happens when plan members reach retirement and need to begin decumulating their savings.

As an example, Singapore & Malaysia both launched mandatory enrolment schemes Central Provident Fund or CPF in 1955 and the Employees Provident Fund (Malaysia) or EPF in 1951.

After the first generation of employees retired, they typically withdrew their pension balances and spent it. The Singapore Government responded by launching CPF Life which mandatorily annuitised a large portion of the CPF savings with the theory being that 'the government tells you and me, "The reason why I must take $161,000 away from you is because if I don't, if I give you the full $200,000 to take out at age 55, some of you, you will take the money and you will go Batam. Some of you will go Tanjung Pinang. Some of you suddenly got a lot of relatives popped up then you don't know how to say no because you're so nice. Then after a while, we have no money left."'.

As a result, Singaporean employees now automatically receive a pension income for life in retirement from CPF life. The EPF on the other hand has never been able to successfully introduce a decumulation solution. Reports produced by the EPF show that 90% of EPF savers have spent all of their savings within 18 months of reaching retirement age.

Following the UK's successful by introducing Automatic enrolment in 2012 based upon behavioural economic theory the Department for Work & Pensions has now proposed new legislation which enables the creation of risk-sharing decumulation solutions such as collective defined contribution schemes and Tontine pension schemes the latter of which also benefits from behavioural economic effects according to Adam Smith in his book The Wealth of Nations.

== By country ==
=== United States ===
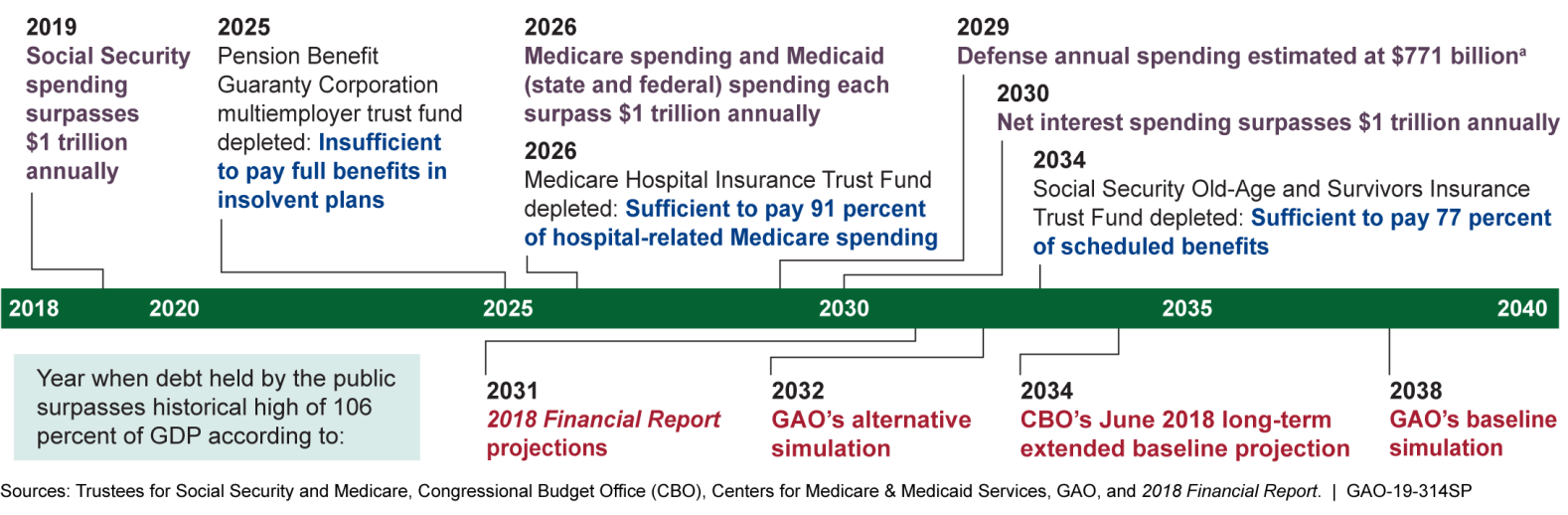
A timeline showing projected debt milestones from the CBO

The Pension Benefit Guaranty Corporation's (PBGC) financial future is uncertain because of long-term challenges related to its funding and governance structure. PBGC's liabilities exceeded its assets by about $51 billion as of the end of fiscal year 2018—an increase of about $16 billion from the end of fiscal year 2013. In addition, PBGC estimated that its exposure to potential additional future losses for underfunded plans in both the single and multiemployer programs was nearly $185 billion, of which the single-employer program accounts for $175 billion of this amount. PBGC projected that there is more than a 90 percent likelihood that the multiemployer program will be insolvent by the year 2025 and a 99 percent likelihood by 2026.

==== U.S. Social Security program ====
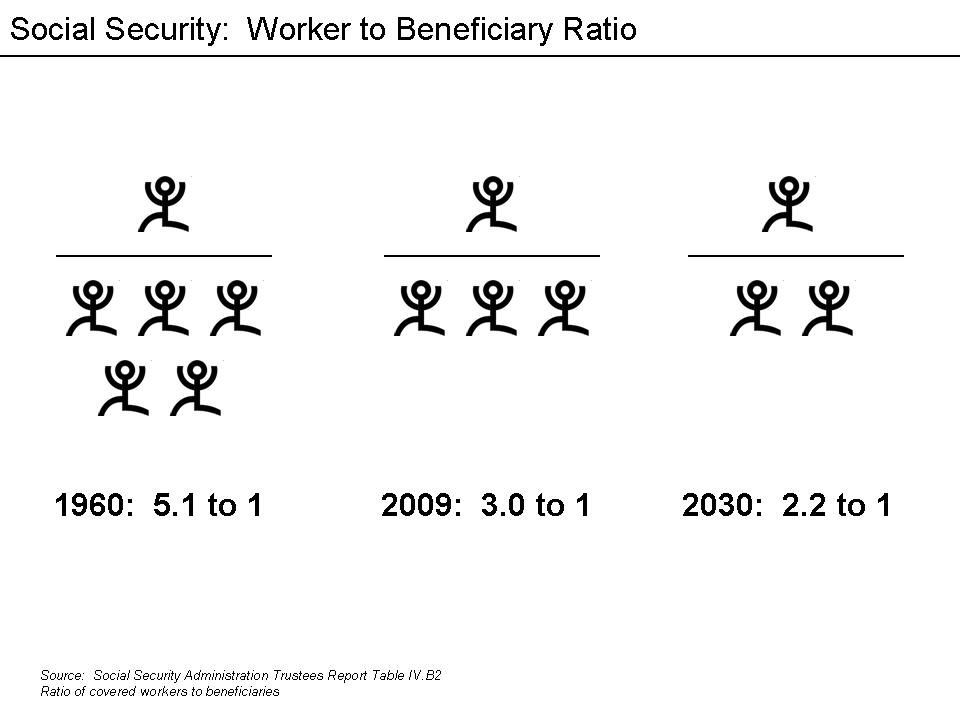
Social Security – Ratio of Covered Workers to Retirees

The number of U.S. workers per retiree was 5.1 in 1960; this declined to 3.0 in 2009 and is projected to decline to 2.1 by 2030. The number of Social Security program recipients is expected to increase from 44 million in 2010 to 73 million in 2030. The present value of unfunded obligations under Social Security as of August 2010 was approximately $5.4 trillion. In other words, this amount would have to be set aside today such that the principal and interest would cover the shortfall over the next 75 years. The Social Security Administration projects that an increase in payroll taxes equivalent to 1.9% of the payroll tax base or 0.7% of GDP would be necessary to put the Social Security program in fiscal balance for the next 75 years. Over an infinite time horizon, these shortfalls average 3.4% of the payroll tax base and 1.2% of GDP.

According to official government projections, the Social Security is facing a $13.2 trillion unfunded liability over the next 75 years.

==== U.S. State-level issues ====
Since 2001, the financial health of state and local retirement systems have struggled to recover from the historic economic downturns of the Dot-Com Crash, Great Recession and the Covid-19 Pandemic.

In financial terms, the "crisis" represents the gap between the amount of promised benefits and the resources set aside to pay for them. For example, multiple U.S. states have underfunded pensions, meaning the state has not contributed the amount estimated to be necessary to pay future obligations to retired workers.

Equable Institute reported in July 2022 that U.S. state and local pension plans have promised $6.3 Trillion in benefits, but only have $4.9 Trillion in assets to pay for these benefits — an estimated $1.4 trillion shortfall. Due to unprecedented market volatility, the aggregated funded ratio for state and local pension plans is 77.9% as of July 2022, down from 84.8% in 2021, representing the largest decline in funded ratio since the Great Recession.

However, since state and local plans are managed independently from one another, the scale of the challenges facing pension funds varies widely by state. The image below shows the 2021 and 2022 funded ratios of states as of July 2022 — illustrating both the spectrum of pension health in the US and the impact of market volatility on funded ratio.

Funded ratios alone, however, aren't the only way to measure the scale of the funding challenges facing pension funds. The size of unfunded liabilities relative to the size of a state's GDP, provides a sense of the scale of resources that are needed to restore retirement systems to full funding.

By this metric, Illinois, Kentucky and New Jersey are the states most economically burdened by their unfunded liabilities. Conversely, Nebraska, Utah, New York and Idaho's retirement systems represent a negligible impact to their states' economic demands, as they have been able to maintain fully-funded status.

The Center on Budget and Policy Priorities (CBPP) reported in January 2011 that:

- As of 2010, the state pension shortfall ranges between $700 billion and $3 trillion, depending on the discount rate used to value the future obligations. The $700 billion figure is based on using a discount rate in the 8% range representative of historical pension fund investment returns, while the $3 trillion represents a discount rate in the 5% range representative of historical Treasury bond ("risk-free") yields.
- This shortfall emerged after the year 2000, substantially due to tax revenue declines from two recessions.
- States contribute approximately 3.8% of their operating budgets to their pension programs on average. This would have to be raised to 5.0% to cover the $700 billion shortfall and around 9.0% to cover the $3 trillion shortfall.
- Certain states (e.g., Illinois, California, and New Jersey) have significantly underfunded their pension plans and would have to raise contributions towards 7–9% of their operating budgets, even under the more aggressive 8% discount rate assumption.
- States have significant time before the pension assets are exhausted. Sufficient funds are present already to pay obligations for the next 15–20 years, as many began funding their pensions back in the 1970s. The CBPP estimates that states have up to 30 years to address their pension shortfalls.
- States accumulated more than $3 trillion in assets between 1980 and 2007 and there is reason to assume they can and will do that again, as the economy recovers.
- Nearly all debt issued by a state (generally via bonds) is used to fund its capital budget, not its operating budget. Capital budgets are used for infrastructure like roads, bridges and schools. Operating budgets pay pensions, salaries, rent, etc. So state debt levels related to bond issuance and the funding of pension obligations have substantially remained separate issues up to this point.
- State debt levels have ranged between 12% and 18% of GDP between 1979 and 2009. During the second quarter of 2010, the debt level was 16.7%.
- State interest expenses remains a "modest" 4–5% of all state/local spending.
- Pension promises in some states are contractually binding. In a number of states, constitutional amendments are also required to modify them. Other states have different pension laws and policies.

The pension replacement rate, or percentage of a worker's pre-retirement income that the pension replaces, varies widely from state to state. It bears little correlation to the percentage of state workers who are covered by a collective bargaining agreement. For example, the replacement rate in Missouri is 55.4%, while in New York it is 77.1%. In Colorado, replacement rates are higher but these employees are barred from participating in Social Security.

In a 2022 report, Equable Institute found that the value of public teacher pension benefits have declined significantly in the last two decades, as states have opened new pension plans offering less generous benefits. An average teacher hired in 2005 can expect to receive approximately $768,000 in total lifetime pension payments, whereas the average teacher hired for the 2023 school year can only expect to earn $668,000 — a $100,000 decline.

The Congressional Budget Office reported in May 2011 that "most state and local pension plans probably will have sufficient assets, earnings, and contributions to pay scheduled benefits for a number of years and thus will not need to address their funding shortfalls immediately. But they will probably have to do so eventually, and the longer they wait, the larger those shortfalls could become. Most of the additional funding needed to cover pension liabilities is likely to take the form of higher government contributions and therefore will require higher taxes or reduced government services for residents".

===== New Jersey =====
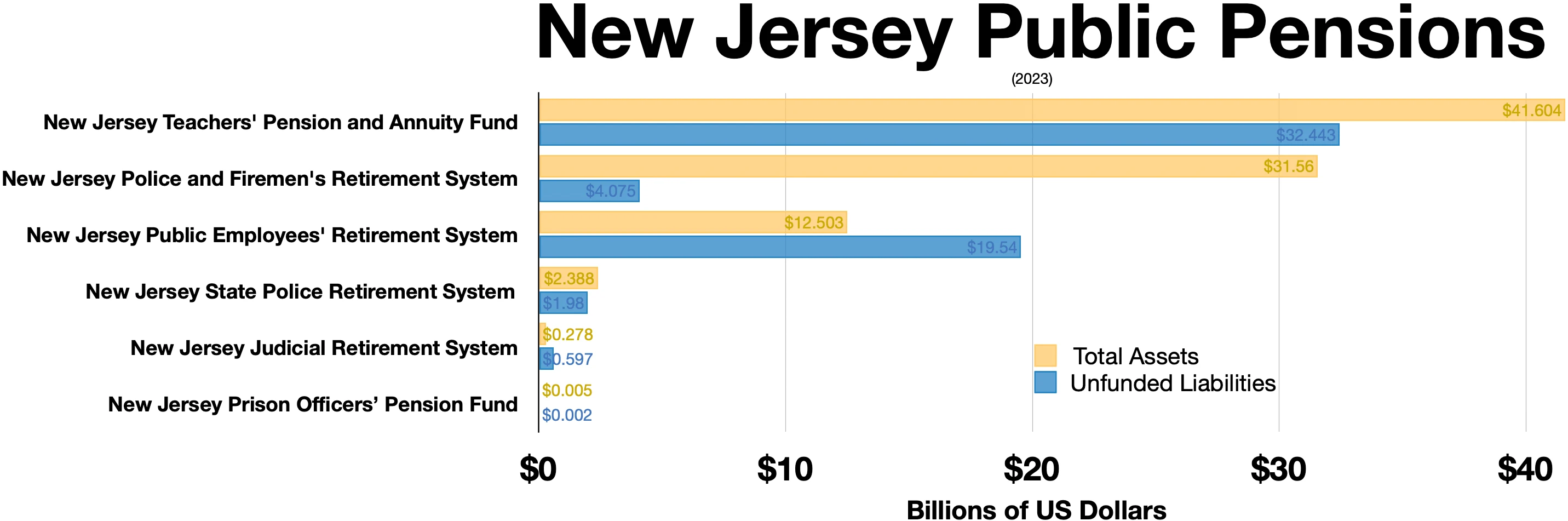
New Jersey public pensions Total assets Unfunded Liabilities

New Jersey's pensions used new calculation formulas at the end of 2024 and the new projections have 6 of the 7 state pension funds becoming depleted and insolvent by 2027 and the largest fund, Teachers' Pension and Annuity Fund (TPAF), could run out in 13 years.

==== U.S. city and municipality pensions ====
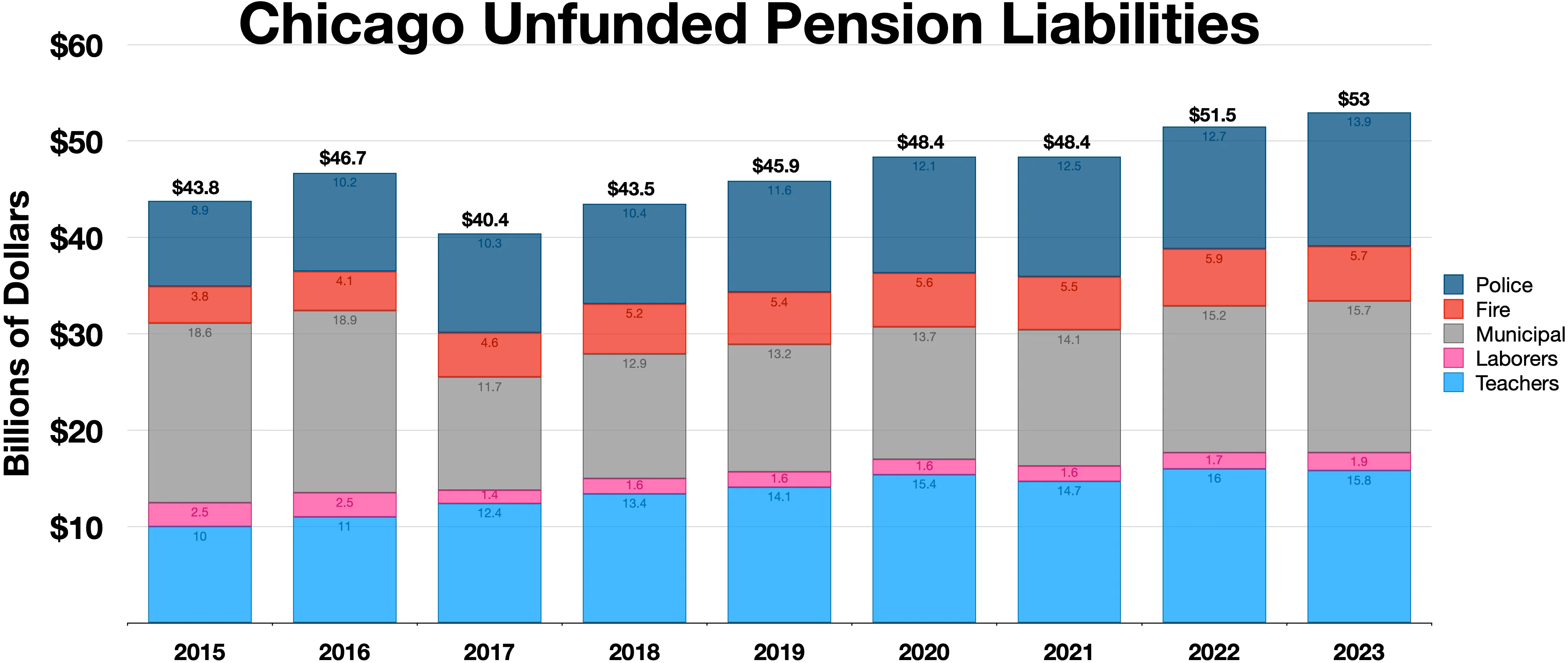
Chicago and Chicago Public Schools unfunded pension liabilities

In addition to states, U.S. cities and municipalities also have pension programs. There are 299 state pension plans and approximately 5,977 locally administered plans. The term unfunded liability represents the amount of money that would have to be set aside today such that interest and principal would cover the gap between program cash inflows and outflows over a long period of time. On average, pensions consume nearly 20 percent of municipal budgets. But if trends continue, over half of every dollar in tax revenue would go to pensions, and by some estimates in some instances up to 75 percent.

The aggregate funded ratio for municipal plans in the US are slightly better than their statewide counterparts. Local plans are 78.2% funded in 2022, compared to 77.8% for statewide plans. However, the funding trends of municipally-managed plans are similar, if not identical to statewide plans.

Most public pension unfunded liabilities reside within statewide retirement systems, primarily because they are simply larger, with more members and more promised benefits. Locally-managed public pension plans account for approximately 12% of all unfunded liabilities of non-federal retirement systems.

==== Shift from defined benefit to defined contribution pensions ====
The Social Security Administration reported in 2009 that there is a long-term trend of pensions switching from defined benefit (DB) (i.e., a lifetime annuity typically based on years of service and final salary) to defined contribution (DC) (e.g., 401(k) plans, where the worker invests a certain amount, often with a match from the employer, and can access the money upon retirement or under special conditions.) The report concluded that: "On balance, there would be more losers than winners and average family incomes would decline. The decline in family income is expected to be much larger for last-wave boomers born from 1961 to 1965 than for first-wave boomers born from 1946 to 1950, because last-wave boomers are more likely to have their DB pensions frozen with relatively little job tenure."

The percentage of workers covered by a traditional defined benefit (DB) pension plan declined steadily from 38% in 1980 to 20% in 2008. In contrast, the percentage of workers covered by a defined contribution (DC) pension plan has been increasing over time. From 1980 through 2008, the proportion of private wage and salary workers participating in only DC pension plans increased from 8% to 31%. Most of the shift has been the private sector, with few changes in the public sector. Some experts expect that most private-sector plans will be frozen in the next few years and eventually terminated. Under the typical DB plan freeze, current participants will receive retirement benefits based on their accruals up to the date of the freeze, but will not accumulate any additional benefits; new employees will not be covered. Instead, employers will either establish new DC plans or increase contributions to existing DC plans.

Employees in unions are more likely to be covered by a defined benefit plan, with 67% of union workers covered by such a plan during 2011 versus 13% of non-union workers.

Economist Paul Krugman wrote in November 2013: "Today, however, workers who have any retirement plan at all generally have defined-contribution plans—basically, 401(k)'s—in which employers put money into a tax-sheltered account that's supposed to end up big enough to retire on. The trouble is that at this point it's clear that the shift to 401(k)'s was a gigantic failure. Employers took advantage of the switch to surreptitiously cut benefits; investment returns have been far lower than workers were told to expect; and, to be fair, many people haven't managed their money wisely. As a result, we're looking at a looming retirement crisis, with tens of millions of Americans facing a sharp decline in living standards at the end of their working lives. For many, the only thing protecting them from abject penury will be Social Security."

A 2014 Gallup poll indicated that 21% of investors had either taken an early withdrawal of their 401(k) defined contribution retirement plan or a loan against it over the previous five years; while both options are possible, they are not the intended purpose of 401k plans and can have substantial costs in taxes, fees and a smaller retirement fund. Fidelity Investments reported in February 2014 that:

- The average 401(k) balance reached a record $89,300 in the fourth quarter of 2013, a 15.5% increase over 2012 and almost double the low of $46,200 set in 2009 (which was affected by the Great Recession).
- The average balance for persons 55 and older was $165,200.
- Approximately one-third (35%) of all 401(k) participants cashed out their accounts when they left their jobs in 2013 (rather than rolling them to an Individual Retirement Account), which can cost investors substantially in terms of penalties and taxes.

=== UK ===
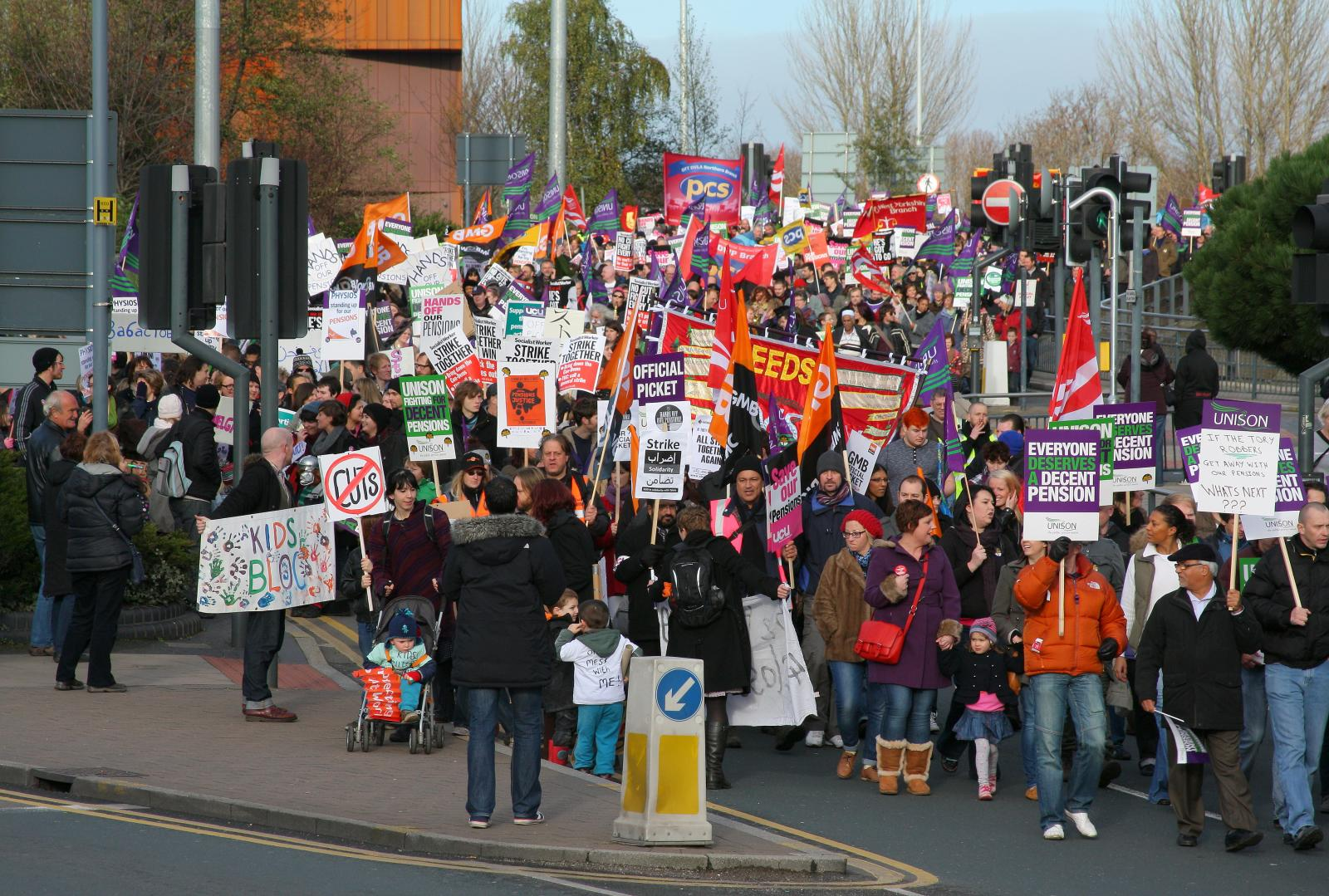
Public sector workers in Leeds striking over pension changes by the government in November 2011

Due to the low savings ratio, rapidly increasing longevity, new taxation of pension funds (for instance the removal of the right to reclaim withholding tax on equity dividends), and above all falling investment returns, many pension funds are in difficulties in the early 21st century. Most of these funds have moved from defined benefit (final salary) to contribution-based benefits. Thousands of private funds have been wound up. In October 2017 the UK Government implemented a mandatory automatic enrolment system where full-time employees and employers have to make contributions to a workplace pension scheme. The UK Government commissioned an independent review of the State pension age by John Cridland and in 2017, amongst other measures, it proposed increasing the state pension age to 68 and removing the triple lock on state pensions.

==== Risk-Sharing Pensions ====
In 2018, the UK's Department for Work and Pensions began a public consultation on the potential launch of risk-sharing pensions. The consultation focused on the potential benefits of collective defined contribution pension schemes, or "CDCs", which function like a Tontine by enabling savers to pool their money into a single fund to share investment risk and longevity risk. These schemes became popular in the Netherlands in the early 2000s. Legislation which would enable the UK's pension industry to reform its Defined Benefit and Defined Contribution schemes to CDC's is currently in the process of being passed by the UK's House of Commons.

=== Finland ===
Since the early 2000s Finland has had a wide ranging discussion and debate on how to solve the oncoming problems of an ageing population, shrinking work-age population and an increased strain to the social and healthcare services caused by the ageing population, who on average use much more healthcare services than the working-age population.

Prime Minister Matti Vanhanen's first government attempted to overhaul the entire municipal and service industries by allocating resources better, establishing efficiency to the social and healthcare sectors and attempting to curve the future ageing population's strain on the system as well as force-joining several smaller municipalities to larger ones (that couldn't themselves afford legally mandated municipal services like healthcare due to a lack of funding). From then Jyrki Katainen (2011-2014), Alexander Stubb (2014-2015), Juha Sipilä (2015-2019), Antti Rinne (2019) and the Marin governments (2019-) have tried to overhaul the social and healthcare system (Sote-law) that includes both structural reforms but also answers and solutions to the increased strain on Finland's public services by the ageing population, as it has constitutional problems: the government and municipalities are constitutionally obliged to provide healthcare and social services to its citizens, but several smaller municipalities lack funding due to a dried taxpayer base and an ageing population. The Marin government managed to pass the "Sote-law", which attempts to solve some problems with the ageing population.

== Criticisms ==
=== Other sources of income ===
Some claim that the pensions crisis does not exist or is overstated, as pensioners in developed countries faced with population aging are often able to unlock considerable housing wealth and make returns from other investments or employment. These claims, certainly in the UK, are unfounded as Government employee guaranteed final salary pension schemes have massive deficits (£53 billion in 2008) and, regardless of the equity in their employees homes, they are still contracted to pay retired staff an agreed amount, which they are increasingly unable to do.

=== Demographic transition ===
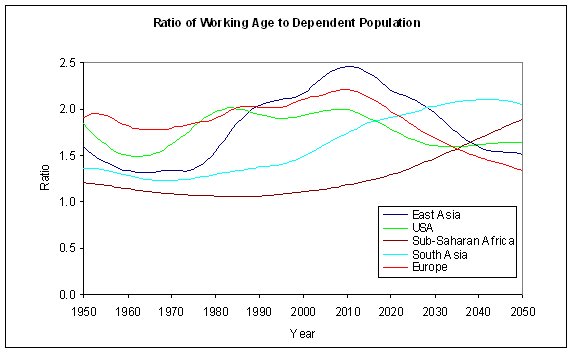
Inverse dependency ratio (workers per dependent) by world regions, 1950–2050, notably showing demographic windows in the US and East Asia

Some argue (FAIR 2000) that the crisis is overstated, and for many regions there is no crisis, because the total dependency ratio – composed of aged and youth – is simply returning to long-term norms, but with more aged and fewer youth: looking only at aged dependency ratio is only one half of the coin. The dependency ratio is not increasing significantly, but rather its composition is changing.

In more detail: as a result of the demographic transition from "short-lived, high birth-rate" society to "long-lived, low birth-rate" society, there is a demographic window when an unusually high portion of the population is working age, because first death rate decreases, which increases the working age population, then birth rate decreases, reducing the youth dependency ratio, and only then does the aged population grow. The decreased death rate having little effect initially on the population of the aged (say, 60+) because there are relatively few near-aged (say, 50–60) who benefit from the fall in death rate, and significantly more near-working age (say, 10–20) who do. Once the aged population grows, the dependency ratio returns to approximately the same level it was prior to the transition.

Thus, by this argument, there is no pensions crisis, just the end of a temporary golden age, and added costs in pensions are recovered by savings in paying for youth.

== See also ==
- Criticism of welfare
- Demographic window
- Dependency ratio
- Generational accounting
- Filial responsibility laws
- Jeremy Gold
- Pension
- Public debt
- Retirement plan
- Social Security debate (United States)
- Social Security
- Sub-replacement fertility
