= Collective defined contribution =

Type of pension

The Collective defined contribution (CDC) pension schemes are occupational pension arrangements that pool contributions from members and employers in a single collective fund and aim to provide a target income for life rather than a guaranteed benefit. Contributions are fixed in advance, as in a defined contribution pension scheme, but assets are invested collectively and investment and longevity risks are shared between members, so that benefits can be adjusted up or down to keep the scheme in balance. In design, CDC schemes sit between defined benefit pension schemes, where most risk is borne by the sponsoring employer, and individual defined contribution schemes, where most risk falls on the saver.

Research and policy work has suggested that CDC schemes can in some circumstances provide more stable or higher average retirement incomes than individual defined contribution arrangements, and they are intended to offer a single route from workplace saving into a lifetime pension income. Advantages include the sharing of longevity risk, the ability to invest in growth assets over the long term and cost certainty for employers. Concerns include that pensions are not guaranteed and may be cut if funding falls, that intergenerational fairness can be difficult to achieve and that the schemes can be complex to govern and to explain.

CDC-style schemes or closely related collective risk-sharing arrangements have been developed in countries such as the Netherlands and Denmark and were introduced in the United Kingdom as "collective money purchase" schemes by the Pension Schemes Act 2021.

== Concept and design ==
Collective defined contribution schemes pool contributions from employers and members into a single fund that is invested collectively. The scheme aims to provide each member with a target income in retirement that is calculated using rules set out in advance, for example, a target pension earned for each year of service. Unlike a defined benefit pension scheme, the income is not guaranteed by the employer, and unlike an individual defined contribution pension arrangement, members do not hold individual investment accounts but share in the outcomes of the collective fund.

The level of benefits in a CDC is determined by the relationship between the scheme's assets and the value of promised target pensions. Scheme rules specify how assets are to be valued, how target benefits are calculated and how benefits will be adjusted if the scheme is over or under its target funding level. When funding allows, pensions in payment and accrued target benefits may be increased, often in line with inflation, while if funding falls short then increases may be reduced or, in some designs, benefits can be cut to bring the scheme back towards balance.

Investment and longevity risks are shared across the membership of the scheme. Because assets are invested and managed collectively, CDC schemes can maintain an investment strategy that is more heavily weighted towards growth assets for longer than is typical in individual defined contribution arrangements, while avoiding the need for employers to guarantee benefits as in defined benefit schemes.

== Advantages ==
Collective defined contribution schemes are intended to offer a simpler path to a lifetime pension income than individual defined contribution arrangements. The same scheme is used to build up savings and to pay a pension in retirement, so members do not need to decide when to buy an annuity or how to manage drawdown, while longevity risk is shared across the membership rather than borne by individuals.

Pensions Policy Institute analysis for the UK market has reported illustrative cases in which long-term replacement rates in CDC schemes exceed those in individual defined contribution schemes, reflecting the ability to hold growth assets for longer and to share longevity and investment risks between members.

For employers, CDC schemes can offer cost certainty because contribution rates are fixed in advance as in individual defined contribution schemes, while investment and longevity risks are shared within the collective rather than guaranteed by the sponsoring employer. Governments and regulators have highlighted the potential for large CDC funds to invest at scale in long-term assets and to achieve economies of scale in administration and investment, although the extent to which these advantages are realised in practice depends on scheme design, regulation and governance.

== Disadvantages ==
Benefits in collective defined contribution schemes are not guaranteed and can be reduced if funding falls. Target pensions depend on investment returns and assumptions about longevity, so members bear the risk that their income in retirement may be lower than initially projected.

In a CDC scheme different cohorts of members are connected through the collective fund, so decisions about contribution rates, benefit targets and adjustments can affect younger and older members in different ways. Research for the Pensions Policy Institute and submissions to government and parliamentary consultations highlight the risk that some cohorts may subsidise others if benefit adjustment rules or transfer terms are not designed carefully and revisited over time.

Trustees of CDC schemes may need additional skills and regulatory oversight compared to traditional schemes, while members must understand that benefits are targeted rather than guaranteed and may vary. It has been suggested that the scope for genuine intergenerational risk sharing can be limited by regulatory constraints, and that CDC may not deliver clear advantages over individual defined contribution arrangements once costs, governance requirements and the absence of individual choice over investment and decumulation are taken into account.

== Implementation by country ==
Collective defined contribution schemes and similar collective risk-sharing arrangements have so far been introduced in a limited number of countries.

=== Netherlands ===
The Netherlands is an early example of similar collective arrangements. Second pillar occupational schemes are usually sector-wide or company pension funds that receive fixed contributions and target a career average pension with conditional indexation. Benefits can be increased or reduced when funding moves away from target, so that investment and longevity risks are shared collectively rather than being guaranteed by employers. Some research argues that successive reforms have in practice transformed many Dutch defined benefit schemes into collective defined contribution contracts.

In 2023, the Future Pensions Act (Wet toekomst pensioenen) came into force. Under the reform almost all occupational schemes must convert by 2028 to new contribution-based contracts. Providers can choose between a solidarity contribution scheme and a flexible contribution scheme, both of which are defined contribution in law but keep collective investment strategies, shared buffers and rules for allocating gains and losses between different age groups.

=== Denmark ===
Denmark combines a flat-rate public pension with large occupational schemes that are mostly defined contribution in legal form. Occupational funds usually invest assets collectively and provide lifelong income for many members, so that individuals share investment and longevity risks with a wider group rather than bearing those risks alone. Some occupational schemes and the statutory ATP scheme have been described as examples of CDC-style arrangements because they use deferred annuities and collective reserves to provide pensions that can be adjusted when conditions change.

=== United Kingdom ===
In the United Kingdom, CDC schemes are a new legal category known in legislation as collective money purchase schemes. Following earlier consultations, the Pension Schemes Act 2021 and the Occupational Pension Schemes (Collective Money Purchase Schemes) Regulations 2022 created a regulatory framework for single-employer and connected multi-employer CDC schemes. The Pensions Regulator has published a code of practice and supporting guidance setting out authorisation criteria, governance expectations and ongoing supervision for these schemes.

The first UK CDC scheme, the Royal Mail Collective Pension Plan, was authorised in April 2023 and opened to members on 7 October 2024. It is a single-employer whole-life scheme for eligible Royal Mail employees that provides a target pension income for life and a lump sum at retirement, funded by fixed contributions from members and the employer. Benefits can be increased or reduced in line with the scheme's funding position and long-term return assumptions.

As of 2025, the Royal Mail plan remains the only CDC scheme authorised in the UK, although government policy is to broaden the framework. In 2025 the Department for Work and Pensions confirmed plans and draft regulations to enable unconnected multi-employer CDC schemes from 2026 and consulted on retirement-only "decumulation CDC" schemes that would accept transfers from standard defined contribution arrangements at or near retirement.

=== Other countries ===
Outside these countries, few CDC schemes have been implemented. In Canada a number of "shared-risk" and target-benefit plans operate in some provinces and sectors, pooling investment and longevity risks between members and allowing benefits to be adjusted when funding falls short of target. The federal government has consulted on a target-benefit framework for federally regulated plans that would sit between traditional defined benefit and defined contribution designs.

== See also ==
- Target benefit plan
- Defined contribution pension
- Defined benefit pension plan
- Tontine
