= Bankruptcy Code =

Bankruptcy Code may refer to:

- Bankruptcy in Canada
- Bankruptcy in China
- Bankruptcy in the United States or Title 11 of the United States Code (a.k.a. the "Bankruptcy Code")
- Bankruptcy in the United Kingdom
- Insolvency and Bankruptcy Code, an Act made by Parliament of India which governs law related to bankruptcy and insolvency.

== See also ==
- Bankruptcy
