= Jeremy Gold =

American economist

Jeremy Edward Gold (November 28, 1942 – July 6, 2018) was an American actuary and economist. He was noted for his advocacy of the application of financial economics to pension actuarial practice and his criticism of actuarial standards and professionalism.

== Biography ==
Gold was born on November 28, 1942, in Brooklyn, New York, to Sarah and Edward Gold, both high-school English teachers. He grew up on the Lower East Side of Manhattan. After graduating from Stuyvesant High School at age 16, he was accepted at the Massachusetts Institute of Technology, where he studied mathematics. After three years, he dropped out with failing grades to play pool and drive across the United States. Eventually, he earned a bachelor's degree from Pace College (now known as Pace University) in 1969.

Gold became a pension actuary and worked for twenty years at Alexander & Alexander (later acquired by Aon) and Buck Consultants. In the 1980s, he became one of the first actuaries to work on Wall Street when he went to work at Morgan Stanley. At the time, many large businesses had become the targets of corporate raids and leveraged buyouts because, the bankers said, their pension plans had accumulated more funds than they needed. After a buyout, the buyer would take the "excess assets" out of the pension plan.

Gold began to wonder how the plans had built up such big surpluses. Every pension plan had an actuary who calculated its annual contribution. He started to ask whether the advice pension actuaries were giving their clients was appropriate. He noticed that the principles of financial economics, in which the cost of a transaction to the buyer and the seller are carefully measured and tracked, were being applied to many areas of finance—except pension plans. Bankers were measuring pension liabilities using financial economic tools, but actuaries were measuring them using tools that had been developed decades earlier, and they seemed unconcerned about swings in asset values and interest rates.

This prompted Gold to return to school. In 1995, at the age of 53, he enrolled at the Wharton School with the aim of (in his words) "improving pension actuarial practice through research and intelligent criticism". In 2000, with his newly earned doctorate, he became an outspoken advocate for pension actuaries to adopt a model driven by financial economics. He also pushed for the actuarial profession to improve its professionalism and write stricter standards of practice.

Pension actuaries and companies and governments that sponsor pension plans had mixed reactions to Gold. Slowly, however, his ideas have gained influence. Moody's Investors Service announced in 2013 that it would no longer use actuaries' calculations of pension liabilities for government-sponsored pension plans but would instead calculate the obligations themselves. The Governmental Accounting Standards Board, which dictates how governmental bodies account for expenses, began requiring the use of a more market-based interest rates to measure pension liabilities. The Actuarial Standards Board, which sets the rules by which actuaries perform their jobs, has slowly begun to move in his direction as well.

Gold died on July 6, 2018, of myelodysplastic syndrome and leukemia. He was 75 years old.

== See also ==
- Pensions crisis
