= Portability (social security) =

The portability of social security benefits is the ability of workers to preserve, maintain, and transfer acquired social security rights and social security rights in the process of being acquired from one private, occupational, or public social security scheme to another. Social security rights refer to rights stemming from pension schemes (old age, survivor, disability), unemployment insurance, health insurance, workers' compensation, and sickness benefits.

Hence, if social security benefits are portable, contributors to, for example, old-age pension schemes do not experience any disadvantage such as the loss of contributions and benefits associated with these contributions when moving from one job to another, from one occupation to another, or from the public to the private sector or vice versa.

International portability of social security rights allows international migrants, who have contributed to a social security scheme for some time in a particular country, to maintain acquired benefits or benefits in the process of being acquired when moving to another country. International portability of social security benefits is therefore understood as the migrant's ability to preserve, maintain, and transfer acquired social security rights independent of nationality and country of residence.

International portability of social security benefits is achieved through bilateral or multilateral social security agreements between countries. These agreements guarantee the totalization of periods of contribution to the social security systems of both countries and the extraterritorial payment of benefits. Currently it is estimated that approximately 23 per cent of migrants worldwide are covered by bilateral social security agreements.
