= Target benefit plan =

A target benefit plan is a type of pension plan that is similar to a defined contribution plan in that it involves fixed contributions, or a fixed range of contributions, which are set independently of a plan's funded position. Benefits are based on affordability projections. Plan members share plan risk through adjustments to their benefits.

A key element of the target benefit model is the existence of pre-determined guidelines linking benefits to funds available in the plan. Benefits and contributions are linked in a way that does not exist with traditional defined benefit or defined contribution plans.

== Description ==
Target benefit plans are similar to defined benefit plans in that the annual contribution is determined by a formula to calculate the amount needed each year to accumulate (at an assumed interest rate) a fund sufficient to pay a projected retirement benefit, the target benefit, to each participant upon reaching retirement. It is similar to a defined contribution plan in that the plan does not guarantee any benefit will be paid. The plan's only obligation is to pay whatever benefit can be provided by the amount in the contributor's account. The actual earnings on the individual accounts may differ from the estimated earnings used in the assumptions and the investment performance of that account through the years.

=== Advantages ===
For pension plan sponsors, target benefits plan provide more flexibility than traditional defined benefit or defined contribution plans. Defined benefit plans provide a high degree of benefit certainty for members, but for plan sponsors contribution rates are more uncertain and funding costs can be high. Defined benefit plans can also contribute to intergeneration inequality, as retired members continue to receive benefits, whether or not those benefits were adequately pre-funded. The reverse is true for defined contribution plans where the contribution certainty comes at the cost of complete benefit uncertainty.

== Canada ==
The target benefit model is growing in Canada. Only the province of New Brunswick has the full legislative structure required to operate target benefit plans, which in that province are called shared-risk pension plans. Several other provinces including Ontario, Quebec, Nova Scotia, Saskatchewan, British Columbia and Alberta have introduced legislation allowing for target benefit plans, but are waiting for the establishment of a regulatory regime that would outline the specific rules governing this type of pension plan.

In 2016, Federal Finance Minister Bill Morneau introduced Bill C-27, a new piece of federal legislation that enables Crown corporations and federal private-sector employers to establish target-benefit plans. Major Canadian unions expressed their opposition to the legislation on the grounds that it would undermine the worker security of defined-benefit plans, contrary to the government's election commitments to strengthen retirement security. The bill later became controversial because it became known that Morneau still had substantial holdings in Morneau Shapell, which he had led in his prior career. While leading Morneau Shapell, Morneau had advocated for such plans, and the firm had worked with the government of New Brunswick to establish target-benefit plans and stood to gain from similar consulting work under the legislation.

== See also ==
- 401(k)
- Individual Retirement Account
- Retirement plan
- Risk Sharing Pensions
- Target date fund
- Tontines
