= Bankruptcy in China =

The Enterprise Bankruptcy Law of the People's Republic of China (trial Implementation) was first passed in 1986. On 1 June 2007, the new Enterprise Bankruptcy Law of the PRC came into force. It contains 136 articles, almost 100 more than the 1986 law it replaced, and consequently it is thought to be more complete legally.

The Enterprise Bankruptcy Law of the PRC was adopted on August 27, 2006, and became effective since June 1, 2007.

Personal bankruptcy laws only exist in Hong Kong and Shenzhen.

The Enterprise Bankruptcy Law of the PRC 2007 applies only to the mainland of China. Due to the "one country, two systems" policy of the PRC, different laws and regulations regarding to bankruptcy apply in Hong Kong and Macau.
