= Pension systems by country =

The table below shows the pension systems pillars by country.

Pension systems by country
Country	Pillar 0	Pillar 1	Pillar 2	Pillar 3
Afghanistan	No	Social insurance system	N/A	N/A
Algeria	Social assistance	Social insurance system	N/A	N/A
Argentina	Basic pension	Social insurance system	No, closed in 2008	N/A
Armenia	Social assistance	Social insurance system	Mandatory individual accounts	Voluntary pensions
Australia	Social assistance	Mandatory occupational pension system	N/A	N/A
Austria	No	Social insurance system	Occupational pensions	Private pensions
Bahrain	No	Social insurance system	N/A	N/A
Bangladesh	Social assistance	N/A	N/A	N/A
Belarus	Social assistance	Social insurance system	N/A	N/A
Belgium	Social assistance	Social insurance system	N/A	N/A
Bhutan	No	Provident fund system	No	N/A
Botswana	Basic pension	No	No	N/A
Brazil	Social assistance	Social insurance system	N/A	N/A
Brunei	Basic pension	Provident fund system	Supplementary individual account	N/A
Bulgaria	Social assistance	Social insurance system	Individual accounts	N/A
Burkina Faso	No	Social insurance system	N/A	N/A
Burundi	No	Social insurance system	N/A	N/A
Cameroon	No	Social insurance system	N/A	N/A
Canada	Basic pension	Canada Pension Plan	N/A	Registered retirement savings plan
China	Social assistance	Social insurance system	Mandatory individual accounts	N/A
Czech Republic	Basic pension	Social insurance system	No, canceled in 2016	Voluntary individual accounts
Dominican Republic	Social assistance	Mandatory individual accounts	N/A	N/A
El Salvador	Social assistance	Mandatory individual accounts	N/A	N/A
Estonia	Social assistance	Social insurance system	Mandatory individual accounts	Voluntary individual accounts
Eswatini	Social assistance	Provident fund system	N/A	N/A
France	Social assistance	Social insurance system	Mandatory occupational pension provision	Voluntary private collective pension provision; Voluntary private individual pension provision
Georgia	Basic pension	N/A	N/A	N/A
Germany	Social assistance	Social insurance system	Voluntary occupational pension insurance	Private pension schemes
Hong Kong	Basic pension	Provident fund system	N/A	N/A
Hungary	Social assistance	Private pension fund	Voluntary pension fund	N/A
India	Social assistance	Employees’ Provident Fund	Voluntary pension insurance	Individual private pension plans
Ireland	Basic pension	Social insurance system Pay Related Social Insurance	Occupational pension schemes	N/A
Italy	Social assistance	Notional defined contributions	N/A	N/A
Japan	N/A	N/A	N/A	N/A
Jordan	No	Social insurance system	N/A	N/A
Kazakhstan	Basic pension	Mandatory individual accounts	N/A	N/A
Kenya	Older Persons Cash Transfer	Mandatory individual accounts	No	N/A
Kyrgyzstan	Social assistance	Notional defined contributions	No	N/A
Latvia	Social assistance	Notional defined contributions	Mandatory individual accounts	Voluntary individual accounts
Lithuania	Social assistance	Social insurance system	Voluntary pension fund	Voluntary individual accounts
Luxembourg	No	Social insurance system	Mandatory occupational pension provision	Voluntary pensions funds and endowment policy insurances with tax benefits
Malawi	no	Mandatory individual accounts	N/A	N/A
Malaysia	Social assistance	Provident Fund System (KWSP) or Individual pension account (KWAP/LTAT)	Provident Fund System	Voluntary individual accounts: i-Saraan voluntary Provident Fund System
Mexico	Social assistance	Mandatory individual accounts	N/A	N/A
Monaco	No	Social insurance system	No	N/A
Mongolia	Social assistance	Notional defined contributions	N/A	N/A
Morocco	No	Social insurance system	N/A	N/A
Mozambique	Social assistance	Social insurance system	N/A	N/A
Namibia	Social assistance	Social insurance system	N/A	N/A
Nepal	Social assistance	Provident fund system	N/A	N/A
Netherlands	Social assistance	Social insurance system	Private employee pensions	Individual private pensions
New Zealand	Basic pension	Individual accounts	N/A	N/A
Nigeria	No	Mandatory individual accounts	No	N/A
North Korea	N/A	N/A	N/A	N/A
Norway	Basic pension	Notional defined contributions	Occupational pension schemes	Individual pensions
Oman	No	Social insurance system	N/A	N/A
Pakistan	No	Social insurance system	N/A	N/A
Papua New Guinea	No	Mandatory occupational retirement system	N/A	N/A
Philippines	Social assistance	Social insurance system	N/A	N/A
Poland	Basic pensions for mothers of four or more children from March 2019	Notional defined contributions	Voluntary Open Pension Funds (OFE)	Voluntary individual accounts: Occupational Pension Programs (PPE); Individual Pension Accounts (IKE/IKZE); Employee Capital Plans (PPK)
Portugal	Social assistance	Social insurance system	N/A	N/A
Qatar	No	Social insurance system	N/A	N/A
Romania	No	Social insurance system	Mandatory individual accounts	Voluntary individual accounts
Russia	Basic pension	Social insurance system	Mandatory pension funds	Voluntary private pension funds
Rwanda	No	Social insurance system	N/A	N/A
Saudi Arabia	No	Social insurance system	N/A	N/A
Senegal	No	Social insurance system	N/A	N/A
Sierra Leone	No	Social insurance system	N/A	N/A
Singapore	Social assistance	Provident fund system	N/A	N/A
Slovakia	Basic pension	Social insurance system	Voluntary individual accounts	N/A
Slovenia	Social assistance	Social insurance system	N/A	N/A
Solomon Islands	No	Provident fund system	N/A	N/A
South Africa	Basic pension	N/A	N/A	N/A
South Korea	Social assistance	Social insurance system	N/A	N/A
South Sudan	No	No	No	N/A
Spain	Social assistance	Social insurance system	N/A	N/A
Sri Lanka	No	Provident fund system	Supplementary fund	N/A
Sudan	No	Social insurance system	N/A	N/A
Sweden	Basic pension	Notional defined contributions	Mandatory individual accounts	N/A
Switzerland	N/A	Social insurance system	Mandatory occupational pension system	Voluntary pensions funds and endowment policy insurances with tax benefits
Syria	N/A	N/A	N/A	N/A
Taiwan	Social assistance	Social insurance system	Mandatory individual accounts	N/A
Tanzania	No	Social insurance system	N/A	N/A
Thailand	Social assistance	Social insurance system	Voluntary national savings fund	N/A
Turkey	Social assistance	Social insurance system	N/A	N/A
Turkmenistan	Social assistance	Notional defined contributions	N/A	N/A
Uganda	No	Provident fund system	N/A	N/A
Ukraine	Social assistance	Social insurance system	Mandatory state pension fund	Voluntary individual pensions
United Arab Emirates	No	Social insurance system	N/A	N/A
United Kingdom	Basic pension	Social insurance system	Occupational schemes	Voluntary individual pensions: Stakeholder pensions; Group personal pensions; Self-invested personal pensions
United States	Social assistance	Social insurance system	N/A	N/A
Uruguay	Social assistance	Social insurance system	Mandatory individual accounts	N/A
Uzbekistan	Social assistance	Mandatory individual accounts	N/A	N/A
Venezuela	Social assistance	Social insurance system	N/A	N/A
Vietnam	Social assistance	Social insurance system	N/A	N/A
Zambia	No	Social insurance system	N/A	N/A
Zimbabwe	No	Social insurance system	N/A	N/A

First pillar of pension system by country: Basic non-contributory pension Mandatory individual accounts Provident fund system Workers can switch between social insurance system or individual accounts Social insurance system

== Funded and pay-as-you-go shares by country ==
Pension entitlements by funding type in % of total in year 2021.

Country	Private	Funded	Pay-as-you-go
Austria	3	15	83
Belgium	8	17	75
Bulgaria	7	0	93
Croatia	9	0	91
Cyprus	4	13	83
Czech Republic	3	0	97
Denmark	73	25	2
Estonia	0	3	97
Finland	1	0	99
France	0	13	87
Germany	7	14	79
Greece	1	0	99
Hungary	0	0	100
Iceland	54	14	33
Ireland	16	23	61
Italy	2	0	98
Latvia	8	3	90
Lithuania	4	2	95
Luxembourg	2	17	81
Malta	0	7	93
Netherlands	36	14	51
Norway	8	11	81
Poland	3	8	90
Portugal	3	25	72
Romania	2	0	98
Slovakia	5	14	81
Slovenia	1	0	98
Spain	1	9	90
Sweden	33	5	62
Switzerland	34	5	62

== Notable examples of pension systems by country ==
Some of the listed systems might also be considered social insurance.

- Argentina – Administración Nacional de la Seguridad Social
- Armenia – Pensions in Armenia
- Australia:
  - Superannuation in Australia – Private, and compulsory, individual retirement contribution system.
  - Social Security – Public pensions
- Austria – Pensions in Austria
- Canada:
  - Canada Pension Plan
  - Old Age Security
  - Quebec Pension Plan
  - Registered retirement savings plan
  - Saskatchewan Pension Plan
- Finland – Kansaneläkelaitos
- France:
  - Pensions in France
  - Allocation de Solidarité aux Personnes Agées
  - Pensions Reserve Fund (France)
- Hong Kong:
  - Mandatory Provident Fund (MPF Schemes)
  - Occupational Retirement Schemes (ORSO Schemes)
- India:
  - Pensions in India
  - National Pension System
  - Employees' Provident Fund Organisation of India
- Iranian Social Security Civil Servants Pension Fund
- Japan – National Pension
- Malaysia:
  - Employees Provident Fund – Private voluntary retirement contribution system
  - Retirement Fund – Public pensions
  - Armed Forces Fund Board – Military pensions
- Mexico – Mexico Pension Plan
- Netherlands – Algemene Ouderdomswet
- New Zealand:
  - New Zealand superannuation – public pensions
  - KiwiSaver – Private voluntary retirement contribution system
- Poland – Social Insurance Institution
- Singapore – Central Provident Fund
- South Korea – National Pension Service
- Sri Lanka – Employees' Provident Fund (Sri Lanka) and Employees' Trust Fund
- Sweden – Social security in Sweden
- Switzerland – Pension system in Switzerland
- United Kingdom:
  - Pensions in the United Kingdom
  - Self-invested personal pensions
- United States:
  - Public employee pensions
  - Retirement plans in the United States
  - Social Security
- Vanuatu – Vanuatu National Provident Fund

== See also ==
- Occupational pension funds in the EU
- Retirement age by country and region
