= Occupational pension funds in the EU =

Retirement fund from one's employer in the European Union

An occupational pension fund, also referred to as an employer-funded or employer-administered scheme, is a pension offered by an employer to an employee's retirement scheme. Within the European Union (EU), these pension funds can vary throughout certain Member States due to differences in retirement ages in Europe, salaries and length of careers, labour and tax laws, and phases of reform.

This form deferred compensation can be paid out regularly each month once the employee has retired. It is both beneficial for the employee by saving on taxation and social insurance payments and the employer to attract potential employees and to retain existing as an incentive. It is known as the “second pillar” of a supplementary pension plan which includes the contribution of employers. This free movement of workers in the EU allows them to uphold their rights when moving to other Member States.

== Background ==
Since prior to the post-World War II period, European countries embraced a Bismarckian pension system, first introduced in Germany, which allowed retirees to receive benefits from current workers. However, after this period nearly all of Europe had experienced a dramatic increase in life expectancy yet with a decreasing rate of fertility. Since the 1990s, European countries have made attempts to improve their pension systems through various multi-tier pension systems. This typically involved utilizing a combination of mandatory and voluntary schemes where both individuals and the government collectively put money into the system.

In 2003, the European Commission created the International Occupational Pension Funds Directive (also referred to as the IORP Directive) to establish the fundamental requirements of offering occupational pension funds and its regulations. However, the IORP was since revised in 2016 in response to financial crisis since 2008. In addition, pension funds have become one of the EU's largest expenditures due to increasing pressures from the aging population throughout Europe. In 2011, the European Parliament called upon the Commission to encouraged more Member States to implement occupational pensions for a mix of both public (‘first pillar’) and private (‘second pillar’) pensions as another step to reform schemes for a more sustainable future. However, the current establishment of occupational pension funds still vary in size and approach across each Member State.

Despite the various designs, occupational pension plans can be defined into two basic types:

1. Defined benefit (‘DB’) in which the employee benefit received is calculated through the length of employment under the employer and the specified salary maintained.
2. Defined contribution (‘DC’) where both the employee and employer generate regular contributions into an account. This type of plan is fully funded and are essentially accounts which experience tax-differed savings.

== Reforms and Role of the EU ==
Since the early 2000s, numerous EU Member States have initiated pension reforms through the adjustment of age requirements and benefits received. These changes were a response to pressures from declining birth rates, increased life expectancies, and aging demographics. With the 2004 enlargement of the EU, ‘new’ Member States faced challenges to reform their previous pension systems to a market-based from the socialist system. However, smaller ‘new’ EU Member states, such as Cyprus and Slovenia, began to adopt mandatory occupational pension schemes. The reform changes made were through toughening conditions of eligibility for earlier retirement age, lessening public pension benefits received, and raising the age of retirement.

In correspondence with the principle of subsidiarity, Member States were capable to reform and design their new pension systems. Private pension funds had become a cornerstone part of the EU programme.

=== The International Occupational Pension Funds Directive (IORP) ===
The International Occupational Pension Funds Directive was formulated to enhance EU pension funds to meet certain standards regarding financial aspects of occupational pension schemes. The revision of this framework for supplementary pension mobility encouraged the enactment of occupational pension funds through long-term investment. Below the revision's goals included but not limited to:

1. Proper investment requirements to ensure sufficient funds.
2. Better transparency to each Member State and beneficiary through statements regarding funds received to be properly informed of rights.
3. Elimination of restrictions on occupational pension funds which operate cross borders.

Through the revision, however, it still provides a general framework which is not required to be implemented by all EU Member States. Yet overall, the aim was to guide each institution into harmonization towards cross-border activity. The need for the revisions can be attributed towards the pressure for needing to have more retirement savings and occupational pensions due to aging populations and decline in fertility.

== European Integration ==
One goal of the European Union can be described as creating an intra-European migration and eliminating restrictions on the mobility of workers. With this goal, originally regulations of pensions schemes were necessary to foster direct and positive integration. In 1998, the EU further became interested in regulations for occupational (supplementary) pension schemes with the Council Directive (98/49) which established principles to safeguard the pension rights of the movement of EU national workers, maintain equal treatment of EU nationals, and transfer benefits to other Member States.

The European Commission is actively involved to area relating to occupational pension schemes in the EU. The DG Internal Market and Service was established to promote the internal market by facilitating cross-border cooperation in the EU with a basis of rules to follow by.

== Effects from global financial and economic crisis ==
The global financial and economic crises following the 2008 Lehman Brothers collapse enacted budgetary restrictions in the EU and created vulnerabilities for the pension systems across Member States. Both DB and DC plans were significantly affected by the 2008 crisis. On average, throughout countries in the EU with DB plans experienced at least a 10% decrease in benefit cuts. This showed that fully funded pension schemes could not entirely provide a reliable basis for benefits received after retirement. Furthermore, during that time with the increase of unemployment made saving for retirement and receiving occupational pension funds more difficult.

Workers who were nearby their retirement appeared to be affected as well by the crisis.

== See also ==
- Pensions in the United Kingdom
- Pensions in Germany
- Pensions in France
- Pensions in the Czech Republic
