= Retirement age =

Age at which a person expects or requires to retire

Average effective age of retirement for men, 1970 to 2018 (Our World in Data)

This article lists the statutory retirement age in different countries. In some contexts, the retirement age is the age at which a person is expected or required to cease work. It is usually the age at which such a person may be entitled to receive superannuation or other government benefits, like a state pension.

== History and establishment ==
The first recorded use of a state pension was established in the Roman Empire in 13 BC by Augustus for military veterans who had served for at least 16 years in a legion and four years in the reserves. This was later increased to 20 years in a legion and five years in the reserves.

The first retirement age was set in Germany by Otto von Bismarck in 1889 (Gesetz, betreffend die Invaliditäts- und Altersversicherung), originally at 70, before being reduced to 65 in 1916 (Gesetz, betreffend Renten in der Invalidenversicherung). Following this, more countries began to adopt an official retirement age, such as Britain with the passage of the Old Age Pensions Act 1908, which set the initial retirement age at 70 before it was reduced to 65 for men and 60 for women with the passage of the National Insurance Act 1946.

The United States adopted an initial retirement age of 65, under the bill of the Social Security Act of 1935. By the mid-20th century, almost all countries had adopted a retirement age.

== Arguments ==
Policymakers usually consider the demography, fiscal cost of aging, health, life expectancy, nature of the profession, supply of labor force, and more, while taking the retirement age into account. The increase in life expectancy is used in some jurisdictions as an argument to increase the age of retirement in the 21st century.

Arguments for lower retirement ages for parents include the unpaid work of parental care. Lower retirement ages for parents have been criticized for reducing the length of pension contributions, which can result in lower retirement benefits.

Actuarially neutral adjustment of pension benefits allows a flexible retirement age without reducing pension sustainability.

Some countries are equalizing the retirement ages between women and men. The expected years in retirement were 22.8 years for women and 18.4 years for men on average in OECD in 2022, contributed by sex differences in life expectancy. The generally longer expected years in retirement result in women requiring higher pension contributions to reach the same annual pension benefits as men without redistribution.

== Reforms ==
Reforms tend to be phased in slowly when the retirement age (or pension age) is increased with grandfathering, ensuring a gradual change. One of such examples of grandfathering is the transitional pension rules, which were applied for staff aged 54 years or older, and to some extent, for all staff in place, when in 2014, the retirement age of European civil servants was increased to 66 years of age.

In contrast, when the age of retirement is decreased, changes are often brought about rapidly.

== Retirement age by country and region ==
Many of the countries listed in the table below are in the process of reforming retirement ages. The actual retirement can be earlier or later than the public retirement age due to private pension plans or incentives to work longer.

In some countries, one's year of birth determines their age of retirement. For example, in the United States as of 2025, while a person born before 1960 can retire with social security benefits at the age of 66, those born after 1960 must be 67, however an added increase can be obtained by retiring after 70.

Denmark, whose currently age for retirees is 67, (men and women) will also be increased to 70 by 2040.

Many European Union Member States, currently imply a retirement age of 65, in the 2020s. However by 2030 this will be increased to the standard 67 years in most countries.

The average of statutory retirement age in the 34 countries of the Organisation for Economic Co-operation and Development (OECD) in 2014 was males 65 years and females 63.5 years, but the tendency all over the world is to increase the retirement age. This is also reflected by the findings that just over half the Asian investors surveyed region-wide said they agreed with raising the retirement age, with a quarter disagreeing and the remainder undecided.

Retirement age
Country	Men	Women	Year	Notes	Ref
Albania	65	62	2026	Men: gradually rising by 1 month a year from 2033 onwards from 65 years to 67 years by 2056. Women: gradually rising by 2 months a year from 2021 onwards from 61 years to 67 years by 2056.	
Argentina	65	60	2026		
Armenia	63		2026		
Australia	67		2026	In Australia the retirement age was increased to 67 years in July 2023.	
Austria	65	61.5	2026	Women: gradually rising by 6 months per year from 2024 onwards from 60 years to 65 years by 2033.	
Azerbaijan	65	64.5	2026	Men: 65 from 2021 onwards. Women: gradually rising by 6 months per year from 2017 onwards from 60 to 65 years by 2027.	
Belarus	63	58	2026		
Bangladesh	59		2026		
Belgium	66-67		2026	The legal retirement age (the age at which one can retire, regardless of career length) in Belgium is 66 from 2025 and in 2030 it will be 67, both for women and men. Early retirement is possible from 60 onwards with a career of at least 44 years, from 61 onwards with at least 43 years, or from 63 onwards with a career of at least 42 years. Some exceptions exist, mainly in the required number of years. A career year is considered if it contains at least 156 days (in full time equivalent).	
Bosnia and Herzegovina	65		2026		
Brazil	65	62	2026	Certain individuals, such as rural workers, teachers and police officers, have a lower minimum age. Brazil also requires workers to have contributed to social security for a minimum amount of time before they become eligible to claim benefits. To start receiving partial benefits, all private-sector workers are required have contributed for at least 20 years (for men) or 15 years (for women). Public-sector workers are required to have contributed for at least 25 years. To receive full benefits all workers must have contributed for at least 40 years (for men) or 35 years (for women).	
British Virgin Islands	65		2026		
Bulgaria	64 years 9 months	62 years 3 months	2026	In Bulgaria the retirement age is to be increased gradually and reach 65 years by 2029 for men and by 2037 for women.	
Cameroon	60		2026	Since 2023 the retirement age is 60 years for all.	
Canada	65 (standard); 60 (on deduction, up to 36%); 70 (increase of up to 42%)		2026	The standard age to start the pension is 65. However, you can start receiving it as early as age 60 or as late as age 70. If you start receiving your pension earlier, the monthly amount you’ll receive will be smaller. If you decide to start later, you’ll receive a larger monthly amount. There’s no benefit to wait after age 70 to start receiving the pension. The maximum monthly amount you can receive is reached when you turn 70. If you start before age 65, payments will decrease by 0.6% each month (or by 7.2% per year), up to a maximum reduction of 36% if you start at age 60. If you start after age 65, payments will increase by 0.7% each month (or by 8.4% per year), up to a maximum increase of 42% if you start at age 70 (or after).	
Chile	65	60	2026		
China	63 (target)	55–58 (targets)	From 2025	The new retirement age was announced on 13 September 2024 and is being gradually raised to 63 for men, 58 for female civil servants and 55 for female workers. The increases began on 1 January 2025 and are being phased in over 15 years. Previously, the retirement age was 60 for men, 55 for female civil servants, and 50 for female workers. The 2024 change marked the first increase of the retirement age since the 1950s. The retirement age will apply to men born in and after 1965, female civil servants born in and after 1970 and female workers born in or after 1975. The retirement age increase is based on the individual’s year and month of birth, as it increases by 1 month for every 4-month-block months of birth for males and female civil servants and 1 month for every 2-month-block for female workers until 2040. It is expected to be fully phased in for male workers born in September 1976, female civil servants born in September 1981 and female workers born in November 1984. The New regulation also stipulates that those affected by the change may voluntarily reduce their retirement age by up to 3 years if they have made the minimum length of pension payments, or delay their retirements by up to 3 years if permitted by the employer. The minimum pension payment period will also be increased from 15 years to 20 from 2030.	
Colombia	62	57	2026	The reform, which will be in force from July 2025, kept the retirement age at 62 for men when they have made contributions for 1,300 weeks of work and 57 for women, though it reduced the number of weeks for women to 1,000. Women can discount 50 weeks of pension contributions from their required amount for each child, for up to three children, under the terms of the reform.	
Croatia	65	64	2026	Men: 65. Women: gradually rising by 3 months per year to 65 years by 2030.	
Cuba	65	60	2026	Age 65 (men) or age 60 (women) with at least 30 years of employment; age 60 (men) or age 55 (women) if 75% of the insured's total employment history or the 15 years of employment immediately before retirement involved arduous or dangerous work.	
Cyprus	65		2026	The pensionable age is 65. It is possible to receive a pension at the age of 63 under certain conditions. Miners can receive a pension at the age of 63 provided they have worked in a mine for at least 3 years; and they are entitled to a one-month reduction in the retirement age for every 5-month period they worked in a mine on condition that they are no longer engaged in that activity. They may not, however, retire before the age of 58. Cypriot legislation does not provide for early retirement in other cases.	
Czech Republic	64 years 4 months		2026	By 2030 the retirement age will be 65. For women, having children reduce the retirement age depending on number of children; from 2037 the retirement age will be 65 for all, regardless of number of children.	
Denmark	67–70		2026	See also: Pensions in Denmark From 2030 onwards, retirement age will be linked to life expectancy. From 2040 to 2045 the state retirement age was set to 70.	
Egypt	60		2026		
Estonia	64 years 11 months		2026	By 2027, retirement age will be linked to the average life expectancy. Having children may reduce the retirement age by 3–5 years.	
Finland	64–69		2026	Flexible retirement age: 64–69 years, national pension 65 years. In 2030, the retirement age will be linked to life expectancy.	
France	64–67		2026	See also: Pensions in France	
Georgia	65	60	2026		
Germany	65 years 4 months		2026	In Germany the retirement age is being increased and will gradually rise to 67 by 2031.	
Greece	67		2026		
Hong Kong	60–65		2026	Retirement age 65. Early retirement possible between the ages of 60 and 64. Some disciplined services staff of the government have lower retirement age.	
Hungary	65		2026	Women with 40 years of insurance can retire at any age.	
Iceland	67		2026		
India	60–65		2026	In the public sector, the retirement age is 60, 62 in Indian Railways, 62 for the chiefs of army/navy/air force staff (or 3 years of service whichever is earlier), 62 for high court judges, 65 for the chief of defence staff (or 3 years of service whichever is earlier), and 65 for supreme Court judges. while in the private sector it depends on the individual company and the maximum being 65.	
Indonesia	59 years 4 months		2026	In Indonesia, provisions relating to pensions are regulated in Government Regulation Number 45 of 2015 Article 15 concerning the Implementation of the Pension Guarantee Program, in PP 45/2015 the following matters are regulated: For the first time the Retirement Age is set at 56 (fifty six years). Starting January 1, 2019, the retirement age as referred to in paragraph (1) will be 57 (fifty seven) years. The Retirement Age as referred to in paragraph (2) is further increased by 1 (one) year for every subsequent 3 (three) years until it reaches the Retirement Age of 65 (sixty five) years. By referring to the regulation, the retirement age limit in Indonesia is 58 years in 2022 and will reach the maximum retirement age limit, which is 65 years in 2043.	
Iran	60	55	2026		
Iraq	60		2026		
Ireland	67 years 6 months		2026	In Ireland the retirement age is to be increased gradually and reach 68 years by 2028.	
Israel	67	64	2026	In Israel the retirement age for women is to be increased gradually and reach 65 by 2032.	
Italy	62–67		2026	Must have paid contributions for at least 20 years (At 67 years and 3 months). Those who have paid contributions for at least 41 years can retire at 62. Those who have paid contributions for at least 41 years and 10 months (women) or 42 years and 10 months (men) can retire regardless of age.	
Japan	65		2026	See also: Pensions in Japan and Elderly people in Japan	
Kazakhstan	63	62 years 6 months	2026	From 2017 the retirement age for women is to be increased gradually and reach 63 years in 2027	
Kosovo	65	65	2026		
Kyrgyzstan	63	58	2026		
Latvia	65		2026		
Lebanon	64	64	2023		
Libya	65	60	2026		
Liechtenstein	64		2026		
Lithuania	65		2026		
Luxembourg	65		2026		
Malaysia	60		2026	In Malaysia, The Congress of Unions of Employees in the Public and Civil Services (Cuepacs) wants the government to consider extending the retirement age for civil servants from 60 to 62, but the government has no immediate plan to extend it as the current retirement age is deemed as sufficient.	
Malta	64 years 8 months		2026	In Malta the retirement age is being increased gradually to 65 years by 2027.	
Mauritius	60 years 6 months		2026	In Mauritius the retirement age is being increased gradually to 65 years by 2034.	
Mexico	65		2026	Retirement age is expected to be increased in the coming years.	
Moldova	63	62	2026	Women: gradually rising by 6 months per year until 63 years in 2028.	
Montenegro	66	64	2026		
Morocco	63		2026		
Namibia	55–60		2026	The early retirement age for public employees is 55 years	
Nepal	65		2026		
Netherlands	67		2026	67 to be increased to 67 years 3 months in 2028. AOW (Algemene Ouderdomswet, meaning General Old Age Law) eligibility is tied to life expectancy.	
New Zealand	65		2026		
North Korea	60	55	2026		
North Macedonia	64	62	2026		
Norway	62–67		2026	See also: Pensions in Norway The general retirement age is currently set to age 67 however, given sufficient pension contributions it is possible to retire as early as at age 62. The longer an individual postpones withdrawing a pension, the greater the government pension provision becomes.	
Oman	60	55	2026		
Pakistan	60		2026		
Peru	60		2026		
Philippines	60		2026	The retirement age for an employee depends on the employment contract. Upon retirement, the retired employee should be given his/her benefits according to the agreement or contract between the employer and the employee. However, if there is no existing retirement plan or agreement for the employee, he/she may retire at the age of 60, given that he/she has served the employer for 5 years, and shall be given a retirement pay of at least half a month's salary for every year of service (6 months of work given is considered as 1 whole year for the retirement pay).	
Poland	65	60	2026		
Portugal	66 years 8 months		2026		
Romania	65	62 years 4 months	2023	The age for women is being increased gradually. It will reach 63 by 2030, 64 in 2033 and 65 in 2035, and then will be linked to life expectancy.	
Russia	64 years 6 months	59 years 6 months	2026	From 2019 the retirement age for men (women) would gradually increase from 60 (55) to 65 (60) years by 2028; first it was intended to hike the age for women to 63 but later the plan was softened.	
Saudi Arabia	60		2026	In Saudi Arabia, the retirement age is based on the Hijiri (lunar) calendar.	
Serbia	65	64	2026	Both men and women can retire when they reach their respective retirement age and have at least 15 years of insurance coverage. Or, have 45 years of insurance coverage regardless of age. The retirement age for women is increased by 2 months every year and it will be the same as for men, 65 in 2032.	
Singapore	62 years 4 months – 68 years		2026	In Singapore, the Retirement Age Act (RAA) has been replaced by the Retirement and Re-employment Act (RRA) in 2012. Under the RRA, the statutory minimum retirement age is still 62, but employers are now required to offer re-employment to eligible employees who turn 62, up to the age of 65. The bill will gradually increase the retirement and re-employment ages for Singapore employees to 65 and 70 years old, respectively. By 2030, the retirement age will have been increased to 65 and the re-employment age will have been raised to 70, in a step-by-step approach.	
Slovakia	62		2026	In Slovakia the retirement age for women depends on the number of children. The retirement age will be equalized for men and women at 62 in 2017. The retirement age as of October 2022 is 63 years with the conditions.	
Slovenia	65–67		2026	The reform was adopted in November 2025 and entered into force on 1 January 2026. The age limit is gradually increasing for both sexes until 2035.	
South Korea	60		2026		
Spain	66 years 10 months		2026	See also: Pensions in Spain The age will be 67 by 2027.	
Sri Lanka	55		2026		
Sweden	64–67		2026	Early retirement possible from 64. Persons born before 1963 have various lower retirement ages.	
Switzerland	65		2026		
Tajikistan	63	58	2026		
Thailand	60		2026	except a president of a university can work beyond 60 years	
Trinidad and Tobago	60–65		2026		
Tunisia	62–65		2026		
Turkmenistan	62	57	2026		
Turkey	62	60 years 6 months	2026	Retirement age was gradually increased since the 1970s, from 44 for men and 38 for women. Originally, there was no exact retirement age. Current ages will increase to 65 for both genders by 2048. Additionally, various minimum days of service is required, which is currently 7000 days. It will become 7200 days (20 years) by 2048. One is subject to the laws on the day he/she started working.	
Ukraine	60		2026		
United Arab Emirates	65		2026	In the United Arab Emirates the mandatory retirement age was raised from 60 to 65 in 2010, enabling the UAE to retain its needed expat skilled work force longer for key construction projects.	
United Kingdom	66 years 8 months		2026	See also: Pensions in the United Kingdom State pension age increased to 66 in 2020, and will go up to 67 by 2028, and to 68 by 2037.	
United States	(A) Earliest age is 62 (with 25 to 30% reduction in benefits) (B) Standard is 66 or 67 (with full benefits) (C) Delaying taking retirement benefits up to age 70 provides up to 25% increase in benefit amount		2026	See also: Pensions in the United States The Social Security Administration, is the Government agency responsible for social services in the United States. Pension age in the United States is based on one's birth year. The earliest a person can retire is 62, but benefits for a single may be reduced by 25% to 30%. The age for the full benefit amount (100%) is 66 for people born before 1960 and 67 for people born after 1960. If a prospective retiree delays taking government benefits up to age 70 the full pension amount is incrementally increased, with a maximum benefit of 125% for retirement at age 70.	
Uruguay	60–70		2026	60 years and 30 working years minimum (1995), or 65 years and 25 working years and progressive to 70 in age and 15 working years (2009).	
Uzbekistan	60	55	2026		
Venezuela	60	55	2026		
Vietnam	61 years 6 months	57	2026	The retirement age will gradually increase to 62 for males by 2028 and 60 for females by 2035. In 2021, the retirement age is 60.25 (age 60 and 3 months) for men and 55.33 (age 55 and 4 months) for women, the age will be increased by 3 months each year following for men and 4 months for women.	

== France ==
In France, the maximum working age was recognized in 2009 and set at 70. That means a company cannot force its employees to retire before the age of 70. France is one of the few countries to have three legal ages: the minimum (64 years), the maximum (70 years), and the full retirement age (variable, maximum 67 years).

== Japan ==
In Japan, the legal retirement age was 60 until March 31, 2013. It will gradually increase to 65 in 2025 for men, (61 in 2013, 62 in 2016, 63 in 2019, and 64 in 2022), and in 2030 for women (61 in 2018, 62 in 2021, 63 in 2024, and 64 in 2027).

== See also ==
- Ageism
- Mandatory retirement
- Pension systems by country
- Population ageing
- Retirement in Europe
