= Instituto Nacional de las Personas Adultas Mayores =

Mexican public welfare program for senior citizens

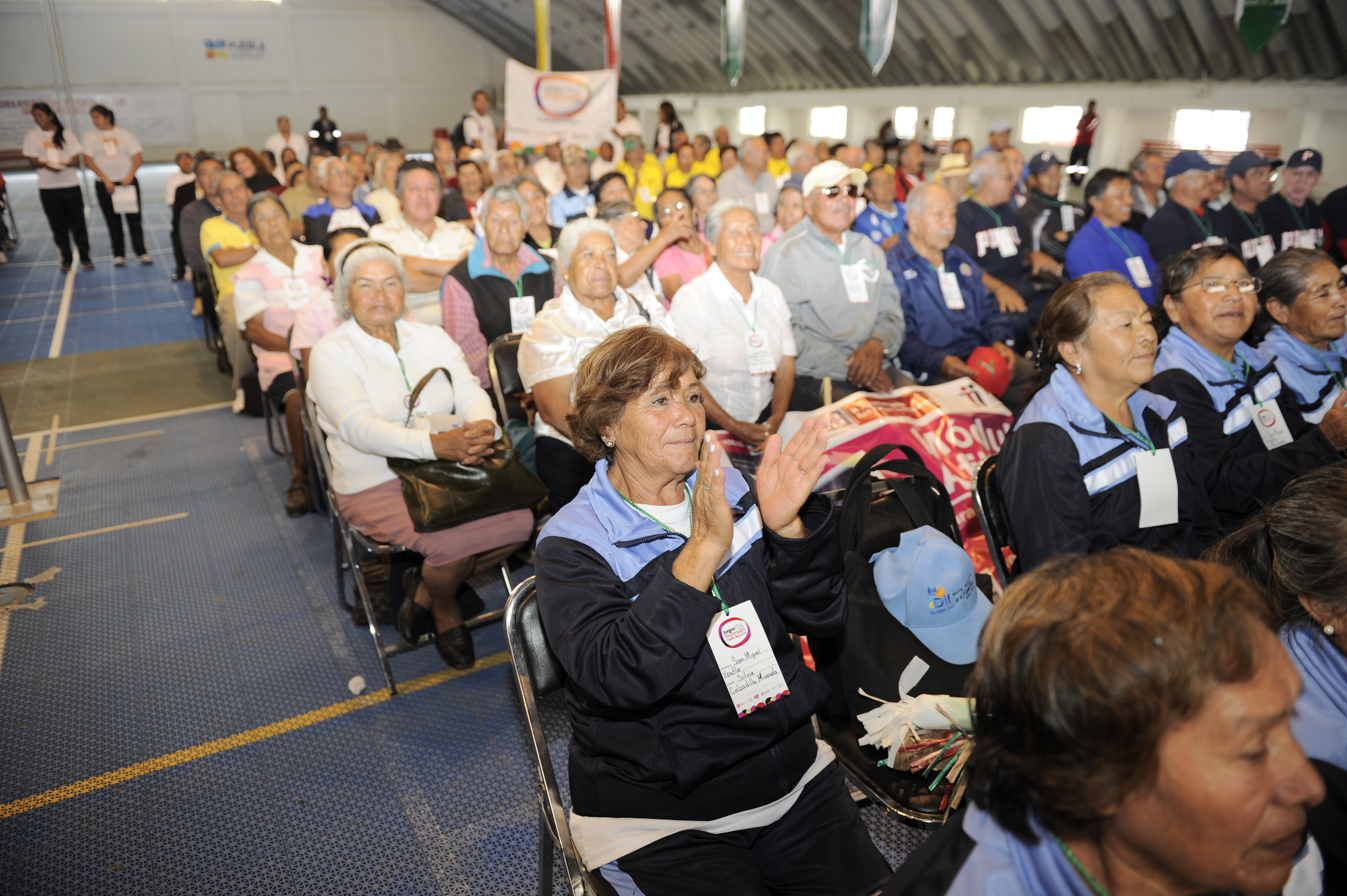
This image represents a group of elderly people in Mexico at the first regional sports game hosted by the INAPAM

Instituto Nacional de las Personas Adultas Mayores (INAPAM) (English: National Institute of Older Adult Persons) is a Mexican public welfare organization for families, composed of offices run by both federal and state governments. INAPAM offers programs to improve the well-being of the elderly. Services include providing education regarding physical and mental health, hosting different cultural activities, and holding job expositions. Also, INAPAM offers training for people 65 years-of-age and older to become authorized caretakers for the elderly, and offers various benefits like discounts on clothing, entertainment venues and hotels.

== Background ==
In 1975, INAPAM was implemented as part of the Secretariat of Health, however, the institute did not start its work until 2000. INAPAM organizes Mexico's aging policy. INAPAM is supported by the Pension Program for the Elderly. Pension Program for the Elderly is a program administered by the Secretariat of Social Development. The goal of the program is to provide financial support and services to the elderly in Mexico. During a session established on July 2, 2013, the positions and functions of the members of the citizen council of the INAPAM were established. C. María Eugenia Moreno Gómez is the president of the committee. Dr. Ignacio Javier Orozco García and Guillermo Andrés Espinosa Velasco are in charge of setting up meetings and making decisions. The citizen committee gets together four times a year to present, promote and propose ideas that will improve the programs available in the INAPAM. The main topics discussed are advice on how to spread information socially so individuals of all ages are aware of what it means to become an elder and what rights each elder possesses. With this, the INAPAM hopes that the rights for the elderly will not be taken for granted and will be valued.

=== Demography ===
The Demographics of Mexico are important to understanding why the country created this program for the elderly. Since 1975, the median age of the Mexican population has risen significantly. In 2015, the median age of the population was 27.4 years. Also, from 2004 to 2015, the portion of the population aged 65 years and over increased gradually.

=== Goals ===
INAPAM provides programs for individuals over the age of 60 who wish to stay active. The main goal of INAPAM is to make sure that the elderly can enjoy their lives by taking advantage of the opportunities and rights that they provide to them.

== Eligibility ==
The INAPAM discount card is available to all Mexican citizens and foreign residents who are 60 years of age and above.

To apply for an INAPAM card, citizens must have four requirements covered. The first necessary step is to provide verification for the people's identity. The program requires people to send in at least 8 pieces of identification. A few of these forms of identification include the person's IMSS credentials (Mexican Social Security Institute), ISSSTE credentials (Institute for Social Security and Services for State Workers), and a valid passport. The second step that the program requires is a verification that the individual is over 60 years of age, which includes similar identification documents.

== Benefits ==
The INAPAM discount card provides benefits for its citizens in all different types of categories. Benefits that come with this card include discounts with:

- Medications in Pharmacies
- Dentists and doctors
- Buses, airlines, some taxi firms
- Convenience stores, local food stores
- Hotels and travel agencies
- Festivity halls
- Museums, archeology parks, art galleries, and bookstores
- Some legal firms, art and craft stores, car services, repair centers, plumbers, electricians, dry cleaners, etc.
- Property taxes and water bills varying by municipality

INAPAM not only provides discounts of goods and services but also searches to provide certain kinds of jobs for elderly people. Mexico has a number of laws surrounding the care of elderly citizens and INAPAM is an organization that makes sure these laws are kept in place. The Federal Elder Rights Law contains all the laws concerning the treatment and rights of older people in Mexico. Under these laws INAPAM has the need to protect its members, to ensure that they are being included in activities depending on their capacities, to promote the research related to the elderly and to provide a community for these individuals to associate with.

== See also ==
- Culture of Mexico
- Demographics of Mexico
- Economy of Mexico
- Healthcare in Mexico
- Pension Program for the Elderly (Mexico)

== Bibliography ==
- Garcia, Eduardo (Fall 2010). "A Discussion of Federal Elder Rights Law in Mexico". Journal of International Aging Law & Policy. 4: 75–82. ISBN 978-3-319-12598-5.
- Herrick, John; Stuart, Paul (2005). Encyclopedia of Social Welfare History in North America. SAGE. ISBN 978-0-7619-2584-2.
- INAPAM (21 July 2016). "Misión del INAPAM". INAPAM. Archived from the original on 20 November 2016.
- INAPAM (28 July 2016). "Requisitos para obtener la Tarjeta INAPAM". INAPAM. Archived from the original on 10 November 2016.
- Mexperience (24 August 2015). "INAPAM: Mexico's Discount Card". Mexperia.
- Martínez, Raúl Pérez; Ramírez, Jesús Federico Velasco (17 October 2011). "Actitud Ante la Muerte en Ancianos que se Encuentran en Asilos del INAPAM" (PDF). Asociación Mexicana de Tanatología.
- Robledo, Luis Miguel Gutiérrez; Ortega, Mariana López; Arango Lopera, Victoria Eugenia (December 2012). "The State of Elder Care in Mexico". Current Translational Geriatrics and Experimental Gerontology Reports. 1 (4): 183–189. doi:10.1007/s13670-012-0028-z.
- United Nations (July 2016). "Mexico: Median age of the population from 1950 to 2020* (in years)". The Statista Portal.
- Vega, William; Markides, Kyriakos; Angel, Jacqueline; Torres-Gil, Fernando (2015). Challenges of Latino Aging in the Americas. Springer. pp. 383–391. ISBN 978-3319125985.
- World Bank (June 2016). "Mexico: Life expectancy at birth from 2005 to 2015". The Statista Portal.
- World Bank (October 2016). "Mexico: Age Distribution from 2004 to 2015". The Statista Portal.
