= Workers and Farmers Pensions =

Pension system in France

The French law on workers’ and farmers’ pensions, enacted in 1910, established a compulsory funded pension system for individuals over the age of 65. The compulsory nature of contributions was annulled in 1911 by the Court of Cassation, and a 1912 amendment lowered the retirement age to 60.

== German example ==
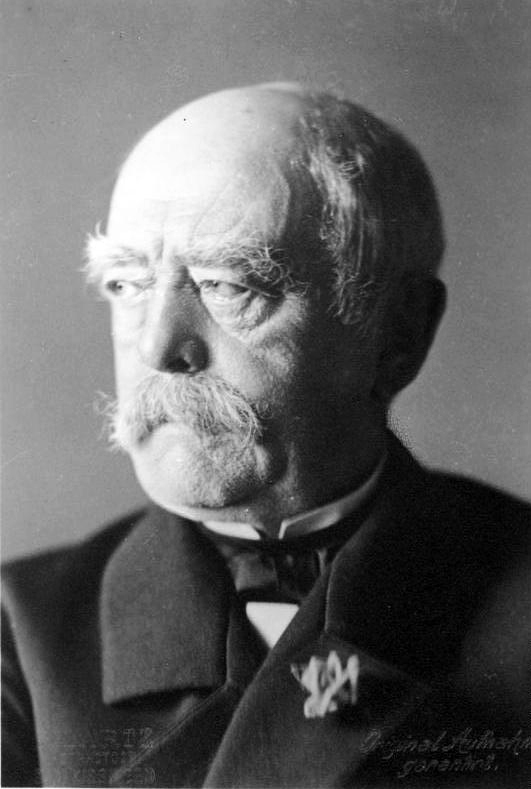
Otto von Bismarck

Following its victory in 1871, the German Empire experienced significant industrial expansion. Chancellor Otto von Bismarck, pursuing a policy of defensive conservatism alongside the anti-socialist laws, introduced a system of social insurance that included health insurance in 1883, accident insurance in 1886, and disability and old-age insurance in 1889. In this “Bismarckian” model, social benefits were directly linked to worker contributions.

The 1889 law created a funded pension system jointly administered by employers and employees, with the State serving only a financial function. It provided an annuity equal to 16% of the average wage after thirty years of contributions. The upper age limit was set at 70; however, because German pension insurance combined disability and old-age benefits, the majority of employees—approximately 90%—retired on disability before reaching that age.

Several neighboring countries soon adopted similar systems, while France remained hesitant.

== French context ==
Since the Civil Service Pensions Law of 8 June 1853, which extended pension provisions to the entire public service, all civil and military civil servants have received pay-as-you-go pensions.

Several private-sector professions also gained pension rights. In 1850, the first private railway companies created pension funds for certain categories of employees. Miners obtained compulsory health insurance and a pension system in 1894, followed by workers in arsenals and armaments in 1897, and all railway workers in 1909. These initiatives were introduced by employers, primarily to stabilize and retain the workforce.

A third model for organizing social protection institutions, influenced by socialist mutualist ideas associated with figures such as Robert Owen and Pierre-Joseph Proudhon, also began to emerge.

== The 1910 law ==
=== Development ===
The law of 5 April 1910 established the Workers’ and Farmers’ Pensions system (ROP), which broadly followed the German model. The State guaranteed benefits linked to contributions from employers and employees, as well as tenant farmers, sharecroppers, and domestic workers, and provided additional funding. Unlike the German system, however, it did not include disability coverage, even though in Germany most pension payments were made under that category before the age limit was reached.

The CGT opposed the law because the retirement age of 65 exceeded the average life expectancy. At the time, only about 8% of the population reached that age, and workers represented only a small fraction of that group. The union therefore criticized the measure as a “retirement for the dead.” It also objected to the limited role of contributors in managing a State-controlled funded scheme, expressing concern that accumulated capital might be used to prepare for or support military efforts.

A significant portion of employers also opposed the law.

The system applied compulsorily to all individuals with an annual wage below 3,000 francs. It was the first law in France to establish a compulsory and general retirement scheme for workers and farmers. It remained optional for tenant farmers, sharecroppers, cultivators, and for employees earning between 3,000 and 5,000 francs per year. Miners, who had their own system since 1894, were excluded from its scope.

=== Implementation ===
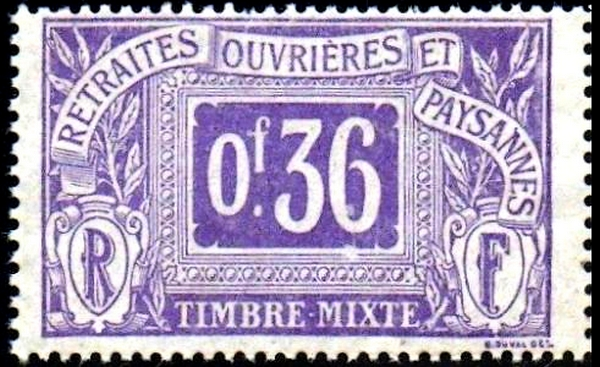
Stamp used to validate the contribution, issued in France after 1911.

A card-based system using socio-postal stamps was introduced, but it proved difficult to use and met with resistance from workers, as it resembled the worker’s booklet formerly used to control hired labor until 1890.

On 11 December 1911, the Court of Cassation effectively nullified the compulsory nature of the law by ruling that an employer could not require an employee to contribute, a decision reaffirmed in 1912. The 1912 revision of the law also allowed pensions to be claimed at age 60. Subsequent episodes of monetary depreciation in 1910 and 1918, linked to inflation, soon undermined the stability of this funded pension system.

After the First World War, the reintegration of the three departments of Alsace-Moselle raised the question of whether to abolish the Bismarckian system in force there or to extend it to the rest of France. The latter option was adopted, as France was then the last European country without general social insurance.

The four currency devaluations that occurred after 1936 further underscored the limitations of funded pension systems. Between 1936 and 1939, the issue generated 24 bills or legislative proposals.

A pay-as-you-go pension system was introduced in 1941 under the direction of René Belin, former CGT secretary, with the creation of the Old-Age Allowance for Salaried Workers (AVTS). It was subsequently generalized nationwide with the 1945 ordinance.

== See also ==
- Mutualism (economic theory)
- Otto von Bismarck
- Pensions in France
- Pensions in Germany

== Bibliography ==
- Laroque, Michel (2015). "Des premiers systèmes obligatoires de protection sociale aux assurances sociales" [From the first mandatory social protection systems to social insurance]. Vie sociale (in French) (10): 31–48.
- Dumons, Bruno; Gilles, Pollet (1994). L'État et les retraites. Genèse d'une politique [The State and pensions. The origins of a policy] (in French). Belin.
