= Pensions in Armenia =

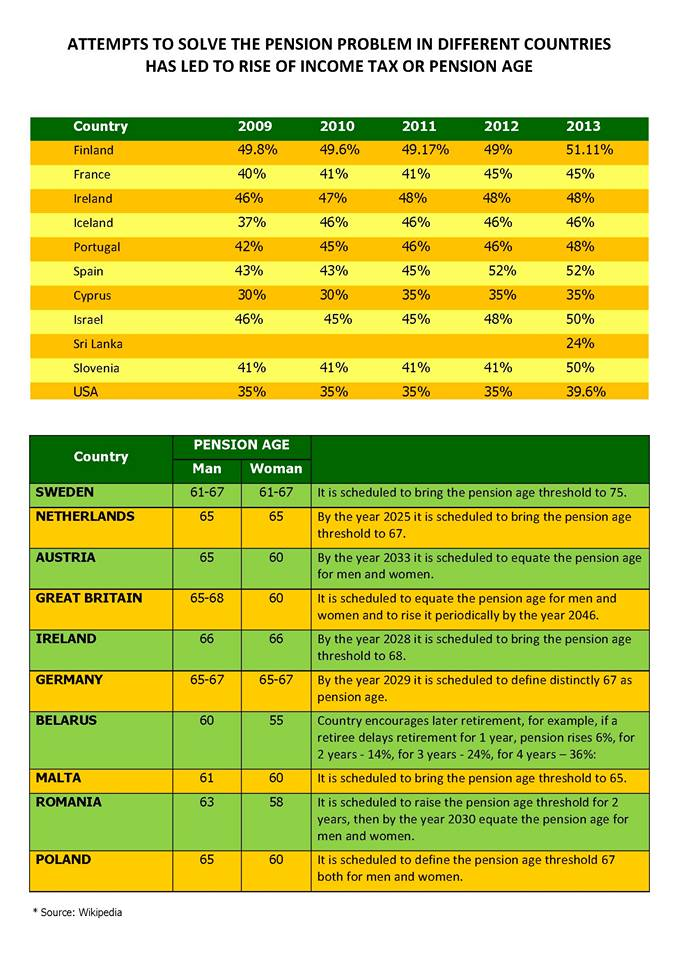
Analysis showing attempts to solve the pension problem in different countries has led to rise of income tax or pension age

There are various types of Pensions in Armenia, including social pensions (granted to all individuals who reach the age of 63, both for laborers and not), mandatory funded pensions (a return on investment from mandatory funded pensions), or voluntary funded pensions (payments of supplementary pension collected over the years from income as well as insurance fees). Currently, Amundi-ACBA and Ampega act as the mandatory pension fund managers within Armenia.

== History ==
Before the implementation of pension reforms, the pension security system of Armenia was characterized as a pay-as-you-earn tax based pension system. The system performed a distributive function; the payments were made by employees, employers and individual entrepreneurs to the state budget, of which the pensions payments were provided by the order defined by law.

The pension amount in this system is calculated based on the basic pension amount, the number of years in service and the compensation amount for each ensured service year, as well as pensioner’s personal coefficient (the latter is also calculated based on the number of eligible years of service).

Over time, however, due to a number of factors the pension system failed to meet the expectations of its beneficiaries. Evidently, the Armenian government had to ensure adequate living standards by guaranteeing their pensioners a dependable pension provision. Therefore, the Armenian government, started looking for other ways to solve the problem, mainly putting forward the idea of developing self-financing pension systems.

=== Pension reforms incentives ===
Armenia maintained a pension system known to the world as the “Bismarck System”, which proved to be effective until the end of the 20th century. That efficiency was attributed to the rapid development of economics which resulted in increase in labor income among the population, as well as, in the State tax revenues. Conditioned with the growth of the State budget revenue, Armenia was able to expand the number of social services provided to citizens by significantly changing their life quality. However, a series of processes took place which later on created a critical situation in the pension system. Including:

1. the average life expectancy increase which resulted from improvements of healthcare services and technologies,
2. birth rate decrease as a result of which the elderly population grew in proportion

As such, this type of pension security system expired itself and it was necessary to find brand-new solutions. As a result of theoretical and practical steps of different countries undergoing the pension reforms, three alternative solutions were created:

- Tax burden increase among the working population;
- Retirement age increase;
- Development of self-financing pension systems.

=== The grounds for pension reforms in Armenia ===
Armenia faced the problem of pension provision after the collapse of the Soviet Union in 1991. This was promoted by a number of factors such as:

- financial instability as a result of which the State budget was unable to provide pensioners with sufficient pensions,
- the demographic situation following Armenia's regained independence; i.e. fertility decline, migration of the working population.

Starting from the 1990's, the Government of Armenia has put the pension issue at the top of its agenda. A number of resolutions and laws were adopted, aimed at pension reform, including the:

1. Laws "On the State Pension Security" were adopted respectively in 1992 and 1995;
2. and the Law "On State Pensions" adopted in 2003.

In the initial phase, the preference was given to raising the retirement age, increasing the tax burden which, in fact, proved to be a temporary solution and would not provide reasonable long term results. Like numerous countries which have undergone pension reforms, Armenia decided to set up a new self-financing pension system. Between 2005-2006, a new phase of pension reforms launched under which the Government, which adopted a series of regulatory decisions. The "Law On Funded Pensions" was adopted on 22 December 2010 by the National Assembly. Thus, the pension system in Armenia became a multi pillar one, with two new voluntary and mandatory funded pension components being introduced.

=== Pension system investment objectives ===
To minimize the risk of poverty at retirement by providing social welfare to the elderly:

1. to ensure long-term financial sustainability of the pension system,
2. create a direct, visible link between the individual’s income and their future pension amount.

It is expected that pension funds will bring long-term financial resources into the economy which will lead to:

1. increased national savings;
2. loan interest rate reduction;
3. investments growth

== Recent developments ==
As of 2021, over 17.5% of the population receives a social pension, the number is expected to increase to 29.1% by 2050, according to experts.

As of 1 July 2018, employees born after 1973 will be required to pay into a mandatory pension fund, as opposed to the voluntary scheme followed since 2011. They will be contributing:

- 5% of pay, if their monthly earnings are under AMD 500,000 (roughly equal to US$1,040), or
- 10% of pay, less AMD 25,000 (roughly US$52), if their monthly earnings are AMD 500,000 or more — subject to a maximum monthly contribution of AMD 50,000 (roughly US$104)

Both of the above will receive matching contributions from the government up to AMD 500,000 per month.

As of 1 July 2020, the maximum threshold for the calculation of the pension contribution will increase from AMD 500,000 to AMD 1,020,000 (15 times the minimum monthly salary of AMD 68,000). Also from 1 January 2020, the minimum monthly salary is increased from AMD 55,000 to AMD 68,000.

== See also ==
- Economy of Armenia
- Social protection in Armenia
