= Pensions in Germany =

The German pension system, known as the "public retirement insurance," was established over 100 years ago by Chancellor Bismarck, making it the world's first formal pension system. It has been successful in providing a high and reliable level of retirement income and has served as a model for numerous social security systems globally. Originally designed as a scaled premium system, it became a pay-as-you-go system in 1957, mandating participation for all dependent employees and certain self-employed groups. The system is characterized by a fragmentation in terms of institutions, coverage, contributions, and benefit levels.

Pensions in Germany are based on a “three pillar system”.

- First pillar: mandatory state pension insurance (gesetzliche Rentenversicherung). This part of the basic social security system. All employees and employers pay a percentage of salaries into this system.
- Second pillar: voluntary occupational pension insurance
- Third pillar: private insurance

== Mandatory state pension provision ==
The scheme is based on the pay-as-you-go (or redistributive) model. Funds paid in by contributors (employees and employers) are not saved (or invested) but are used to pay current pension obligations.

Civil servants in Germany do not pay any contributions themselves but their salaries are correspondingly lower than those in the private sector.

The retirement age in Germany is currently 65, but will gradually rise to 67 by 2031 depending on year of birth and how long contributions have been made. Each missing year results in a 3.6% reduction in the pension entitlement. The German Institute for Economic Research has been arguing that the retirement age needs to have been 70 by 2025, and in 2025 the economics minister Katherina Reiche gave support to such an increase, creating tensions in the governing coalition.

The state scheme is financed by a payroll tax known as "social security contributions". The social security contributions also include contributions to statutory unemployment, health and long-term care insurance.The contribution for pension insurance in 2024 was 18.6% of pay up to the social security contribution ceiling of €90,600 (Western Bundesländer) and €89,400 (Eastern Bundesländer). The amount is paid half and half by employer and employee contributions.

The amount paid to retirees is based on average salaries. The German pension insurance agency publishes the value of each year’s contribution (remuneration point). This is then multiplied by the number of years contributed and the percentage of the average salary earned during the person's lifetime. The average pension in 2012 was €1,263.15 per month. The maximum pension for someone having earned twice the average salary (€64,200) would be €2,526.30.

== Voluntary occupational pension provision ==
The Voluntary Occupational Pension schemes (Betriebliche Altersvorsorge) were created under the Company Pensions Law (Betriebsrentengesetz) in 1974 and are a benefit granted by a company to its employees. Voluntary schemes can fall into different categories:

- Defined benefit (Leistungszusage)
- Defined Contribution (Beitragsorientierte Leistungszusage)
- Contribution with minimum benefit

The schemes can be structured in various ways:

- Direct Grant (Direktzusage)
- Support Fund (Unterstützungskasse)
- Pension Company (Pensionskasse)
- Direct Insurance (Direktversicherung)
- Pension Fund (Pensionsfonds)

In 2009 contributions up to €2,500 (Betriebsbemessungsgrenze) were tax free. A further €1,800 in contributions to Direct Insurance schemes are tax free. About 50% of workers in Germany are covered by these schemes.

According to the Deutsches Institut für Zeitwertkonten und Pension Lösungen, a consultancy, "in almost all firms, 30 to 50% of the capital required to meet the commitments made in days when the interest rates were higher is missing". The Germans have invested 500 billion euros in Voluntary Occupational Pension and 170 to 225 billion euros are needed to fill in the coverage gap.

== Private provision ==
Private pension schemes in Germany are personal funded pensions. The funds are protected by law and cannot be seized by creditors or the state. They are also not inheritable. Payments into these funds benefit from a government sponsored tax credit of €154 per year per adult and up to an additional €300 if the fund beneficiary has children. The most popular form of private pension provisions is the so-called Riester Pension. The annual government expenditure for the tax credits is at around €7bn. An alternative government sponsored private pension scheme is the Rürup Pension, which is specifically, albeit not exclusively, designed for self-employed people, who are usually not eligible for the Riester Pension.

Germans can take early retirement if they agree to forgo a percentage of their state pension.

== Pension Reform 2025 (Rentenpaket 2025) ==
On 6 August 2025 the federal government of Germany (german: "Bundestag") agreed on the "Rentenpaket 2025" in order to build a fairer and more stable state pension system which aims to uphold a stable pension level at 48% by 2031. The reform package by the coalition of CDU/CSU and SPD contents the lifting of the assertion ban (Anschlussverbot), that should make it possible and easier for pensioners to work beside their pension, also a part is the "maternal rent III" (Mütterrente III) intended to help mothers who gave birth to children before 1992 to finance their child-raising retrospectively and the financing of these reforms is provided by the federal Budget of Germany which will be an amount in the tens of millions.

== See also ==
- UK pensions
- US pensions
- Pensions in Austria
- Pensions in France
- Pensions in the Netherlands
- Pension system in Switzerland
- Sozialgesetzbuch
- Pan-European Pension
- Workers and Farmers Pensions
