= Pensions in the Czech Republic =

Pensions in the Czech Republic are publicly funded and supported by voluntary supplementary third pillar personal pension savings.

== The pillars ==
The first pillar is a defined benefit pay-as-you go system for all economically active individuals and it is valid since 1996. Self-employed people pay 28% of their earnings to this system while employees only pay 6.5% and the rest (21.5%) is paid by their employers. More than 99% of the population who reach the stipulated age have pensions from this basic pension insurance.

The Czech Republic does not have a second pillar. For three years, from 2013 to 2016, the Czech Republic had this pillar, but because of low interest, it was cancelled and the money was transferred to the first pillar.

The third pillar forms the complementary additional pension insurance with state contributions and products offered by commercial insurance companies. These companies mostly offer life insurance and each of them can have only one pension plan. People who join this system can change pension funds whenever they want without extra fees and they can receive payments after age of 60.

== Types of benefits ==
=== Old-age pension ===
The old-age pensions (Czech: starobní důchod) are the monthly benefits for people who have reached retirement age or who have worked for the required number of years. It has two components: a basic amount, which is 2700 CZK and a percentage amount which is defined individually, but cannot be less than 770 CZK.

=== Early old-age pension ===
This pension is for people who opt to receive a pension before retirement. Applicants for this plan must meet three conditions. They cannot perform any gainful activities, they have to reach a certain age and they must meet the minimum number of insured years. At best, they will be able to retire 5 years before retirement age. However, candidates need to consider the benefits, because during early retirement they cannot work and cannot receive unemployed benefit.

=== Invalidity pension ===
The invalidity pension (Czech: invalidní důchod) is for people who cannot fully work for health reasons. Three levels of disability are distinguished. If the decrease in ability to work is 35–49%, then it falls under the first degree of disability. If a person has decrease in ability more than 50% but less than 69%, it falls under the second degree of disability and cases with 70% or more decrease in ability fall under the third degree. Moreover, if applicants opt to receive this benefit, they cannot meet the conditions for receiving a standard old-age pension (in that case they will receive only old-age pension) and they have to have pension insurance for the stipulated periods. Like the old-age pension, the invalidity pension has two components. The first is a basic amount, which is 2700 CZK. The second component, a percentage amount, depends on the number of insured years and the degree of disability. The percentage amount is at least 770 CZK.

=== Widow's and widower's pension ===
People can receive this pension in the case of a husband's or wife's death. They can claim this pension exactly after death if the deceased meets one of the following conditions:

- received old-age pension
- received invalidity pension
- on the date of death he/she fulfilled the condition of the necessary insurance period for entitlement to invalidity or old-age pension
- died as a result of an accident at work

A widower or widow may apply for this pension one year after the death of a spouse, if they meet one of the following conditions:

- he/she cares for a dependent child
- their child depends on the help of another person in Grade II or Grade III or Grade IV
- he/she cares for his/her parent or the parent of a deceased spouse who lives with him/her in the household and who is dependent on the assistance of another person in Grade II, Grade III or Grade IV
- he/she has third-degree disability
- he/she has reached retirement age, or an age that is no more than 4 years below the retirement age of a man who was born in the same year

The amount of the widow's or widower's pension is 50% of the retirement pension, or 50% of the third-degree invalidity pension to which the deceased had, or would have, been entitled at the time of death.

=== Orphan's pension ===
An orphan's pension (Czech: sirotčí důchod) is for children whose parents or adoptive parents or carers have died. They are entitled to this pension if the deceased:

- received old-age pension or
- received invalidity pension or
- on the date of death he/she has fulfilled the condition of the necessary insurance period for entitlement to invalidity or old-age pension or
- died as a result of an accident at work

The amount of the orphan's pension is 40% of the retirement pension or 40% of the third degree invalidity pension to which the deceased had or would have been entitled at the time of death.

== Retirement age ==
Retirement age depends on the person's year of birth and gender. For a woman, the retirement age depends also on the number of children she has raised. For every man who was born before 1936, the retirement age is 60 years and 2 months. Retirement age for a woman, who was born before that year and has five or more children is 53. For those women who have raised three or four children it is 54, while for those who have raised two children it is 55, with one child it is 56 and women without children who were born before 1936 have a retirement age of 57. The retirement age for each person who was born after 1977 is 67. People who were born between 1936 and 1977 have a different retirement age, but it is always true that the retirement age of men is higher or equal to the retirement age of women. For example, a woman who was born in 1955 and has 2 children, has a retirement age of 60.

== External sources ==
- "Czech Republic - Old-age pensions". European Commission.
- "Czech Republic - Disability". European Commission.
