= Social protection in Armenia =

Social protection in Armenia is an Armenian state policy, which addresses social protection issues and supports the social welfare of citizens. It is overseen by the Ministry of Labor and Social Affairs.

== Introduction ==
The state social protection system of Armenia is financed by the state budget. The services provided within this institution are free for citizens. The Ministry Labor and Social Affairs coordinates the services provision process. The social protection system of Armenia plays an important role in providing social support to the population and alleviating extreme poverty. The social protection policy is aimed at managing social risks by the state via prevention, reduction and regulation.

Prior to the COVID-19 pandemic, Armenia was making gradual improvements to its business environment and establishing a track record of prudent macroeconomic policy management. Economic growth was strong, averaging 6.8 percent between 2017-2019. While Armenia's progress slowed in 2020 due to the pandemic and the 2020 Nagorno-Karabakh war, the International Labour Organization forecasted the Armenian economy to grow by nearly 8% in 2021.

== History ==
=== Social protection system during the First Republic of Armenia ===
The Ministry of Public Assistance was established in November 1918, at the time when the second government of the First Republic of Armenia was reorganizing. On 8 April 1919, it was renamed “The Ministry of Labor and Public Assistance”. Until 5 July 1919, the Ministry of Food used to organize food purchasing and distributing works. However, on 5 July 1919, the Ministry of Food was dissolved, its functions were transferred to the Ministry of Labor and Public Assistance. On 8 January 1920, the Ministry was renamed “The Ministry of Reconstruction and Public Assistance”. It comprised the Orphanage, Migration, Labor Organization, Medical and Sanitary, Labor Protection, and the Architecture and Construction Departments.

1914–1920 were particularly challenging; the First World War, the Armenian genocide and lasting conflicts with Turkey had left behind hundreds of thousands of refugees. Despite this, the Armenian people gained independence with the establishment of the First Republic of Armenia in 1918. Meanwhile, the Ministry of Reconstruction and Public Assistance maintained representatives both in Georgia and Azerbaijan, making allocations to fulfill the basic needs of Armenian communities in Georgia and Azerbaijan.

=== Social protection system during the Second Republic of Armenia ===
When Armenia became part of the Soviet Union, Bolshevik leaders replaced Armenian government Ministers.

On 8 December 1920 the Ministry was reorganized as the Commissariat of Reconstruction and Care. Later, on 21 December it was renamed “People’s Commissariat for Social Security”. On 12 March 1925, it was again renamed and this time bore the name of “People’s Commissariat of Labor and Social Security”. In 1946, the Ministry for Social Security of the Armenian Soviet Socialist Republic was once again reorganized. The Ministry consisted of the Pensions and Benefits Department, Job Placement and Household Management, Medical-Working Expertise, Financial planning, Capital Construction and other administrative departments.

=== Armenia's social protection system after 1991 ===
Following the collapse of the Soviet Union in 1991, the Ministry for Social Security was reorganized into the Ministry of Labor and Social Security. After the 1995 Armenian parliamentary election, according to Presidential Decree, the government structure underwent changes; the Ministry was reorganized into the Ministry of Social Security, Employment, Migration and Refugee Affairs.

In 1996, according to Presidential Decree, the government underwent further structural changes. On 8 November 1996, the Ministry was reorganized into the Ministry of Social Security. On 28 February 2000, the Ministry was merged into the Ministry of Health and Social Security. On 20 May 2000, the Ministry was separated from the Ministry of Social Security. On 25 December 2003, it was renamed the Ministry of Labor and Social Affairs.

Armenia faced increased challenges during the first years of independence. The consequences of the earthquake of 1988 (which killed between 25 and 50 thousand people) were still present. While the Turkish blockade of Armenia, immigration of displaced persons, the energy crisis, and high unemployment rates only made it worse.

Social Protection and Labour Programs: % of Total Welfare of Beneficiary Households from 2008 to 2018

In 1992, the poverty rate in Armenia reached 94%. As such, the Government of Armenia implemented drastic economic reforms. Humanitarian aid was of primary importance. The President assigned the government to set up a system that would organize the distribution of humanitarian aid. A working group of specialists was formed and a clear set of regulations enacted. The Social Services Institute within the Ministry of Social Security was formed. The Ministry came to distinctly specify the poverty rate among needy families, as well as regulate the operative and unbiased distribution of humanitarian aid. Social services were funded from the State budget and beneficiary services were provided free of charge.

In 2005, the Law on Social Assistance and the Law on State Benefits were both passed by government. It ensures that social assistance and social services are provided to people in difficult life situations and assist citizens to mitigate or prevent those difficulties, while helping to integrate vulnerable communities/individuals into society.

According to the United Nations Development Programme, the unemployment rate in Armenia dropped to 17.8%, while the poverty rate dropped to 23.5% in 2021.

== Structure ==
There are 15 social protection programs in Armenia. These programs are classified into three major social protection components:

- Social assistance;
- Social insurance;
- Labour market programs

These programs include child protection and health care programs, family and maternity benefit programs, pension programs, unemployment benefits, assistance to the disabled and elderly, among others. The right to social services is enshrined in Article 37 of the Constitution of Armenia.

== Recent developments ==
A study conducted by the European Commission in 2011 found that the social protection system of Armenia had improved and state policy played an important role in providing social support to the population and alleviating extreme poverty. The report further noted that continued reforms in the social assistance policy are critical in order to achieve sustainable results and ensure that social assistance programs are accessible to all.

In November 2017, Armenia and the European Union signed the Armenia-EU Comprehensive and Enhanced Partnership Agreement. The agreement includes clauses focusing on improving social affairs, tackling unemployment, and supporting rural development.

Between 2019 and 2020, UNICEF and the World Bank conducted an in-depth review of social protection systems in Armenia, with the aim to provide the Armenian government a baseline to address existing gaps and further reform the social protection system in response to emerging needs.

In July 2021, EU Commissioner for Neighborhood and Enlargement Oliver Varhelyi announced that the EU will be granting an amount of approximately $3.1 billion USD in aid to Armenia. The aid will support various programs aimed at improving social conditions in Armenia.

The United States Agency for International Development (USAID) actively cooperates with the Armenian government and local civil society organizations to support and implement social programs across the country and strengthen the capacity of the government to implement its broad social reform agenda.

== See also ==
- Economy of Armenia
- Human rights in Armenia
- Pensions in Armenia
- Politics of Armenia
- Social issues in Armenia
