= Pension Program for the Elderly (Mexico) =

The Pension Program for the Elderly (PPE) is a safety net, noncontributory pension program administered by the federal Secretariat of Social Development (SEDESOL) in Mexico. The program aims to expand the schemes of universal social security, by providing financial support and social protection to people 65 or older who a) do not benefit from retirement or contributory pension plans or b) receive income from retirement plans or contributory pension programs that does not exceed a certain amount determined by SEDESOL.

== The Elderly Population in Mexico and its Vulnerability ==
Fueled by an increase in life expectancy, Mexico is going through an unprecedented demographic shift which has led to a rapid increase in the aging population over the last decades. From 1.8 million people aged 65 and older in 1970, the population within this age range increased to 4.7 million in 2000 and totaled 7.5 million in 2012 (which was equivalent to approximately 6.41% of the total population in 2012). By 2050, the number of people 65 or older is expected to reach 28.7 million, which will represent just over 20% of the total population. The high vulnerability of the elderly in Mexico (especially among those that do not benefit from social security and contributory pension plans) has been documented by several sources. Data from 2010 revealed that 28.8% of people 65 and up did not have access to social security. In 2012, estimates showed that 45.8% of the population aged 65 and up lived in poverty, and that 50% of the elders within this segment of the population were still working, even after reaching the usual retirement ages. Furthermore, data have suggested that one in 5 people over 65 have difficulty in engaging in normal daily activities (e.g. bathing, getting dressed, walking), have limited access to health services, and are not culturally prone to disease prevention. All these factors, along with a rise in the incidence of chronic diseases have worsened the elderly population's natural vulnerability that results from the end of a productive life and have created a greater dependence, as well as a reduction in their overall ability to function.

In alignment with objective 2.4 of Mexico's National Development Plan 2013–2018 (and to National Strategy 2.4.2 in the Plan), the PPE seeks to reduce the vulnerability of the population aged 65 and up by providing its enrollees with a cash subsidy every two months, and by facilitating access to social security.

== History ==
To target the increasing number of people that reached retirement age without social security coverage (i.e. mostly those who were part of the informal sector during most of their working life), the first safety net noncontributory pension program was launched in Mexico City in 2001. Subsequently, several states throughout the country as well as the federal government have developed similar programs. As of 2011, 17 out of the 32 states in Mexico had at least one safety net program. The federal PPE is an extension of the original "70 and More Program" which began to operate in 2007. Originally, the program provided nationwide coverage to poor people aged at least 70 who lived in rural communities with no more than 2,500 inhabitants. However, since fiscal year 2013, the program targets all people 65 or over who live in rural or urban communities (regardless of the number of inhabitants) and who meet certain eligibility criteria. The inclusion of people in the 65–69 age range in both rural and urban communities was encouraged by the success of the previous "70 and More Program" which showed an improvement in the quality of life of its enrollees and a reduction in their physical and mental health deterioration.

== Program Characteristics ==
The PPE caters to the elderly population in Mexico by providing cash transfers to its beneficiaries on a bimonthly basis. As of 2014, enrollees received $1,160 Mexican pesos every two months. In addition, beneficiaries participate in informative sessions on health issues and receive assistance that enables them to access services and support from institutions such as the National Institute for the Older Adults (INAPAM) and other organizations that offer occupational activities. The program's budget for 2013 totaled 26 billion Mexican pesos, equivalent to 0.17% of Mexico's GDP in that year (based on OECD's economic projections). The following requirements must be met by individuals in order to qualify for PPE:

- Age 65 and up
- Mexican citizens or
- Non-nationals who have lived in Mexico for over 25 years
- If enrolled in the elderly component of the Oportunidades conditional cash transfer program, they must waive their right to benefit from that program
- For the year 2019, the amount of financial support that older adults will receive is $1,275 Mexican pesos a month, which will be delivered bimonthly

=== Benefits ===
PPE enrollees receive monetary grants every two months. In addition, the program:

- Provides monetary assistance for the enrollees' inclusion in the financial system (i.e. opening a bank account). This aid applies only to those who receive electronic bank transfers.
- Promotes social involvement by encouraging participation of beneficiaries in personal development groups, informative sessions on topics such as healthcare, human rights, etc.
- Offers social protection to its members by promoting access to healthcare services (such as those offered by Seguro Popular) and encourages the affiliation to INAPAM (which provides other benefits for the elderly)

== Program Enrollment ==
SEDESOL estimated that the total population aged 65 and over in Mexico was approximately 7.7 million in 2013. It also stated that the potential number of eligible PPE enrollees that year could range from 5.6 million to 6.2 million, depending on the source of data used (i.e. from 72.7% to 80.5% of the total population in the target age group). As of December 2013, SEDESOL reported a total of 4,248,047 beneficiaries of PPE in the country.

=== Proposals according to the OECD in 2016 ===
Mexico is among the three OECD countries that offer the lowest social pensions for people who are not covered by the contributory pension system.

The OECD on Mexico's pension systems, published in 2016, the OECD, proposes four strategies;

1.- Increase, gradually, the mandatory contributions for the pension. According to the international organization, "a replacement rate of 50% can be achieved with a probability of 75 to 90%, contributing an average of 13 to 18% over 40 years."

2.- Implement a pro-rata system to generate the transition from the old system to that of individual accounts. In this regard, the OECD recommends "smoothing" the step towards the defined contribution model in such a way that “All the rights acquired to date by the workers of the so-called 'transition generation' would be guaranteed and from then on all the workers would accumulate pension assets in the new system. Consequently, the pension benefit of a 'transition generation' worker would have two components: one based on the rights acquired under the BD formula, and the other based on the assets accumulated in the individual CD accounts.

3.- Improve the social protection network for old age through its integration and expansion. Through its study, the OECD suggests "increasing the level of non-contributory benefits in order to eradicate poverty in old age". Furthermore, it underlines the importance of the link between the non-contributory social pension (Pension for Older Adults) and the Guaranteed Minimum Pension.

4.- Homogenize the retirement savings system, which until now has been fragmented. The OECD recommends "harmonizing the rules for all pension plans, with the fundamental objective of establishing a national pension system that is the same for all Mexicans. This harmonization must include pension plans for workers in the private and public sectors, as well as special regimes (for states, municipalities, and universities, among others)".

== Challenges ==
Although noncontributory pension programs have proved effective in different countries as a strategy to reduce poverty of the elder population without social security coverage or employer-based pensions, their greatest limitation is that they are subject to government funding availability. In the case of Mexico, Levy & Schady and Aguila, note that the expected future financial burden associated with the recent expansion of the PPE in terms of geographical coverage and number of beneficiaries represents the program's main challenge. This is because the number of eligible beneficiaries will continue to rise in the upcoming years, as a result of Mexico's demographic transition. Another limitation of the PPE includes the possibility of resource "leakages" due to the enrollment of individuals that already benefit from other programs that target the elderly. Proposed measures to offset such challenges, are summarized below:

- Designing mechanisms that promote retirement savings by covering future workforce through mandatory inclusion of workers in the social security system, regardless of whether they are part of the formal or the informal sector.
- Increasing incentives to encourage the creation of a "retirement savings culture" by designing products that address vulnerable elders, and develop alternatives with preferential tax treatment.
- Identifying the number of beneficiaries that could be receiving support from other programs to quantify the amount of "leakage" of resources.
- Devise a new cost-based targeting method, that takes population growth and needs, budget constraints and the program's operation capacity into consideration.
