= Provident fund =

Provident fund is another name for pension fund. Its purpose is to provide employees with lump sum payments at the time of exit from their place of employment. This differs from pension funds, which have elements of both lump sum as well as monthly pension payments. As far as differences between gratuity and provident funds are concerned, although both types involve lump sum payments at the end of employment, the former operates as a defined benefit plan, while the latter is a defined contribution plan. Provident funds are widely used across both public and private sectors in countries where mandatory retirement savings systems are structured as defined-contribution plans. According to the Organisation for Economic Co-operation and Development (OECD), provident-fund systems such as Singapore's Central Provident Fund (CPF) and Malaysia's Employees Provident Fund (EPF) operate as compulsory defined-contribution retirement schemes, where workers and employers contribute a fixed percentage of wages to individual savings accounts that can be accessed upon retirement or under specific qualifying conditions.

Specific provident funds include:

- Employees' Provident Fund Organisation, India's statutory retirement plan
- Mandatory Provident Fund, Hong Kong's retirement plan
- Central Provident Fund, Singapore's retirement plan
- Employees Provident Fund (Malaysia), Malaysia's retirement plan
- Employees Provident Fund (Nepal), Nepal's retirement Plan
- Central Provident Fund (South Africa), a retirement trust
- Instituto del Fondo Nacional de la Vivienda para los Trabajadores, Mexico's public pension fund and largest mortgage lender
- National Social Security Fund (Kenya)
- Housing Provident Fund, China mainland's retirement plan
