= Notional defined contribution =

Type of public pension system

A notional defined contributions or non-financial defined contributions or NDC public pension system is a pension system in which contributions made by the public behave in similar way they would in most public funds. This system is implemented in several countries in Europe such as Latvia, Poland, Italy and Sweden.

== Basic idea ==
NDC is in many ways similar to classical PAYG pension scheme. Working age individuals contribute to the system and pay for the benefits of current retirees. However, NDCs are different when it comes to determining the size of the benefits. For each individual the amount contributed to this system is added to a pot which is appreciated by a rate of return. However, this rate is only notional one – set by the government based on some formula, in reality the money collected from contributions is used to finance current pension benefits. At the end of the contribution period workers receive annuity based on final financial value of their lifetime contributions, their life expectancy and expected interest rate during the remainder of their lifetime in similar way they would in defined contribution scheme.

== Features of NDCs ==
The most important aspect which distinguishes NDC systems from PAYG systems is the fact that both demographic and economic changes are reflected immediately. When the economy grows at a slower rate, the notional returns decrease and when life expectancy of population goes up it implicitly lowers the size of their annuity.

To pay for future liabilities in more difficult times, country must usually maintain a liquidity reserve.

Unlike in PAYG pension system, there is no guarantee that the worker can expect decent pension in his retirement, since it is based solely on his contributions and the notional rate of return. For this reason many countries introduced guaranteed minimal pension to their systems.

While the reason why most countries introduce NDC pension reform is to improve financial sustainability of their old age retirement systems, NDC pension systems are similar to PAYG systems with regards to the demographic pension crisis. They are financed in the same way via contributions of current working generation and therefore are still heavily influenced by population ageing.

== History of NDC pension reforms ==
NDC pension reform was first introduced in 1992 in Sweden to replace previous system based on defined benefits. It was legislated in 1994, but was not implemented until 1999 because of “Time-out” proposed by newly elected Social Democratic Party.

Italy implemented NDC reform in 1992 (the so-called Amato reform) through several parametric changes and the calculation of benefits based on lifetime income. In 1995, a complete overhaul of the NDC system was enacted. Smaller-scale changes to the pension system occurred up to 2012.

Both Italy and Sweden had similar motivation to implement reform. Both sought to reduce deficits and debt prospects as they entered the European Union and European Monetary Union, and thus had to fulfill the Maastricht criteria. They differed slightly in the specifics though. Sweden recalculated contribution history back to 1960, whereas in Italy changes were applied gradually and were limited to those newly entering the labor.

Latvia introduced reform in 1995, and implemented it in 1996. It was heavily influenced by Sweden and also sought to improve financial sustainability. However, while Sweden's main objective was fiscal sustainability, Latvia also wanted to incentivize contributions to the system. It was estimated that approximately 30-40% of earnings were unreported at the time the reform was proposed. This was expected to decrease, because NDC pension systems provide payouts based on lifetime earnings and are thus much more susceptible to misreporting of one’s income.

In Poland, the NDC pension scheme was introduced in 1996. The country faced serious fiscal challenges in terms of an untenable contribution rate; i.e., 45% of gross income. The system was implemented in 1999 after a long debate regarding its various aspects. The system was perceived as a means to reduce future pension debt and motivate workers to prolong their careers.
