= Employees Provident Fund (Nepal) =

Statutory pension fund in Nepal

Employees Provident Fund कर्मचारी सञ्चय कोष
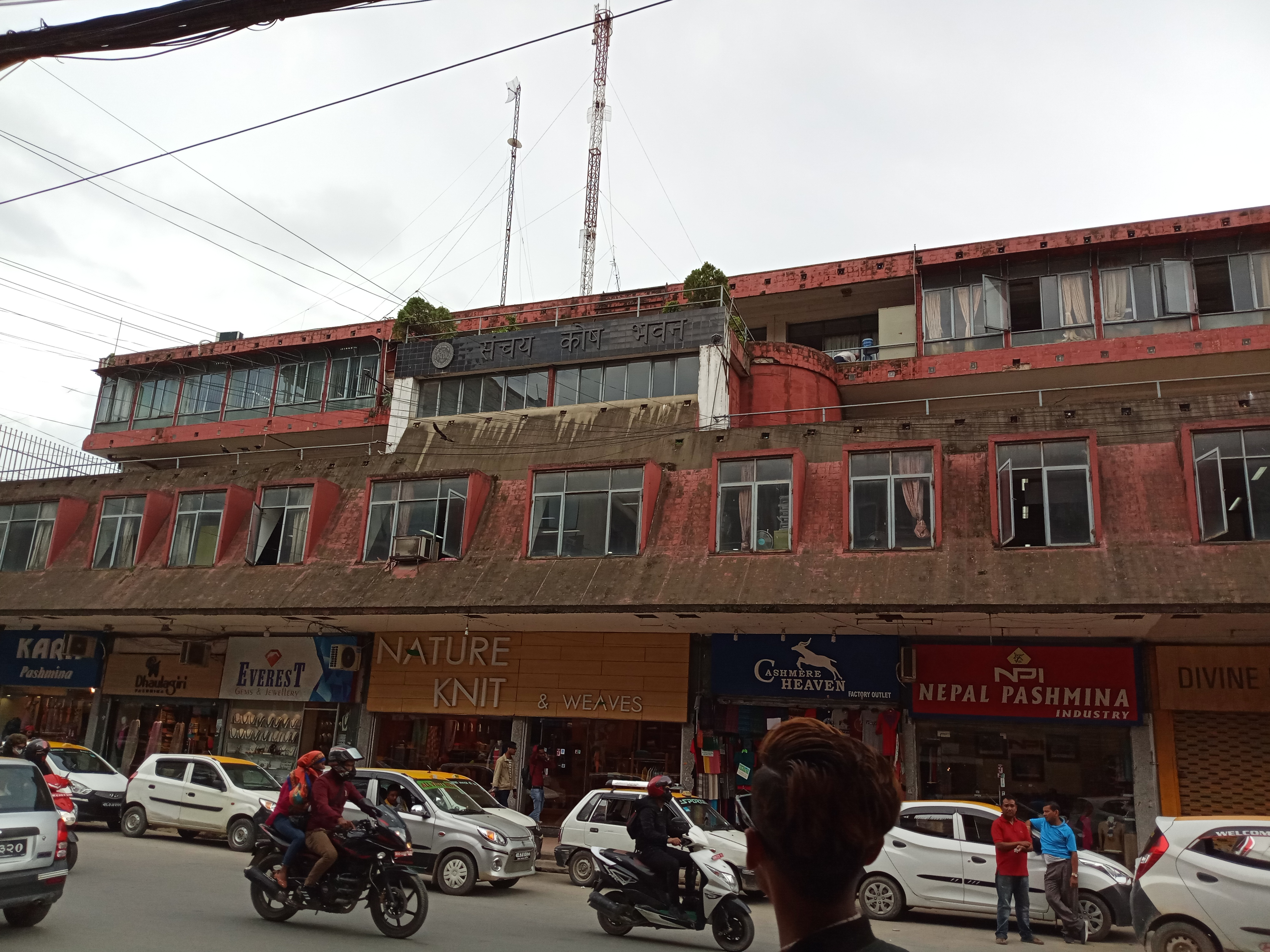
- Employee Providient Fund Building
- Industry: Provident fund
- Founded: 1962; 64 years ago, Nepal
- Headquarters: Thamel, Kathmandu, Nepal
- Key people: Mr. Dinesh Kumar Ghimire (chairman); Bijay Kumar Shrestha(CAO)
- Number of employees: 100+ (2025)
- Website: epf.org.np

Employees Provident Fund (Nepali:कर्मचारी सञ्चय कोष) Nepal is the pension fund/provident fund for employees of government and private sector of Nepal. The Fund is currently managing provident funds of 600,000 employees working for the government and in the private sector. The Fund also invests in different sectors like infrastructures and hydroelectricity. The Fund distributes its profit among depositors. Currently employees are required to contribute 10% of their basic salary (i.e. excluding bonuses) with an equal contribution from their employer to their provident fund.

== History ==
The history of Provident Fund (PF) in Nepal dates back to 1934 when the PF scheme came into existence with the establishment of Sainik Drabya Kosh (Army Provident Fund) during the Rana Regime. The scheme was initiated with the intentions of removing financial hardships to the army personnel after their retirement. Under the scheme, the army staffs were required to contribute a specific percentage of their salary to their provident fund (PF) account in Sainik Drabya Kosh.

A decade later, the scheme was broadened to cover the employees of civil services as well. A separate organization named Nijamati Provident Fund was established in 1944 to manage the scheme for civil servants working within Kathmandu. In 1948, the coverage of the scheme was extended to provide coverage to the entire civil servants working throughout the kingdom of Nepal.

In 1959, Employees' Provident Fund Department was established under the Ministry of Finance and Economic Affairs. This department was entrusted with the management of both Sainik Drabya Kosh and Nijamati Provident Fund. With this, the scope of the scheme was extended to cover all government employees including the police.

Three years after the establishment of Employees Provident Fund Department, a special Act called "Karmachari Sanchaya Kosh (or Employee's Provident Fund) Act" was legislated in the year 1962. The same year the present Karmachari Sanchaya Kosh (KSK), or Employees Provident Fund (EPF) in English, was established under the act as an autonomous provident fund Department.

After the establishment of EPF, the erstwhile Sainik Drabya Kosh, Nijamati Provident Fund and Provident Fund Department were merged into the EPF. It has been an associate member of ISSA (International Social Security Association) since 1980 A.D.

== Sources ==
- karmachari sanchaya kosh
