= Pensions in Austria =

The pensions system in Austria is composed of three parts: occupational pensions, private pensions, and state pensions. However, private and occupational pensions are secondary to the public pension issued through the state. According to the Organization for Economic Co-Operation and Development (OECD), Austria's pension system is categorized as targeted. This means that their system is set up to preferentially benefit poorer pensioners than those that are better off.

== Public pension ==
Austria introduced their uniform pension system through The Act on the Harmonisation of Austrian Pension Systems on January 1, 2005. This act provides a pension for anyone employed and under the age of 50. This uniform pension system is the reason why private and occupational pensions are second to the state pension. Austria's public (or state) pension system is a pay-as-you-go (PAYG) system. This system is funded by those currently working and employers too. Employees contribute 10.25% of their earnings to the pension system and employers contribute 12.55%. A recent reform merged the two Austrian Pension Agencies that represented blue-collar and white-collar workers into one: the Austrian Pension and Retirement Agency.

To receive the Austrian state pension a citizen must have paid contributions for at least 180 months (15 years). The longer a citizen pays, the higher their income replacement ratio is. If a worker pays into their pension for 45 years then they can receive up to 80% of their average lifetime income while retired. This is referred to as the 45 - 65 - 80 rule. When the citizen reaches retirement age (65 for men and 60 for women) they can then apply to receive their state pension. The age of retirement for women will gradually increase until it reaches 65 by 2033. Early retirement at the age of 62 was also an option until 2017. Pension benefits are based on personal income taxation and the benefits are adjusted yearly by inflation.

== Occupational pension ==
There are supplemental occupational pension plans that can be provided by employers to their staff.
The occupational pension plan that employers can provide is Pensionskassen. This pension fund is set up through a legal contract that ensures the pension fund is completely separate from the company. Large companies set up their own pension funds while smaller companies can join multi-employer pension funds. Other supplemental funds are:

- occupational collective insurance (Betriebliche Kollektivversicherung)
- internal book reserves
- support funds (Unterstützungskasse)
- direct insurance

These other funds are ways for citizens to invest in their retirement and supplemental funds to their state pension.

== Problems with the expansion of the pension system ==
Austria's public pension system is expensive and it is only becoming a larger entity. In 1970, 9.9% of the countries' gross domestic product (GDP) was attributed to public pension expenditures and that amount increased to about 14.5% in the year 2000. This is because the contributions made by employees and employers are simply not enough to cover the retirement bill. This increase in cost is attributed to many components some of which are the option of early retirement and disability pensions. Even though the retirement age is 65, the number of elderly people between ages 60 and 65 in the workforce make up only 10%. Because of these increased costs, Austria imposed reforms that mainly discouraged early retirement by withholding full pension amounts until the receiver reached age 65. The required contribution period was also extended.

Other problems that Austria faces with their pension system is the fact that people are living longer, while at the same time fertility rates are going down. Since the pension system is based on the contributions by those currently working, if the labor force goes down due to low fertility rates, then the amount of money available for pensioners is also reduced. The fact that those receiving pensions are also living longer is also responsible for the increased cost. As a result, the ratio of elderly people to those working and contributing to the pension fund will more than double within the next 30 years.

== Reforms ==
The 2003 Austrian Pension Reform had five main elements aimed at lowering the burden of the pension fund on the state.

1. Discouraging and ending early retirement completely by 2017.
2. Encouraging late retirement with incentives for those working past age 65. Those who worked past the retirement age were rewarded with 4.2 percent in bonuses per year.
3. Increasing the contribution period average from 15 to 40 years. Before this reform, the amount received by pensioners would be the average of the income over the best 15 years. With this reform, the period was increased to 40 because the average of 40 years would be lower than 15 years, therefore decreasing the benefits.
4. Increasing the contribution period necessary to receive a full pension from 40 to 45 years.
5. The reform established a hardship fund, created to help those with pension payments lower than €1,000/month and have contributed for at least 30 years.

== See also ==
- Germany Pensions
- US Pensions
- UK Pensions
- Denmark Pensions
- Austria
