= Pensions in France =

Average effective age of retirement for men, 1970 to 2018. France has one of the lowest effective retirement ages in Europe.

In France, pensions fall into five major divisions;

- Non-contributory minimum pension
- Mandatory state pension provision (first pillar)
- Mandatory occupational pension provision (second pillar)
- Voluntary private collective pension provision (third pillar)
- Voluntary private individual pension provision (third pillar).

According to the DREES, social protection expenditure related to pensions in France (old-age and survivors' benefits) amounted to €359 billion in 2020, €365 billion in 2021, €382 billion in 2022, and €400 billion in 2023 (14.2% of GDP). In 2023, France ranked third among OECD countries in pension expenditure as a share of GDP, behind Italy and Greece.

== Non-contributory minimum pension ==
This minimum pension (French: Allocation de solidarité aux personnes âgées) is the first level of the first pillar of the French pension system. The ASPA is a monthly benefit paid to low-income seniors, whether or not they are former employees. It is not a retirement pension: it is financed by the State, not by social contributions. It is a "social minimum", like the RSA (revenu de solidarité active). Since January 1, 2006, it has replaced the multiple components of the minimum old-age pension or the "Minimum vieillesse" in french. This pension is paid by the CNAV, the Caisse Nationale d'Assurance Vieillesse, the French social security organization that manages the basic pension; or by the MSA, the agricultural social security, when the elderly person depends on the agricultural system. This minimum pension is targeted to ensure that individuals with low salary contributions during their working lives can receive a base level of pension. The mechanism for this is the minimum contributory pension (minimum contribution), which ensures that retirees receive a minimum monthly pension if their basic pension is below a certain threshold. As of early 2024, the monthly ceiling for personal pensions required to qualify for the minimum contributive pension was revised to €1,367.51 following a rise in the SMIC (minimum wage). This adjustment ensures that the sum of the primary and supplementary pension does not exceed this ceiling, aligning retirees' total pensions to the new amount if they are entitled to the minimum contributive pension.

=== Conditions of attributions ===
There are several conditions for receiving this pension:

- The recipient must be able to demonstrate that they regularly reside in France; if they are a foreign national, they must also fulfill additional requirements.
- The beneficiary must be at least 65 years old (except in special cases where the criterion is lowered to the minimum legal retirement age).
- Finally, the beneficiary must not exceed a certain level of resources. To evaluate this, all professional income, property income, retirement pensions, disability pensions and the AAH adult disability allowance must be taken into account. The ceiling not to be exceeded is re-evaluated every year. In 2022, this ceiling is set at 11,001.44 euros per year for a single person (916.78 euros per month) and 17,079.77 euros per year (1,423.31 euros per month) for a couple.

=== Amount of the allowance ===
The amount of the ASPA is calculated by taking into account the difference between the required resource ceiling and your income. In 2022, the maximum amount of the allowance is 11,001.44 euros per year for a single person (916.78 euros per month) and 17,079.77 euros per year for a couple (1,423.31 euros per month). When a beneficiary receives other income, it is deducted from the ASPA.

=== Recovery of the allocated sums ===
The ASPA is not a simple allowance, it must be seen as an advance from the state: a recovery of the allocated sums can take place in the form of a levy on the eventual inheritance (if the amount of the inheritance exceeds 39,000 euros of net assets). The ASPA, therefore, has a redistributive character among recipients.

==== Minimum Old Age pension ====
The expression "minimum old-age pension" (French: Minimum vieillesse) corresponds to a former allowance that no longer exists, but it is still used in everyday language to designate the ASPA The minimum old-age pension was created in 1956 and replaces the old workers' allowance AVTS of 1942. The objective is close to that of the ASPA. Unlike the ASPA, however, the minimum old-age pension is made up of different allowances (and not a single allowance in the case of the ASPA). The conditions for obtaining this benefit are similar to those of the ASPA; in particular, since the law of May 1998, which eliminates all nationality requirements.

This allowance is divided into two levels:

1. The first-tier allowance guarantees the recipient a minimum income equivalent to the amount of the AVTS.
2. The second level allowance is a supplementary allowance.

== Mandatory state pension provision ==
The mandatory state pension is an unfunded contributory pension based on the redistribution of contributions from those working to those in retirement. The scheme aims to provide up to a maximum of 50% of the retiree's income during their 25 highest earning years up to the Plafond de la sécurité sociale (€41,136 annually in 2022).

The state scheme is financed by a payroll tax known as "social security contributions". The rate in 2013 is 15.15% (8.4% for the employer and 6.75% for the employee) of pay up to the social security contribution ceiling of €37,032, and 1.7% (1.6% for the employer and 0.1% for the employee) on the remainder of the salary. Management of the scheme is the responsibility of the Caisse Nationale d'Assurance Vieillesse (National Old-age Insurance Bank).

The mandatory state pension in France operates on a pay-as-you-go basis, redistributing contributions from current workers to retirees. It aims to provide 50% of a retiree's income based on their 25 highest earning years, up to a set ceiling (€41,136 annually in 2022). The pension system is funded through social security contributions, which in 2013 consisted of a total rate of 15.15%—8.4% by employers and 6.75% by employees—up to a contribution ceiling of €37,032, with an additional 1.7% on salaries above this amount.

In 2024, the French mandatory state pension scheme will continue to be financed through employer and employee contributions to social security, which cover various aspects of social welfare, including pensions. The overall contribution for old-age insurance, crucial for funding the pension system, is 15.45% of salaries up to the social security ceiling. This total is split between employers, 8.55%, and employees, 6.90%. For earnings above this ceiling, the contribution rate for old-age insurance is lower, at 2.42%, with employers paying 2.02% and employees paying 0.40. In addition, there is a 0.3% employee-only contribution to the Solidarity Autonomy Fund (CSA), which supports autonomy for older people. The General Social Contribution (CSG), another significant payroll deduction, is split into deductible and non-deductible parts at rates of 6.8% and 2.4%, respectively, complemented by a 0.5% Contribution for the Repayment of Social Debt (CRDS).

== Mandatory occupational pension provision ==
The mandatory occupational pension is a defined contribution scheme that is mainly based on redistribution, but also has elements of investment. The aim of the schemes is to supplement the state pension increasing income of retirees from the 50% level to between 70% and 80%.

There are several schemes, the main ones being: – Arrco (for non-managers) – Agirc (for managers) – Ircantec (for civil servants) One third of this contribution is paid by the employee and the other two-thirds by the employer.

Contributor	Income levied	Agirc	Arrco	Ircantec
Elderly employee	First tranche of income	3%	none	1.5%
Elderly employee	Second tranche of income	8%	7.7%	4.76%
Employer	First tranche of income	4.5%	none	3%
Employer	Second tranche of income	12%	12.6%	9.24%

- First Tranche is up to €35,000 in 2011

The schemes pay out based on a points system. The schemes are managed so that they are non-loss making. Surpluses are invested and are maintained as a reserve fund. This reserve fund amounts to approximately €50 billion in 2010. Both Arrco and Agirc are state administered pensions but managed by a private provider. As such they may affect pensions in other countries. For example, pension payments from both Agirc and Arrco must be declared in New Zealand and are abated from the New Zealand "superannuation" provided by the New Zealand Government. They would also have to be declared in Australia, as income or an overseas pension, but would affect Australian super or pension entitlements.

== Voluntary private provision ==
=== Collective plans ===
The collective retirement savings plans (plan d'épargne pour la retraite collectif) were introduced by François Fillon in 2006. They are company plans that enable employees to get tax credits when they contribute to these funds.

Employee contributions are strictly regulated. The following is a list of the sources of funds that may be used to contribute tax-free to these funds:

- Bonuses
- Profit sharing
- Voluntary payments up to 25% of total gross earnings
- Company contributions up to 16% of the social security limit (€35,000 in 2011)
- Transfers from other company savings schemes

All the contributions (employee and employer) are not considered as income for income tax purposes. At retirement the capital is not taxable (income tax), however, the annuities are taxable as income.

=== Individual plans ===
The retirement savings account plans (plan d'épargne retraite populaire) were created in 2004. 10% of annual income may be invested tax-free in these individual funds.

== Pensions Reserve Fund ==
The Pensions Reserve Fund (Fonds de réserve pour les retraites) was set up in July 2001 with the aim of using funds from privatisations of state holdings to finance the future shortfall of the state PAYG system. The target was to create a fund totaling €150 billion by 2020. As of September 2010, the total funds managed by the fund amounted to €35.7 billion.

In recent updates, as of 2023, the Pensions Reserve Fund (FRR) achieved a net performance of +9.68%, reflecting a solid recovery in stock markets and effective management amid fluctuating interest rates. This performance is part of the FRR's broader strategy to secure the financial sustainability of France's PAYG pension system, which has significantly evolved from its initial funding via state privatizations. The fund continues to adapt its investment approach, focusing on sustainable and responsible investments, aligning with its original purpose of bridging future pension shortfalls.

== See also ==
- French special retirement plan
- Social Security in France
- Workers and Farmers Pensions

International:

- Pan-European Pension
- Retirement age, international comparison

Protests:

- 2010 French pension reform strikes

== Bibliography ==
- Jean-Pierre Thiollet, Bien préparer son départ à la retraite, Vuibert, 2002. ISBN 978-2711787517
