= Universities Superannuation Scheme =

Pension scheme for UK academic and related staff

- USS logo
- Industry: Pension scheme
- Predecessor: Federated Superannuation Scheme for Universities
- Founded: 1 April 1974; 52 years ago in Liverpool, United Kingdom
- Headquarters: Liverpool, UK
- Products: University pensions
- Total assets: ▲£89.6bn (2021); £67bn (2019); (February 2022)
- Members: 460,000 (2021)
- Website: www.uss.co.uk

The Universities Superannuation Scheme is a pension scheme in the United Kingdom with £89.6 billion under management as of August 2021 (up from £67 billion in 2019). It has over 400,000 members, made up of active and retired academic and academic-related staff (including senior administrative staff) mostly from those universities established prior to 1992 (staff in the post-1992 universities are mostly members of the Teacher's Pension Scheme). In 2006, it was the second largest private pension scheme in the UK by fund size. The headquarters of Universities Superannuation Scheme Limited (USS) are in Liverpool.

== History ==
=== The Federated Superannuation Scheme for Universities, 1913–1974 ===
In 1911 the President of the Board of Education established an Advisory Committee on University Grants. This research formed the basis of the predecessor of USS, the Federated Superannuation System for Universities, which was approved by the Board of Education and membership became compulsory for new appointees post 1 October 1913. The basic plan criteria were:

- The benefit was an annuity or cash payment through an insurance policy maturing at age 60.
- Optionally, benefits were available for dependants on death in service.
- The policy was held in trust by the member's institution and was transferable to a new institution if required or to an individual on leaving the University service.
- Members contributed 5% of salary and the employer matched this until 1920 when the employer contribution was increased to 10%.
- Administrative staff on salaries comparable to academic staff were also eligible to join.

However, perceived drawbacks of the scheme were that it did not link to final pay, access was contingent on a medical examination, there was no guarantee for dependents, little provision for risk benefits, and no indexation of benefits. It compared unfavourably to the defined benefit scheme introduced for school teachers under the School Teachers (Superannuation) Act 1918. From 1958 to 1969 several committees were established to review the present arrangements. The recommendations for a defined benefit scheme were initially rejected by universities in 1960 and again by a committee in 1964, who concluded it was "unable to make a clear recommendation in favour of either system".

=== Universities Superannuation Scheme, 1974–2011 ===
In 1969, a joint consultative committee (JCC) for the reform of FSSU was established, and commissioned a report from Geoffrey Heywood (the FSSU consulting actuary) that included a proposed outline for USS. It was to be a one-eightieth scheme with a three times annuity lump sum, available to new entrants only. No medical examination was required and pensions would not be increased.

A meeting to discuss the structure of USS took place in Liverpool on 28 December 1970. The proposal for an independent company was approved by the JCC in November 1971, and endorsed by the Committee of Vice-Chancellors and Principals in December 1971. The FSSU Executive Committee was "unenthusiastic". Drafting of the rules began in 1971, with the seventh draft being agreed in August 1973 and circulated to universities along with an explanatory booklet. The scheme was finally introduced on 1 April 1975. The scheme was a 'balance of cost' scheme in which the sponsors bear the risk of default, and specifically a 'last-man-standing multi-employer scheme', meaning that if an employer collapsed, the others would bear its responsibilities to its pensioners, such that 'default would require the bankruptcy of every institution, that is, the collapse of the UK university and research community'. Combined with extensive state funding of the higher education sector, this has been thought to make the risk of default very low. In the 2020s, the risk of stronger employers leaving the scheme lead to proposals for a moratorium on departures.

At the scheme's inception, contributions were 16% of salary, with employers paying 10%, and members paying 6% plus a 2% surcharge aimed at covering benefits for service prior to the scheme's inception. From 1983 to 1997, the employers' contribution rate increased to 18.55%. From January 1997 to September 2009 it decreased to 14%, and employee contribution reduced to 6.35%. The employer contribution was increased to 16% in October 2009.

The defined benefit of the scheme was to consist of a one-time cash lump sum of 3/80 of the final salary and an annual income of 1/80 of retiree's final salary, both multiplied by years of contributions. For purposes of calculation, the final salary was revalued each year in line with inflation.

From its inception, USS was the main pension scheme for UK academics and senior administrative staff of universities and similar higher-education or research institutions. This predominance was lessened, however, when the Further and Higher Education Act 1992 created numerous 'new universities', whose employees (old and new) remained in the state-run Teachers' Pension Scheme. From 10 December 1999, any employee of a UK higher education institution became eligible to join USS if they wished.

By 2014, USS had become the UK's second-largest pension scheme, with 316,440 active members, deferred pensioners and pensioners. It was, by this measure, the world's 36th-largest. 374-79 separate institutions participated in the scheme, and its assets were valued at £42 billion. In 2017 it had 190,546 active members.

=== Changes of 2011 ===
Few changes to USS's rules were made until October 2011, when dramatic changes were implemented, partly in response to losses resulting from the Great Recession, and consequent increased projected scheme deficit:

- USS closed its final salary scheme to new members, replacing it with a career average revalued earnings (CARE) scheme for new members.
- The retirement age was linked to the UK state retirement age.
- Contribution rates for members still in the final salary section rose from 6.35% to 7.5%.
- The scheme changed from being 'balance-of-cost' (in which sponsors are ultimately responsible for meeting promised pensions) to a 'cap-and-share' rule, in which extra contributions would, if necessary, be met 35% by members and 65% by sponsors.
- The indexation of deferred pensions and pensions in payment was changed from the retail price index to the less generous consumer price index, and uprating of accrued benefits was capped.

The changes were the subject of 'heated public controversy' between USS's institutional sponsors and the scheme's members, represented by the University and College Union, and involved lengthy industrial action. Researchers did find, however, that 'the pre-October 2011 scheme was not viable in the long run', whereas the post-October 2011 scheme was 'probably viable in the long run', though it faced medium-term problems as the effects of the changes on the state of the fund would take time to be felt.

Subsequent research found that reductions in payout reduced the effective value of making (pre-tax contributions) to USS pension versus having to make after-tax contributions to a private savings by £2.86 billion (£1.86 billion attributable to loss of value for the member contribution and the rest in loss of return to members from the employer contribution). Whereas young members joining the pre-2011 scheme could expect their net wealth to increase by £181,000 (£133,000 gross) relative to opting out of the scheme, those joining the post-2011 CARE section could expect a much smaller increase: £98,000 (£46,000 gross). An earlier study by the same researchers concluded that the reduced wealth of post-2011 entrants was equivalent to an 11% drop in their total compensation or a 13% drop in their salaries. The researchers nonetheless found that the scheme remained attractive.

=== Changes of 2016 ===
Despite the changes of 2011, USS continued to identify deficits based on weak prospects of future investment performance leading to further negotiations, industrial action, and, eventually, substantial changes being implemented in April 2016. The key changes were:

- The final-salary pension scheme available to members who had joined before the 2011 changes was closed. Benefits previously accrued were protected, but frozen at a level relating to an employee's salary as of March 2016 (uprated annually by inflation).
- All active members were entered into the CARE scheme (see above).
- Employee contributions rose to 8% and employer contributions from 16% to 18% of salary.
- Defined benefit accrual was raised from one eightieth to one seventy-fifth of pensionable salary.
- Defined benefits were limited to the first £55,000 of salary. Earnings over £55,000 contributed to a defined contribution scheme. Employees receive only 12% of the 18% salary employer contribution into this DC component, with 6% diverted from the higher earner's pension toward paying down the scheme deficit. Staff had the option of making an additional 1% payment which would be matched by the employer.

=== Changes and disputes, 2018–2021 ===
By 2017, the scheme had over 400,000 members. The USS scheme reported a technical deficit of £17.5 billion in July 2017, reported as the largest such shortfall in the UK at that time. Under diverse conventional accounting rules, the scheme had been in deficit for several years (see Figure). This varies depending on the rules used. For instance as of March 2010, the actuary estimated the scheme was 91% funded (£3.1 billion deficit) according to the scheme specific funding regime, 80% funded on an FRS17 basis, and 57% funded on a buy-out basis.

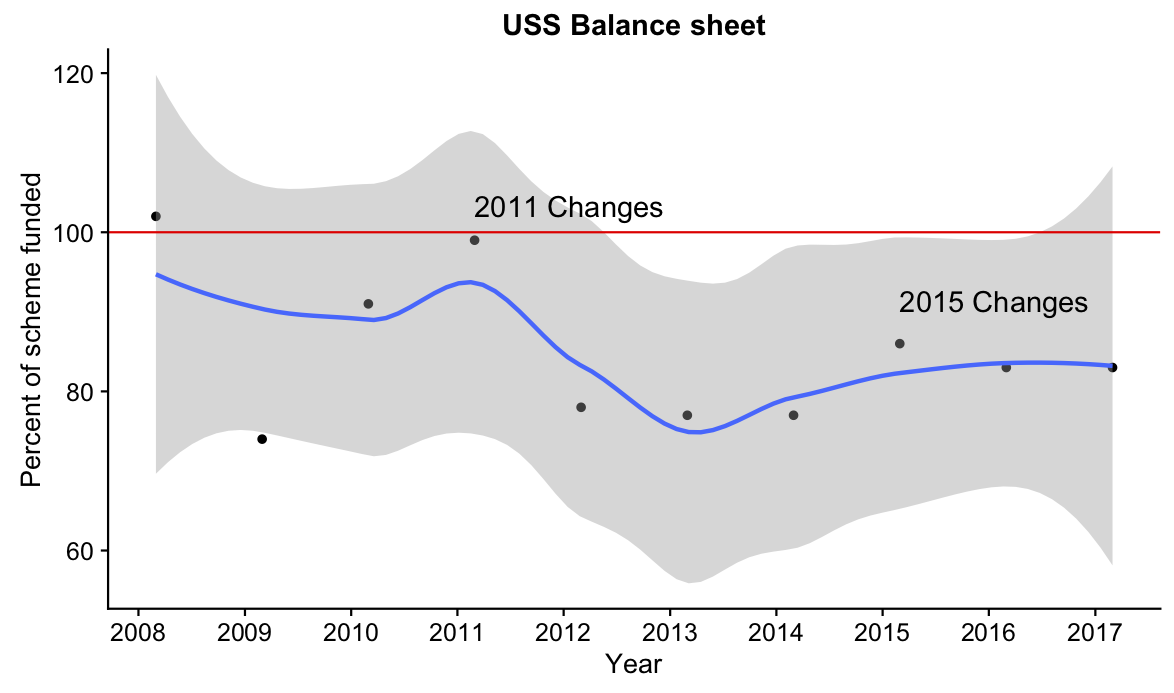
USS pension scheme fund percent funding 2008-2017.

The USS Joint Negotiating Committee therefore made the following proposals, to be introduced after 1 April 2019:

- The defined benefits section of the scheme would close (with a possibility of reintroducing it). All future benefits (apart from death in service and ill health retirement benefits) would be transferred to the defined contribution (DC) scheme.
- Member contributions would remain at 8%. Members would gain an option of paying in only 4% while still receiving the full employer contribution. The employer match of the first 1% of any voluntary employee savings would be lost. Members’ contributions would include a contribution to finance death in service and ill-health retirement benefits.
- Employer contributions would remain at 18%. Of this 13.25% would build employee DC pension pots, with the other 4.75% used for deficit recovery (plus management and running costs).

UCU, whose objections to these proposals had been overruled, proceeded to ballot successfully for industrial action in an attempt to secure a more favourable settlement for members, leading to the 2018 USS pension dispute.

==== 2019 Scheme cost increases ====
Following the 2018 strike action, contributions from employees and employers increased substantially: Member contributions increased, initially from 8% to 8.8% of salary. Then from 1 October 2019, to 9.6%. Subject to review, this is planned to increase to 11% from 1 October 2021. Corresponding employer contributions increased from 18% to 19.5%, then (from 1 October) to 21.1%, with a planned increase to 23.7% planned for 2021. For members earning over the salary cap (c. £58,000), employer contribution dropped to 12% for earnings above this threshold, with the difference (about 9% of salary) being used to pay down the overall scheme deficit.

==== 2019 exit by Trinity College, Cambridge ====
On 15 March 2019, in a move that came to be dubbed 'Trexit' (an allusion to Brexit), the Council of Trinity College, Cambridge voted to withdraw the college unilaterally from USS as of 31 May 2019, replacing the USS scheme with a defined benefits scheme, to avoid the college bearing responsibility for other pensions in the UK higher education system in the event of foreclosures in the sector. The buyout reportedly cost the college £30m. The move prompted some Cambridge academics to boycott supervising Trinity College students, with over 450 Cambridge academics pledging to withdraw all labour from the college by 19 June. Cambridge University's graduate student union supported the boycott, discouraging postgraduate students from taking up teaching for Trinity. The General Secretary elect of UCU, Jo Grady, published an open letter calling on the college's fellows to change their course, arguing that to do so was in their interest and the interest of the USS pension scheme generally.

On 21 June 2019, Trinity's fellows voted by 73 votes to 46 to leave USS. In October "several" fellows, including the historian Alexandra Walsham, resigned their fellowships. Reportedly 550 Cambridge staff opted out of discretionary work with Trinity, and Trinity students began to report difficulty finding supervisors. Protests were staged at the inauguration of Trinity's new master, Sally Davies. The University and College Union considered a boycott. In February 2020, Arundhati Roy had cancelled her Clark Lecture in English literature at the request of Cambridge UCU, supplying it for publication in written form instead. In the wake of Trinity's departure from the scheme, the Covenant Advisor to the USS Trustee, PwC, advised that the covenant remained strong but would now be placed on 'negative watch', with the threat that it might be downgraded to 'tending to strong' should another employer exit from the scheme. By May 2021, the USS Trustee was said to have become 'inordinately concerned' with the risk that other employers might follow Trinity's lead, and this prompted the employers' organisation, Universities UK (UUK), to formulate proposals for a 20-year moratorium on departures.

==== 2021 negotiations ====
Without change, the planned contributions for 2022 would rise to at least 28.5% (from 23.7% in October 2021) for employers and from 11% to at least 13.6% for employees. In an effort to conclude the 2020 valuation in accordance with the pensions regulator and other parties, employers offered a plan in which contributions would not increase, but the DB salary cap would be lowered to £40,000 (down from £60,000) and accrual would reduce from 1/75 to 1/85. In two further changes, it was suggested that institutions would lose the option of leaving USS and that inflation indexing of pensions would be capped at 2.5% and that indexing would be conditional on circumstances. Such conditional indexation may be seen by the regulator as non-binding and thus would increase the solvency of the scheme by significantly lowering liabilities. Around 20% of university academics have opted out of the scheme, prompting the suggestion of lower tiers of membership to stem this flow.

In September 2021, an independent analysis under the auspices of the National Institute of Economic and Social Research found that although the most likely future outcome was that USS's assets would meet or exceed the obligations of the fund, there was "a significant probability – often 30% or more – that assets would run out before all pensions have been paid". The authors encouraged a more public debate about risk-appetite and risk-sharing among USS stakeholders, and as strike action on the issue from 1–3 December unfolded, intense debates unfolded in the pages of publications such as the Financial Times, Times Higher Education, and elsewhere. Debate continued with the publication of a working paper, one of whose authors was a UCU negotiator, that argued that UUK had underestimated the likely losses of cuts to the USS scheme implemented in April 2022.

=== Cuts of 2022 ===
In February 2022, the following cuts were imposed to take effect from April 2022 (with the exception of indexation):

- Accrual rate cut for defined benefits from 1/75 to 1/85 of salary. (The lump sum payment remained at three years of pension benefits immediately on retirement.)
- The DB/DC threshold was lowered from around £60,000 to £40,000. Income up to the DB/DC threshold is used to calculate the amount of defined benefits. 20% of income above the threshold is put in the defined contribution pot.
- Inflation indexation remained at CPI if CPI is at least 0% and less than or equal to 5%, 5% plus half the difference between CPI and 5% if CPI is between 5% and 15%, and 10% if CPI is above 15%. From April 2026, indexation will be capped at 2.5%; that is, it is will be CPI if CPI is at least 0% and less than or equal to 2.5%, and will be set at 2.5% if CPI is above 2.5%. It remains the case that if CPI is negative, pensions will not fall.
- Employee contributions increased from 9.6% to 9.8%. Employer contributions rose to 21.6% of salary.

In November 2021, two academics, Dr Neil Davies and Dr Ewan McGaughey, commenced legal action in McGaughey and Davies v USS Ltd, crowd-funded to the tune of over £50,000 by around 1,500 USS members, against the USS directors, accusing the trustee directors of abuse of power towards scheme beneficiaries and seeking to halt proposed pension cuts and push divestment from fossil fuel companies. Although an initial court order rejected the claim, a High Court hearing on February 28 2022 allowed the claim to proceed. On 5 April, however, the High Court dismissed the claim; the claimants declared that they would appeal this decision. After the claimants won leave to the Court of Appeal in November 2022, USS announced that it would reverse the cuts to pensions it had previously approved.

=== Improvements of 2024 ===
In 2024, a range of improvements to the scheme were announced, adopting the JNC’s proposal proposed benefit and contribution changes

- Contributions reduced: From 1 January 2024, contributions reduced from 9.8% of salary to 6.1% for members and from 21.6% to 14.5% for employers.
- One off bonus: On 1 April 2024, a one-off £215 uplift to the annual value, plus a £645 lump sum boost were applied.
- Increased accrual: From 1 April 2024 the defined benefit pension annual accrual increased to 1/75 of salary for pension and 3/75 for lump sum benefit (up from 1/85 of salary below the threshold and 3/85 of salary as a lump sum on retirement.
- Increased salary threshold: The salary threshold increased substantially, from £41,004 to £70,308, shifting pension input, preserving defined benefits for higher earners. Also, the threshold link to CPI inflation increased, to a cap of 10%, up from 2.5%.
- Inflation protection: The defined benefit part of the pension increases inline with CPI inflation each year, both before and after retirement. The maximum annual increase was raised to 10% (from 2.5%), with a full match up to CPI of 5%, half of any increase up to 15%, capped at 10%.

=== Capita cyberattack ===
On 12 May 2023, the USS admitted that a cyberattack on its outsourced administration provider Capita had exposed "the personal data of about half a million members". Members were offered an Experian credit monitoring account to monitor their data security.

== Management and investments ==
The scheme publishes detailed annual reports, available online. Returns on the portfolio over 5 years to 31 March 2019 were an annualised 10.09% per yr. However, returns for the 5 years to 31 March 2025 were -0.1% annualised, "significantly outperform[ing]" estimated liabilities.

Through the 1990s and into 2020, the fund's main asset classes were UK, European and US equities; US and UK bonds; UK property; and cash. USS's liabilities are all in sterling and, from April 2006, USS began hedging all foreign exchange risk (having previously hedged none).

In 2019, the largest asset classes were Listed Shares (40.92%), Other private markets (21%), Index-linked bonds (19.84%) with smaller holdings in fixed income (8.55%), property (5.51%), government bonds (4.85%) and cash (4.49%). The fund is underweight US equities. A decade earlier (2011), the distributions were: 60% equities (UK 23.06%, EU 18.32%, US 18.32%), cash (5%), 10-year UK government bonds (12.3%), UK property (7%), hedge funds (8%), and commodities (8%).

Commercial assets have included Telford Shopping Centre in Telford, Shropshire (sold to Hark Group and Apollo Real Estate), and the Grand Arcade development in Cambridge and Forestside Shopping Centre, Belfast. The latter was bought from Sainsbury's for £50 million in 1998 and sold in 2001 for £70 million. They currently own Moto Hospitality. In 2013, Australian train operator Airtrain Citylink was purchased.

The scheme had investment costs of .34% in 2019 (compared to 0.32% (32 basis points) total annual administration costs of £124.9m in 2017), and pension administration costs of £69 per member.

In July 2023, it was announced that after more than a decade in deficit the scheme has swung into a surplus of £7.4 billion. This was credited with cutting the pensions bill of UK universities by hundreds of millions of pounds.

=== Criticisms ===
In 1997, following a sustained People & Planet campaign named 'Ethics for USS', USS established a policy on responsible investment, including appointing an advisor on the issue. The scheme came under renewed pressure from 2015, via the 'USS: Step Up' campaign, which had noted investments in tobacco and fossil fuels. As of 2019, USS offers four ethical investment options. Around 8% of members had taken advantage of these.

In 2017, it was reported that the USS pension scheme has offshore investments in tax havens. In 2014, USS's highest-paid executive, received a 50% pay increase, to £900,000 and criticism of the high pay of top USS employees grew. In 2018, it was noted that pay for USS's chief executive rose from £484,000 in 2017 to £566,000 in 2018, while two staff members earned over £1m, and running costs stood at £125m per annum.

In 2021, the scheme made a pledge to pursue responsible investments that would be consistent with achieving net-zero carbon emissions by 2050, but continued to attract criticism from Ethics for USS, which was concerned that the plans were too vague and timid.

USS data shows that in the period between March 2020 to June 2021, the number of USS investments in fossil fuel companies increased from 30 to over 50. (Note: Defined as those in the Carbon Underground 200 or the Carbon Majors top 50 polluters listings.) New additional investments included the three of the top ten US shale oil producers that USS didn't already hold, (Note: These are Chevron, ConocoPhillips, Continental Resources, Diamondback Energy, EOG, ExxonMobil, Marathon Oil, Occidental, Ovintiv, and Pioneer Natural Resources.) plus three of the world's four biggest fracking companies. (Note: These are Baker Hughes, Schlumberger, Halliburton, and FTS International.)

USS pursues a policy of "engagement" with fossil fuel companies as part of its responsible investment aims. It has had large shareholdings in Shell for many years. At each Shell annual general meeting between 2017 and 2021, USS has voted with the company against shareholder motions calling for emissions targets aligned with the Paris Climate Agreement.

In February 2024, USS was criticised by the University and College Union (UCU) for its investment links to the state of Israel. Whilst USS shared calls for "a rapid end to the current violence in the Middle East", UCU claimed that the USS had not carried out a review of its investments, and instead stated that it would continue to "consider [its] legal duty to invest in the best financial interests of [...] members and beneficiaries".

In June 2024, USS was pressed by university staff members to explain why it had invested in UK utility company Thames Water (USS holds almost 20% of the company's shares). USS had first invested in Thames Water in 2017 and expanded its stake in 2021, despite Thames Water's mounting financial problems. USS had written-down the value of its shareholding £956mn to £364mn in the year to March 2023.

== See also ==
- UK pensions
- UK labour law
- Teachers' Pension Scheme
