= Career average pension =

Occupational pension scheme

Career average pension is a type of occupational defined benefit pension scheme in which a member's retirement income is based on an average of their earnings over the period they are an active member of the scheme rather than only on their pay at or near retirement. The slice of pension earned in each year is calculated from that year's pensionable pay and then increased, or revalued, up to retirement in line with an agreed measure of prices or earnings. In the United Kingdom the term is widely used for public service pension schemes that were reformed in the mid 2010s to provide benefits on a career average revalued earnings basis instead of a final salary basis.

== Definition and overview ==
A career average pension is an occupational defined benefit pension scheme in which the pension a member receives in retirement is related to both their earnings during periods of scheme membership and the length of time they belong to the scheme. Benefits are based on earnings averaged across the member's career rather than mainly on salary close to retirement. In a career average design the scheme calculates, for each scheme year, an amount of pension earned from that year's pensionable earnings, using an accrual rate set out in the rules. This yearly amount of pension is recorded in the member's pension record or notional pension account.

The term career average revalued earnings (CARE) reflects the fact that the pension earned in each year is normally increased, or revalued, between the year in which it is earned and retirement. Revaluation is usually carried out in line with a measure of price inflation or earnings growth so that amounts earned earlier in a member's career keep their value over time. At retirement, the revalued yearly pension amounts are added together to determine the member's total annual pension under the scheme.

Career average pensions sit alongside traditional final salary schemes within the broader category of defined benefit pensions. In a final salary scheme the pension is usually based on pensionable pay near the end of the member's career and the number of years of service. Both career average and final salary schemes promise an income in retirement that does not depend directly on investment returns on an individual fund, in contrast with defined contribution arrangements where the outcome depends on contributions and investment performance.

== Operation ==
In a typical career average revalued earnings pension scheme, a member builds up pension year by year while they are an active member of the scheme. For a given scheme year, the pension earned is calculated by applying the scheme's accrual rate, for example one eightieth or one sixtieth, to that year's pensionable earnings. The result is an amount of annual pension that can be thought of as a slice of the member's eventual pension, and it is added to the member's pension account.

After it has been earned, the pension credited for each year is normally increased, or revalued, up to retirement. Depending on scheme rules and any statutory requirements, revaluation may follow a measure of price inflation such as the consumer price index or the growth in average earnings. The intention is that pension amounts earned earlier in a career maintain their value in real or relative terms.

When a member takes their pension, the revalued pension amounts for each year of membership are added together to determine the total annual pension payable under the scheme. For example, in a simple career average scheme with an accrual rate of one sixtieth, pensionable earnings of £24,000 in one year would give an additional annual pension of £400 for that year before revaluation. That £400 would then be increased each year in line with the scheme's chosen revaluation measure, and the revalued amount would be combined with the pension earned in other years to give the member's overall pension.

Many career average schemes also provide increases to pensions after they have come into payment, often linked to price inflation, although the level and structure of such increases vary between schemes and may be influenced by legislation. As with other defined benefit pensions, most of the investment and longevity risk is borne by the scheme and its sponsoring employer or state rather than by the individual member.

== Use in the United Kingdom ==
In the United Kingdom, career average revalued earnings schemes are closely associated with reforms to public service pensions in the early twenty first century. The Independent Public Service Pensions Commission chaired by Lord Hutton of Furness recommended in 2011 that most existing final salary public service schemes should be replaced for future service by new schemes based on career average revalued earnings, which it argued would be fairer between members with different earnings patterns and more sustainable for taxpayers. The government accepted this approach in principle and legislated through the Public Service Pensions Act 2013 for a common framework within which new career average schemes could be created for the main public service workforces.

Under this framework, new career average schemes for local government workers, National Health Service staff, teachers, civil servants, members of the armed forces, police officers and firefighters were introduced from 2014 and 2015. For example, the Local Government Pension Scheme in England and Wales moved from a final salary to a career average design for service from 1 April 2014, while new career average sections of the NHS Pension Scheme, Teachers' Pension Scheme and Civil Service Pension Scheme took effect in April 2015. After these changes, most major UK public service pension schemes base new benefits on career average earnings, although they differ in accrual rates, revaluation rules and whether they are funded or unfunded.

The reforms included transitional protection that allowed many older members to remain in legacy final salary sections for a period after 2015. In 2018 the Court of Appeal held in the McCloud v Ministry of Justice and related cases that these arrangements were unlawfully age discriminatory. The government then decided that all active members would build up new benefits only in the reformed career average schemes from 1 April 2022, and legislated for a remedy covering service in the period 2015 to 2022 in the Public Service Pensions and Judicial Offices Act 2022. The remedy alters how past service is treated for affected members, but it does not reverse the move to career average revalued earnings as the basis for accruing new public service pension benefits.

== Advantages and criticisms ==
Supporters of career average schemes argue that they can provide a fairer distribution of pension benefits between members with different patterns of pay progression while retaining the security of a defined benefit structure. The Independent Public Service Pensions Commission chaired by Lord Hutton concluded that schemes based on career average earnings could be fairer to workers with low or moderate salary growth than traditional final salary schemes, because benefits reflect earnings across the whole period of membership rather than concentrating on pay at the end of a career. Commentators have also noted that, by redesigning public service schemes on a career average basis, governments aimed to share costs more evenly between members and employers while protecting many lower paid workers compared with unreformed final salary arrangements.

Career average schemes are also presented by some analysts as helping to control long term costs and financial risks for employers and taxpayers while still providing relatively generous pensions. Work by the Pensions Policy Institute projected that replacing unreformed final salary public service schemes with career average designs of a similar type would reduce average replacement rates for new entrants but leave members with pensions that remain valuable when compared with typical private sector provision. The Institute for Fiscal Studies has argued that the post 2015 public service pension schemes have a more sustainable structure and remain relatively generous overall for many members, even though the reforms reduced expected pension costs for the state.

Trade unions and some commentators have criticised the shift from final salary to career average schemes, particularly when combined with higher member contributions and increases in normal pension ages. The Trades Union Congress welcomed the retention of defined benefit pensions in the public sector but opposed moving away from final salary designs, arguing that the reforms amounted to cuts in pension promises and would require members to work longer or pay more for similar benefits. Union leaders and professional associations expressed concern that some groups, including staff whose pay rises quickly late in their careers, would receive lower pensions under a career average design than they would have earned in the previous final salary schemes.

Independent analysis has highlighted that the impact of replacing final salary schemes with career average designs depends strongly on detailed scheme rules such as accrual rates, revaluation indices, contribution structures and transitional protections. Studies of the United Kingdom public service reforms suggest that, while many lower and middle earners with relatively steady pay may receive similar or higher pensions under well designed career average schemes, others with particular career patterns may lose out and the overall distribution of costs between members and taxpayers remains a subject of policy debate.

== See also ==
- Occupational pension
- Defined benefit pension plan
- Defined contribution pension scheme
- Final salary pension
- Pensions in the United Kingdom
- Local Government Pension Scheme
- NHS Pension Scheme
- Teachers' Pension Scheme
