= NHS Pension Scheme =

Health service workers' pension scheme

NHS Pension Scheme (NHSPS) is the statutory, unfunded defined-benefit pension scheme for NHS staff in England and Wales, with accounting liabilities of about £457.2 billion as of 31 March 2025.

The scheme has three arrangements: two legacy final-salary sections established in 1995 and 2008, and a reformed career-average section introduced in 2015 under the Public Service Pensions Act 2013. All active members accrue in the 2015 scheme from 1 April 2022 following the public service pensions remedy.

Administration for England and Wales is provided by the NHS Business Services Authority on behalf of the Department of Health and Social Care. Separate NHS pension arrangements operate in Scotland and Northern Ireland.

== Overview ==
The NHS Pension Scheme is an occupational defined-benefit scheme for staff working in the National Health Service in England and Wales. It is open to eligible workers aged 16 to 75 who are directly employed by the NHS, to medical, dental and ophthalmic practitioners and trainees, to general medical practice staff, and to approved non-NHS providers of NHS services under scheme rules.

Administration for England and Wales is provided by the NHS Business Services Authority on behalf of the UK Government. Members fall into categories used by the scheme’s rules, including officers and practitioners, with separate provisions for locum practitioners and non-GP providers.

Access to the scheme can also be granted to staff of certain organisations that are not part of the NHS where a legal “direction” or similar instrument applies, for example after compulsory transfers or where an approved provider delivers NHS services.

Employers must automatically enrol eligible staff into a qualifying workplace pension, and the NHS Pension Scheme is normally used for NHS employment in England and Wales.

Separate NHS pension arrangements operate in Scotland and in Northern Ireland, each established under their own regulations and administrators. This article covers the NHS Pension Scheme for England and Wales only.

== History ==
=== 1948–1994: origins and development ===
The scheme dates from the creation of the National Health Service in 1948 and developed as a public service, unfunded, defined-benefit arrangement administered on a statutory basis. Over time coverage widened and the rules for officers and practitioners were consolidated into modernised regulations that preceded the 1995 arrangements.

=== 1995 section ===
A consolidated set of rules established the 1995 section as a final-salary arrangement. It included an officer section with an accrual rate of 1/80 of final salary plus an automatic lump sum for many members, and distinct calculation methods for practitioners. The section’s normal pension age was 60 for most members.

=== 2008 section ===
A reformed final-salary section for new entrants from 2008 provided accrual generally at 1/60 with a normal pension age of 65, and expanded flexible retirement options compared with the 1995 section. Existing members could move under a choice exercise.

=== 2010–2015: Hutton review, legislation and scheme design ===
Following the report of the Independent Public Service Pensions Commission in March 2011, the UK Government legislated through the Public Service Pensions Act 2013 for reformed public service schemes and introduced the NHS Pension Scheme 2015 by regulations. The 2015 scheme is a career-average arrangement with an accrual rate of 1/54 each year and in-service revaluation by CPI plus 1.5 percentage points.

=== 2015–2019: implementation and early operation ===
The 2015 scheme took effect on 1 April 2015 alongside transitional protections for those closest to retirement, which kept some members in legacy sections. Practitioners and non-GP providers continued to have section-specific calculation rules under the regulations.

=== 2019–2022: remedy and temporary easements ===
In 2018 the Court of Appeal held that transitional protections introduced in 2015 were unlawfully age-discriminatory. The Government legislated for a remedy in the Public Service Pensions and Judicial Offices Act 2022. During the coronavirus pandemic temporary easements suspended elements of abatement and the 16-hour rule for returners; these time-limited easements ended in March 2022. From 1 April 2022 all active accrual has been in the 2015 scheme, with legacy sections closed to further accrual.

=== 2022–present: remedy implementation and regulatory changes ===
Scheme-specific regulations made in 2023 implement the deferred choice remedy for service between 2015 and 2022, delivered through Remediable Service Statements and choice exercises. The Department of Health and Social Care also consulted on, and implemented, changes including the move of the annual revaluation date to 6 April from 2023 and the introduction of partial retirement for members with 1995 section benefits from 1 October 2023.

== Legal framework ==
=== Primary legislation ===
The legal basis for public service pension schemes is set by the Public Service Pensions Act 2013, which provides powers for responsible authorities to establish and manage reformed schemes and to make scheme regulations. The Public Service Pensions and Judicial Offices Act 2022 provides the statutory framework for the remedy of unlawful age discrimination identified by the courts in relation to the 2015 reforms.

=== Scheme regulations ===
The NHS Pension Scheme in England and Wales operates under statutory regulations. Legacy benefits are governed by the National Health Service Pension Scheme Regulations 1995 and 2008, which continue to apply to service built up under those sections. The reformed scheme is established by the National Health Service Pension Scheme Regulations 2015.

=== Remedy regulations ===
Scheme-specific regulations made in 2023 implement the deferred choice remedy for the period from 1 April 2015 to 31 March 2022. They set out processes for remediable service and for issuing remediable service statements to affected members.

=== Treasury Directions and actuarial valuations ===
Periodic valuations are carried out by the Government Actuary's Department under HM Treasury’s Public Service Pensions (Valuations and Employer Cost Cap) Directions 2023. The Directions set the methodology for valuations and the operation of the cost control mechanism. HM Treasury confirmed these Directions for use in the 2020 valuation cycle, which set employer contribution rates from April 2024.

=== Governance code and Pension Board ===
The Pensions Regulator’s General Code of Practice applies to public service pension schemes and sets expectations for governance and administration. A statutory NHS Pension Board assists the scheme manager in securing compliance with the regulations and with applicable law. Its terms of reference and composition are published on GOV.UK.

=== Ongoing amendments and guidance ===
The Department of Health and Social Care periodically consults on and makes amending regulations, including changes made for partial retirement and contribution structures. NHS Pensions maintains a live list of recent statutory instruments that affect the scheme.

== Membership and employers ==
=== Eligibility and scope ===
Eligibility is set in scheme regulations and guidance. The scheme is open to workers aged 16 to 75 who are directly employed by the National Health Service in England and Wales, to medical, dental and ophthalmic practitioners and trainees, and to general medical practice staff. Access can also be granted to staff of approved organisations that deliver NHS services where a legal direction, determination or similar instrument applies.

=== Member categories ===
Scheme rules describe members as officers and practitioners, with separate provisions for locum practitioners and for non-GP providers. From 1 April 2022 all active members accrue in the 2015 Scheme. Members with legacy service in the 1995 or 2008 sections normally keep a final salary link for that service if they do not have a break in active membership longer than five years.

Dental practice staff who are not qualified dentists are not eligible to join the scheme and are instead subject to automatic enrolment into another qualifying workplace pension.

Freelance GP locum work is pensionable in the scheme subject to scheme rules and deadlines. Regulations require this work to be pensioned within specific time limits.

=== Employers and participation ===
Participating employers include NHS trusts, foundation trusts and Local Health Boards, general medical practices, arm’s length bodies, integrated care boards, local authorities and approved bodies admitted by direction or under New Fair Deal. Independent provider employers participate where they hold qualifying NHS contracts.

As at 31 March 2025 there were 7,770 participating employers across these categories. On the same date there were 1,872,287 active members, 845,020 deferred members and 1,199,771 pensions in payment.

Employers must automatically enrol eligible staff into a qualifying workplace pension. For NHS employment in England and Wales the NHS Pension Scheme is normally used, with employees able to opt out if they wish.

== Benefits ==
=== Sections at a glance ===
The NHS Pension Scheme has three arrangements with different benefit designs. The 1995 and 2008 sections are final-salary arrangements. The 2015 Scheme is a career-average scheme. Members can hold service in more than one arrangement.

=== 1995 section ===
The 1995 section provides a final-salary pension. For most officer members the standard accrual is 1/80 of final pensionable pay for each year of service with an automatic retirement lump sum normally equal to three times the pension. Practitioners’ benefits are calculated from career earnings under section rules. The normal pension age is 60 for most members, with lower ages for specified legacy groups.

=== 2008 section ===
The 2008 section is a final-salary arrangement with an accrual rate generally of 1/60 and a normal pension age of 65. There is no automatic lump sum although members can exchange pension for cash within HMRC limits.

=== 2015 Scheme (CARE) ===
The 2015 Scheme is a career-average arrangement that accrues at 1/54 of pensionable earnings each year. While a member remains active, each year’s pension is revalued by the Treasury Order for CPI plus 1.5 percentage points. The normal pension age is the member’s State Pension age, or 65 if later. There is no automatic lump sum although members can exchange pension for cash within HMRC limits. From 2023 the annual revaluation date moved to 6 April.

=== Retirement routes and flexibilities ===
Members can take benefits at normal pension age or retire earlier with an actuarial reduction. Late retirement factors can apply where rules permit. Partial retirement is available in all arrangements. Members who take partial retirement must agree a reduction in pensionable pay of at least 10% for the first year. From October 2023 partial retirement became available for members with 1995 section benefits. NHS England guidance confirms that members can take between 20% and 100% of their pension while continuing to work and to build further pension in the 2015 Scheme, subject to the pay-reduction condition.

=== Commutation (exchanging pension for a lump sum) ===
Subject to tax limits, members can exchange annual pension for a larger retirement lump sum. The exchange is at a rate of £12 of lump sum for each £1 of annual pension given up. The maximum tax-free lump sum is normally the lower of 25% of the capital value of benefits or 25% of the standard allowance under tax rules.

=== Ill-health retirement ===
The scheme provides two tiers of ill-health retirement. Tier 1 pays the pension earned without reduction where the member is permanently incapable of efficiently carrying out the duties of their employment. Tier 2 adds an enhancement to reflect prospective service to normal pension age. In the 2015 Scheme the Tier 2 enhancement is one-half of the prospective pension. In the 1995 and 2008 sections the Tier 2 enhancement is two-thirds of prospective membership to normal pension age.

=== Survivor and death benefits ===
A lump sum on death in service is normally payable. In the 2015 Scheme this is the higher of two times relevant earnings in the last 12 months or two times the highest revalued pensionable earnings in any of the previous ten scheme years. Adult dependant’s pensions are payable to a surviving spouse, civil partner or qualifying partner. Long-term adult pensions are set by section rules. Under the 2015 Scheme the adult dependant’s long-term pension is 33.75% of the notional pension. In the 1995 and 2008 sections the adult dependant’s long-term pension is generally 50% of the notional pension for the relevant group. Children’s pensions are also payable at rates set in section rules.

== Contributions and funding ==
=== Funding model ===
The scheme is an unfunded defined benefit arrangement. Benefits are paid from current employer and member contributions with any shortfall or surplus managed through public expenditure. Administration costs are met by an employer levy of 0.08% of pensionable pay.

=== Member contributions ===
Member contributions are tiered by a member’s actual annual pensionable pay. From 1 April 2024 to 31 March 2025 the bands were 5.2%, 6.5%, 8.3%, 9.8%, 10.7% and 12.5%. Bands and some rates are reviewed periodically and may change in future years.

=== Employer contributions and administration levy ===
The employer contribution rate is 23.7% of pensionable pay from 1 April 2024. The 0.08% administration levy is collected alongside employer contributions, giving a gross 23.78%. For cash-flow reasons a transitional approach continues under which employers pay 14.38% through the routine collection process and the balance is met centrally. NHS Employers guidance states the increase from April 2024 is funded centrally for most employers.

=== How rates are set ===
Employer rates are determined by periodic actuarial valuations carried out by the Government Actuary's Department under HM Treasury Directions. The 2020 valuation set the rate that applies from April 2024. Details of the valuation, assumptions and cost control mechanism are published on GOV.UK.

== Governance and administration ==
=== Scheme manager and administrator ===
The Department of Health and Social Care is the scheme manager for England and Wales. Administration is delivered by the NHS Business Services Authority under the NHS Pensions brand, which publishes scheme guidance and annual accounts.

=== Pension Board ===
A statutory NHS Pension Board assists the scheme manager in securing compliance with the regulations and with applicable law. The Board’s role, membership and terms of reference are published on GOV.UK.

=== Actuarial advice and valuations ===
The Government Actuary's Department advises the scheme and carries out periodic valuations under HM Treasury Directions. Valuation documents for the 2020 cycle and related cost control information are published on GOV.UK.

=== Member communications and data ===
NHS Pensions issues annual benefit statements for active and deferred members and provides Total Reward Statements for eligible NHS staff. These statements are used for member information and data reconciliation.

=== Employer responsibilities ===
Participating employers are responsible for enrolling eligible staff, maintaining accurate records, and paying contributions in line with scheme rules and guidance. NHS Pensions provides employer technical guidance and contribution information.

=== Dispute resolution and oversight ===
Complaints are handled through a two-stage Internal Dispute Resolution Procedure. If a member remains dissatisfied they may apply to The Pensions Ombudsman. The Pensions Regulator’s General Code sets expectations for governance and administration across public service pension schemes.

== Valuation and cost control ==
=== Framework and purpose ===
Periodic actuarial valuations are carried out by the Government Actuary's Department under HM Treasury’s Public Service Pensions (Valuations and Employer Cost Cap) Directions. Valuations for unfunded public service schemes assess the cost of benefits and set the employer contribution rate for a period that follows the valuation date.

=== 2020 valuation outcomes ===
The valuation as at 31 March 2020 set an employer contribution rate of 23.7% of pensionable pay from 1 April 2024. The valuation documentation also explains the interaction with the reformed cost control mechanism.

=== Cost control mechanism (reformed design) ===
Following a review, the Government implemented a reformed scheme-only design for the cost control mechanism, widened the corridor to plus or minus three percentage points of pensionable pay, and introduced an economic check that must be met before a breach is confirmed. For the 2020 cycle the mechanism did not lead to benefit or member-rate changes once the economic check was applied.

=== Discount rate and contribution impacts ===
Employer rates are sensitive to the discount rate used for valuations. In March 2023 a written ministerial statement confirmed the SCAPE discount rate of CPI plus 1.7 percentage points a year for this cycle. That increase in the assessed cost of benefits contributed to the higher employer rate from April 2024.

=== Data and methodology ===
Valuation results are supported by separate data and assumptions reports. These explain the dataset used, the demographic and financial assumptions, and the calculation approach required by the Directions.

=== Next cycle ===
The next valuation is as at 31 March 2024 and is expected to set employer contribution rates for a later period beginning in 2027. Departmental and GAD material indicate that publications for that cycle will follow after completion of analysis and review.

== Legal and policy developments ==
=== McCloud remedy and implementation ===
Following the Court of Appeal’s judgments on transitional protections, Parliament legislated for the public service pensions remedy in the Public Service Pensions and Judicial Offices Act 2022. Scheme-specific regulations made in 2023 implement the deferred choice remedy for service between 1 April 2015 and 31 March 2022. NHS Pensions is issuing Remediable Service Statements and operating the choice process for affected members.

=== Partial retirement and retire-and-rejoin ===
Following consultation, the Department of Health and Social Care introduced policy changes to support retention. From 1 October 2023 partial retirement is available to members with 1995 section benefits under amending regulations, subject to conditions. From 1 April 2023 members with 1995 section benefits who retire and return may re-join the 2015 Scheme after a 24-hour break and build further benefits. NHS England guidance explains how retire-and-return operates in practice.

=== Revaluation date and contribution structure changes ===
The 2023 consultation also confirmed moving the annual revaluation date to 6 April from 2023 to align with pensions tax rules. The department’s consultation documents and responses set out phased changes to the member contribution structure and related policy updates. Detailed rates are covered in the “Contributions and funding” section.

=== Removal of temporary COVID-19 easements ===
Temporary easements that had suspended parts of scheme rules during the coronavirus pandemic ended in March 2022. Normal arrangements then applied until subsequent permanent changes were made by regulation or policy.

=== Cost control mechanism and discount rate context ===
From the 2020 valuations the cost control mechanism operates on a reformed-scheme-only basis with a corridor of plus or minus three percentage points and an economic check. A written ministerial statement in March 2023 confirmed the SCAPE discount rate of CPI plus 1.7 percentage points a year for this cycle. These cross-scheme policies affect valuation outcomes and employer contribution rates. Further detail appears in “Valuation and cost control”.

== Statistics ==
=== Membership ===
As at 31 March 2025 there were 1,872,287 active members, 845,020 deferred members and 1,199,771 pensions in payment.

Selected membership totals, England and Wales (as at 31 March 2025)
Category	Count
Active members	1,872,287
Deferred members	845,020
Pensions in payment	1,199,771

=== Employers ===
At 31 March 2025 there were 7,770 participating employers across categories including NHS trusts and Local Health Boards, GP practices, arm’s length bodies, direction bodies, integrated care boards, local authorities and approved independent provider contracts.

=== Income, expenditure and cash items ===
Selected income and expenditure, year ended 31 March 2025 (England and Wales; £ billion)
Item	Amount
Contributions receivable	24.4
Service cost	16.3
Pension financing cost	21.9
Combined net expenditure	13.8

Scheme administration cost in 2024–25 was £64.9 million. Surplus cash of £6,308.5 million was payable to the Consolidated Fund.

=== Accounting liability ===
The accounting liability was £457.2 billion as at 31 March 2025, compared with £431.0 billion a year earlier.

== Devolved administrations ==
Separate NHS pension schemes operate in Scotland and Northern Ireland under their own regulations and administrators. This article covers the NHS Pension Scheme for England and Wales only.

=== Scotland ===
The NHS Pension Scheme (Scotland) is established by the National Health Service Pension Scheme (Scotland) Regulations 2015 and is administered by the Scottish Public Pensions Agency. The 2015 Scheme in Scotland is a career-average arrangement that accrues at 1/54 of pensionable pay with in-service revaluation by CPI plus 1.5 percentage points. From 31 March 2022 all active members accrue in the 2015 Scheme.

=== Northern Ireland ===
The Health and Social Care Pension Scheme in Northern Ireland is established by the Health and Social Care Pension Scheme Regulations (Northern Ireland) 2015 and is administered by the HSC Pension Service. The 2015 Scheme is a career-average arrangement that accrues at 1/54 of pensionable pay with in-service revaluation by CPI plus 1.5 percentage points.

== See also ==
- Government Actuary's Department
- Local Government Pension Scheme
- National Health Service
- Pensions in the United Kingdom
- State Pension (United Kingdom)
- Teachers' Pension Scheme
- The Pensions Regulator
