= Local Government Pension Scheme =

British public service pension scheme

- Official scheme logo
- Abbreviation: LGPS
- Formation: 1922
- Type: Public service pension scheme
- Purpose: Statutory, funded defined benefit occupational pension scheme for eligible employees of local authorities and participating employers.
- Region served: United Kingdom
- Members: England and Wales: 6.9 million (31 March 2025); Scotland: 670,051 (31 March 2024); Northern Ireland: 176,915 (31 March 2025)
- Website: www.lgpsmember.org

Local Government Pension Scheme (LGPS) is the statutory, funded defined benefit pension scheme for employees of local government and participating employers in the United Kingdom. In England and Wales it is administered locally by 86 administering authorities, in Scotland by 11 regional funds, and in Northern Ireland as a single fund administered by the Northern Ireland Local Government Officers’ Superannuation Committee (NILGOSC).

As of March 2025, the scheme in England and Wales covered about 6.9 million members and held investments of about £402 billion.

The scheme design moved from final-salary benefits to career average revalued earnings in England and Wales from 1 April 2014, in Scotland from 1 April 2015, and in Northern Ireland from 1 April 2015. Funds are subject to triennial actuarial valuations to assess funding and set contribution strategies.

Since 2015 administering authorities in England and Wales have been directed by government to pool investments through authorised asset pools in order to achieve economies of scale and strengthen governance.

== How the scheme works ==
The Local Government Pension Scheme is a funded public service pension scheme set up by regulations and administered locally by pension funds across the United Kingdom. It is distinct from other large UK public service schemes such as the NHS Pension Scheme and the Teachers' Pension Scheme, which are mostly unfunded and operate on a pay-as-you-go basis.

=== Where the rules apply ===
In England and Wales the scheme framework is set by the Local Government Pension Scheme Regulations 2013 and related instruments, with detailed guidance issued by central government and the Scheme Advisory Board. In Scotland the scheme operates under the Local Government Pension Scheme (Scotland) Regulations 2018 with regulatory guidance provided by the Scottish Public Pensions Agency. In Northern Ireland the Local Government Pension Scheme is established by the 2014 regulations and administered by the Northern Ireland Local Government Officers’ Superannuation Committee (NILGOSC). The government’s policy on investment pooling applies to England and Wales only, with Scottish and Northern Irish funds running their own investment arrangements under their respective regulations.

=== Who runs it ===
Each administering authority acts as the scheme manager for its fund and is responsible for local administration and decision-making within the regulatory framework. Every fund must have a local pension board to assist the scheme manager in securing effective and efficient governance and administration. In England and Wales, the LGPS Scheme Advisory Board supports the Department for Levelling Up, Housing and Communities and administering authorities on scheme policy, data and guidance. Across the UK, funds are expected to meet the governance and internal-control standards set out by The Pensions Regulator for public service schemes.

=== Who is covered ===
Members include employees of local authorities and other participating employers admitted under the regulations, with categories reported in official statistics for England and Wales and equivalent publications in Scotland and Northern Ireland. “Members” in published totals usually means active contributors, deferred members and pensioners in payment, with a small number of flexible retirees where used by the reporting body. For an overview of the scheme’s governance and roles written for members, see the official LGPS member site.

== History ==
=== Origins and early legislation ===
Local government superannuation developed piecemeal during the late nineteenth and early twentieth centuries, moving onto a statutory footing with the Local Government and Other Officers' Superannuation Act 1922. The Local Government Superannuation Act 1937 expanded and regularised the arrangements in England and Wales, with further changes made by the Local Government Superannuation Act 1953. In Northern Ireland the Northern Ireland Local Government Officers’ Superannuation Committee (NILGOSC) was established in April 1950 to administer the scheme there.

=== Consolidation and reform, 1972 to 2013 ===
A modern scheme framework was established under section 7 of the Superannuation Act 1972, implemented through the Local Government Superannuation Regulations 1974. The scheme was re-titled and consolidated in the 1995 Regulations and then updated by the 1997 and 2008 packages, the latter introducing a “new look” final-salary design in England and Wales with a 1/60th accrual rate in place of 1/80th for service after 1 April 2008.

=== Reforms since 2014 ===
Following the Public Service Pensions Act 2013, new regulations introduced a career average revalued earnings design from 1 April 2014 in England and Wales, with parallel changes from 1 April 2015 in Scotland and Northern Ireland. In November 2015 the government issued guidance requiring administering authorities in England and Wales to pool investments to achieve scale and stronger governance, followed by replacement investment regulations in 2016 and statutory guidance on investment strategy statements.

The Court of Appeal’s 2018 judgment in McCloud and Sargeant found unlawful age discrimination in public service pension reforms. The LGPS implemented its remedy with effect from 1 October 2023 through the Local Government Pension Scheme (Amendment) (No. 3) Regulations 2023, with further explanatory material from Parliament and government sources describing the scheme-specific approach.

== Governance and regulation ==
The LGPS is a public service pension scheme established by regulations made under primary legislation, with day-to-day administration carried out by administering authorities that act as the scheme manager for their fund. Each fund has a local pension board to assist the scheme manager in securing effective and efficient governance and administration, and must operate within the expectations set by The Pensions Regulator’s general code of practice for governance and internal controls.

=== England and Wales ===
In England and Wales the scheme framework is set by the Local Government Pension Scheme Regulations 2013 and related instruments, supplemented by statutory guidance from central government and the Scheme Advisory Board (SAB). Administering authorities must maintain an investment strategy statement and report on governance matters in their annual reports, with policy developments led by the Department for Levelling Up, Housing and Communities and advised by the SAB. Since 2015 they have been required to invest through authorised asset pools, with pooling policy and reporting refined through subsequent consultations and guidance.

=== Scotland ===
In Scotland the scheme is governed by the Local Government Pension Scheme (Scotland) Regulations 2018 and related Scottish statutory instruments, with the Scottish Public Pensions Agency providing regulatory guidance and oversight on behalf of the Scottish Government. Funds have local pension boards with employer and member representation, operating alongside existing committee structures, within the same overall regulatory expectations from The Pensions Regulator.

=== Northern Ireland ===
In Northern Ireland the scheme is administered by the Northern Ireland Local Government Officers’ Superannuation Committee (NILGOSC), which is the scheme manager and, following designation by the Minister for Communities, also the Pension Board for the scheme. NILGOSC operates within the Northern Ireland LGPS regulations and is sponsored by the Department for Communities, with governance and administration overseen against The Pensions Regulator’s code for public service schemes.

== Membership and employers ==
Membership of the LGPS is open to employees of local authorities and other bodies that participate under the scheme regulations. Members are counted as employees who still contribute, former employees with deferred rights, pensioners in payment and a small number of flexible retirees, as defined in official statistics for England and Wales.

=== Eligibility and employer types ===
Employers participate as scheme employers listed in Schedule 2 to the 2013 Regulations or by admission agreement, with practice varying by fund. Official statistics group participating employers into four categories: local authorities and connected bodies, centrally funded public sector bodies, other public sector bodies and private or voluntary sector bodies. Academy trusts are scheme employers for non-teaching staff and must offer LGPS membership to eligible employees under the English regulations.

=== Scale and composition ===
As of March 2024, there were about 6.7 million members in the scheme across England and Wales: 2.2 million employees who still contribute, 2.5 million deferred members, 2.1 million pensioners and around 23,000 flexible retirees.

=== Scotland and Northern Ireland ===
In Scotland there were 670,051 members across the eleven funds at 31 March 2024, as reported in the Scottish Local Government Finance Statistics.

In Northern Ireland the scheme is administered by NILGOSC and, as of March 2025, had 176,915 members consisting of 86,137 contributing members, 37,063 deferred members and 48,171 pensioners, with 170 employing authorities contributing to the scheme.

== Benefits and contributions ==
=== Scheme design and build-up ===
The LGPS operates on a career average revalued earnings basis. In England and Wales members build up pension at 1/49th of pensionable earnings each scheme year, with the balance in the pension account revalued each April in line with the cost of living. Members who elect for the 50/50 section pay half their normal contributions and build up pension at 1/98th while retaining full death in service and ill-health cover.

=== Contributions ===
Member contribution rates are set by tiered pay bands in regulations and reviewed annually. In England and Wales the bands for 2025 indicate a range from 5.5% to 12.5% of pensionable pay, with employers meeting the balance of cost set by actuarial valuation at fund level. Scotland sets its own tiered bands, currently ranging from 5.5% to 12%, and also offers the 50/50 section. In Northern Ireland the member rate generally ranges from 5.5% to 10.5%, with employer rates set by valuation and published by NILGOSC.

Members can pay extra to increase benefits using Additional Pension Contributions or additional voluntary contributions, subject to scheme limits and tax rules.

=== Taking benefits and pension age ===
Benefits can usually be taken between ages 55 and 75, subject to actuarial adjustment if taken before State Pension age where the normal pension age is linked to that age. Benefits earned before the CARE reforms keep their protected normal pension age in line with the earlier scheme rules.

=== Ill-health and survivors’ benefits ===
If a member leaves on health grounds and meets the criteria, tiered ill-health pensions can be awarded with enhancements based on assumed pensionable pay. Survivors’ benefits may be payable to a spouse, civil partner or eligible cohabiting partner, and eligible children, with pensions normally payable for life.

== Funding and valuations ==
=== Valuation cycle and responsibilities ===
The LGPS is a funded scheme. Each administering authority maintains a pension fund and must obtain an actuarial valuation at intervals set in the regulations to assess solvency and set contribution rates for employers, taking account of a funding strategy statement. The actuary issues a rates and adjustments certificate that specifies the primary rate for future service and any secondary adjustments for individual employers, normally for the three years following the valuation date. In England and Wales the 2022 valuations set employer contribution rates for 1 April 2023 to 31 March 2026.

=== England and Wales (2022 valuation) ===
At 31 March 2022 the Government Actuary’s review under section 13 of the Public Service Pensions Act 2013 reported total assets of about £366 billion and total liabilities of about £344 billion on local fund bases, an aggregate funding level of 106%, with 26 of 87 funds in deficit on those prudent local assumptions. On the Government Actuary’s best-estimate basis the aggregate funding level was 119%. The Department’s summary noted that most funds were in surplus at 31 March 2022 but highlighted ongoing funding risks and the need for appropriate contribution strategies.

=== Scotland ===
In Scotland the scheme is governed by separate regulations and funds are valued every three years, with the 2023 valuation cycle completed and reported to stakeholders. The section 13 report for Scotland explains that the Government Actuary reviews the valuations against aims of compliance, consistency, solvency and long-term cost efficiency, and it records growth in aggregate assets between 2020 and 2023.

=== Northern Ireland ===
In Northern Ireland the scheme is administered by NILGOSC. Employer contribution rates are set by the fund’s actuary following each valuation and published for the relevant three-year period.

== Investment and pooling ==
=== Statutory framework ===
Investment of LGPS pension funds in England and Wales is governed by the Local Government Pension Scheme (Management and Investment of Funds) Regulations 2016, which require each administering authority to maintain and publish an Investment Strategy Statement and to have regard to statutory guidance when doing so. The government first set out criteria for pooling assets in November 2015, inviting proposals for collective investment vehicles to achieve economies of scale and improved access to certain asset classes.

=== Policy evolution and current requirements ===
Following consultation on “next steps” in 2023, the government issued its Fit for the future response in May 2025. It confirms minimum standards to be mandated in legislation, including that administering authorities delegate implementation of their investment strategy to their pool, take their principal investment advice from the pool, ensure the pool is an FCA-authorised investment management company with capacity to implement strategy, transfer all investments to the management of the pool, and develop capability for due diligence and management of local investments. The response also sets expectations for plans and reporting on local investment, and for strengthened governance and training, with independent reviews and clearer transparency at pool level. It indicates a March 2026 point by which all assets should be under pool management, while allowing for implementation choices between pooled vehicles and other arrangements decided by the pool in the collective interests of partner funds.

=== Pools and operating models ===
Eight asset pools operate in England and Wales. Operating models vary. Some pools are FCA-authorised managers and act as operator/AIFM of an Authorised contractual scheme, while others appoint an external FCA-authorised operator. Examples include London CIV and LGPS Central as authorised managers, and Wales Pension Partnership and ACCESS appointing Waystone as the operator for their ACS vehicle.

=== Implementation scale and savings ===
Government and Scheme Advisory Board data record that as of March 2024, about 45% of LGPS assets in England and Wales were invested through pool vehicles, with a further 27% managed by pools outside those vehicles. Taken together, around 72% of assets were under pool management at that date. The policy case for pooling emphasises net savings and better access to private markets. Reporting is being standardised so that funds disclose the proportion pooled or under pool management, asset allocation, and net savings in annual reports and in their investment strategy statements.

=== Investment policy: private markets and local or UK investment ===
Reforms since 2023 aim to widen access to private markets and improve transparency of costs and outcomes, while leaving asset selection to the pool and partner funds within fiduciary duties. The 2025 response expects administering authorities to set out their approach to local investment in the strategy statement, including a target range, to work with strategic authorities to identify opportunities, and to report annually on local investment and its impact. Pools are expected to have the capability to carry out due diligence and make final investment decisions on such projects. Coverage in the national press has highlighted sector support and objections, particularly around timelines and the prospect of further consolidation.

=== Governance, skills and transparency ===
Alongside pooling, the 2025 response sets measures on governance and capability that include knowledge and skills for committee members, a senior LGPS officer role, a published governance and training strategy and an administration strategy, regular independent reviews, and greater transparency of pool boards. Funds and pools are also expected to meet the expectations in The Pensions Regulator’s General Code regarding effective systems of governance and internal controls.

=== Climate and stewardship reporting ===
In 2022 the government consulted on proposals to require administering authorities in England and Wales to assess, manage and report climate-related risks in line with the TCFD framework, and many funds and pools have published TCFD-style reports while awaiting final pensions-specific regulations or guidance. Government also issued TCFD-aligned disclosure guidance for the UK public sector in July 2025, which some bodies may apply or follow in part alongside pensions-specific requirements.

=== Pools and indicative size ===
The landscape and sizes change as funds transition between pools. The figures below are recent public statements by the pools or official summaries. Each is dated and sourced.

LGPS asset pools (England and Wales): recent published size (definitions vary by pool; see notes in cells)
Pool	Size and basis
ACCESS	£50 billion (pooled assets). As of November 2024
Border to Coast	over £55 billion (assets overseen or managed). As of March 2025
Brunel Pension Partnership	c.£35 billion (AUM). As of June 2024
LGPS Central	≈£45 billion (AUM; report notes £32.4bn at 31 Dec 2024 and ≈£45bn at 31 May 2025). As of May 2025
London CIV	£34.2 billion (pooled and deemed pooled). As of March 2025
Local Pensions Partnership Investments (LPPI)	£26.9 billion (AUM). As of June 2025
Northern LGPS	£61.4 billion (assets under stewardship). As of March 2024
Wales Pension Partnership	£25.8 billion total; £19.4 billion pooled (75%). As of March 2025

== Devolved nations ==
This article covers the Local Government Pension Scheme across the United Kingdom, but governance and legislation differ by nation. Pooling policy and the 2016 investment regulations apply to England and Wales, while Scotland and Northern Ireland operate under separate regulations and do not participate in the England and Wales pooling structures.

=== Scotland ===
The Scottish scheme is set out in the Local Government Pension Scheme (Scotland) Regulations 2018, with regulatory guidance provided by the Scottish Public Pensions Agency. Administration is carried out by eleven regional funds with local pension boards, operating within The Pensions Regulator’s expectations for governance and internal controls. The Scottish regulations do not contain the pooling requirements that apply in England and Wales, and Scottish funds manage investments under the Scottish framework. The LGPS Advisory Board for Scotland provides scheme-level advice and guidance to ministers and administering authorities.

=== Wales ===
Welsh administering authorities are part of the England and Wales scheme and legislation. They pool investments through the Wales Pension Partnership (WPP), which provides pooled and other structures for the eight Welsh funds in line with the government’s pooling policy for England and Wales. WPP publishes sub-fund ranges and annual reporting, including TCFD-style disclosures by the pool and its partner funds.

=== Northern Ireland ===
The Local Government Pension Scheme (Northern Ireland) is established by the 2014 regulations and is administered centrally by the NILGOSC as the scheme manager. The scheme is sponsored by the Department for Communities. It is not part of the England and Wales pooling arrangements and invests under its own framework and guidance.

== Legal and policy developments ==
=== McCloud and Sargeant age-discrimination cases ===
In 2018 the Court of Appeal held that transitional protection in public service pension reforms was unlawfully discriminatory on grounds of age in the McCloud and Sargeant cases. The LGPS implemented its scheme-specific remedy from 1 October 2023 through amending regulations, with accompanying government and Scheme Advisory Board guidance for administering authorities and members. Follow-up regulations in 2024 addressed annual benefit statement disclosures during the remedy period.

=== Survivor benefits and equal treatment ===
Litigation and subsequent policy work on survivor benefits led to further changes and proposals for the LGPS. The government’s 2025 consultation on access and fairness proposed adjustments to survivor pensions and death grants to address historic differences in treatment and to ensure equal access regardless of sex or marital status, building on the implications of the Goodwin ruling for public service schemes.

=== Investment guidance and boycotts litigation ===
Statutory investment guidance issued in 2016 restricted administering authorities from using pension policy to pursue boycotts, divestment or sanctions that were contrary to UK foreign or defence policy. The policy was challenged by judicial review. In April 2020 the Supreme Court held that the relevant passages of the guidance were unlawful because the power relied upon did not extend to making rules about the content of local authorities’ investment decisions in this way. Subsequent government policy proposals on ethical investment have continued to be debated, but the Supreme Court ruling remains a key authority on the limits of central guidance over LGPS investment policy.

=== Public sector exit payment cap ===
Regulations introduced in November 2020 to cap exit payments in the public sector were revoked in February 2021 after a government review concluded that the cap had produced unintended consequences. The Scheme Advisory Board records that the cap ceased to apply from 12 February 2021, with directions disapplying the cap and guidance on unwinding affected cases.

=== Guaranteed Minimum Pension indexation ===
Public service pensioners with a Guaranteed Minimum Pension are affected by the long-running question of how indexation should apply following the end of additional State Pension. Government policy moved to provide full indexation within public service schemes, confirmed in 2021 guidance and response material, and aligned with the relevant Treasury directions and orders.

== See also ==
- Pensions in the United Kingdom
- Local government in the United Kingdom
- Teachers' Pension Scheme
- NHS Pension Scheme
- UK labour law
