= Teachers' Pension Scheme =

Pension scheme in England and Wales

Teachers' Pension Scheme (TPS) is the statutory, unfunded defined-benefit public service pension scheme for eligible teachers and lecturers in England and Wales. It operates on a pay-as-you-go basis, with benefits paid from public funds. As at 31 March 2025, the scheme reported a pension liability of about £290.7 billion.

The TPS has three sections: two legacy final-salary sections with normal pension ages of 60 and 65, and a career-average section introduced in 2015 under the Public Service Pensions Act 2013, in which the normal pension age is linked to State Pension age.

Employee contributions are tiered by pensionable earnings; as of April 2024, the employer contribution rate is 28.6% of pensionable pay, and scheme administration costs are recovered via an additional 0.08% of pensionable pay. Separate teachers’ pension schemes operate in Scotland and Northern Ireland.

== Overview ==
The scheme covers eligible teaching and lecturing staff employed in England and Wales across state-funded schools, maintained nurseries, academies and academy trusts, and further-education colleges. Participation is also available to some higher-education institutions and to independent schools that have elected to join the scheme.

The Department for Education is the scheme manager for England and Wales. Day-to-day administration is delivered under the Teachers’ Pensions brand, with services transitioning from Capita to Tata Consultancy Services under a long-term contract running to September 2035.

Separate public service teachers’ pension arrangements operate in Scotland and Northern Ireland, each established under their own regulations and administrators. This article covers the Teachers’ Pension Scheme for England and Wales only.

== History ==
=== Origins and early superannuation ===
Teachers in England and Wales moved from local and ad hoc arrangements to statutory superannuation in the early twentieth century, which established a national framework for teachers’ pensions under central government oversight. Early provisions created the basis for later consolidated schemes and permanent administration by the education department.

=== Inter-war consolidation to post-war settlement ===
During the inter-war years and after 1945 the teachers’ superannuation framework was consolidated, administration was standardised, and index-linking policy for public service pensions developed over time. These changes embedded teachers’ pensions as a long-term public service obligation rather than a discretionary benefit.

=== Late twentieth-century changes ===
From the 1980s to the mid-2000s the scheme was modernised alongside wider public service pension reforms. Access for part-time staff expanded, treatment of multiple employments improved, and scheme rules were reorganised into updated regulations that set the stage for later reform.

=== 2007 reform of the legacy final salary scheme ===
In 2007 a reformed final-salary section with a normal pension age of 65 was introduced for new entrants, while the earlier section with a normal pension age of 60 remained for existing members. The package adjusted contributions and benefits to reflect longevity and affordability, creating two legacy sections that continued alongside later changes.

=== 2010–2014: Hutton review, legislation and scheme design decisions ===
Following the review by the Independent Public Service Pensions Commission, the UK Government legislated through the Public Service Pensions Act 2013 and made new scheme regulations for teachers in 2014. The policy decisions taken in this period set the parameters for a career-average design and introduced transitional protections for those closest to retirement.

=== 2015 launch of the reformed career-average section ===
A career-average section began in April 2015. Pension accrues at 1/57 of pensionable earnings each year and is revalued in service by CPI plus 1.6 percent, with the section's normal pension age linked to State Pension age. Members with legacy service retained their final-salary benefits for pre-2015 service, subject to the scheme's rules on breaks and links.

=== 2016–2019: contracting out ends, valuations, employer rate step-up and sector impacts ===
Contracting out for defined-benefit public service schemes ended in April 2016 under the Pensions Act 2014. Subsequent valuation outcomes contributed to a higher employer contribution rate and prompted support measures for state-funded providers, while participation by some independent schools became a subject of policy debate.

=== 2018–2022: McCloud and the cost control pause ===
In 2018 the Court of Appeal held that transitional protection in the 2015 public service reforms was unlawfully age-discriminatory. The Government paused elements of the cost control mechanism and legislated for a remedy in the Public Service Pensions and Judicial Offices Act 2022, while confirming that legacy sections would close to further accrual on 1 April 2022. Valuation and cost control processes were updated through later HM Treasury directions.

=== 2022–present: remedy implementation and current status ===
From April 2022 all active accrual has been in the career-average section. A retrospective deferred choice remedy applies to service between 2015 and 2022, delivered through Remediable Service Statements and choice exercises for members, including immediate-choice cohorts. Recent departmental reports set out implementation steps, current contribution rates and the scale of the scheme's liabilities.

== Legal framework ==
=== Primary legislation ===
The scheme sits within the framework created by the Public Service Pensions Act 2013, which provides for new public service pension schemes in Great Britain and sets out governance roles for the scheme manager and pension board. The Act also provides for the link between the normal pension age in reformed schemes and State Pension age.

=== Scheme regulations ===
Detailed rules are made by statutory instrument. The legacy final salary provisions are set out in the Teachers’ Pensions Regulations 2010 (SI 2010/990). The career-average section is set out in the Teachers’ Pension Scheme Regulations 2014 (SI 2014/512).

=== Directions and codes ===
HM Treasury issues directions for actuarial valuations and the employer cost cap. Current directions were made in 2023 and there have been earlier amending directions. Schemes must carry out valuations in line with these directions.

The Pensions Regulator publishes a General Code that sets expectations for governance and administration across occupational and public service pension schemes.

== Membership and employers ==
=== Eligibility ===
The scheme covers teaching and lecturing roles in England and Wales where the job is predominantly teaching and the person is aged between 16 and 75. Eligibility applies to full-time and part-time work, with service recorded on actual pensionable earnings.

=== Employer participation ===
Participating employers include state-funded schools, maintained nurseries, academies and academy trusts, as well as further-education colleges. Some higher-education providers also participate, and independent schools may elect to participate subject to scheme rules.

=== Independent schools ===
From 1 August 2021 independent schools have been able to adopt “phased withdrawal”. In a phased-withdrawal school existing members can remain active, while new teaching staff cannot join the scheme except in specified circumstances such as an eligible bulk TUPE transfer.

=== Higher education providers ===
Some universities in England and Wales participate in the scheme for eligible academic staff. Membership is common in post-1992 universities whose status derives from the Further and Higher Education Act 1992, with eligibility set out in the Teachers’ Pension Scheme Regulations 2014.

=== Auto-enrolment duties ===
Employers must automatically enrol eligible jobholders into a qualifying workplace pension. For eligible teaching employment the Teachers’ Pension Scheme is used as the qualifying scheme, and employers must re-enrol eligible staff on the statutory three-year cycle.

=== Membership statistics ===
As of as of March 2024, there were about 687,446 active members and 777,843 deferred members. As of as of March 2025, there were about 771,790 pensions in payment. Figures are taken from the latest departmental annual report and accounts for the scheme.

== Benefits ==
=== Sections and accrual ===
The scheme has two legacy final salary sections and a reformed career average section. Final salary service before 2007 in the NPA 60 section builds pension at 1/80 of final average salary for each year of reckonable service and includes an automatic lump sum of three times the pension. Final salary service after 2006 in the NPA 65 section builds pension at 1/60 with no automatic lump sum.

In the career average section from 2015, pension builds at 1/57 of pensionable earnings each year. While a member is active, the pot of accrued career average pension is revalued each year by the Treasury Pensions Increase rate plus 1.6 percent. If the member leaves service, revaluation from that point follows Pensions Increase only.

=== Retirement routes and ages ===
Normal pension age is 60 or 65 for legacy final salary service and is linked to State Pension age for career average service. Early retirement is possible from age 55, with actuarial reduction, and the normal minimum pension age is scheduled to rise to 57 on 6 April 2028. Late retirement is available, with an actuarial uplift when benefits start after the relevant normal pension age.

Members can take part of their pension as a tax-free lump sum by exchanging pension at a rate of £12 of lump sum for each £1 of annual pension given up, subject to overall limits in tax law. Members with pre-2007 final salary service also receive the automatic lump sum attached to that service.

Phased retirement allows a member to draw up to 75 percent of their benefits and continue working, provided pensionable earnings reduce by at least 20 percent for at least twelve months. Employers and members must meet the timing and evidence rules for a phased retirement application.

Premature retirement may be granted by the employer in specified circumstances. If granted, the employer meets the cost of paying unreduced benefits before the member's normal pension age.

=== Options to increase or shape benefits ===
Members can increase benefits using scheme flexibilities. Faster accrual allows an election in a scheme year to accrue at 1/45, 1/50, or 1/55 instead of 1/57, in return for higher contributions. Additional Pension can be bought in units of £250 per year, by lump sum or instalments, and can be purchased on a member-only or member-and-dependants basis. A Buy Out option lets a new career average member pay additional contributions to remove up to three years of the early-retirement reduction that would otherwise apply if they retire before the career average normal pension age. Buy Out is a one-time election within six months of first entering career average.

=== Leaving and re-joining ===
If a member leaves pensionable service, career average revaluation continues by Pensions Increase. If they return within five years, the break is treated as if they had remained active for revaluation purposes and the additional 1.6 percent is applied for those break years. A final salary link can be retained subject to scheme rules on breaks in service.

=== Ill-health benefits ===
Ill-health retirement provides access to benefits before normal pension age without the usual early-retirement reduction. The scheme has two tiers. A lower tier pays the benefits accrued to date if the member is permanently unable to teach up to normal pension age. An upper tier provides an enhanced award where the member is permanently unable to undertake any gainful employment up to normal pension age.

=== Survivor and dependants’ benefits ===
An adult survivor's pension is payable to an eligible spouse, civil partner, or qualifying partner. For final salary service, the long-term survivor pension is 1/160 of the member's final average salary for each year of survivor-benefits service. For career average service, the long-term survivor pension is 37.5 percent of the member's earned career average pension, with enhancements where death occurs in service.

If a member dies in service, a lump-sum death grant is payable. In the career average section the in-service death grant is three times the member's final full-time equivalent pensionable salary at the date of death. Where a pension is already in payment and has been in payment for less than five years, a supplementary death grant may be paid that equals five times the annual pension less what has already been paid. Out-of-service death grant rules differ by section.

== Contributions and funding ==
=== Funding model ===
The Teachers’ Pension Scheme is pay as you go. Employer and member contributions are paid to central government and pensions in payment are met from public funds. The Department for Education reports on these cash flows in the scheme's annual report and accounts and in the annual Main Estimate.

=== Member contributions ===
Members pay tiered contributions that are set in regulations and structured by the member's annual salary rate for the eligible employment. Bands are normally uprated each April in line with the Consumer Price Index. For 2024 to 2025 the contribution rates remained 7.4 percent, 8.6 percent, 9.6 percent, 10.2 percent, 11.3 percent and 11.7 percent, with salary bands uprated by 6.7 percent. as of April 2025, Teachers’ Pensions confirms that bands are uprated by 1.7 percent and most contribution rates increase by 0.3 percentage points. The employer applies the correct band to each employment based on the annual salary rate and deducts contributions from pensionable earnings in each pay period.

=== Employer contributions and the administration levy ===
The employer contribution rate is set by the scheme valuation in line with HM Treasury directions. as of April 2024, the employer contribution rate is 28.6 percent of pensionable pay. Employers also pay an administration levy of 0.08 percent. Teachers’ Pensions presents the total as 28.68 percent including the levy.

=== Grants and sector support ===
When the employer rate increased in April 2024 the Department for Education provided additional funding for centrally funded sectors. Grants covered schools, high needs settings and centrally employed teachers in 2024 to 2025. There is separate grant guidance for providers with 16 to 19 provision and for further education, with arrangements confirmed for the 2025 to 2026 academic year. The department's consolidated annual report also records over £1.1 billion of additional funding for 2024 to 2025 to support the increase.

=== How rates are set ===
Employer rates are determined by periodic valuations under the Public Service Pensions Act 2013 and HM Treasury's Public Service Pensions Directions. Changes in the SCAPE discount rate feed into the valuation results and therefore into employer contribution rates. The latest change set the SCAPE discount rate at 1.7 percent a year above CPI.

== Governance and administration ==
=== Scheme manager and accountability ===
The Department for Education is the scheme manager for England and Wales. The department reports on governance, risk and internal control in the scheme's annual report and accounts. The accounts are prepared in accordance with government financial reporting requirements and audited on behalf of the Comptroller and Auditor General.

=== Pension Board ===
A Teachers’ Pension Scheme Pension Board assists the scheme manager in securing compliance with the scheme regulations and with applicable law. The Board is chaired by an independent chair and includes five member representatives and five employer representatives.

=== Administration and service delivery ===
Day-to-day administration is delivered under the Teachers’ Pensions brand. Following a re-procurement the Department for Education awarded a contract to Tata Consultancy Services to provide administration services. as of September 2025, the handover to the new provider is scheduled for summer 2026.

=== Employer reporting and contributions ===
Employers are responsible for accurate and timely reporting of service and pay and for paying contributions. Teachers’ Pensions operates Monthly Data Collection, which requires employers or their payroll providers to submit service and salary information each month instead of a single annual return. Guidance and templates are provided through the employer portal.

=== Complaints and dispute resolution ===
Complaints are handled under a two-stage Internal Dispute Resolution Procedure. Members who remain dissatisfied after IDRP can refer matters to The Pensions Ombudsman. The Pensions Regulator's General Code sets expectations for governance and administration across public service pension schemes.

== Valuation and cost control ==
=== Framework and cycle ===
The scheme is subject to periodic actuarial valuations under the Public Service Pensions Act 2013 and HM Treasury Directions. Valuations for unfunded public service schemes are carried out by the Government Actuary's Department and set the employer contribution rate from the following implementation date. The 2020 cycle is the first to use the reformed cost control mechanism and the 2023 Directions.

=== 2020 valuation outcomes ===
The valuation as at 31 March 2020 set an employer contribution rate of 28.6 percent from April 2024. Teachers’ Pensions confirms a separate administration levy of 0.08 percent. The valuation report confirms there was no breach of the reformed cost control mechanism once the economic check was applied.

=== Cost control mechanism ===
Following a review by the Government Actuary and consultation, the Government implemented reforms to the cost control mechanism for the 2020 valuations. The mechanism now operates on a reformed scheme only basis, the corridor is widened to plus or minus 3 percent of pensionable pay, and an economic check is applied before any breach is confirmed.

=== Discount rate and contribution impacts ===
The discount rate used for setting employer contribution rates was updated for the 2020 valuations. The written ministerial statement confirms the use of a SCAPE discount rate of CPI plus 1.7 percent a year, which increases the assessed cost of benefits for unfunded schemes and contributes to higher employer rates from April 2024.

=== Data and methodology ===
Valuation data are drawn from the scheme administrator and documented in a separate data report. Assumptions and methods are set in Treasury Directions with some scheme specific best-estimate assumptions determined by the Secretary of State for Education.

=== Next cycle ===
The next valuation is being undertaken as at 31 March 2024 with publication expected in 2027. Departmental reports explain that outcomes from that cycle will inform future employer contribution rates.

== Legal and policy developments ==
=== McCloud remedy ===
In 2018 the Court of Appeal found that transitional protection in the 2015 public service pension reforms was unlawfully age discriminatory. The Government legislated for the remedy in the Public Service Pensions and Judicial Offices Act 2022, which closed legacy final salary sections to further accrual from 1 April 2022 and provided a framework for remediable service between 2015 and 2022. For the Teachers’ Pension Scheme, detailed rules are set out in the Teachers’ Pension Scheme (Remediable Service) Regulations 2023. Departmental reports describe implementation through Remediable Service Statements and choice exercises.

=== Cost control mechanism reforms ===
Following a review by the Government Actuary the Government reformed the public service pensions cost control mechanism for use from the 2020 valuations. The mechanism now operates on a reformed scheme only basis, the corridor is plus or minus three percentage points of pensionable pay, and an economic check applies before any breach leads to benefit or contribution changes.

=== Independent schools: phased withdrawal policy ===
From 1 August 2021 independent schools that participate in the scheme have been able to adopt phased withdrawal. Existing members can remain active while new teaching staff cannot join the scheme in that school except in specified circumstances. Teachers’ Pensions has issued employer guidance and policy updates on the process.

=== Minimum pension age change ===
The normal minimum pension age for most workplace pensions will increase from 55 to 57 on 6 April 2028. Teachers’ Pensions guidance and member communications reflect this timetable for early retirement options under scheme rules.

=== Contracted-out benefit confirmations ===
In 2025 the Department for Work and Pensions announced that it will introduce legislation to address the Court of Appeal's decision in Virgin Media v NTL Pension Trustees on contracted-out benefit changes. The proposed legislation would allow retrospective actuarial confirmation of certain past alterations that affected contracted-out rights. Public service schemes, including the Teachers’ Pension Scheme, have noted the policy development in governance updates.

== Statistics ==
Headline figures are drawn from the scheme's audited annual report and accounts for 2024 to 2025 and the GOV.UK summary page.

Key statistics for the Teachers’ Pension Scheme (England and Wales)
Item	Figure	Date
Combined pension liability	£290.6 billion	31 March 2025
Pensions in payment (total)	771,790	31 March 2025
Active members	687,446	31 March 2024
Deferred members	777,843	31 March 2024
Contributing employers	12,911	2024–25
Contributions receivable (total)	£11,787 million	Year to 31 March 2025
Employer contribution rate	28.6% of pensionable pay	2024–25

Note: Active and deferred member counts are reported one year in arrears in the annual report.

== Devolved administrations ==
Separate teachers’ pension schemes operate in Scotland and Northern Ireland under their own regulations and administrators. This article covers the Teachers’ Pension Scheme for England and Wales only.

=== Scotland ===
The Scottish Teachers’ Pension Scheme 2015 is a career average scheme that accrues at 1/57 of pensionable earnings and has a normal pension age linked to State Pension age. It is established by the Teachers’ Pension Scheme (Scotland) Regulations 2014 and is administered by the Scottish Public Pensions Agency.

=== Northern Ireland ===
The Northern Ireland Teachers’ Pension Scheme 2015 is established by the Teachers’ Pension Scheme Regulations (Northern Ireland) 2014 and is administered by the Department of Education's Teachers’ Pensions Team, which also provides online member and employer portals.

== See also ==
- Local Government Pension Scheme
- NHS Pension Scheme
- Pensions in the United Kingdom
- Public Service Pensions Act 2013
- State Pension (United Kingdom)
