= Northern Ireland Local Government Officers' Superannuation Committee =

Pension scheme in Northern Ireland

Northern Ireland Local Government Officers' Superannuation Committee (NILGOSC)
- Formation: 2002; 24 years ago
- Type: Pension fund
- Region served: Northern Ireland
- Services: Provide pensions to government workers
- Official language: English
- Parent organization: Department for Communities
- Website: nilgosc.org.uk

The Northern Ireland Local Government Officers' Superannuation Committee (NILGOSC) is the largest public sector pension schemes. It is a defined benefit pension plan.

It is regulated by the Local Government Pension Scheme Regulations (Northern Ireland) 2002 and The Local Government Pension Scheme Regulations (Northern Ireland) 2014.

== History ==
The Committee was established in 2002.

In 2016, NILGOSC committed £100,000,000 to M&G residential property.

In 2017, Northern Trust was appointed to manage the scheme.

In 2018 the pension fund was not criticised for 'not doing enough' with regard to climate change by environmentalists.

== See also ==
- Pensions in the United Kingdom
- Local government
- Teachers' Pension Scheme
- UK labour law
