= David Norgrove =

English businessman and government (born 1948)

Sir David Norgrove

Chairman of the UK Statistics Authority
- In office March 2017 – 31 March 2022
- Prime Minister: Theresa May; Boris Johnson
- Preceded by: Sir Andrew Dilnot
- Succeeded by: Sir Robert Chote

Chairman of The Pensions Regulator
- In office 2005–2011
- Succeeded by: Michael O'Higgins

Personal details
- Born: David Ronald Norgrove; 23 January 1948 (age 78) Peckham, London, England
- Spouse: Jenny Norgrove
- Children: 3 (2 daughters, 1 son)
- Education: Christ's Hospital
- Alma mater: Exeter College, Oxford
- Occupation: Chairman of The Pensions Regulator

Sir David Ronald Norgrove (born 23 January 1948) is an English businessman and government official, who was chair of the UK Statistics Authority from 2017 to 2022. He was previously the first chairman of The Pensions Regulator, and then chair of the Low Pay Commission.

== Early life ==
Norgrove was born on 23 January 1948 in Peckham, London. He was educated at Christ's Hospital School and read history at Exeter College, Oxford. He gained a diploma in Economics at Cambridge University and then a master's degree in economics at the London School of Economics.

== Career ==
Norgrove started his career as an economist at HM Treasury (1972–85), where his time included a secondment to the First National Bank of Chicago.

Norgrove was private secretary to Prime Minister Margaret Thatcher between 1985 and 1988.

In 1988 he joined Marks & Spencer, where he held several positions: from 1988 to 1999 he was Director of Europe; Worldwide franchising; Menswear and Strategy. In September 1999 he became chairman of Marks & Spencer's Ventures Division and a year later he was appointed to the executive board as executive director for Strategy, International and Ventures.

Norgrove was heavily involved in the early recovery of Marks and Spencer but in January 2004 he was fired from his role as director of clothing following poor Christmas sales. He continued in his position as chair of the trustees of the Marks & Spencer pension fund until later in the year, playing a role in the attempt by Philip Green to acquire the company.

In March 2004 he was appointed to the board of the British Museum, later becoming deputy chairman. In November 2009 he became the Chairman of The British Museum Friends, where he retired as a trustee in 2012. He was a trustee of Amnesty International Charitable Trust from 2008 to 2014.

Norgrove was appointed as the first chair of The Pensions Regulator between 2005 and 2010 and subsequently named one of the hundred most influential people in the capital markets by Financial News. In 2011 he joined pension consultants PensionsFirst as chairman. From May 2009 until December 2016 he was the chairman of the Low Pay Commission. In April 2017 he became chair of the UK Statistics Authority.

In 2022, Sir Robert Chote was selected to replace Norgrove as chair of the UK Statistics Authority.

== Family Justice Review ==
Norgrove chaired the Family Justice Review in 2011–12. This recommended substantial changes to speed up public law proceedings (cases concerning the protection of children) and to help family justice operate better as a system. In private law (divorce and separation) it recommended changes to help couples avoid the need to undertake court proceedings, for example increased use of mediation. Most media attention was paid to a recommendation that there should not be legislation to create a presumption around parental involvement in children's lives after separation. This was controversial, particularly with groups campaigning for the rights of fathers, and has been interpreted by some as a recommendation that fathers should not have equal rights to children.

In 2012, Norgrove was appointed as first chair of the Family Justice Board, which brings together the main agencies involved in family justice to promote change and reform of the system. He left the Board in mid-2016, since when it has been chaired by government ministers.

=== Criticism of the review ===
The Norgrove Report extensively cited evidence from Australia, claiming that cases there showed that giving parents the legal right to a meaningful relationship with their children put them at increased risk of violence as well as increasing litigation. The evidence cited was later reviewed by Professor Patrick Parkinson of the University of Sydney, who presented his findings to the UK parliament's Justice Select Committee in December 2012. He noted the evidence showed litigation in child custody cases had decreased by a third, and stated that Norgrove's claim of the meaningful relationship provision putting children at an increased risk of violence was "without foundation". Parkinson concluded that: "almost none of the arguments made by the Norgrove Committee can be supported by the available evidence" and that the report "made a series of claims that had little or no factual foundation".

Dr Rob George of University College London's Faculty of Laws criticised Norgrove's comments as "extraordinary that the report identified that there would be 'worse outcomes' [for families] as a result of its reforms, but nonetheless proceeded with them without any modification."

George also criticised Norgrove's comments from the report which advocated a reduction in unnecessary litigation by "encouraging people to take greater personal responsibility for their problem" claiming that it was "doubtful that the decisions of your former partner to stop you seeing your children, or to deny you access to a fair share of the family assets, or to subject you to domestic abuse, are properly seen as 'personal choices' that you have made. Nor is it obvious that by avoiding court, you will be able to take 'personal responsibility' for resolving that dispute."

Further criticism of the review came from policy group The Centre for Social Justice, with the organisation's Gavin Poole stating: "Norgrove's refusal to acknowledge the importance of fathers and recommend a change to the law ignores the vast majority of public opinion and evidence about the devastating effect that absent dads have on children."

== Personal life and honours ==
Norgrove is married to Jenny and they have two daughters and a son. He lives in Islington, North London and Combe, Berkshire.

He was knighted in the 2016 New Year Honours for services to the low paid and the family justice system.
