= John Hills (social scientist) =

British academic (1954–2020)

Sir John Robert Hills
- Born: 29 July 1954
- Died: 21 December 2020 (aged 66)

Sir John Robert Hills, CBE (29 July 1954 – 21 December 2020) was a British academic, latterly professor of Social Policy at the London School of Economics. He acted as director of the ESRC Research Centre for the Analysis of Social Exclusion from 1997. His work focused on inequality, and the role of social policy over the life course.

== Education ==
John Hills was educated at Nottingham High School and Abingdon School. At Abingdon he was Head of Dayboys and won the St Catherine's prize for Intellectual Initiative, the Smith Chemistry prize and Ingham Physics Prize, in addition to English and Mathematics prizes. Before going to Cambridge he conducted research at Euratom. He studied at the University of Cambridge for his undergraduate degree, and at the University of Birmingham for his master's degree (MSocSc Economics, 1980).

== Work ==
Hills worked at the LSE from 1986 until his death in 2020, having previously held research posts at HM Treasury and the Institute for Fiscal Studies. His appointment as Director of the Centre for the Analysis of Social Exclusion (CASE) in 1997 coincided with the election of New Labour and a greater level of interest in issues around poverty and social exclusion.

He took part in a number of high-profile reviews for government. These included

- a review of fuel poverty in 2011;
- a 2010 report on inequality for the National Equality panel; and,
- a 2007 review of council housing entitled Ends and Means.

Hills was one of three commissioners on the Pensions Commission. Among the most important reforms proposed by the Pensions Commission during his tenure was a new type of non-state pension, which they called NPSS (National Pension and Savings Scheme). This is a pension scheme where people are 'auto-enrolled', and which has a compulsory employer contribution. This idea was later renamed as 'personal accounts' and was being introduced in 2012 in the form of the National Employment Savings Trust.

He was appointed Commander of the Order of the British Empire (CBE) in the 1998 New Year honours for services to social security analysis and was knighted in the 2013 Birthday Honours for services to social policy development.

He was Fellow of the British Academy and a member of the Academy of Social Sciences. He was at the time of his death one of the sub-panel members for the Research Excellence Framework in the field of social work and social policy & administration.

== Personal ==
He was married to Professor Anne Power of the London School of Economics.

== Publications ==
- Towards a More Equal Society?: Poverty, Inequality and Policy Since 1997 (The Policy Press, 2009: coeditor with T. Sefton and K. Stewart)
- A More Equal Society: New Labour, poverty, inequality and exclusion (The Policy Press, 2005; coeditor with K. Stewart)
- Inequality and the State (Oxford University Press, 2004)
- Understanding Social Exclusion (Oxford University Press, 2002; co-editor with J. Le Grand and D. Piachaud)

== See also ==
- List of Old Abingdonians
