= NHS Employers =

Organisation that represents employers in Britain's NHS

- Formation: 2004
- Chief Executive: Ben Morrin
- Website: www.nhsemployers.org

NHS Employers are the employers’ organisation for the NHS in England and Wales. They support workforce leaders and represent employers and systems to develop a sustainable workforce and be the best employers they can be.

They also manage the relationships with NHS trade unions on behalf of the Secretary of State for Health and Social Care.

NHS Employers was formed in 2004 and is part of The NHS Alliance (previously the NHS Confederation).

== History ==
In January 2004 the Department of Health announced the responsibility for negotiating staff terms and conditions was to be devolved by them to the NHS Confederation. In November 2004 NHS Employers was formed, and became the body that negotiates healthcare staff contracts on behalf of the government. They regularly collect and analyse the views of employers.

In September 2014, Danny Mortimer was appointed Chief Executive of NHS Employers, succeeding Dean Royles. After 11 years as chief executive, Danny Mortimer left NHS Employers to become the director general for people, working across the Department of Health and Social Care and NHS England. Dean Royles returned as interim chief executive in January 2026 before Ben Morrin was appointed permanent chief executive in July 2026.

== Initiatives ==
In 2005, most NHS trusts estimated that around half of their staff were suffering from workplace stress, but less than a third of health service managers that responded were able to say that their trusts had a stress management policy at the time.

In 2012 they launched a Speaking Up Charter, asking NHS trusts to commit to actions that would help staff to raise concerns.

In June 2014 they published statistics highlighting the proportion of women in various sections of the NHS workforce.

== See also ==
- Agenda for Change, the grading and pay system for NHS staff, excepting doctors, dentists, apprentices and some senior managers
- NHS Pension Scheme
