= Pensions Commission =

The Pensions Commission was a non-departmental public body in the United Kingdom, reporting to the Secretary of State for Work and Pensions, set up to keep under review the regime for UK private pensions and long-term savings.

The commission was announced in the Pensions Green Paper published in December 2002. It consisted of three Commissioners and a small secretariat. The chair was Adair Turner, the other members were John Hills and Jeannie Drake. The Commission has now reported and been wound up.

A more recent Pensions Commission was set up chaired by John Hutton.

== Remit ==
The Commission was responsible for looking at how the pension system was developing over time and for making recommendations on whether the pension system should move beyond the current voluntarist approach.

== Report ==
The Commission published its First Report on 12 October 2004, setting out a detailed and comprehensive analysis of the UK pensions system. Their Second Report, published on 30 November 2005, presented its conclusions on the likely evolution of the UK pension system if policy remained unchanged, and the Commission's recommendations for a new policy direction. A final statement was published on 4 April 2006, detailing its response to specific issues which had arisen in the debate on pension reform since publication of the Second Report.

The Commission's reports are often collectively referred to as the Turner Report.
