= Independent Public Services Pensions Commission =

The UK Chancellor invited John Hutton to chair an independent commission on public service pension provision. This was intended to reduce the otherwise increasing cost of taxpayer-funded state pensions (as life expectancy increased) while ensuring adequate levels of retirement income.

== Recommendations made in the report ==
- The Government should make clear its assessment of the role of public service pension schemes which should be to ensure adequate levels of retirement income for public service pensioners.
- Public service employers take greater account of public service pensions when constructing remuneration packages and designing workforce strategies.
- The Government should ensure that public service schemes, along with a full state pension, deliver at least adequate levels of income for scheme members.
- The Government must honour in full the pension promises that have been accrued by scheme members. This includes the final salary link of all contributions to date.
- Members of the current defined benefit public should be moved as soon as possible to new schemes.
- All public service pension schemes should regularly publish data which is produced to common standards and collated centrally.
- A new career average revalued earnings (CARE) scheme should be adopted for general use in the public service schemes.
- Pension benefits should be uprated in line with average earnings during the accrual phase for active scheme members. Post-retirement, pensions in payment should be indexed in line with prices to maintain their purchasing power and adequacy during retirement.
- A single benefit design should apply across the whole income range. The differing characteristics of higher and lower earners should be addressed through tiered contribution rates.
- Members should have greater choice over when to start drawing their pension benefits.
- The Government should increase the member’s Normal Pension Age in the new schemes so that it is in line with their State Pension Age.
- The Government, on behalf of the taxpayer, should set out a fixed cost ceiling: the proportion of pensionable pay that they will contribute, on average, to employees’ pensions over the long term. If this is exceeded then there should be a consultation process to bring costs back within the ceiling, with an automatic default change if agreement cannot be reached.
- It is in principle undesirable for future non-public service workers to have access to public service pension schemes.
- The consultation process itself should be centrally co-ordinated. However, the consultation on details should be conducted scheme by scheme involving employees and their representatives.

== Reactions ==
The Pensions Policy Institute pointed out that these Defined Benefit schemes are available in the public sector but largely not available in the private sector which are Defined Contribution. Several public sector Unions called strikes.

== Government implementation ==
The government held consultations with the unions in 2011. In December they announced they had reached agreements with the four largest unions. A notable change from the original report was accrual rates were higher (more put in each year) and revaluation factors were lower (the growth of earlier year's contributions) than the Commission had recommended. There was also a guarantee for people less than 10 years from retirement age.
