= Michael O'Higgins (economist) =

Irish economist

Michael O'Higgins is an Irish business consultant and policy analyst. He was Chairman of the Local Pensions Partnership from 2015 to 2021 and remains chair of the Advisory Committees to several Yorkshire Fund Managers BuyOut Funds.

He was Chair of the Channel Islands Competition and Regulatory Authorities from 2016 to 2019, the NHS Confederation. from 2012 to 2015, chairman of The Pensions Regulator until 2013 and chair of the Audit Commission from 2006 to 2012. He was also a non-executive director of HM Treasury and chair of the Treasury Group Audit Committee from 2008 to 2014 and a non-executive director of Network Rail from 2012 to 2018.

He was also a managing partner with PA Consulting, leading its Government and IT Consulting Groups. He was formerly a partner at Price Waterhouse, and worked at the Organisation for Economic Co-operation and Development in Paris. He has held academic posts at the University of Bath, the London School of Economics, Harvard University and the Australian National University.
