= Pay-as-you-go pension plan =

Retirement scheme

A pay-as-you-go pension plan (also called a "pre-funded pension plan") is a retirement scheme in which a contributor can either have a regular contribution deducted from each paycheck or make a lump-sum contribution to a retirement fund.

With such a plan, the contributor decides how much to contribute to the fund and chooses how it is invested. Upon retirement, the contributor can have the fund balance paid in a lump sum, in monthly installments, or in a combination of the two.

== Difference ==
Private pay-as-you-go pension plans are not to be confused with pay-as-you-go pension systems. The latter term refers to state pension systems funded by contributions from current workers (rather than by individual past contributions from current beneficiaries). The underlying pay-as-you-go (PAYG or PAYGO) principle is applied in social insurance systems across the world, see Generational contract.
