= Pensions in the United Kingdom =

Pensions in the United Kingdom are organised around three pillars: a contributory State Pension that provides a baseline income, private pensions delivered through the workplace or on a personal basis, and public service pension schemes established in law. Oversight is split between The Pensions Regulator for trust-based occupational schemes and the Financial Conduct Authority for contract-based pensions and retail conduct, with a published joint regulatory strategy for the sector.

Most employees now enter saving through automatic enrolment, and saving mainly builds up in defined contribution arrangements. In 2024 about 89% of eligible employees in Great Britain were saving into a workplace pension, an estimated 21.7 million people. Patterns of access to defined contribution savings have continued to evolve since the 2015 pension freedoms, with both drawdown and annuity products used.

The State Pension is financed from National Insurance and depends on an individual’s contribution record. The full rate of the New State Pension in 2025 to 2026 is £230.25 a week.

Public service schemes operate under the framework created by the Public Service Pensions Act 2013. Most central government schemes are unfunded and the Local Government Pension Scheme is funded. On the Whole of Government Accounts basis the UK’s net public sector pension liability was £1,415.0 billion at 31 March 2023.

Digital and data initiatives sit alongside these structures. Under the pensions dashboards programme, schemes and providers must connect to a common digital architecture by 31 October 2026 so that individuals can find their pensions information in one place.

== Overview ==
The United Kingdom pension system has three main parts: a contributory State Pension, private pensions provided through the workplace or on a personal basis, and public service pension schemes established by statute. Most employees are brought into saving through automatic enrolment. Private provision includes defined benefit and defined contribution schemes, and there is a developing collective defined contribution model.

Regulation is divided between public bodies. The Pensions Regulator oversees the governance and administration of trust-based workplace schemes and public service schemes; the Financial Conduct Authority regulates personal and other contract-based pensions. The Money and Pensions Service provides free pensions guidance to the public through its MoneyHelper service. The Pension Protection Fund acts as the statutory safety net for eligible defined benefit schemes.

Public service pension schemes operate within a statutory framework set by the Public Service Pensions Act 2013. Periodic actuarial valuations for those schemes are carried out under HM Treasury Directions and published by the Government Actuary’s Department and responsible departments.

A statutory pensions dashboards programme aims to connect schemes and providers to a common digital architecture by 31 October 2026, with staged connection guidance issued by the Department for Work and Pensions.

== History ==
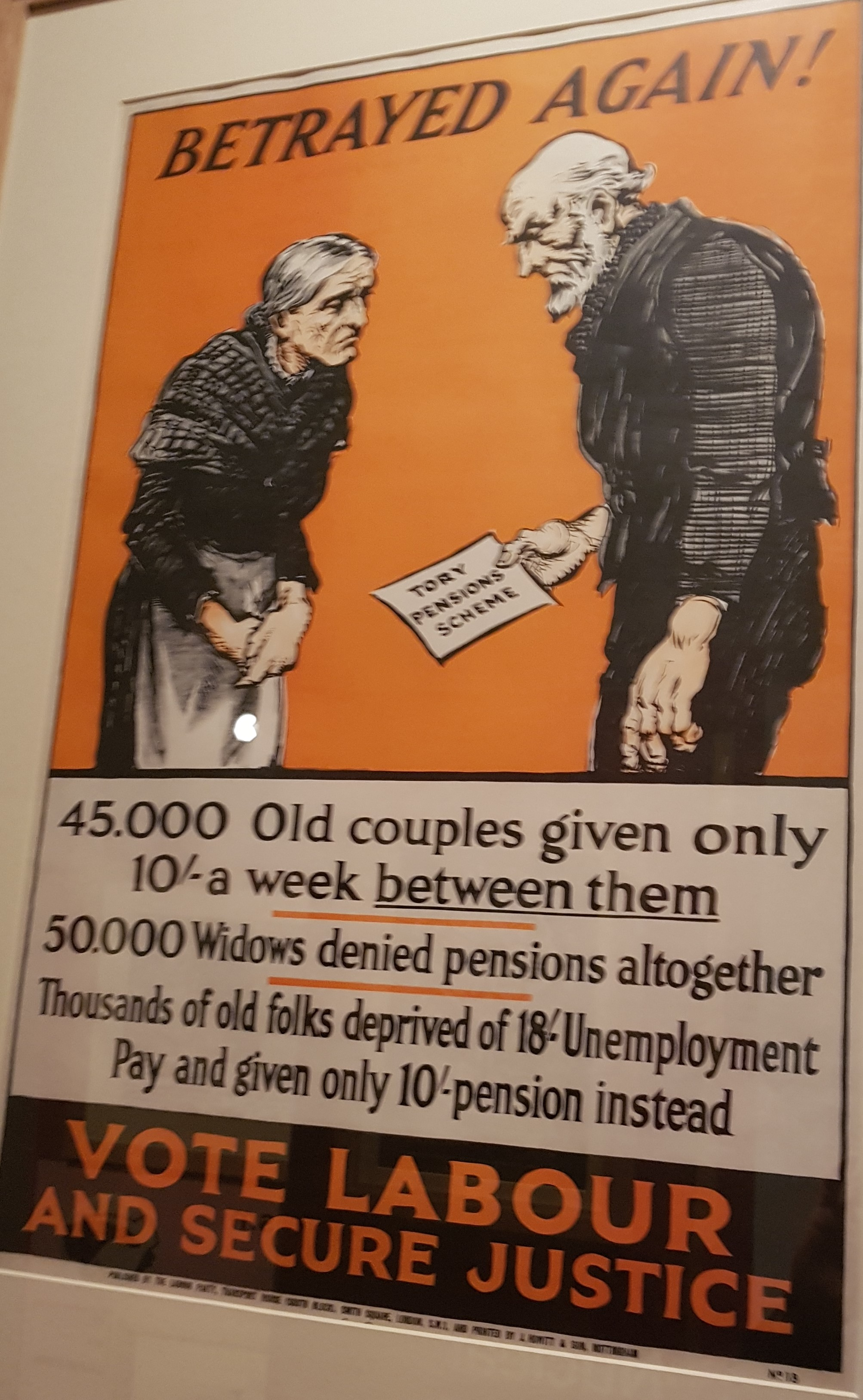
Betrayed Again: Labour Party poster

Until the 20th century, poverty was seen as a quasi-criminal state, and this was reflected in the Vagabonds and Beggars Act 1494 that imprisoned beggars. In Elizabethan times, English Poor Laws represented a shift whereby the poor were seen merely as morally degenerate, and were expected to perform forced labour in workhouses.

The beginning of the modern state pension was the Old Age Pensions Act 1908, which provided 5 shillings (£0.25) a week for those over age 70 whose annual means did not exceed £31 10s. (£31.50). It coincided with the Royal Commission on the Poor Laws and Relief of Distress 1905–1909 and was the first step in the Liberal welfare reforms towards the completion of a system of social security, with unemployment and health insurance through the National Insurance Act 1911.

In the early 20th century, occupational (workplace) pension schemes started to become more common, with one driver being the Finance Act 1921 which provided tax-relief on pension scheme contributions.

After the Second World War, the National Insurance Act 1946 completed universal coverage of social security. The National Assistance Act 1948 (11 & 12 Geo. 6. c. 29) formally abolished the poor law, and gave a minimum income to those not paying National Insurance. The Basic State Pension was also introduced in 1948. Occupational pension schemes also flourished after the Second World War, with pensions becoming a key tool to attract and retain staff.

In the second half of the 20th century, there was a succession of legislative changes to protect pension scheme members, prevent abuse of the generous tax-reliefs available and prevent fraudulent activity. Some of these changes were precipitated by Robert Maxwell's plundering of the Mirror Pension Funds. This led to the Goode Report, whose recommendations were implemented by comprehensive statutes in the Pension Schemes Act 1993 and the Pensions Act 1995.

The early 1990s established the existing framework for state pensions in the Social Security Contributions and Benefits Act 1992 and Superannuation and other Funds (Validation) Act 1992.

In 2002 the Pensions Commission was established as a cross-party body to review pensions in the United Kingdom. The first Act to follow was the Pensions Act 2004, which updated regulation by replacing the Occupational Pensions Regulatory Authority (OPRA) with the Pensions Regulator and relaxing the stringency of minimum funding requirements for pensions, while ensuring protection for insolvent businesses. In a major update of the state pension, the Pensions Act 2007 aligned and raised retirement ages. Since then, the Pensions Act 2008 has set up automatic enrolment for occupational pensions, and a public competitor designed to be a low-cost and efficient fund manager, called the National Employment Savings Trust (or "Nest").

Partially as a result of the new regulation, since the turn of the century there has been significant decline in the provision of defined benefit pensions in the private sector, with money purchase arrangements increasingly being used for new benefit accrual.

=== Pensions Act 2011 ===
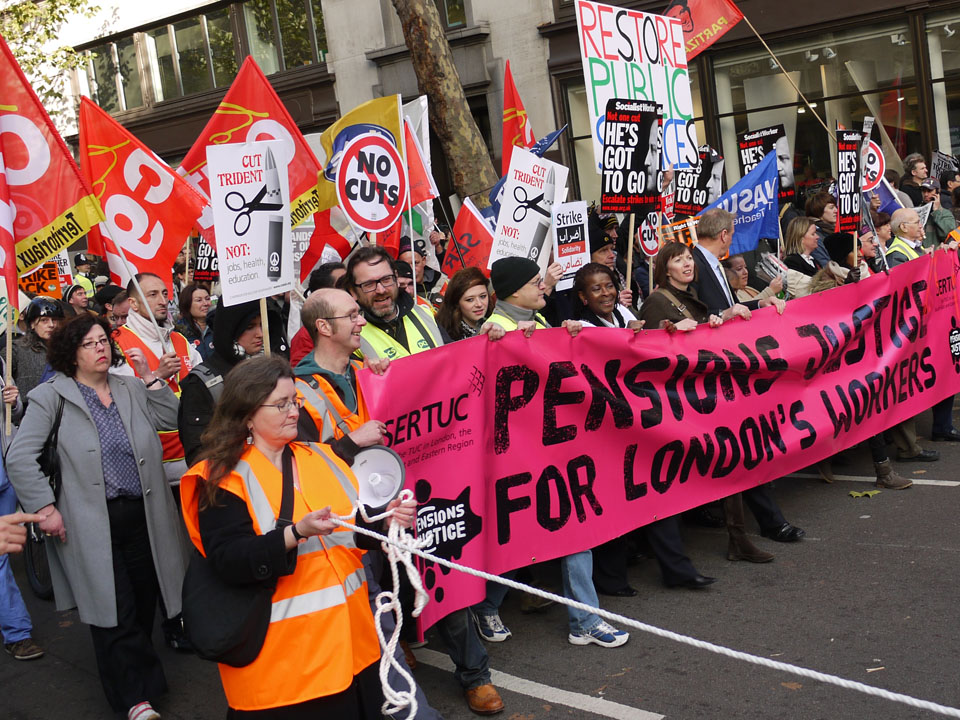
Public sector trade union workers marching in Aldwych in November 2011

This Act amended the timetable for increasing the state pension age to 66. Under the Pensions Act 2007, the increase to 66 was due to take effect between 2024 and 2026. This Act brought forward the increase, so that state pension age for both men and women began rising from 65 in December 2018 and reached 66 in October 2020. As a result of bringing forward the increase to 66, the timetable contained in the Pension Act 1995 for equalising women's and men's state pension ages at 65 by April 2020 was accelerated, so that the women's state pension age reached 65 in November 2018.

The Act introduced amendments to primary legislation to amend the regulatory framework for the duty on employers to automatically enrol eligible workers into a qualifying pension scheme and to contribute to the scheme. These measures implemented recommendations from the Making Automatic Enrolment Work review and revised some of the automatic enrolment provisions in the Pensions Act 2008.

The Act amended existing legislation that provided for revaluation or indexation of occupational pensions and payments by the Pension Protection Fund.

The Act defined "money purchase benefits" for the purpose of pensions law. This was a consequence of the judgment of the Supreme Court in Houldsworth v Bridge Trustees and Secretary of State for Work and Pensions. The Act took powers to make transitional, consequential or supplementary provision as well and to make further amendments to the definition of "money purchase benefits".

The Act introduced provisions into the current judicial pension schemes to allow contributions to be taken towards the cost of providing personal pension benefits to members of those schemes.

The Act also contained a number of measures to correct particular references in the existing body of pensions-related legislation and other small and technical measures to both state and private pension legislation. This included the following measures:

- increased flexibility in the date of consolidation of additional state pension;
- abolition of new awards of Payable Uprated Contracted-out Deduction Increments (PUCODIs);
- Financial Assistance Scheme: amendments to legislation concerning transfer of assets, and amount of payments;
- miscellaneous amendments to Pension Protection Fund legislation;
- amendments to legislation concerning payments of surplus to employers;
- amendments to legislation concerning the requirement for indexation of cash balance benefits; and
- corrective amendments to legislation concerning the calculation of debt owing to a pension scheme.

=== Since 2011 ===
Under the Mansion House Accord, agreed at the Mansion House in the City of London, pension schemes agreed on a voluntary basis to invest at least 10% of their funds in private markets by 2030, with at least 50% of this being invested in UK-based assets.

In November 2023, The Trussell Trust calculated that a single adult in the UK in 2023 needs at least £29,500 a year to have an acceptable standard of living, up from £25,000 in 2022.

On 14 November 2024, Rachel Reeves announced plans to merge pension funds into megafunds to unlock up to £80 billion for investment and boost the UK's economic growth. The reform, set to manage £500 billion by 2030, drew inspiration from similar initiatives in Australia and Canada. While business leaders welcomed the proposal, they expressed concerns about the government's recent budget and its impact on confidence in the UK economy, which has struggled since the 2008 financial crisis.

== State pensions ==
The UK State Pension provides a contributory foundation income in later life. There are two systems: the new State Pension for people who reach State Pension age (SPA) on or after 6 April 2016, and the basic State Pension with additional pension for those who reached SPA before that date.

=== Entitlement ===
Under the new system, entitlement is based on an individual’s own National Insurance record. A minimum of 10 qualifying years is needed to receive any new State Pension, and the full rate is usually reached with 35 qualifying years. The actual amount can be higher or lower due to transitional rules and past contracting out. People who reached SPA before 6 April 2016 remain under the pre-2016 basic plus additional structure.

=== Uprating ===
The basic and new State Pensions must be increased at least in line with earnings each year under statute. Since 2011 governments have applied the “triple lock” policy, increasing by the highest of earnings growth, CPI inflation, or 2.5% with a temporary suspension in 2022 to 2023. For 2025–26 the uprating was 4.1% in line with earnings growth in May to July 2024. The Office for Budget Responsibility has highlighted that the triple lock adds long-run uncertainty to State Pension spending projections.

=== Current rates (2025–26) ===
Headline weekly rates from April 2025
Pension	Full rate (per week)
New State Pension (post-2016)	£230.25
Basic State Pension (pre-2016 system)	£176.45

=== State Pension age ===
SPA is 66 for men and women, rising to 67 between 2026 and 2028 under the Pensions Act 2014, and to 68 between 2044 and 2046 under current legislation. A third review of SPA was launched in July 2025 to consider whether the rules remain appropriate in light of life expectancy and other evidence. As of October 2025 it is in progress and outcomes are pending.

=== Pension Credit ===
Pension Credit is the main means-tested benefit for pensioners on low incomes. From April 2025 the standard minimum guarantee is £227.10 per week for single claimants and £346.60 for couples, uprated in line with earnings.

== Private pensions ==
Private pensions are arrangements outside the State Pension. They are delivered through trust-based occupational schemes regulated by The Pensions Regulator (TPR) and contract-based personal or workplace pensions regulated by the Financial Conduct Authority (FCA). Automatic enrolment is the main way employees join, and most new saving now builds up in defined contribution (DC) schemes, especially multi-employer master trusts.

=== Automatic enrolment ===
Automatic enrolment requires employers to place eligible workers into a qualifying workplace pension and to pay contributions. It is the entry point for most private pension saving and has increased participation since 2012. For 2025 to 2026 the earnings trigger is £10,000 and the qualifying earnings band is £6,240 to £50,270. Monthly equivalents are £833 for the trigger and £520 to £4,189 for the band. DWP reviews these thresholds each year and publishes supporting analysis. In 2024 about 89% of eligible employees in Great Britain were saving into a workplace pension, an estimated 21.7 million people. Parliament gave powers in 2023 to lower the minimum age to 18 and to remove the lower earnings limit, but commencement depends on secondary legislation and timing was not set as of July 2025. These duties have shifted most new private pension saving into DC schemes.

=== Defined contribution market ===
Because most new savers build DC pots, the structure of the DC market matters for outcomes. TPR’s DC landscape 2024 reported total DC assets of about £204.6 billion in 2024, of which master trusts held about £166 billion and around 91% of memberships. The number of small non-micro DC or hybrid schemes fell by about 15% year on year. These figures were published in March 2025. What savers receive then depends on what they pay and how investments perform.

==== Personal and contract-based pensions ====
Contract-based pensions are arrangements made between an individual and a provider that are regulated by the FCA. For workplace use they are overseen by independent governance committees that assess value for money and disclose costs and charges. They sit alongside trust-based occupational schemes covered elsewhere in this section.

===== Personal pensions =====
A personal pension is a private arrangement an individual can set up with a provider. It is usually a form of defined contribution saving and can be used by people who are self-employed or those who want to save more in addition to a workplace scheme. Before 1988 the main comparable product was the retirement annuity contract, which is closed to new business. Since 2015 people do not have to buy an annuity and can use drawdown or lump sums subject to tax rules.

===== Stakeholder pensions =====
Stakeholder pensions are a type of personal pension that meet standards in regulations, including a statutory cap on product charges and rules on access and flexibility. The previous requirement for many employers to designate a stakeholder scheme ended in 2012 with the introduction of automatic enrolment. Where a stakeholder scheme is used as a qualifying workplace pension, the workplace charge cap applies to the default arrangement under FCA rules.

===== Group personal pensions =====
A group personal pension (GPP) is a collection of individual personal pension policies arranged by an employer with a single provider. It is contract-based and falls within FCA rules, including independent governance committees for workplace schemes and disclosure of costs and charges.

===== Self-invested personal pensions =====
A self-invested personal pension (SIPP) allows a wider investment range and greater member direction over how savings are invested. SIPPs are regulated as personal pensions and are often used by individuals who want to choose or manage investments themselves.

=== Costs and value ===
A statutory charge cap limits the level of administration and investment charges in default arrangements used for automatic enrolment, currently 0.75% a year. Trustees and managers must assess compliance over the charges year with reference to statutory guidance. From 6 April 2023 schemes may smooth or disapply certain performance fees when assessing compliance, within conditions set out in DWP guidance and TPR materials. Government, TPR and the FCA are developing a joint value for money framework for workplace DC pensions that would require comparable disclosures, benchmarking and action where arrangements persistently underperform. At retirement, costs and returns shape the choices people make.

=== Decumulation after the 2015 pension freedoms ===
Since 2015 most savers can access DC pots from age 55 subject to tax rules. In 2024 to 2025 the FCA reported 961,575 pension plans accessed for the first time, with sales of drawdown up by 25.5% year on year and annuity sales up by 7.8%. Government proposed duties on trustees to offer guided retirement options, which were before Parliament in 2025. CDC offers a different way to share risks that sits alongside DC rather than replacing it.

=== Collective defined contribution ===
Collective defined contribution (CDC) schemes pool investment and longevity risks between members. TPR’s CDC Code of Practice has been in force since 1 August 2022 and sets the authorisation framework. TPR’s authorised list shows one authorised CDC scheme, the Royal Mail Collective Pension Plan. Government has consulted on extending CDC to multi-employer and similar arrangements. The House of Commons Library summarised the position in July 2025. Many workers also hold accrued defined benefit rights that sit outside CDC.

=== Defined benefit and the PPF ===
Most private sector defined benefit (DB) schemes are closed to new members or to future accrual. The Pension Protection Fund (PPF) provides a statutory safety net if an eligible sponsoring employer becomes insolvent. The PPF 7800 index showed an aggregate surplus as of October 2025. For 2025 to 2026 the PPF confirmed that it would not charge a conventional levy, which it estimated would save around £45 million across about 5,000 DB schemes. For structure, risk profile and long-run trends, the PPF’s Purple Book is the core statistical reference. Reforms to consolidate data and pots aim to make the system easier to navigate.

=== Consolidation and data ===
To reduce fragmentation from deferred small DC pots, government proposes a multiple default consolidator model, initially for pots below £1,000, with an authorisation regime for consolidators and a Small Pots Data Platform to support matching and transfer at scale. Schemes and providers must also connect to the pensions dashboards digital architecture by 31 October 2026, with enforcement available to regulators for non-compliance. DWP has issued staged connection guidance for trustees and providers.

== Public service pensions ==
Public service pensions cover staff in the civil service, health, teaching, armed forces, police, fire and local government. Most schemes were reformed under the Public Service Pensions Act 2013 to provide career average revalued earnings benefits with normal pension age linked to State Pension age, except for the uniformed services where the normal pension age is 60. The reforms also introduced cost control and stronger governance requirements at scheme level. Public service schemes are regulated for governance and administration by The Pensions Regulator (TPR).

=== Scheme design since 2015 and the discrimination remedy ===
From 2014 in the Local Government Pension Scheme (LGPS) and from 2015 in other services, new career average schemes replaced most final salary arrangements, with transitional protection for older members. In 2018 the courts held that this protection was unlawfully discriminatory. Parliament enacted the Public Service Pensions and Judicial Offices Act 2022 to fix the issue. From 1 April 2022 all active members are in the reformed schemes. For service in the 2015 to 2022 period, most members will make a deferred choice at retirement between legacy and reformed scheme benefits, a process known as the deferred choice underpin. Implementation is being taken forward through Treasury Directions and scheme regulations.

=== How the schemes are financed ===
Most public service schemes are unfunded and operate on a pay as you go basis. The main exception is the LGPS, which is funded and invested. Public sector pension liabilities are reported in the Whole of Government Accounts. In 2022 to 2023 the reported net liability was £1,415.0 billion, reflecting movements in discount rates and other actuarial assumptions.

=== Valuations and cost control ===
Public service schemes undergo periodic actuarial valuations set by HM Treasury Directions. The 2023 Directions set the rules for the 2020 valuation cycle, which set employer contribution rates from April 2024 and tested the cost control mechanism for the first time under its revised design. Following consultation, the government confirmed three changes to the mechanism to improve stability. From 2020 it uses a reformed scheme only design, a wider corridor of plus or minus 3% of pensionable pay, and an economic check so that a breach only results in changes if it would still have breached after accounting for long term economic assumptions.

=== Local Government Pension Scheme ===
The LGPS is a large funded defined benefit scheme administered locally in England and Wales, with separate arrangements in Scotland and Northern Ireland. It is subject to Section 13 reports by the Government Actuary on compliance, consistency, solvency and long term cost efficiency. Policy on investment and pooling is set by the UK government for England and Wales. In May 2025 the government published the Fit for the future consultation and response covering asset pooling, UK and local investment and governance. Proposals include completing pooling to agreed standards and strengthening reporting, subject to legislation and guidance.

=== Governance and administration ===
TPR’s General Code sets expectations for systems of governance, own risk assessments, data controls and effective boards. In public service schemes the governing body is the scheme manager, supported by a pension board and a scheme advisory board in line with the 2013 Act framework. Administration and communication are delivered by the responsible authorities, scheme administrators or pension communication specialists, such as Wordshop. Remedies and valuation changes are implemented through scheme regulations and Treasury Directions.

=== Current developments ===
The 2015 to 2022 remedy is being implemented across schemes with staged communications and regulation updates. The 2020 valuation cycle has concluded with results published in 2024 and is the first to apply the revised cost control mechanism. LGPS reforms on pooling and investment are moving from consultation to implementation in England and Wales, with separate oversight and valuations in Scotland and Northern Ireland. Readers should check the cited government pages for the latest status before drawing conclusions.

== Governance and regulation ==
Pensions policy is set in the UK by government. The Department for Work and Pensions leads on workplace and private pensions policy and administers the State Pension, while HM Treasury sets the framework for public service schemes and issues Treasury Directions under recent public service pensions legislation. Delivery and oversight involve several public bodies that work together under memoranda of understanding and a joint regulatory strategy.

=== Regulators and coordination ===
The Pensions Regulator (TPR) regulates trust-based occupational schemes and enforces employer duties for automatic enrolment. Its General Code of Practice consolidates expectations on governance, administration and reporting, and came into force in 2024. The Financial Conduct Authority (FCA) regulates contract-based personal and workplace pensions, firms that provide or advise on retail pension products and retirement income, and requires firms to meet the Consumer Duty outcomes for retail customers. The Prudential Regulation Authority supervises insurers’ financial soundness, coordinating with TPR where insurer solvency interacts with workplace schemes. TPR and the FCA set out how they cooperate and share information in a published memorandum of understanding and a joint strategy for the pensions and retirement income sector.

=== Governance standards for schemes ===
For trust-based schemes, TPR’s General Code brings together requirements on effective governing bodies, fit and proper persons, internal controls, data quality and continuity planning. Governing bodies must put dispute procedures in place, assess and manage risks, and report material breaches of the law to TPR using its reporting framework. For contract-based workplace pensions, FCA rules require firms to operate independent governance committees to assess value for money and disclose costs and charges to savers. Both regulators work with the Money and Pensions Service on consumer guidance and with government on cross-cutting programmes such as pensions dashboards, which have a statutory connection deadline of 31 October 2026.

=== Complaints, redress and compensation ===
Most occupational schemes must offer an internal dispute resolution procedure before complaints can be escalated. The Pensions Ombudsman investigates disputes about the administration or management of occupational and personal pension schemes and issues binding determinations, with an early resolution service to try to settle cases. For personal pensions and advice on retail products, the Financial Ombudsman Service handles complaints about FCA-regulated firms. If a regulated firm fails, the Financial Services Compensation Scheme may pay compensation, subject to the limits and rules that apply to pension providers, SIPP operators and advice firms.

=== Enforcement and reporting ===
TPR publishes its approach to compliance and enforcement for automatic enrolment and expects timely reporting of material breaches by those with a duty to report. FCA rules and the Consumer Duty set standards for retail conduct and disclosure in pensions markets. These oversight tools sit alongside scheme funding, prudential supervision of insurers and, for defined benefit schemes, the statutory safety net provided by the Pension Protection Fund, which is covered earlier in this article.

== Tax treatment ==
Tax affects how people save into pensions, how much they can contribute each year, how benefits are paid, and what happens on death. HM Treasury and HM Revenue and Customs set the rules in legislation and guidance. Contributions to most private pensions attract tax relief up to set limits, investment growth in registered schemes is not taxed, and payments taken as income are normally taxed under PAYE.

=== Contributions and tax relief ===
Individuals receive tax relief on contributions to registered pension schemes up to the lower of 100% of their relevant UK earnings or £3,600 a year if they have little or no earnings, subject to the annual allowance. There are two main ways relief is given. In relief at source arrangements the scheme adds basic rate tax relief to the member’s net payment and higher or additional rate relief is claimed from HMRC by the individual. In net pay arrangements member contributions are taken from pay before tax is calculated. Many employers use salary sacrifice to convert employee contributions into employer contributions, which can reduce Income Tax and National Insurance for the employee and employer. HMRC’s guidance sets out how salary sacrifice works for PAYE and contract changes. HMRC provides an online service to claim additional tax relief where needed.

=== Annual limits ===
The annual allowance is the most that can be saved each tax year across all schemes before an annual allowance charge may apply. In 2025 to 2026 the standard annual allowance is £60,000. For higher earners a tapered annual allowance applies. For every £2 of adjusted income above £260,000 the allowance reduces by £1, to a minimum of £10,000. If a person has flexibly accessed a defined contribution pot in a way that triggers the money purchase annual allowance, the defined contribution limit is £10,000 a year, with an alternative annual allowance applying for any defined benefit accrual.

=== Taking benefits ===
From 6 April 2024 the lifetime allowance was abolished and replaced by limits on the total tax-free lump sums that a person can receive. The lump sum allowance is usually £268,275. A separate lump sum and death benefit allowance applies to tax-free lump sums paid because of serious ill health or on death before age 75 and is usually £1,073,100. Transitional rules set out how earlier benefits affect the new allowances and allow certificates where appropriate. Within these limits, people can normally take up to 25% of their pot as a tax-free lump sum, subject to the lump sum allowance. Further withdrawals or pension income are taxed as earnings under PAYE in the year of payment.

=== Death benefits and Inheritance Tax interactions ===
If a member dies before age 75, most lump sum death benefits and inherited drawdown are usually free of Income Tax provided they remain within the deceased’s lump sum and death benefit allowance. If death is on or after age 75, payments to beneficiaries are normally taxed as their income. If a lump sum is paid more than two years after the scheme is told of the death, the payment is taxable. In July 2025 the government confirmed that from 6 April 2027 all death in service lump sums from registered schemes will be out of scope of Inheritance Tax for consistency across scheme designs. In the 2024 Autumn Budget, it was announced that unused pension funds will be within the scope of inheritance tax from 6 April 2027. Previously, pensions were out of the scope of inheritance tax.

== Statistics and indicators ==
This section gives a dated snapshot of key indicators across the UK pensions system. Figures are point-in-time and updated by the cited official sources.

Selected indicators (with dates)
Area	Latest figure and date	Source
Workplace pension participation	89% of eligible employees in Great Britain were saving into a workplace pension in 2024, around 21.7 million people. Published 31 July 2025.	DWP
DC market size and structure	DC assets were about £205 billion in 2024. Master trusts held about £166 billion and around 91% of memberships. Published March 2025.	The Pensions Regulator
Private DB funding position	Aggregate surplus of about £255.1 billion and funding ratio 129.8% in October 2025.	Pension Protection Fund
Retirement income access	961,575 pension plans were accessed for the first time in 2024 to 2025. Drawdown sales rose by 25.5% year on year and annuity sales by 7.8%. Published 16 September 2025.	Financial Conduct Authority
Funded schemes’ assets	The market value of private sector defined benefit and hybrid schemes fell by 7% to £1,103 billion between 30 September 2024 and 31 March 2025. Published 2 October 2025.	Office for National Statistics

== Current developments ==
This section summarises reforms and programmes that were live as of October 2025. It links to official sources so readers can check status changes.

=== Pension Schemes Bill 2024 to 2025 ===
The government’s Pension Schemes Bill 2024 to 2025 brings together proposals for the defined contribution market and scheme consolidation. The Commons Library briefing explains the Bill’s scope and timelines. Key strands include:

- Value for money: trustees and providers would have to disclose standard metrics on investment performance, costs and charges, and service, with actions where arrangements persistently underperform. This builds on joint FCA and TPR work and requires legislation before detailed rules follow.
- Small pots: a multiple default consolidator model would enable the transfer of deferred small defined contribution pots, with the roadmap showing a staged process through the later 2020s. The Bill provides enabling powers and a framework for selection and oversight of consolidators.
- Guided retirement options: trustees of trust based DC schemes would have a duty to develop default pension benefit solutions to help members access benefits without needing to make an active choice. CDC may play a role, subject to regulations.
- Contractual override for contract based schemes: the Bill would allow FCA regulated providers, with protections in FCA rules, to vary contract terms or transfer members to alternative arrangements without individual consent where this is in members’ interests, to support consolidation and the value for money framework.
- Scale and DC megafunds: proposals include minimum size requirements for multi employer defaults by 2030, with a transitional path for smaller providers. Details are set out in the Pensions Investment Review and reflected in the Bill materials.

=== Implementation milestones and deadlines ===
Several programmes are moving into delivery:

- Pensions dashboards: schemes and providers must connect to the central architecture by 31 October 2026. DWP has issued staged connection guidance and regulators can take enforcement action for non compliance.
- Defined benefit funding regime: TPR’s new DB funding code took effect in November 2024. In May 2025 TPR released the statement of strategy templates and guidance for valuations under the new framework.
- PPF levy 2025 to 2026: the Pension Protection Fund confirmed a zero conventional levy for 2025 to 2026, enabled by legislative changes that allow the levy to be set to zero without preventing later reintroduction if needed.

=== Local government pensions policy ===
For the funded Local Government Pension Scheme in England and Wales, the government published proposals and a response on pooling, investment and reporting in May 2025. The policy aims to complete pooling to agreed standards and to strengthen transparency and governance in the next phase, with separate arrangements in Scotland and Northern Ireland.

== Special categories of pension ==
=== Perpetual or hereditary pensions ===
Perpetual pensions were freely granted either to favourites or as a reward for political services from the time of Charles II onwards. Such pensions were very frequently attached as salaries to places which were sinecures, or, just as often, resulted in grossly overpaid posts which were really unnecessary, while the duties were discharged by a deputy at a small salary.

Prior to the reign of Queen Anne, such pensions and annuities were charged on the hereditary revenues of the sovereign and were held to be binding on the sovereign's successors. By the Taxation, etc. Act 1702 (1 Ann. c. 7) it was provided that no portion of the hereditary revenues could be charged with pensions beyond the life of the reigning sovereign. This act did not affect the hereditary revenues of Ireland and Scotland, and many persons were quartered, as they had been before the act, on the Irish and Scottish revenues who could not be provided for in England for example, the Duke of St Albans, illegitimate son of Charles II, had an Irish pension of £800 a year (equivalent to £149,720 in 2025); Catherine Sedley, mistress of James II, had an Irish pension of £5,000 a year; the Duchess of Kendal and the Countess of Darlington, respectively mistress and half-sister of George I, had pensions of the united annual value of £5,000 (equivalent to £573,989 in 2025), while Madame de Wallmoden, a mistress of George II, had a pension of £3,000 (equivalent to £506,373 in 2025).

These pensions had been granted in every conceivable form during the pleasure of the Crown, for the life of the sovereign, for terms of years, for the life of the grantee, and for several lives in being or in reversion. On the accession of George III and his surrender of the hereditary revenues in return for a fixed civil list, this civil list became the source from which the pensions were paid. The three pension lists of England, Scotland and Ireland were consolidated in 1830, and the civil pension list reduced to finance the remainder of the pensions being charged on the Consolidated Fund.

In 1887 Charles Bradlaugh MP protested strongly against the payment of perpetual pensions, and as a result a committee of the House of Commons inquired into the subject. An appendix to the report contains a detailed list of all hereditary pensions, payments and allowances in existence in 1881, with an explanation of the origin in each case and the ground of the original grant; there are also shown the pensions, etc., redeemed from time to time, and the terms upon which the redemption took place. The nature of some of these pensions may be gathered from the following examples:

- To the Duke of Marlborough and his heirs in perpetuity, £4,000 per annum; this annuity was redeemed in August 1884 for a sum of £107,780, by the creation of a ten years annuity of £12,796/17/-. per annum.
- By the Lord Nelson (Annuity) Act 1806 (46 Geo. 3. c. 146) an annuity of £5,000 per annum was conferred on Earl Nelson and his heirs in perpetuity.
- In 1793 an annuity of £2,000 was conferred on Lord Rodney and his heirs.

All these pensions were for services rendered, and although justifiable from that point of view, a preferable policy is pursued in the 20th century, by Parliament voting a lump sum, as in the cases of Lord Kitchener in 1902 (£50,000) and Lord Cromer in 1907 (£50,000).

Charles II granted the office of Receiver-General and Controller of the Seals of the Court of Kings Bench and Common Pleas to the Duke of Grafton. This was purchased in 1825 from the duke for an annuity of £843, which in turn was commuted in 1883 for a sum of £22,714/12/8. To the same duke was given the Office of the Pipe or Remembrancer of First-Fruits and Tenths of the Clergy. This office was sold by the duke in 1765 and, after passing through various hands, was purchased by one R. Harrisor in 1798. In 1835 on the loss of certain fees the holder was compensated by a perpetual pension of £62/9/8. The Duke of Grafton also possessed an annuity of £6,870 in respect of the commutator of the dues of butlerage and prisage.

To the Duke of St Albans was granted in 1684 the office of Master of the Hawks. The sum granted by the original patent were: Master of Hawks, salary £391/1/5.; four falconers at £50 per annum each, £200; provision of hawks, £600; provision of pigeons, hens and other meats £182/10/-.; total, £1373/11/5. This amount was reduced by office fees and other deductions to £965, at which amount it stood until commuted in 1891 for £18,335.

To the Duke of Richmond and his heirs was granted in 1676 a duty of one shilling per ton of all coals exported from the Tyne for consumption in England. This was redeemed in 1799 for an annuity of £19,000 (chargeable on the Consolidated Fund), which was afterwards redeemed for £633,333.

The Duke of Hamilton, as hereditary keeper of the palace of Holyrood House, received a perpetual pension of £45,105 and the descendants of the heritable usher of Scotland drew a salary of £242/10/-.

The conclusions of the committee were that pensions, allowances and payments should not in future be granted in perpetuity, on the ground that such grants should be limited to the persons actually rendering the service, and that such reward should be defrayed by the generation benefited; that offices with salaries and without duties, or with merely nominal duties, ought to be abolished; that all existing perpetual pensions and payments and all hereditary offices should be abolished: that where no service or merely nominal service is rendered by the holder of an hereditary office or the original grantee of a pension, the pension or payment should in no case continue beyond the life of the present holder and that in all cases the method of commutation ought to ensure a real and substantial saving to the nation (the existing rate, about 27 years purchase, being considered by the committee to be too high). These recommendations of the committee were adopted by the government and outstanding hereditary pensions were gradually commuted, the only ones left outstanding being those to Lord Rodney (£2,000) and to Lord Nelson (£5,000), both chargeable on the Consolidated Fund. Neither of these pensions is currently active, the Rodney Pension was commuted in 1924 for a sum of £42,000, and the Nelson Pension was ended as a result of the Trafalgar Estate Act 1947. This Act allowed for the pension to continue to be paid to the then-current recipient and his heir, and provided for payments to cease on the death of the heir.

=== Political pensions ===
These are type sui generis as they either reward a career in domestic politics or are awarded in the colonial context not on grounds of justice, contract or socio-economic merits, but as a political decision, in order to take a politically significant person (often deemed a potential political danger) out of the picture by paying him or her off, regardless of seniority.

=== Civil List pensions ===
These are pensions granted by the sovereign from the Civil List upon the recommendation of the First Lord of the Treasury. They were to be "granted to such persons only as have just claims on the royal beneficence or who by their personal services to the Crown, or by the performance of duties to the public, or by their useful discoveries in science and attainments in literature and the arts, have merited the gracious consideration of their sovereign and the gratitude of their country." As of 1911, a sum of £1,200 was allotted each year from the Civil List, in addition to the pensions already in force. In 1908, the total of civil list pensions payable in that year amounted to £24,665. For 2012–13 the total annual cost of civil list pensions paid to 53 people was £126,293. The average pension was £2,383.

=== Judicial, municipal, etc. pensions ===
There are certain offices of the executive whose pensions are regulated by particular acts of Parliament. Judges of the High Court, on completing fifteen years' services or becoming permanently incapacitated for duty, whatever their length of service, may be granted a pension equal to two-thirds of their salary (Supreme Court of Judicature Act 1873). Historically the Lord Chancellor of Great Britain, however short a time he may have held office, received a pension of half his salary. The Public Service Pensions Act 2013 (c. 25) abolished this arrangement, and subsequent Lord Chancellors have participated in the Ministerial Pension Scheme.

Local authorities contribute to pensions in the Local Government Pension Scheme using powers in the Superannuation Act 1972.

=== Ecclesiastical pensions ===
Bishops, deans, canons or incumbent who are incapacitated by age or infirmity from the discharge of their ecclesiastical duties may receive pensions which are a charged upon the revenues of the see or cure vacated.

=== Royal Navy – historical ===
Navy pensions were first instituted by William III of England in 1693 and regularly established by an order in council of Queen Anne in 1700. Since then the rate of pensions has undergone various modification and alterations; the full regulations concerning pensions to all ranks will be found in the quarterly Navy List, published by authority of the Admiralty. In addition to the ordinary pension there are also good-service pensions, Greenwich Hospital pension and pensions for wounds.

An officer was entitled to a pension when he retired at the age of 45, or if he retired between the ages c 40 and 45 at his own request, otherwise he received only half pay. The amount of his pension depended upon his rank, length of service and age. As an example, in past, the maximum retired pay of an admiral was £850 per annum, for which 30 years' service or its equivalent in half-pay time was necessary; he may, in addition, have held a good service pension of £300 per annum. The maximum retired pay of a vice-admiral with 29 years' service was £725; of rear-admirals with 27 years' service, £600 per annum. Pensions of captains who retire at the age of 55, commanders, who retire at 50, and lieutenants who retire at 45, ranged from £200 per annum for 17 years' service to £525 for 24 years' service. The pensions of other officers were calculated in the same way, according to age and length of service.

The good-service pensions consisted of ten pensions of £300 per annum for flag-officers, two of which may be held by vice-admirals and two by rear-admirals; twelve of £150 for captains; two of £200 a year and two of £150 a year for engineer officers; three of £100 a year for medical officers of the navy; six of £200 a year for general officers of the Royal Marines and two of £150 a year for colonels and lieutenant-colonels of the same. Greenwich Hospital pensions range from £150 a year for flag officers to £25 a year for warrant officers. All seamen and marines who have completed twenty-two years' service were entitled to pensions ranging from 1d a day to a maximum of 1/2 a day, according to the number of good-conduct badges, together with the good-conduct medal, possessed. Petty officers, in addition to the rates of pension allowed them as seamen, were allowed for each year's service in the capacity of superior petty officer, 15/2 a year, and in the capacity of inferior petty officer 7/7 a year.

Men who were discharged from the service on account of injuries and wounds or disability attributable to the service were pensioned with sums varying from 6d a day to 2/- a day. Pensions were also given to the widows of officers in certain circumstances and compassionate allowances made to the children of officers. In the Navy estimates for 1908–1909 the amount required for halfpay and retired-pay was £868,800, and for pensions, gratuities and compassionate allowances £1,334,600, a total of £2,203,400.

Navy pensions were updated in 1975 with the Armed Forces Pension Scheme 1975 Regulations.

=== Modern armed forces ===
Members of all three modern armed forces are members of the Armed Forces Pensions Scheme, which is a career average defined benefit pension scheme, and is described by the government as one of the most generous pensions available in the UK today. One key feature of the current scheme (dating from 2015) is that members pay no employee contribution, with the pension being entirely funded from the public purse. Each year a scheme member accumulates 1/47th of their salary, with a retirement age of 60. The annual pension payment increases each year in line with the Consumer Price Index.

== Pension provision by age group ==
The family resources survey from the UK Department for Work and Pensions, details levels of income, saving and pension provision for a representative selection of UK households and is the source for the table below for UK employees (Table 7.12):

Pension provision level	16–24 age group	25–34 age group	35–44 age group	45–54 age group	55–59 age group	60–64 age group	65+ age group	Working-age male	Working-age female	All adult employees	All self-employed adults
Occupational pension	15%	41%	51%	52%	49%	33%	2%	44%	46%	42%	1%
Personal or stakeholder pension	1%	8%	11%	11%	11%	8%	3%	12%	7%	9%	30%
Both occupational and personal pension	0	1%	2%	3%	3%	2%	0	2%	2%	2%	0
Not in any pension scheme	83%	49%	36%	34%	37%	56%	95%	42%	46%	47%	68%

Most employees over the state pension age of 65 would not have pension provision as part of their salary and benefits—they may well, however, be receiving income from a pension from previous employment.

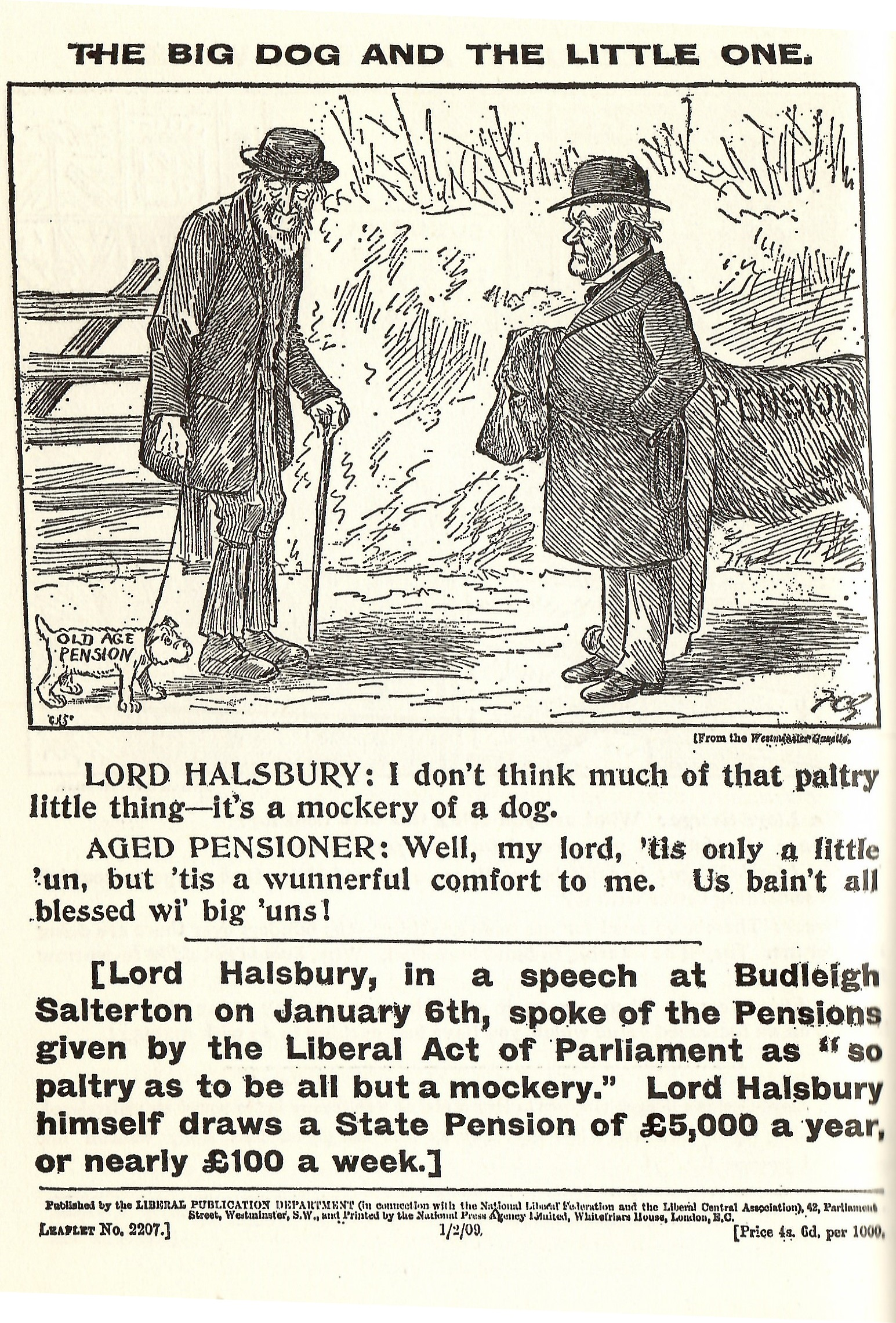
UK Liberal Party poster in 1909 defends new old age pension shown as a little dog while the rich aristocratic landlord has a huge pension (shown as a very large dog). See Old Age Pensions Act 1908

== See also ==
- History of the welfare state in the United Kingdom
- Association of Pension Lawyers
- Gender pension gap
- Pensions in Germany
- Pensions in the United States
- Ageing of Europe
- Pension tax simplification
- Minimum funding requirement
- Frozen pension
- Superannuation in Australia
- Pensions in Canada
- Personal pension scheme

State pensions acts

- Widows', Orphans' and Old Age Contributory Pensions Act 1925 (15 & 16 Geo. 5. c. 70)
- National Insurance Act 1946
- National Insurance Act 1965
- Social Security Contributions and Benefits Act 1992

Private pensions acts

- Superannuation and other Funds (Validation) Act 1992
- Pension Schemes Act 1993
- Pensions Act 1995
- Pensions Act 2004
- Pensions Act 2007
- Pensions Act 2008

Auto-enrolment solutions

- Smart Pension
- National Employment Savings Trust
- The People's Pension
