= Scottish Public Pensions Agency =

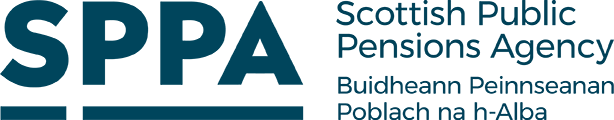

Executive agency overview
- Jurisdiction: Scotland
- Executive agency executive: Stephen Pathirana, Chief Executive
- Parent Executive agency: Scottish Government
- Website: pensions.gov.scot

The Scottish Public Pensions Agency (Scottish Gaelic: Peinnseanan Poblach na h-Alba) is an executive agency of the Scottish Government. It is responsible for the administration of government pension schemes in Scotland. This includes the pension schemes of NHS Scotland and for Scotland's teachers.

The Agency is based in Tweedbank, in the Scottish Borders.

== History ==
The Agency was formed as the Scottish Office Pension Agency on 1 April 1993. Following devolution, responsibility for the Agency transferred to the Scottish Executive, and it was renamed to its current title.

In 2001, the Agency was relocated from Edinburgh to the Scottish Borders.

== Pension schemes ==
The Agency administers the following schemes:

- National Health Service Superannuation Scheme (Scotland) for NHS Scotland employees;
- Scottish Teachers’ Superannuation Scheme for teachers employed in Scottish schools;
- Scottish Police Pensions Scheme (Scotland)
- Scottish Firefighters' Pensions Scheme

In addition, it regulates the following schemes (administration is the responsibility of local managers):

- Local Government Pension Scheme
- The Legal Aid (Scotland) Pension Scheme
- Scottish Executive Rural Affairs Department Superannuation Scheme
- Scottish Transport Group Pension Schemes
