= Public Service Pensions and Judicial Offices Act 2022 =

Act of the Parliament of the United Kingdom

Public Service Pensions and Judicial Offices Act 2022 (Note: Section 132.)
- Act of Parliament
- Parliament of the United Kingdom
- Long title: An Act to make provision about public service pension schemes, including retrospective provision to rectify unlawful discrimination in the way in which existing schemes were restricted under the Public Service Pensions Act 2013 and corresponding Northern Ireland legislation; to make provision for the establishment of new public pension schemes for members of occupational pension schemes of bodies that were brought into public ownership under the Banking (Special Provisions) Act 2008; to make provision about the remuneration and the date of retirement of holders of certain judicial offices; to make provision about judicial service after retirement; and for connected purposes.
- Citation: 2022 c. 7
- Territorial extent: England and Wales (in part); Scotland (in part); Northern Ireland (in part); (Note: Section 130.)

Dates
- Royal assent: 10 March 2022
- Commencement: 10 March 2022 (in part); 1 October 2023; (Note: Section 131.)
Other legislation
Amends	Courts-Martial (Appeals) Act 1968; Administration of Justice Act 1970; Courts Act 1971; Misuse of Drugs Act 1971; Industry Act 1975; Judicature (Northern Ireland) Act 1978; Public Passenger Vehicles Act 1981; Senior Courts Act 1981; County Courts Act 1984; Reserve Forces (Safeguard of Employment) Act 1985; Social Security Administration (Northern Ireland) Act 1992; Employment Tribunals Act 1996; Education Act 1996; Immigration and Asylum Act 1999; Constitutional Reform Act 2005; Tribunals, Courts and Enforcement Act 2007; Judiciary and Courts (Scotland) Act 2008; Tribunals (Scotland) Act 2014; Courts Reform (Scotland) Act 2014
Repeals/revokes	Judicial Pensions and Retirement Act 1993
Relates to	Public Service Pensions Act 2013; Banking (Special Provisions) Act 2008

Status: Amended

History of passage through Parliament

Text of statute as originally enacted

Revised text of statute as amended

The Public Service Pensions and Judicial Offices Act 2022 (c. 7) is an act of the Parliament of the United Kingdom that raised the retirement age for British judges from seventy back to seventy-five years.
