= The Pensions Regulator =

UK regulatory body

Agency overview
- Formed: 5 April 2005
- Preceding agency: Occupational Pensions Regulatory Authority
- Jurisdiction: United Kingdom
- Headquarters: Telecom House, 125–135 Preston Road, Brighton BN1 6AF, United Kingdom
- Agency executives: Emma Douglas, Chair; Nausicaa Delfas, Chief Executive
- Parent department: Department for Work and Pensions
- Website: thepensionsregulator.gov.uk

The Pensions Regulator (TPR) is a UK non-departmental public body responsible for regulating work-based pension schemes. It was created by the Pensions Act 2004 and replaced the Occupational Pensions Regulatory Authority (OPRA) from 6 April 2005, adopting a proactive, risk-based approach to regulation. TPR’s statutory objectives include protecting members’ benefits, reducing risks to the Pension Protection Fund (PPF), promoting good administration of schemes, and maximising employer compliance with automatic enrolment duties, while minimising any adverse impact on an employer’s sustainable growth when exercising certain functions.

== History ==
The Occupational Pensions Regulatory Authority (OPRA) was established by the Pensions Act 1995 and came into full operation on 6 April 1997, replacing the Occupational Pensions Board. The Pensions Act 2004 created The Pensions Regulator, which took over from OPRA on 6 April 2005 with wider powers and a more proactive, risk-based remit.

== Objectives and functions ==
TPR’s objectives are to:

- protect members’ benefits;
- reduce the risk of calls on the Pension Protection Fund (PPF);
- promote, and improve understanding of, good administration of work-based pension schemes;
- maximise employer compliance with automatic-enrolment duties; and
- minimise any adverse impact on the sustainable growth of an employer when exercising functions under Part 3 of the Pensions Act 2004.

In support of these objectives TPR issues codes of practice and guidance, monitors scheme governance and funding (including defined benefit scheme funding), and enforces employers’ automatic-enrolment duties.

== Organisation and leadership ==
David Norgrove was appointed TPR’s first chair in January 2005. He was succeeded by Michael O’Higgins in January 2011, and by Mark Boyle in 2014 (reappointed for a second term). Mark Boyle stepped down in March 2021 and was replaced by Sarah Smart in April 2021, initially on an interim basis. As of 2025, Kirstin Baker is interim chair.

Lesley Titcomb became chief executive in March 2015, and was succeeded by Charles Counsell in April 2019. Nausicaa Delfas later became Chief Executive.

== Enforcement and notable cases ==
Following the January 2018 collapse of Carillion, TPR faced criticism from MPs regarding the effectiveness of its oversight. A parliamentary report described TPR as “feeble”. In June 2018, TPR’s then Chair said the organisation had changed to become clearer, quicker and tougher, and confirmed it was considering a contribution notice against former Carillion directors.

TPR has used civil and criminal powers in a range of cases. In 2017 it agreed a cash settlement worth up to £363 million with Sir Philip Green in relation to the BHS pension schemes, funding a new independent scheme for members. In 2017 TPR also reached a £74 million settlement with Coats Group as part of an anti-avoidance investigation, and in 2018 secured increased deficit contributions from Southern Water.

Since its inception, TPR has reported recovering more than £1 billion for pension schemes through settlements in avoidance cases, including outcomes achieved after issuing Warning Notices or during investigations.

== Regulatory approach ==
Through its “TPR Future” programme, the regulator reviewed and updated its model to drive up standards and tackle risk by engaging more proactively with a larger proportion of schemes and employers. Its “Making workplace pensions work” guide describes this approach.

== See also ==
- List of financial supervisory authorities by country
- Pension Protection Fund
- Automatic enrolment in workplace pensions
