= António Simões (executive) =

Business executive (born 1975)

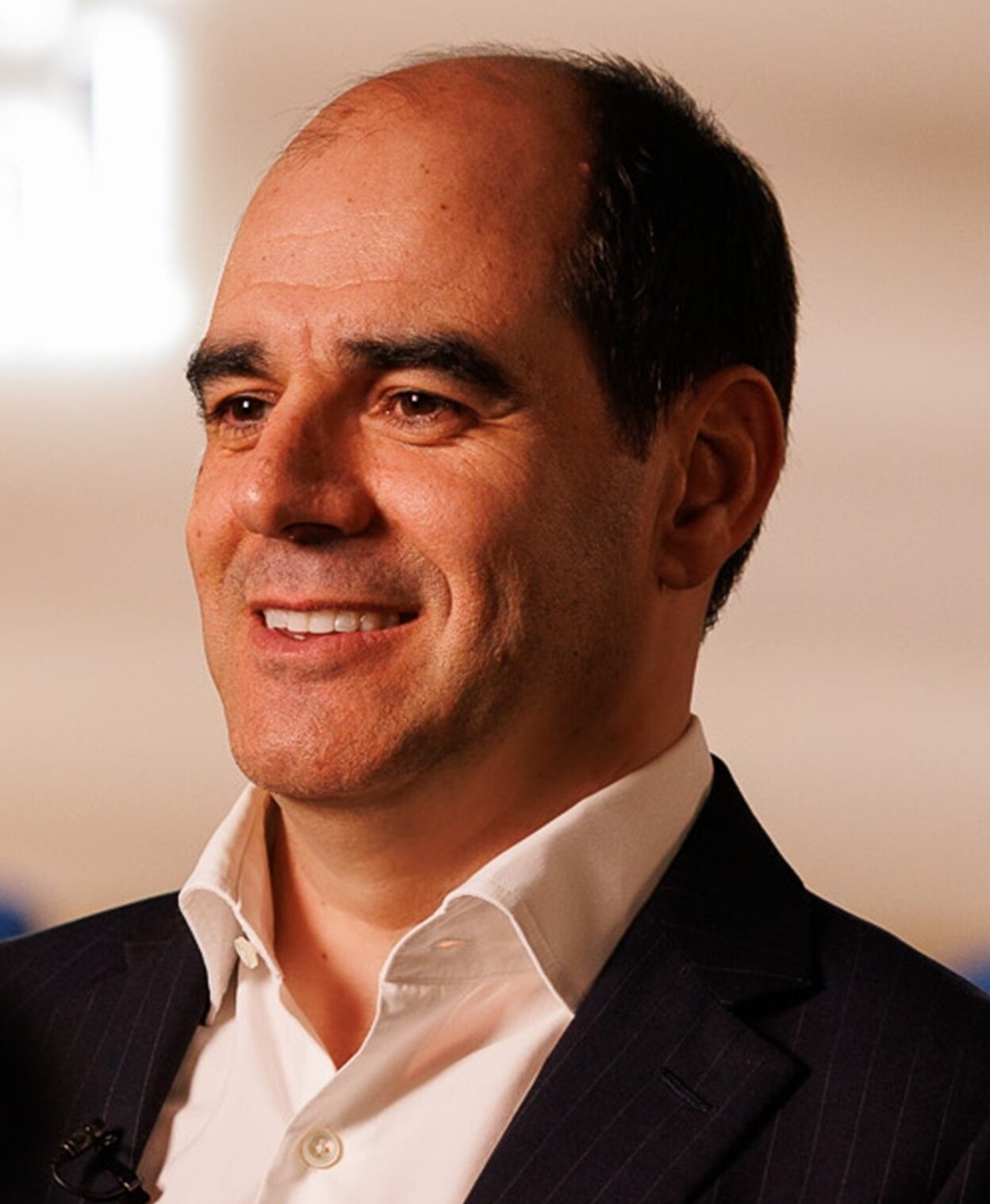
- Simões in 2025
- Born: 12 March 1975 (age 51); Portugal
- Education: Nova School of Business and Economics; Columbia University
- Occupation: Financial services executive
- Years active: 1997–present
- Employer: Legal & General
- Title: group chief executive

António Pedro dos Santos Simões (born 12 March 1975) is a financial services executive. He joined Legal & General as group chief executive in January 2024, succeeding Nigel Wilson.

He was previously regional manager of Europe at Banco Santander and had worked for HSBC for twelve years in both London and Hong Kong.

== Early life ==
Simões was born on 12 March 1975 in Portugal. He was raised in Almada where he was educated at Frei Luis de Sousa. He graduated at the top of his class from the Nova School of Business and Economics in Lisbon with a degree in economics. He later earned an MBA from Columbia Business School in New York City, which included a semester at Bocconi University in Milan.

== Career ==
=== HSBC ===
Simões joined HSBC in 2007 after working at Goldman Sachs and spending 10 years at McKinsey, where he was a partner.

On 1 November 2012, he was appointed chief executive of HSBC in the UK and deputy chief executive of HSBC Bank plc, the group's principal UK and continental European subsidiary.

On 1 September 2015, Simões was appointed the chief executive of HSBC Bank plc and chief executive of Europe.

He was made chief executive for global private banking with effect from 1 January 2019.

=== Santander ===
In 2020 he joined Banco Santander as Regional Head of Europe. He was made Chief Executive of Santander Spain in 2021, together with his existing responsibilities as Regional Head of Europe.

=== Legal & General ===
Simões took up post as group chief executive at Legal & General on 1 January 2024 and joined the board of Legal & General Group plc on appointment.

=== Other activities ===
In 2009, he was appointed a Young Global Leader of the World Economic Forum.

He is a vocal campaigner on youth unemployment issues and has been involved with the King's Trust since 2012. He became a trustee of Prince's Trust International (now the King's Trust) in 2018.

In 2012, he was invited to be a founding member of Conselho da Diáspora Portuguesa (World Portuguese Network), a group of Portuguese people living abroad advising the Portuguese presidency.

He was a member of the practitioner panel of the Financial Conduct Authority from July 2013 and was chair of the panel from August 2015 until August 2017. He joined the practitioner panel of the Prudential Regulations Authority in November 2013.

In 2015 he was on a steering committee set up to review a possible merger of some trade associations in the UK banking sector.

In April 2015, he joined the Banking Standards Board as practitioner member.

== Personal life ==
Simões is openly gay and is married to Tomas. They have two children.

He has contributed to several books, including Lord Browne's The Glass Closet and Stephen Frost's The Inclusion Imperative. In January 2015 Simões came first at the Out at Work & Telegraph Top 50 LGBT Executives list, which celebrates individuals making a difference at the workplace. OUTstanding in Business together with the Financial Times nominated him as the most inspiring LGBT senior business executive in October 2013. As part of the European Diversity Awards 2013, he was also awarded the Diversity Champion of the Year.
