= Suffolk Life =

British pensions administrator

Suffolk Life Pensions Limited
- Industry: Financial services
- Founded: 1971
- Defunct: 2019
- Fate: Acquired and merged
- Successor: Curtis Banks
- Headquarters: Ipswich, Suffolk, United Kingdom
- Key people: Will Self, Chief Executive Officer
- Products: Pensions, Self-invested personal pensions
- AUM: £10.5 billion (2018) (assets under administration AUA))
- Website: www.suffolklife.co.uk

Suffolk Life was a British pensions administrator based in Ipswich, Suffolk. It mainly provided the administration of self-invested personal pensions (SIPPs), and personal pensions for private funds and self-invested funds of third party providers. Suffolk Life was a non-advice pension provider and was well known for commercial property expertise.

The company was acquired by the Curtis Banks Group plc for £45 million from Legal & General on 25 May 2016. The brand aligned with Curtis Banks in 2018 and was completely replaced by the parent Curtis Banks brand and identity in 2019.

== History ==
Suffolk Life was established in 1971 by a group of solicitors, with the aim of allowing commercial property to be purchased using pension funds. The business was founded by Alan Catchpole, and then taken over by his son, Henry Catchpole, who held the role of managing director from 1997 until 2010.

One of the company's early focuses was SSAS (Small Self Administered Scheme) administration, however in 2006 Suffolk Life sold this book of business to Mattioli Woods, a specialist pensions consultancy, to focus on the administration of self-invested personal pensions (SIPPs). Suffolk Life's first SIPP product (The Suffolk Life SIPP), launched in 1996, was written as an insurance contract by Suffolk Life Annuities Limited, an insurance company within the Suffolk Life group.

In 2007 The Suffolk Life SIPP closed to new business. Suffolk Life launched a new product, the MasterSIPP - a self-invested personal pension allowing more flexibility concerning the self-investment of protected rights.

2010 saw the introduction of the SimSIPP - a product aimed at those investors and advisers who dealt solely with one investment manager. They then had partnerships with several investment managers.

Suffolk Life introduced the SmartSIPP in 2011 - a platform-based self-invested personal pension (SIPP) allowing access to funds within selected platforms and a stockbroker.

Suffolk Life provided third-party administration services for self-invested pensions for:

- Aviva
- Clerical Medical
- Prudential plc

Suffolk Life and Cofunds launched the Cofunds Pension Account in March 2010, a pension plan provided by Suffolk Life offering advisers and investors access to investments on the Cofunds platform.

In 2008, Suffolk Life came under ownership of the Legal & General Group.

On 21 November 2012, Suffolk Life announced they were acquiring a book of business from Pointon York, following a closure of one of Pointon York's schemes. This brought 1,700 investors to Suffolk Life's existing business. Following this in May 2013, Suffolk Life acquired Origen Investment Services and Pearson Jones Plc's SIPP books, bringing over 700 new SIPPs to Suffolk Life.

On 15 January 2016 it was announced that Curtis Banks Group plc - another SIPP provider - was to acquire Suffolk Life from Legal & General for £45 million. The acquisition completed on 25 May 2016.

Subsequently, Suffolk Life acquired SIPP provider EPML (European Pensions Management Limited) from special administration on 15 July 2016.

Suffolk Life ceased as an active brand at the beginning of 2019, rebranded as Curtis Banks Pensions.
