= AJ Bell =

British stockbroker

AJ Bell plc

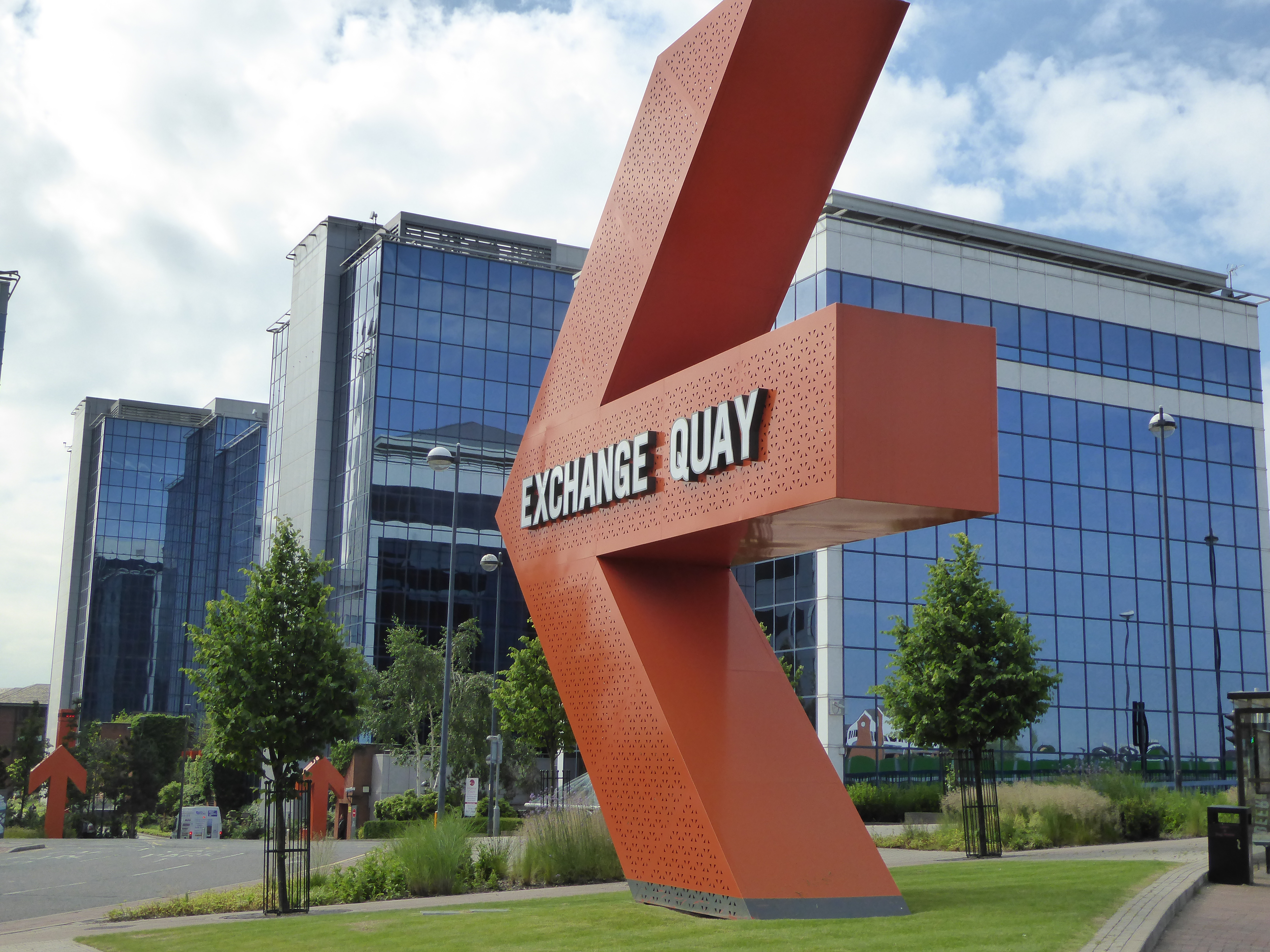
- AJ Bell's headquarters at Salford Quays
- Formerly: A J Bell Holdings Limited (2002–2013); AJ Bell Holdings Limited (2013–2018); AJ Bell Limited (14–16 Nov 2018)
- Type: Public limited company
- Traded as: LSE: AJB; FTSE 250 component
- Industry: Financial services
- Founded: 1995 in Manchester, United Kingdom
- Founder: Andrew James Bell; Nicholas Littlefair
- Headquarters: Salford, United Kingdom, M5 3EE
- Key people: Fiona Clutterbuck (Chairman); Michael Summersgill (Chief Executive)
- Products: SIPP; ISA; SSAS
- Brands: AJ Bell; AJ Bell Investcentre; AJ Bell Dodl; AJ Bell Touch; AJ Bell Platinum; AJ Bell Securities; AJ Bell Media
- Revenue: ▲£317.8 million (2025)
- Operating income: ▲£132.0 million (2025)
- Net income: ▲£105.1 million (2025)
- AUM: ▲£8.9 billion (2025)
- Total assets: ▲£303.1 million (2025)
- Total equity: ▲£217.5 million (2025)
- Number of employees: ▲1,505 (2025)
- Website: ajbell.co.uk

AJ Bell plc is a British public limited company that provides online investment platforms and stockbroker services. It is listed on the London Stock Exchange and is a constituent of the FTSE 250 Index.

== History ==
The company was formed in Manchester by Andrew (Andy) James Bell and Nicholas Littlefair in 1995. The company was the subject of an initial public offering valuing the business at £675 million in November 2018.

== Operations ==
Its main platform business operates under four core brands:

- AJ Bell is a direct-to-customer platform, offering a low-cost SIPP, ISA and Dealing (Trading) Account.
- AJ Bell Investcentre offers an SIPP, ISA and general investment account (GIA) and is only available to customers via Financial Conduct Authority (FCA) authorised financial advisers.
- AJ Bell Platinum is a bespoke SIPP and SSAS provider offering customers a bespoke (custom) service.
- AJ Bell Securities is the company's stockbroking arm.

The company also provides third party SIPP administration services, and owns a specialist financial publishing business in London known as AJ Bell Media. AJ Bell was recognised as a Which? Recommended Provider for each of the seven years, 2019, 2020, 2021, 2022, 2023, 2024 and 2025.

Since 2026, AJ Bell has also offered Lombard lending – allowing customers to borrow against their shares or investment portfolios – through the AJ Bell Investcentre offering for financial advisers. This is powered by Firenze, the UK Lombard lending platform.
