= Private pension =

Type of pension plan

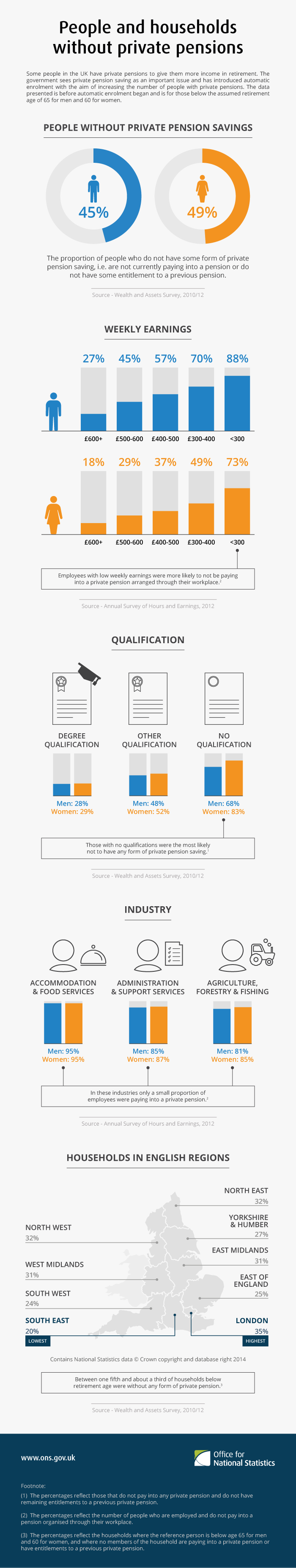
People and households without private pensions

A private pension is a plan into which individuals privately contribute from their earnings, which then will pay them a pension after retirement. It is an alternative to the state pension. Usually, individuals invest funds into saving schemes or mutual funds, run by insurance companies. Often private pensions are also run by the employer and are called occupational pensions. The contributions into private pension schemes are usually tax-deductible.

== History ==
The first evidence of pension payments comes from the Roman Empire in the 1st century BC, but beginnings of private pensions go back to the 19th century. The first private pension plan in the USA was created in 1875 by the American Express Co. But the growth of people covered by private pensions was relatively slow. In 1950, only 25 percent of employees in nonagricultural field were anticipated in some private pension system.

=== Situation in the 21st century ===
At the start of the 2000s, governments of developed countries reduced the amount of money for providing pension security. As a consequence, employer-sponsored and individual products become more popular. Most of these private pension types invest in the financial markets, which brings some risks and uncertainty. For example, it can be the time difference between the date of conclusion of the contract and income stream in the future or very low rate of return if the pension manager decided to invest into low-risk savings products. Usually, a three-pillar pension system is introduced. The first pillar is related to state pensions, the second one to supplementary pensions, and the third one to voluntary individual (private) pensions.

== By country ==
=== In the USA ===
One of the most used private pensions is defined contribution plan. Each participant has his or her own individual account. Contributions are made to this account by an employer of a participant as a part of his or her wage. Each participant chooses some mutual funds, stocks, or other securities to invest this amount of money. The return of this investment is continuously credited or deducted from an individual's account. Money in this plan cannot be withdrawn without penalty until the participant's retirement age.

Another possibility in the USA is Defined Benefit Plan. This plan pays some amount of money at the time of retirement regardless of the age of a participant. A monthly benefit depends on the number of years worked, salary at the time of retirement, and accrual rate. A defined Benefit Plan can be funded or unfunded. In a funded plan, the special fund for investing contributions of employers and participants is created. The return of investment is changeable, so there are not any guarantees of some level of future income. In an unfunded plan, there are no funds for paying benefits. The benefits to be paid are met by contributions to the plan or by some assets.

=== In the UK ===
In the UK, there are two main possibilities how to ensure additional money to the State Pension. With workplace pensions, the plan of savings for retirement is arranged by an employer. Part of your salary is automatically paid into the pension scheme every payday.

The second possibility of private retirement savings is the use of a personal pension (also called "Private Pensions"). This type of pension is arranged by the insured themselves. There are two types of personal pensions – the stakeholder pension where is required to meet some government limits and self-invested personal pensions where participants make decisions themselves about investment in their pension fund.

The Pensions Act 2012, and amended in 2014, requires all employers to automatically enroll their workers into a Workplace Pension Scheme with the option to opt-out and re-enroll.

Both types of private pensions share similar features. The amount of money the participants get in retirement depends on how much they have paid in, how long they have had the private pension, their health condition, and how well the pension fund's investments have done. Moreover, tax relief is provided to private pension participants.

=== In Germany ===
In Germany, there are three types of private pension plans that are recognized by the German government – Riester Rente, Rürup Rente and the Private Altersvorsorge. They all follow the strategy of the German government to reduce state-guaranteed pensions. These plans are offered by insurance firms and are subject to approval by the German Pension Authority. Only approved pension plans qualify for the beneficial tax treatment.

Germany's pension plans are hybrid defined-benefit plans with a minimum guaranteed outcome and a market-based outcome that depends on the performance of the underlying investments. These plans are flexible in investment strategy as long as they meet the expectations set by the government to receive beneficial tax treatment. All plans have tax-exemption from capital gains tax and dividend income tax during the accumulation phase of the plan.

Riester Rente is designated for low-income earners and families who pay German income and wage taxes, employees who contribute to Public Retirement Insurance, civil servants, and more. It is necessary to contribute at least 60 euros per year to get government subsidies. In order to gain maximal government support, the participant is required to paid at least 4% of his/her annual income. It is possible to save at most 2,100 euros per year. The amount of government subsidies is between 154 euros and 300 euros depending on fulfilling some conditions. This plan is regulated by the German Government. The participant has to be at least 60 years old to draw money back. All money you contribute to the pension system is guaranteed. Due to this guarantee the Riester Rente is restricted to invest in secure, low-return investments.

Rürup Rente, named after Bert Rürup, is primarily designated for people with high tax burden, but everyone can take part in. There are no government subsidies. However, income tax relief is provided on contributions to this plan, in addition to the tax relief is connected with this plan. Rürup Rente provides a lifelong pension which is guaranteed. The pension payment cannot start before reaching the age of 62.

Private Altersvorsorge is designated for everybody that prefers flexibility payout. It has less tax-advantages in return for minimal government restrictions. It must be held at least 12 years and be paid out after the age of 62 in order to claim the tax benefits on the payout. Flexible plans can be paid out as a lump-sum (all at once) or as a lifelong income. The funds in the contract can also be inherited. The money can be withdrawn anytime before the age of 62 but will incur full capital gains taxation if done so.

=== In France ===
There are two occupational mandatory supplementary plans – ARRCO (Association des régimes de retraites complémentaires) for executive workers and AGIRC (Association genérale des institutions de retraite des cadres) for non-executive workers where employees and employers have to contribute. If the participant do not contribute all the time, their pension rates are lower. The benefits can be paid out from the age of 60, usually as annuities.

Next, there are two voluntary pensions schemes – Funded occupational pension plan – PERCO (Plan d’épargne retraite) and Individual retirement savings plan - PERP (Plan d’épargne retraite populaire).

In PERCO, employers have to offer several investment funds to employees with different portfolios. Employees can save at most one quarter of their gross annual salary. For employers, it is compulsory to contribute, but the minimum amount is not established. The maximum amount saved in a year horizon is 5,149 euros in total of employer's and employee's contributions. It is not possible use the money before retirement. Contributions made by employees subject to income tax, but return of investment and retirement benefits not.

PERP is form of individual pension contributions which provides additional income in a retirement. The conditions of frequency and amount depend on pension insurance plan. Insurer is obliged to guarantee progressive increase of minimal level of benefits. Usually, benefits are paid out as annuities, but lump sum is also possible. Participating in PERP has also a tax benefit, because amount of money deposit to this scheme is tax-deductible up to 10% of your last year income.
