= Nigel Wilson =

Nigel Wilson may refer to:

- Nigel Wilson (baseball) (born 1970), Canadian baseball player
- Nigel Wilson (businessman) (born 1956), British businessman
- Nigel Wilson (classicist) (born 1935), British scholar of classics
