= Retirement annuity plan =

Retirement annuity plan is a financial product that ensures regular income to retirees in later years. A 'Retirement annuity plan (RAP) is a type of retirement plan similar to IRA that provides a stream of regular (single) distributions to an insured retiree. Time intervals between distributions as well as their amount are defined by conditions and type of the annuity between issuer organization and client. Nowadays many types of retirement annuities are offered on the market.

== Accumulation & Distribution Phase ==
=== Accumulation Phase ===
The Accumulation Phase of a retirement plan is a period of an individual's life in which they are working and are able to save money for retirement. The accumulation phase begins when an individual starts to save money for retirement and ends when they start to receive distributions.

When individuals decide to buy an annuity they agree to pay a lump upfront or to make regular deposits to the insurance institution. The money individuals pay to the insurance companies is then reinvested into the market. Money grows until the day when an individual decides to retire.

=== Distribution (Payback) Phase ===
The payback phase starts as soon as distributions are paid to the insured individuals. There are different ways how insurance organizations can distribute payments. Payments could be distributed for a predetermined period of time (e. g. 15 years) annually, semi-annually, etc.; as well as in the form of a life annuity or a single payment. Payments could be paid immediately after the retirement of an individual or after some period of time.

== Types of Retirement Annuities and their differences ==
=== Fixed vs. Variable Retirement Annuity ===
Individuals that enter into a fixed annuity have the opportunity to decide ahead of time how much they will receive when the distribution phase begins. A Fixed annuity enables fixing the rate of return for a predefined number of distribution periods or for life. Generally, fixed annuities are conservative insurance products as the rate of return is approximately equal to the rate of return that certificate of deposit (CD) would offer.

Variable annuities operate in other ways. The final value of distributions that would accumulate from investments an individual had made during the accumulation phase is directly dependent on the performance of the investment options that would be chosen by the client. Individuals typically use mutual funds that invest in market instruments, bonds, and (or) stocks.

=== Deferred Retirement Annuity ===
Payments on it begin after a certain period of time. This period can vary widely (from one year to several decades). A deferred annuity is often used to organize pension payments - the accumulation phase in it can last until a certain age of the annuitant.

=== Immediate Retirement Annuity ===
An immediate retirement annuity is an annuity that is purchased in a single lump sum, and payments on it begin immediately (30 days to 12 months), after the entry into force of the contract (there is no accumulation phase). An immediate retirement annuity is good for turning a large amount of money into a source of permanent income. It is not widely used as there is no accumulation phase, but it is suitable for rich people that would like to retire and purchase a passive source of income.

== Benefits and Downsides of a Retirement Annuity ==
=== Benefits ===
A purchase of a retirement annuity could help individuals to shift the financial risks of retirement to the insurance company. With fixed retirement annuities insured retirees will receive the fixed amounts of money no matter how the financial markets are moving.

Another great benefit of an annuity is that it is not taxed until the payout phase. The annuitant is responsible to pay the taxes on the distribution, but generally on the income earned on top of the original investment.

This insurance product is very flexible and there are many types of annuity plans that can suit almost anyone according to their own preferences.

=== Downsides ===
One of the main downsides of retirement annuity is costs. Comparing to other financial instruments such as investing in mutual funds and certificates of deposit. As retirement annuities are often sold by intermediaries the cost of commission is shifted to a buyer.

Very often individuals who closed deferred retirement annuities will have to pay a surrender fee if they unexpectedly will withdraw funds during the early years of the contract. However, most annuities allow for emergency purposes a penalty-free withdrawal, which varies from 10% to 15% of the account.

== Examples with calculations ==
=== Example 1 (Fixed deferred retirement annuity) ===
Calculate a lump sum payment that an individual should pay to the insurance organization, in order to in 20 years receive monthly distributions in the amount of $500 for 5 years, assuming a constant annual rate of return 12%.

Calculation of a monthly nominal ROR...r

$r = {j \over m} = {0.12 \over 12} = 0.01 = 1\%$; where j...constant annual ROR, m...number of months

$_{240|}a_{\overline{60}|1\%} = 500 \cdot v^{240}\cdot a_{\overline{60}|1\%} = 500 \cdot {\left (\frac{1}{1.01}\right )^{240}} \cdot \left ( \frac{1-{\left (\frac{1}{1.01}\right )}^{60}}{0.01} \right ) = 2063.46\$$; where $_{240|}a_{\overline{60}|1\%}$...lump sum payment, $v = \frac{1}{1+r}$...discount factor,

$a_{\overline{n}|r} = \frac{1-v^n}{r}$...the present value of $1 annuity immediate.

=== Example 2 (Variable immediate retirement annuity) ===
Calculate a lump sum payment that and individual should pay to insurance organisation, in order to for the next 20 years receive annual variable distributions. The first distribution of $30.000 in the first year is decreasing each next year by $1.000. Assume constant annual rate of return 5%.

$$\begin{align}
PV
& = {30 000} \cdot v + {29 000} \cdot v^2 + \cdots + {11 000} \cdot v^{20} \\
& = {31 000} (v+v^2+ \cdots +v^{20})- {1000} \cdot (v + 2v^2 + \cdots + 20v^{20}) \\
& = {31 000} \cdot a_{\overline{20}|r} - 1000 \cdot (ra)_{\overline{20}|r} \\
& = {31000} \cdot \frac{1- v^{20}}{r} - {1000} \cdot \frac {(1+r)\cdot a_{\overline{20}|r}- 20 \cdot v^{20}}{r} \\
& = {31000} \cdot \frac {1-{\left (\frac{1}{1.05}\right )}^{20}}{0.05} - 1000 \cdot \frac{(1+r) \cdot a_{\overline{20}|r}-20 \cdot {\left (\frac{1}{1.05}\right )}^{20} }{r} \\
& = {31000} \cdot {12.462210} - 1000 \frac {1.05 \cdot {12.462210} - 20{\left (\frac{1}{1.05}\right )}^{20}}{0.05} \\
& = 31000 \cdot 12.462210 + 1000 \cdot 110.950616 \\
& = 386328.51 + 110950.616 \\
& = 497279.126
\end{align}$$

where $30000 \cdot v = 31000 \cdot v - 1000 \cdot v= (310000 - 1000) \cdot v = 30000 \cdot v$ and $29000 \cdot v^2 = 31000 \cdot v^2 - 1000 \cdot 2v^2 = (310000 - 1000 \cdot 2)\cdot v^2 = 29000 \cdot v^2$ etc.

== History ==
The plans were introduced under section 226 of the Income and Corporation Taxes Act 1970 and are often referred to as section 226 contracts. However they are currently legislated under section 620 of the Income and Corporation Taxes Act 1988 and are therefore also known as section 620 contracts.

== Tax treatment ==
Part of the lump sum must be used to buy an annuity and part can be taken a tax-free lump sum. Contributions receive basic tax relief claimed at source (although this was only introduced in 2001). The income and gains in the plan are free from tax (with the exception of the non-reclaimable 10% tax credit). At maturity, the tax-free cash can be taken. The tax-free cash lump sum is calculated with reference to the initial annual income. The formula is often described as: the tax-free cash is equal to three times the residual income.

This tax regime was abolished under pension simplification introduced on 6 April 2006.

== See also ==
- Annuities
- Personal pension schemes
- Annuity (American)
- Pension plans
- Retirement plans in the United States
