= Curtis Banks =

British financial services company

Curtis Banks Group PLC
- Type: Public limited company
- Founded: 2009; 17 years ago
- Founder: Rupert Curtis; Chris Banks
- Key people: Jane Ridgley (COO); Dan Cowland (CFO)
- Revenue: ▲GBP£63.3 million (2021); GBP£53.9 million (2020)
- Owner: Nucleus Financial (2023–present)
- Number of employees: ▲600
- Website: curtisbanks.co.uk

Curtis Banks is a financial services company based in Bristol, United Kingdom.

Founded in 2009, it is one of the UK's largest independent providers of Self Invested Personal Pension schemes (SIPP) and Small Self Administered Pension Schemes (SSAS) with over £37.4bn of assets under administration. The company holds offices in Bristol, Dundee, and Ipswich.

Since its inception, Curtis Banks is said to have shown "a willingness to take over existing SIPPs", first by acquiring Montpelier Pension Administration Services for £399,999 in May 2011 and then the full SIPP business from Alliance Trust Savings for £7m in January 2013. After the ATS deal, it set up an office in Dundee's City House with around 40 members of staff brought over from Alliance Trust.

In January 2019, it launched its new 'Your Future SIPP', a fully digital product replacing its historical SIPP offerings. On 23 July 2020, Curtis announced agreements to acquire the SIPP and SSAS operator Talbot and Muir for a total consideration of up to £25.25m, and financial technology provider Dunstan Thomas for a total consideration of up to £27.5m.

On 26 September 2023 Nucleus Financial Platforms completed the acquisition of Curtis Banks.
