= Cala Homes =

British housebuilding company

CALA Group (Holdings) Limited
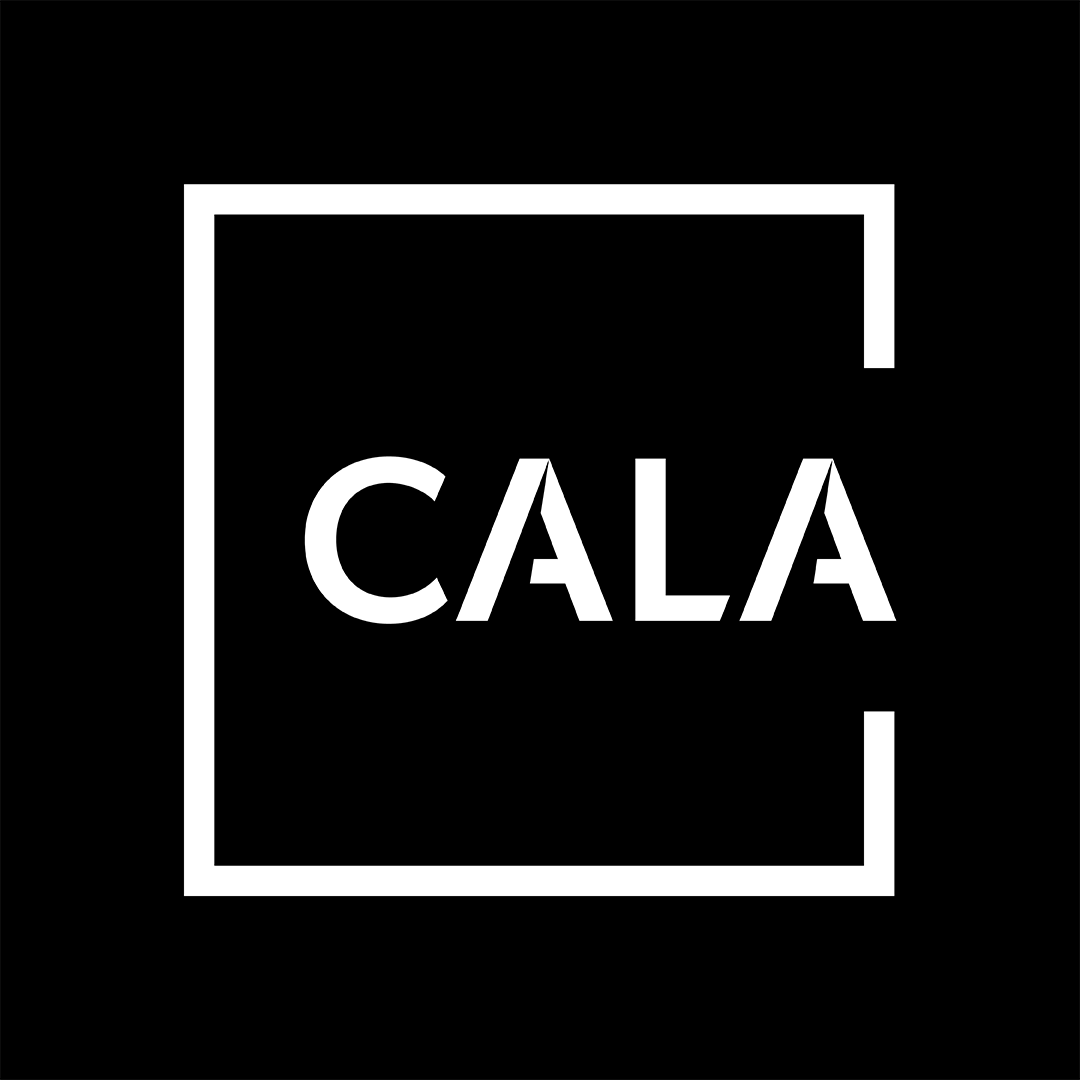
- Industry: Housebuilding
- Founded: 1875
- Headquarters: Edinburgh, Scotland, UK
- Area served: United Kingdom
- Key people: Kevin Whitaker (CEO)
- Revenue: £1,255 million (2023)
- Net income: £81 million (2023)
- Number of employees: 1,300+ (2023)
- Parent: Sixth Street Partners; Patron Capital
- Subsidiaries: Banner Homes; Taylor Lane Timber Frame
- Website: www.cala.co.uk

CALA Group (Holdings) Limited is a British housebuilding company headquartered in Edinburgh, Scotland.

It has grown to become one of the largest housebuilders in the UK. In the year to 31 December 2023, Cala Group sold 2,917 homes, had a turnover of £1.3 billion and reported a pre-tax profit of £112 million. It employed over 1,300 people across 10 offices.

== History ==
Cala was originally established as the City of Aberdeen Land Association in 1875.

In early 1997, a long-running legal action pertaining to copyright between Cala and rival construction company Alfred McAlpine concluded in an out-of-court settlement under which Cala received £1.85 million. That same year, the firm invested into multiple new sites across the West Midlands. During February 1998, Cala acquired the Yorkshire-based housebuilder Victor Homes.

During April 1999, rival house builder Miller Homes launched a bid to acquire Cala, seeking to create Britain's largest privately owned house builder, offering 175p per share; around the same time, a group of senior staff at Cala proposed a management buy-out of 165p per share instead. A bidding war broke out over Cala's ownership, during which Miller increased its offer.

In November 2000, following rival house builder Stewart Milne's withdrawal from a waterfront housing scheme in Edinburgh, Cala stepped in. One year later, the company was reorganised.

Cala was negatively impacted by the 2008 financial crisis, compelling it to lay off staff and intervening to deal with mortgages for eligible customers amid a slowdown of the housing market. During 2010, the firm undertook a judicial review of the British government's decision to abolish regional housebuilding targets; while initially successful, further efforts by Cala to prevent local councils from considering their abolition were ruled against.

Between 1999 and 2013, the Bank of Scotland held a majority stake in the company. During January 2012, Cala's leadership publicly stated that the long-term future of the firm's ownership was open to various options, including its takeover by a private equity company or a floatation on the London Stock Exchange; that same year, the firm claimed to have highest average selling price of any of Britain's listed house builders. In March 2013, Legal & General (L&G) and Patron Capital each took a 46.5% stake in Cala.

Shortly after the purchase, Cala announced plans to expand the business' land bank and to produce 1,000 homes per year. In late 2013, the firm established a new office in Aberdeen to better capitalise on the lucrative opportunities offered by Scottish oil and gas market. During early 2014, Cala opened two new offices in southern England. In October 2014, the firm acquired rival housebuilder Banner Homes in exchange for £200 million. Partially as a result of the acquisition, Cala was reportedly set to achieve a three-fold increase in its turnover by 2016.

During March 2018, L&G acquired full control of Cala from Patron Capital via a £315 million transaction. In 2022, Cala recorded the sale of 3,000 homes; it also employed 1,300 staff at this time.

In May 2023, Cala acquired 100% of Taylor Lane Timber Frame, one of the UK’s leading timber frame construction specialists.

In March 2024, L&G was reported to be looking to sell Cala; accordingly, Rothschild & Co was appointed to handle the sale. In September 2024, Cala was sold to investment firms Patron Capital and Sixth Street Partners in exchange for £1.35 billion.
