= Generator Hostels =

Hotel chain based in Europe

- Type: Hostel chain
- Industry: Hospitality
- Founded: 1995
- Founder: Louise Duffy; Kingsley Duffy
- Headquarters: London, United Kingdom
- Number of locations: 15 (2020)
- Area served: Europe, United States
- Owner: Brookfield
- Website: www.staygenerator.com

Generator Hostels is a chain of hostels headquartered in London, United Kingdom. As of 2020 the company operates 16 hostels in Europe and the United States, including properties in Dublin, London, Copenhagen, Hamburg, Berlin (three hostels), Venice, Barcelona, Paris, Madrid, Stockholm, Rome, Amsterdam, Miami and Washington.

== History ==
Generator hostels was established in 1995 as a single property in London by siblings Louise and Kingsley Duffy.

In 2002, the company expanded for the first time, opening a location in Berlin. In 2007, the two properties were acquired by Patron Capital, beginning a new chapter for the company. International travel expert Fredrik Korallus was hired as CEO alongside Anwar Mekhayech, the creative director.

In 2011, Generator began what would be the expansion into multiple locations over the next few years, opening locations in Copenhagen and Dublin. A year later, a second location in Berlin opened, along with locations in Venice, Barcelona, and Hamburg.

Generator Paris opened in February 2015, followed by Generator Amsterdam in March 2016 and Stockholm in June of the same year. At that time, Patron continued to own a majority stake in the company. In September, Generator acquired most of the units in the Atlantic Princess Condominium in Miami Beach; in preparation for the planned opening of a hostel there in 2017.

== Locations ==
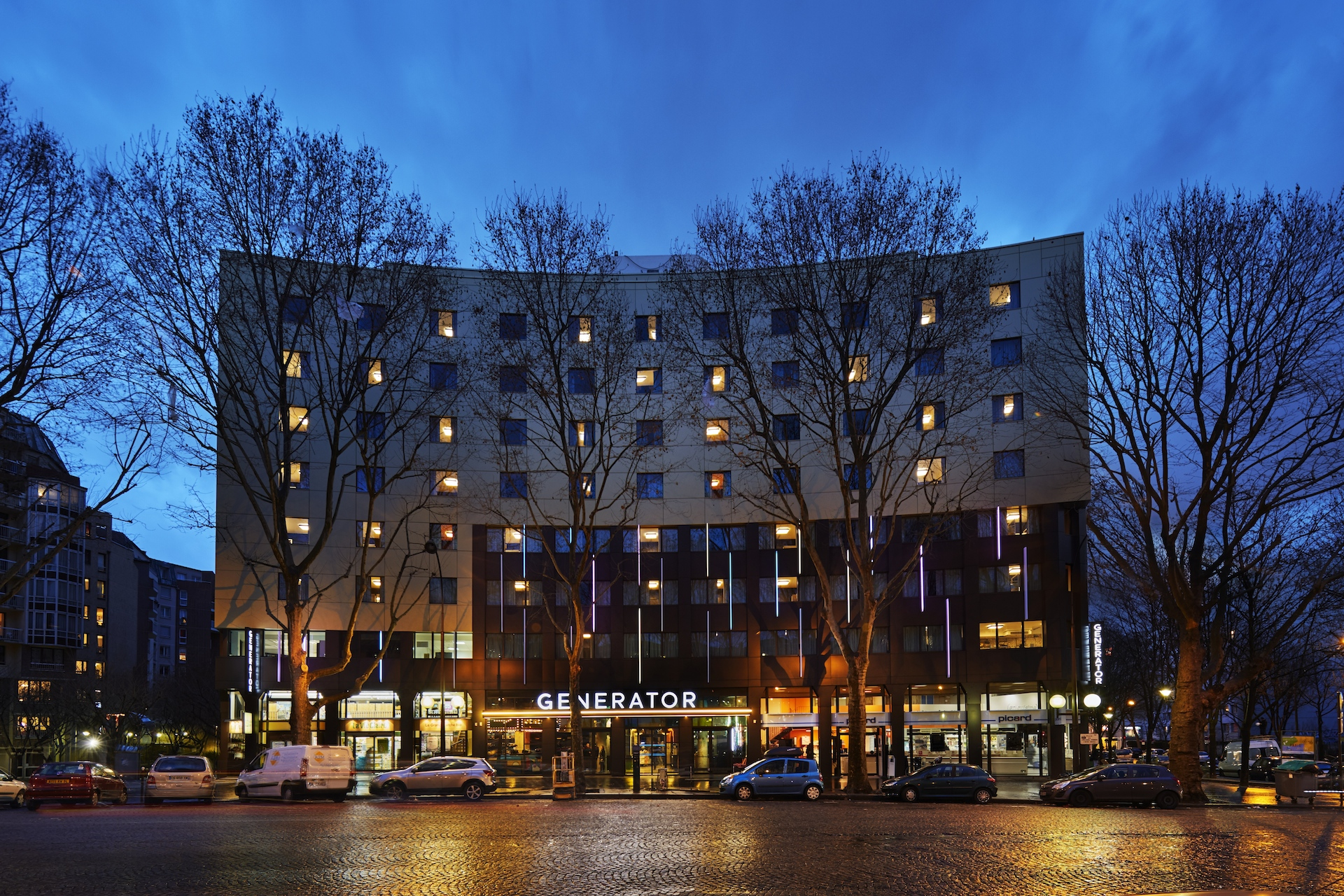
Generator Paris

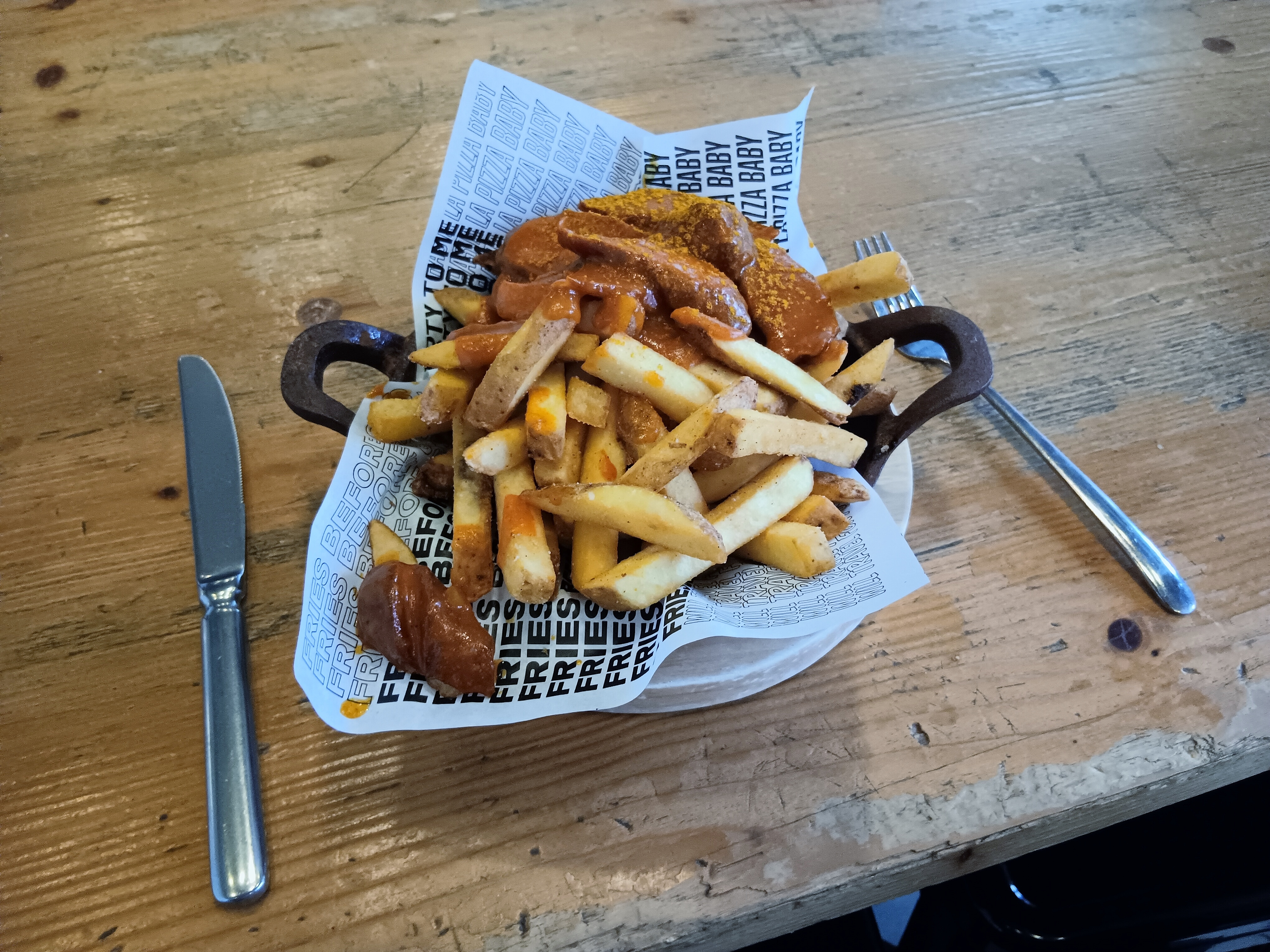
Currywurst served at Generator Berlin Mitte

List of Generator Hostels as of March 2023.

Name	Country	Opened
London	United Kingdom	1995
Berlin - Prenzlauer Berg	Germany	2002
Copenhagen	Denmark	2011
Dublin	Ireland	2011
Hamburg	Germany	2012
Venice	Italy	2012
Barcelona	Spain	2012
Berlin - Mitte	Germany	2012
Paris	France	2015
Amsterdam	Netherlands	2016
Rome	Italy	2016
Stockholm	Sweden	2016
Miami	United States	2018
Madrid	Spain	2018
Washington, D.C.	United States	2020
Berlin - Alexanderplatz	Germany	2023
