= Cambridge & Counties Bank =

Cambridge & Counties Bank Limited
- Formerly: Cambridge & Counties Limited (March–June 2012); Cambridge and Counties Bank Limited (June–July 2012)
- Type: Bank
- Founded: June 2012 in Cambridge, UK
- Headquarters: Leicester, England, UK
- Area served: UK
- Key people: Donald Kerr (CEO); Simon Moore (Chairman); Andrea Hodgson (CFO)
- Products: Property Finance; Asset Finance; Classic; Vintage; Sports Car Finance; Business Savings
- Website: ccbank.co.uk

Cambridge & Counties Bank Limited is a bank based and operating in the United Kingdom specialising in property finance, asset finance, classic, vintage, sports car finance and savings accounts for small to medium enterprises (SMEs) and credit unions.

The head office is located in the city of Leicester and the bank offers nationwide coverage through satellite offices. Cambridge & Counties Bank launched in June 2012 across Great Britain and has a unique ownership structure, being owned 50% by Trinity Hall, a Cambridge University college, and 50% by Cambridgeshire Local Government Pension Scheme.

Cambridge & Counties Bank is registered under Company Registration No: 07972522. The bank is authorised by the Prudential Regulation Authority and regulated by the Financial Conduct Authority and Prudential Regulation Authority and can be found under the Financial Services Register No: 579415.

== Services ==
Cambridge & Counties Bank specialise in property finance for experienced property investors. The property finance product range includes commercial investments, residential investments, bridging finance, secured pension lending, holiday lets, mixed-use and refurbishment loans.

The asset finance product range includes hire purchase and finance lease, and the bank is a member of the Finance and Leasing Association.

The classic car finance product range includes purchase finance, equity release and auction finance and is available for classic cars, vintage cars, modern classics and racing cars.

The bank operates a more traditional manual underwriting process where individual underwriters make decisions on each lending application, essentially combining a modern first class personal service with traditional banking values and processes.

The savings account range typically includes notice savings accounts and fixed rate bonds that are available to a varied range of organisations such as businesses, charities, clubs & associations and trusts.

== History ==
The bank originated from an idea and the hard work of Paul ffolkes Davies, the Bursar of Trinity Hall College, Cambridge and Nick Dawe the CFO of Cambridgeshire County Council and its pension fund. It was at the time a unique collaboration. At launch, Cambridge & Counties Bank offered secured loans to SMEs for business mortgages and commercial property investment. Five months after launch, residential property investment lending was added to the portfolio.

On its first anniversary, the bank announced that it had made loans totalling £40m and had signed up its 1,000th new customer. Shortly afterwards the bank confirmed it had achieved break even on a monthly trading basis. By the end of 2013 the business bank had lent more than £113m, with more than 250 loans.

In October 2014, Mike Kirsopp was appointed as Chief Executive Officer for the bank, which was followed by the opening of a Bristol-based regional office covering the South West and Wales regions of the UK. A Sheffield-based regional office was also opened in 2014 covering the North and Scotland regions.

In March 2015, Cambridge & Counties Bank announced pre-tax profits of £2.5m for the 2014 calendar year after a £99k loss in the calendar year 2013. They also announced the staff levels were at 65 with a customer satisfaction rate of 99% at the end of 2014.

Cambridge & Counties Bank entered the asset finance market in May 2015, with three product offerings including hire purchase, finance lease and chattel mortgage. The official launch was in 2016, which also saw the asset finance division win the New Challenger of the Year award at the Leasing World Awards.

In March 2016, the bank announced its 2015 results reporting a £10.2 pre-tax profit. Staff numbers increased by 45% from 65 in 2014 to 94 in 2015 and the 99% customer satisfaction rating was maintained. The Birmingham-based regional office opened in March 2016 and also in that year, Simon Moore took over the role of Chairman from Paul ffolkes Davis who had conducted the role since the inception of the bank in 2012. The annual results for the 2016 calendar year were published in March 2017 at which the bank announced a 77% increase in their year on year pre-tax profits, with their 2016 profits at £18.1m. Along with this staff numbers rose to 121 and customer satisfaction was maintained at 99% for the third year running, with 99% of new customers happy to recommend the bank.

In July 2017, Andrea Hodgson was appointed to the Board as Chief Financial Officer. Simon Lindley, who joined the bank in 2012 as a Business Development Manager, moved from his position as Commercial Director to Chief Development Officer completing the suite of five executives on the board.

In 2018, the bank signed the ‘Enable Guarantee’ with the British Business Bank and announced its 2017 results reporting a pre-tax profit of £24.4m. The Bank also hosted a showcase of the Lancelot Ribeiro exhibition that was held at New Walk Museum. 2018 saw the Bank add the Classic, Vintage, Sports Car Finance product to their portfolio, expanding their specialist offering.

2019 saw the Bank announce a balance sheet of over £1bn, become a patron of the National Association of Commercial Finance Brokers (NACFB) and expand into Scotland with the appointment of an Area Director for the region. In March 2019, they announced a pre-tax profit of £27.9m.

2020 saw the departure of two board members; Chief Executive Officer, Mike Kirsopp and Chief Customer Officer, Rachel Curtis-Bowen. Mike Kirsopp was replaced by Donald Kerr in December 2020, and Tina Hayton-Banks joined as Chief Operating Officer in November 2020.

In 2021, Paul ffolkes Davis stepped down as Vice-Chairman to the Board and Tim Harvey Samuel joined the Board as a shareholder representative for Trinity Hall. David Holton was appointed to the position of Chief Transformation Officer with a lead on a wide range of key projects for the bank with a view to further developing its competitive position in the market. The bank was also awarded a Carbon Neutral Plus status for the 2019/2020 period by Carbon Footprint Ltd. In September 2021, Cambridge & Counties Bank hit £1 billion in customer deposits.
