= XP Inc. =

Brazilian financial services company

- Type: Public company
- Traded as: Nasdaq: XP; Russell 1000 component; B3: XPBR31
- Industry: Financial services
- Founded: May 2001; 25 years ago
- Founder: Guilherme Benchimol; Marcelo Maisonnave
- Headquarters: São Paulo, Brazil
- Key people: Guilherme Benchimol (Chairman); Thiago Maffra (CEO); Lisandro Lopez (CMO); Marino Aguiar (CTO); Lucas Rabechini (CPO); Gabriel Leal (CHRO); Flavio Mota (CDO)
- Number of employees: 3,000+
- Subsidiaries: XP Investimentos; Clear; Rico
- Website: www.xpinc.com

XP Inc. is a Brazilian investment management company. The company offers fixed income, equities, investment funds, and private pension products, as well as offers wealth management and other financial services. XP serves customers in Brazil and has offices in São Paulo, Rio de Janeiro, New York, Miami, London and Geneva.

== History ==
In 2001, Guilherme Benchimol and Marcelo Maisonnave created XP Investimentos CCTVM S.A., in Porto Alegre, as a company of independent investment agents.

In 2005, XP Resource Management, a resource management company, was created. With the incorporation of Americainvest CCTVM Ltda. In 2007, XP Investimentos became a broker. Currently, the company has more than 3 million active customers and more than $130 billion in custody. It operates in several countries, mainly in Brazil and the United States. It has over 8,000 investment advisors spread across 800 offices.

In 2011, XP announced the acquisition of Interfloat and Senso Corretora. In addition, in October 2011, the company also formalized the purchase of Infomoney.

In 2012, XP announced the joining of forces with Prime Corretora.

In July 2014, it announced the purchase of Clear Corretora for $90 million.

In December 2016, XP Investimentos announced that it had acquired the Rico Corretora de Valores.

In November 2022, Aston Martin F1 Team announced a partnership with XP as the team's official global financial services partner at the 2022 São Paulo Grand Prix.

In 2026, XP reported total client assets of R$1.529 trillion, 4.790 million active clients and 18.3 thousand advisors connected to its platform.
