= Staybridge Suites =

Hotel chain

Staybridge Suites by IHG
- Type: Subsidiary
- Industry: Hotel
- Founded: 1997
- Number of locations: 220 hotels, 114 under development
- Area served: United States, Canada, Mexico, Europe, Middle East
- Parent: IHG Hotels & Resorts
- Website: ihg.com

Staybridge Suites by IHG is an all-suite, residential-style brand of hotels owned by IHG Hotels & Resorts. The hotels are primarily targeted toward extended-stay and corporate travelers. Over 220 Staybridge Suites hotels are in the United States, Canada, Mexico, Europe and South America.

== History ==
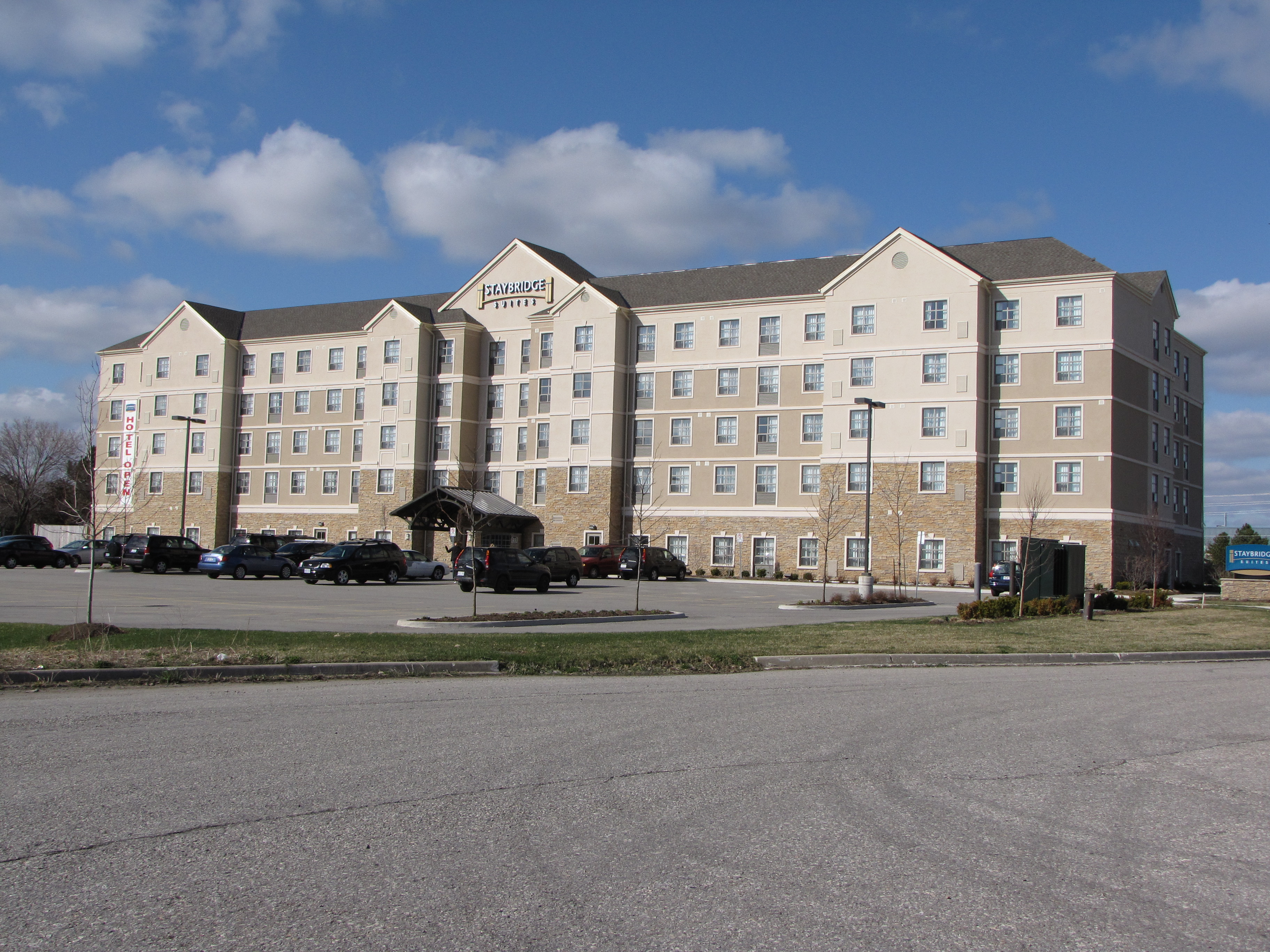
Staybridge Suites in Guelph

The first Staybridge Suites opened in Alpharetta, Georgia, U.S. in 1998. In 2004, Staybridge Suites reached 75 hotels with the addition of a location in Eatontown, New Jersey. When the Staybridge Suites Liverpool hotel (owned by Cycas Hospitality) opened in June 2008 it became the brand's first property outside North America and the first of the franchise's properties to debut in Europe.
