= David Prosser =

David Prosser may refer to:

- David Prosser Jr. (1942–2024), American jurist, member of the Wisconsin State Supreme Court
- David Prosser (bishop) (1868–1950), Archbishop of Wales
- David Prosser (financier) (1944–2020), British financier
- Dai Prosser (David Prosser, 1912–1973), Welsh rugby player
