= Nucleus Financial =

British investment platform and pension administration company

Nucleus Financial Platforms Limited
- Industry: Financial services
- Founded: 2006
- Founders: David Ferguson
- Headquarters: Salisbury, England
- Area served: United Kingdom
- Key people: Richard Rowney (CEO)
- Subsidiaries: Curtis Banks; James Hay; Talbot and Muir; Third Financial; Dunstan Thomas
- Website: nucleusfinancial.com

Nucleus Financial Platforms Limited is a British investment platform and pension administration company based in Salisbury, Wiltshire. It provides wrap platform services to financial advisers, as well as self-invested personal pensions (SIPPs), small self-administered schemes (SSASs) and commercial property administration.

The current group was formed after James Hay Partnership, owned by the private equity firm Epiris, bought Nucleus Financial Group plc in 2021.

== History ==
=== As James Hay ===
Nucleus Financial was founded as James Hay in 1979 and incorporated in 1990 before becoming part of Abbey National in 1994. James Hay became the largest provider of SIPPs in the UK during 2001 following a dramatic period of growth in the demand for these flexible pension products. James Hay performed the trustee administration for a number of insurance companies who offer SIPPs to their customers who are often introduced via IFAs (Independent Financial Advisers).

=== Early years ===
Nucleus was set up in 2006 by David Ferguson together with seven financial advice firms. Its wrap platform was designed with input from advisers and competed with the platforms run by life insurance companies. Nucleus Financial Group plc listed on the Alternative Investment Market in 2018.

In 2019 Epiris bought a majority share in the company.

=== Acquisition by James Hay ===
In 2021, James Hay made a cash offer of about £145 million for Nucleus Financial Group. The deal completed in September 2021. The combined business chose to keep the Nucleus name and phase out the James Hay brand, and Nucleus Financial Platforms Limited became the group's parent company. Richard Rowney, who had been chief executive of James Hay, became chief executive of the group.

In 2023, Nucleus completed its £242 million purchase of Curtis Banks, another SIPP provider. The deal also brought in Talbot and Muir, a SIPP and SSAS provider that Curtis Banks had bought in 2020. In 2024, Nucleus bought Third Financial, which provides platform technology to wealth managers.

=== Platform migration ===
In February 2026, Nucleus moved around £29 billion of James Hay client assets onto its main platform, which is run on technology from FNZ. FNZ also holds a minority stake in Nucleus. After the move, Nucleus Financial Services Limited took over from James Hay Administration Company as the regulated operator of the group's retail platform products. Curtis Banks and Talbot and Muir are also expected to move onto the Nucleus platform.
