= Legal & General =

British multinational financial services company

Legal & General Group plc
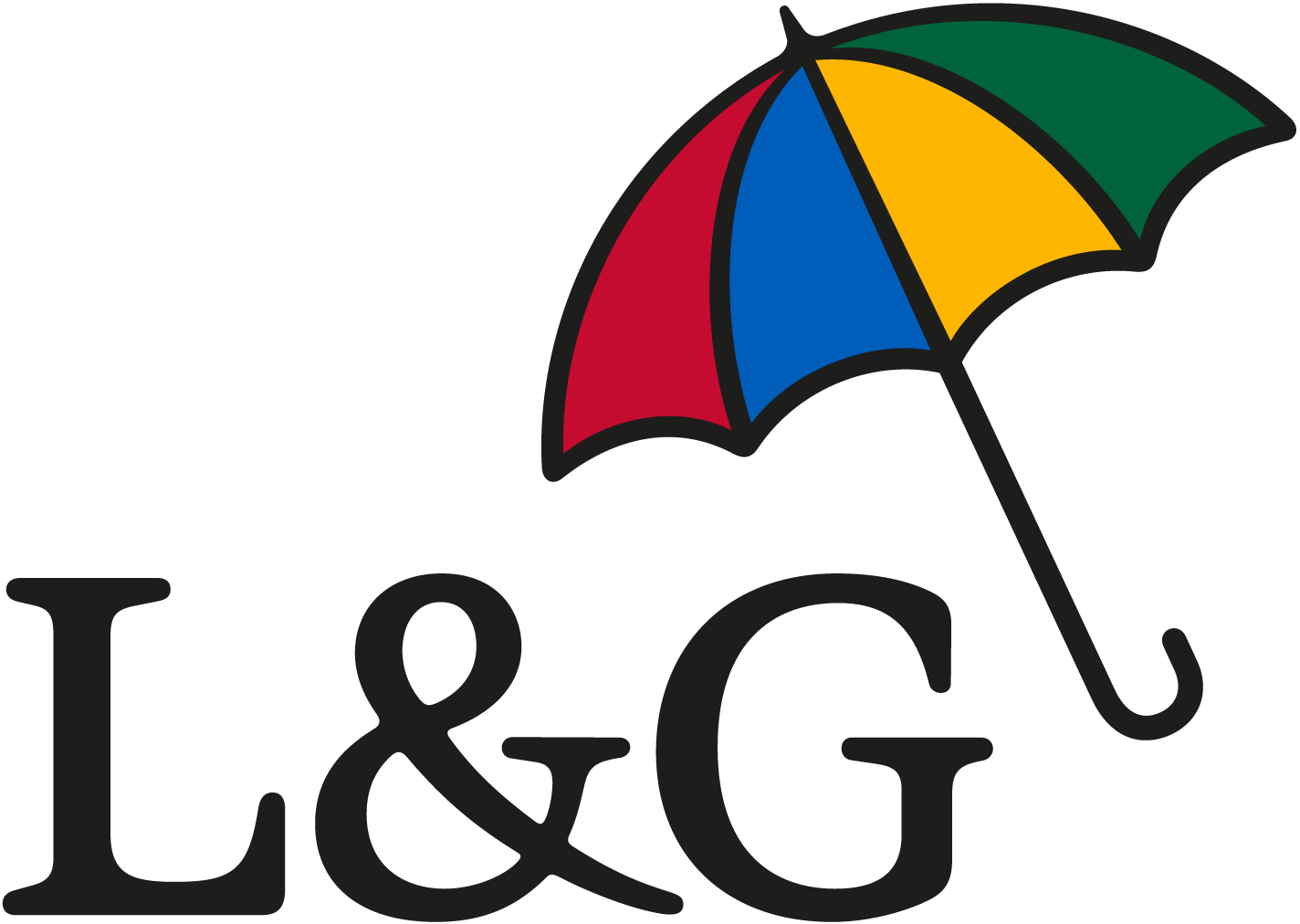

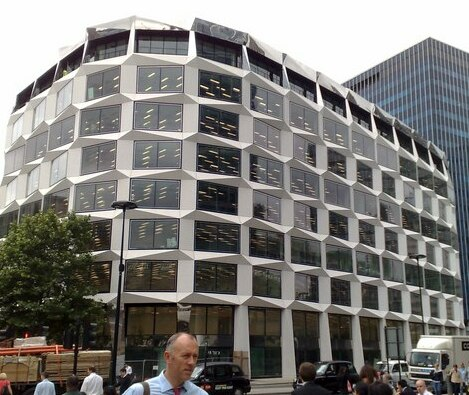
- Headquarters at One Coleman Street, London.
- Type: Public limited company
- Traded as: LSE: LGEN; FTSE 100 Component
- Industry: Financial services Asset management
- Founded: 1836; 190 years ago
- Headquarters: London, England, UK
- Key people: Scott Wheway (chairman); António Simões (CEO)
- Products: Investments, Lifetime Mortgages, Pensions, Annuities, Life Insurance
- Revenue: ▲£9.222 billion (2025)
- Operating income: ▲£0.824 billion (2025)
- Net income: ▲£0.616 billion (2025)
- AUM: ▲£1,197.0 billion (2025)
- Total assets: ▲£582.268 billion (2054)
- Total equity: ▼£2.312 billion (2025)
- Website: group.legalandgeneral.com/en

Legal & General Group plc, commonly known as Legal & General or L&G, is a British multinational financial services and asset management company headquartered in London, England. Its products and services include investment management, lifetime mortgages (a form of equity release), pensions, annuities, and life insurance. As of January 2020, it no longer provides general insurance following the sale of Legal & General Insurance to Allianz, a portfolio that primarily included home insurance and a small number of pet insurance policies.

Legal & General is listed on the London Stock Exchange and is a constituent of the FTSE 100 Index. Legal & General's Asset Management business is ranked as the 18th largest asset manager globally and the largest in the United Kingdom, by assets under management (AUM). It is also the second largest institutional investment management firm in Europe (after BlackRock).

== History ==
=== 1836 to 2000 ===
Legal and General Life Assurance Society's Act 1878
- Act of Parliament
- Parliament of the United Kingdom
- Long title: An Act to enable the Legal and General Life Assurance Society to sue and be sued in the name of a public officer, and to make provision as to the vesting of the funds and property of the Society in the trustees from time to time of the Societyl and for other purposes.
- Citation: 41 & 42 Vict. c. xxiii

Dates
- Royal assent: 16 April 1878
Other legislation
Repealed by	Legal and General Assurance Society Limited Act 1922

Status: Repealed

Text of statute as originally enacted

Legal and General Life Assurance Society's Act 1895
- Act of Parliament
- Parliament of the United Kingdom
- Long title: An Act to extend the objects of the Legal and General Life Assurance Society and for other purposes.
- Citation: 58 & 59 Vict. c. x

Dates
- Royal assent: 14 May 1895
Other legislation
Repealed by	Legal and General Assurance Society's Act 1919

Status: Repealed

Text of statute as originally enacted

Legal and General Assurance Society's Act 1919
- Act of Parliament
- Parliament of the United Kingdom
- Long title: An Act to change the name and extend the objects of the Legal and General Life Assurance Society and for other purposes.
- Citation: 9 & 10 Geo. 5. c. xx

Dates
- Royal assent: 22 July 1919
Other legislation
Repealed by	Legal and General Assurance Society Limited Act 1922

Status: Repealed

Legal and General Assurance Society Limited Act 1922
- Act of Parliament
- Parliament of the United Kingdom
- Long title: An Act to provide for the substitution of a memorandum and articles of association for the existing constitution and regulations of the Legal and General Assurance Society Limited and to repeal the Legal and General Life Assurance Society's Act 1878 and the Legal and General Assurance Society's Act 1919 and for other purposes.
- Citation: 12 & 13 Geo. 5. c. xvii

Dates
- Royal assent: 31 May 1922

Text of statute as originally enacted

Legal & General was formed by Sergeant John Adams and five other lawyers in June 1836 in a Chancery Lane coffee shop. Originally called the New Law Life Assurance Society, the society was restricted to those in the legal profession. The name was changed to Legal & General Life Assurance Society to reflect that policies were available to the general public but with share ownership restricted to those in the legal profession. The group expanded in the UK and soon began to acquire overseas life insurance companies, purchasing a pensions business from the Metropolitan Life Assurance Company of New York in the 1930s.

The society became a wholly owned division of Legal & General Group plc in the 1970s. Legal & General Group, formed Legal & General America as a holding company in 1981, and bought Government Employees Life Insurance Company (GELICO) and its NY affiliate. The GELICO name changed to Banner in 1983. William Penn was purchased by Legal & General Group Plc as a wholly owned subsidiary of Banner Life Insurance Company in 1989. It bought the Dutch branch of Unlike Assurance Group and also set up business in France during the 1980s.

Following the trend in the United Kingdom at the time of financial institutions entering the estate agency sector, Legal & General purchased Whitegates Estate Agency from Provident Financial Group plc for £19 million in December 1989.

The former Legal & General logo

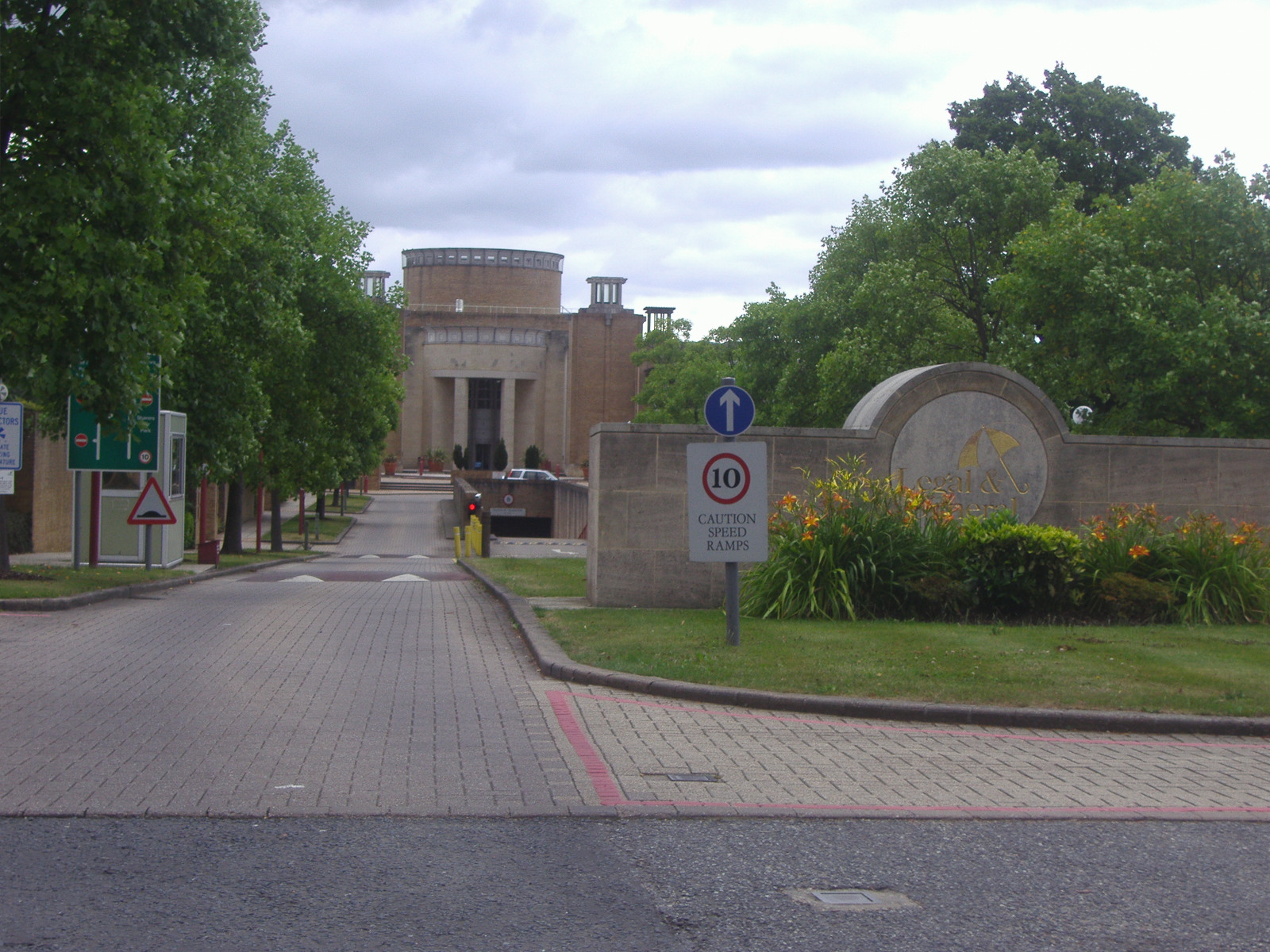
Entrance to Legal & General's former offices, Furze Hill, Kingswood

In the 1940s the main office of Legal & General was moved from Temple Bar House in the City of London to a remodelled former girls' school in leafy Kingswood, Surrey, save for some top management functions which remained in London. The girls' school (St. Monica's), which formed the basis for the site, was attended by the novelist Vera Brittain, mother of the politician Shirley Williams. The Kingswood site, which included sports fields, a park, a large and luxurious swimming pool, a canteen and a simulacrum of an English pub, among other facilities, was expanded in the 1950s and again in the 1980s. In 2015, it was announced that the headquarters would close "potentially before 2025". In fact, after a period of uncertainty for the staff at Kingswood, it was announced that the site would shut much earlier, in 2018.

The previous Legal & General logo incorporates the image of the Temple Bar (which is still used in the logo of the company's social and athletic committee), and the founding date. The umbrella logo used today was introduced by former Chief Press Officer Gordon Macdonald in June 1984. Between 1991 and 1994, Legal and General sponsored the Regional Weather Forecasts for the ITV network and in 1999, Legal & General announced plans, which never came to fruition, to merge its business with National Westminster Bank to form the first 'bancassurance' company in the UK.

=== 2000 to present ===
The company sold the Legal & General Bank and Legal & General Mortgage Services to Northern Rock in 2003 and sold its stake in Gresham Insurance, its joint venture with Barclays Bank, to Barclays in 2005.

In 2008 Legal & General bought Suffolk Life, a provider of Self Invested Pension products, sold Suffolk Life in 2016 and also outsourced its IT development areas to TCS (Tata Consultancy Services). The company formed a joint venture with two Indian public sector banks, Bank of Baroda and Andhra Bank to launch IndiaFirst Life Insurance Company in India in 2009 and outsourced some IT areas to IBM in October 2010. In 2013 the company bought Lucida Life, a pensions buyout company, for £151 million.

In 2014, there was a "shock" announcement that Legal & General was leaving as one of the Association of British Insurers (ABI)'s around 300 corporate members, due to ABI's "decision to transfer its investment business to the Investment Management Association." In the same year, the group disposed of its estate agency business, Xperience, which comprised 89 offices and 75 franchisees, trading as CJ Hole, Ellis and Co, Parkers and Whitegates, to Martin & Co for £6 million.

Legal & General took a 46.5% stake in housebuilder Cala Homes in March 2013, taking full control of the company five years later. In parallel, in 2015, Legal & General launched a modular homes operation, L&G Modular Homes, opening a factory in Sherburn-in-Elmet, near Selby in Yorkshire. Production was halted in May 2023, with L&G blaming planning delays and the COVID-19 pandemic for its failure to grow its sales pipeline; 450 factory workers faced being made redundant. By the time it had closed, the enterprise incurred total losses over seven years of £295m - a figure revised upwards to £359m in September 2024. In March 2024, Legal & General began to exit the housing market, appointing Rothschild & Co to handle the sale of Cala Homes, valued at around £750m. In 2022, Cala had sold 3,000 homes and employed 1,300 staff. In May 2024, Persimmon, Taylor Wimpey and Avant Homes were considering bids, but in September 2024, Cala Homes was sold to its previous owner Patron Capital and investment firm Sixth Street Partners for £1.35bn.

In 2014, the company formed Legal & General Reinsurance, a Bermudian-based reinsurance company. Legal & General Re completed its maiden external transaction in the Dutch market in cooperation with ASR in December 2015. In May 2016 Legal & General Assurance in the UK bought the £3 billion UK annuity portfolio of Aegon.

Legal & General Affordable Homes was established by Legal & General in 2018 and, in the same year, was registered as a for-profit registered provider of social housing, enabling it to own and manage regulated homes for social rent, affordable rent and shared ownership. Its first homes became operational in 2019 and it has since identified as one of the fastest growing For-Profit Registered Providers.

In 2019 following earlier speculation, the company agreed the sale of its General Insurance division, Legal & General Insurance, to Allianz Insurance, the latter making a simultaneous purchase of the remaining 51% share of Liverpool Victoria General Insurance (LV=) of which it already owned 49%. The acquisition took effect on 1 January 2020, at which time Legal & General Insurance's holding company was renamed Fairmead Insurance. The existing policies will be merged into Allianz Insurance's subsidiary LV= under one expanded business. Legal & General's Birmingham office became an LV= site.

Also in 2019, the company acquired a 13% investment in the electric vehicle charging point operator, Pod Point.

In 2023, the company assumed full liability for the entire pension scheme of Boots through a buy-in arrangement.

In 2024, Legal & General merged its asset management subsidiary, Legal & General Investment Management (LGIM), with its alternative assets unit, Legal & General Capital, to form a unified Asset Management business.

In February 2025, Legal & General announced the sale of its U.S. general insurance subsidiary to Meiji Yasuda for 2.3 billion dollars.

Scott Wheway was appointed chairman in October 2025.

== Operations ==
The company offers a wide range of products in addition to its direct sales service and brokerage agreements with numerous tied agents and independent financial advisers.

== Senior management ==
In the 1970s and early 1980s, Ron Peet (1925–2020), a socially-conscious actuary, was CEO of Legal & General, having previously headed its Australian operation. Peet helped the campaign for Thalidomide children, Legal & General then owning a large bloc of shares (3.5 million) in Scottish drinks and pharmaceutical company Distillers.

Sir David Prosser (1944–2020) was the CEO from 1991 to 2005 and is credited with overseeing a period of significant growth in the business. He was followed by Tim Breedon, who became CEO in January 2006. After that Sir Nigel Wilson (the previous CFO) became group chief executive on 30 June 2012, and was succeeded by António Simões in 2023.

== Arms ==
Coat of arms of Legal & General

Notes
19 February 1937
Crest
On a wreath of the colours a dragon rampant Vert the wings Argent edged and ribbed of the first charged with a cross Gules supporting a fasces in bend Proper.
Escutcheon
Azure a representation of Temple Bar Proper on a point in base Or a rose Gules barbed and seeded also Proper.
Motto
Pro Salute
