= Powerleague =

British operator of 5-a-side football centres

Powerleague is an operator of small-sided football centres, with 44 sites across the United Kingdom, Ireland, and the Netherlands. The company is headquartered in Fitzrovia, London. It also manages amateur sports leagues across the UK through its league operations arm, formerly known as Powerplay, which now operates under the Powerleague brand. These leagues span over 350 locations and include football and netball competitions.

Powerleague has developed a proprietary artificial playing surface known as Powerpitch, and introduced an updated version, Powerpitchplus, in 2023.

== Powerleague venues ==
Powerleague operates 44 small-sided football centres across the United Kingdom, Republic of Ireland, and the Netherlands.

=== United Kingdom ===
England – Greater London

- Barnet
- Battersea
- Camden
- Croydon
- Enfield
- Finchley
- Mill Hill
- Shepherd's Bush
- Shoreditch
- Tottenham
- Vauxhall
- Watford

England – Greater Manchester

- Manchester Central
- Ardwick
- Academy
- Audenshaw
- Chorlton
- Didsbury
- Eccles
- Nicholls
- South (William Hulme’s)
- Stockport
- Velodrome

England – Other Regions

- Birmingham
- Bolton
- Colchester
- Coventry
- Leeds Central
- Luton
- Romford
- Slough

Scotland

- Glasgow
- Paisley
- Edinburgh – Portobello
- Edinburgh – Sighthill

=== International ===
Republic of Ireland

- Dublin

Netherlands

- Amsterdam
- Rotterdam

== Origins ==
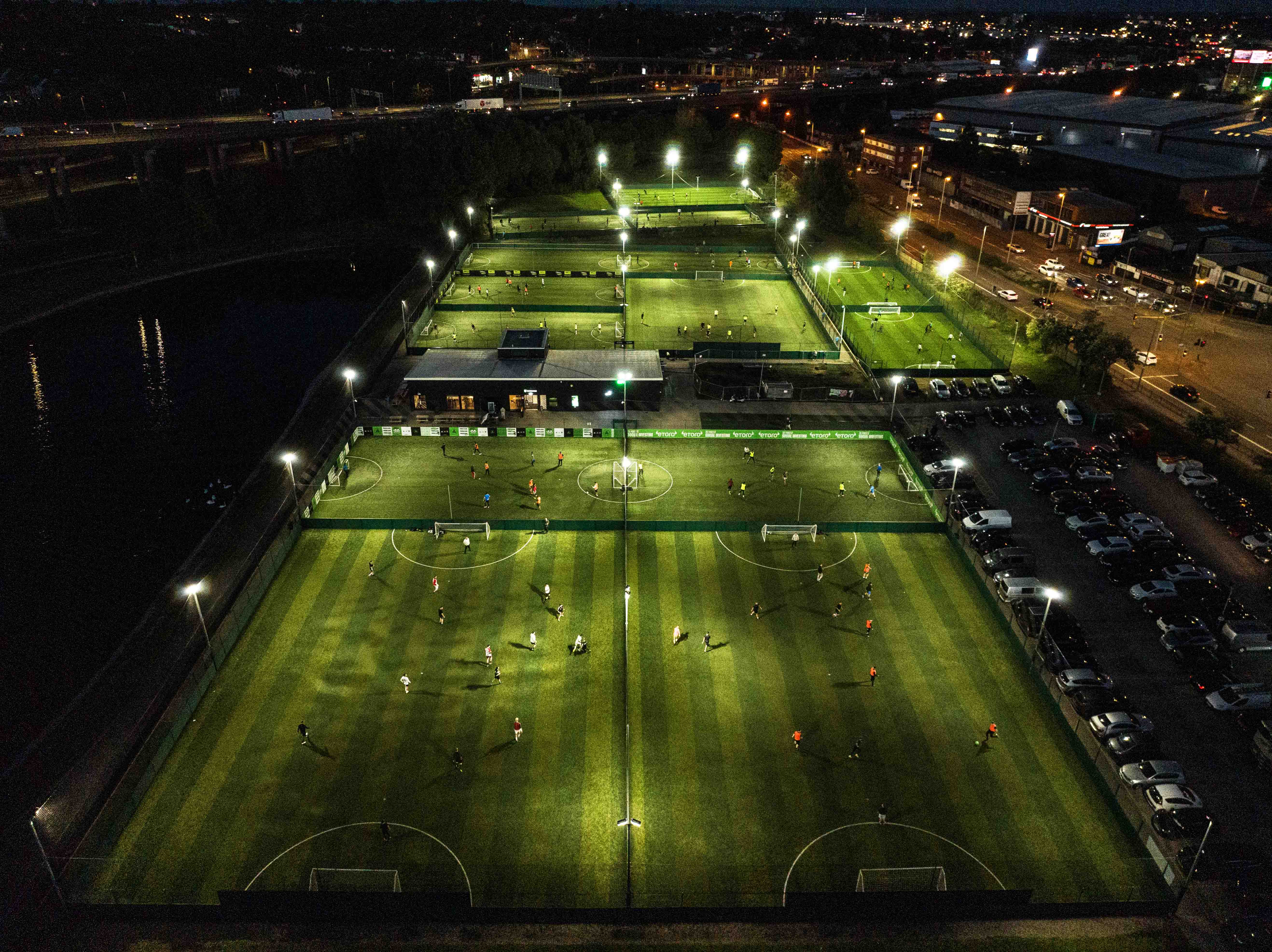
Powerleague Birmingham (drone view)

In 1987, Keith Rogers opened what is considered the world’s first commercial 5-a-side football centre in Paisley, under the brand name Pitz. Rogers expanded the business to 11 centres before it was acquired by private equity firm 3i, which subsequently rebranded the operation as Powerleague.

== Recent history ==
In 2002, after a period of decline, 3i invited Claude Littner, then Chief Executive of Tottenham Hotspur F.C., to take over executive leadership. A year later, Littner led a management buyout, leaving 3i with a minority stake. After listing on the Alternative Investment Market, Powerleague acquired the Soccerdome centres from JJB Sports in 2008. The company was subsequently acquired by Patron Capital in December 2009.

2018–present

In 2018, Patron Capital appointed a new executive team, including CEO Christian Rose, CFO Mike Evans, and John Gillespie, who has since become Chief Commercial and Customer Officer. Since then, the company has undertaken infrastructure upgrades across its centres, including pitch resurfacing, clubhouse renovations, and improvements to digital services.

In June 2025, Powerleague was acquired by Broadsword Investment Management. The existing executive team remained in place under the new ownership. Broadsword announced plans to support Powerleague’s expansion strategy, including site development, pitch regeneration, and entry into new sports sectors such as padel.

In September 2025, John Gillespie was named Powerleague CEO after Christian Rose retired.

== Operations ==
=== Football facilities ===
Powerleague operates 44 venues across England, Scotland, Ireland and Netherlands offering both outdoor and indoor five-a-side and seven-a-side football pitches. The facilities feature floodlit 3G artificial turf pitches and are available for casual bookings, league matches, kids parties and corporate events.

The company runs organised leagues and tournaments throughout the year, accommodating players of all skill levels from casual participants to competitive teams.

=== Kids football parties ===
Powerleague offers dedicated children's football party packages at its venues across the UK. These parties include pitch hire, qualified coaches to lead activities and games, and party room facilities for food and celebrations. The parties are designed for children of various age groups and can be customised to suit different party sizes and requirements.

=== Padel ===
In recent years, Powerleague has diversified its offering by investing significantly in padel tennis facilities. The company announced plans to open 76 padel courts across the UK by 2026, representing a major expansion into the rapidly growing sport.

Notable padel facility openings include:

- A six-figure investment in Stoke-on-Trent, adding padel courts to the existing football facility
- A four-court padel facility at the Edinburgh Sighthill club
- Portobello's first padel courts in Edinburgh

The padel expansion reflects the sport's growing popularity in the UK and Powerleague's strategy to diversify its recreational sports offering beyond traditional football.

=== Darts ===
In July 2026, Powerleague and Target Darts announced an official partnership, providing interactive darts lanes to 20 venues across the UK.

== Facilities ==
Powerleague venues typically include:

- Multiple 3G artificial turf pitches (both five-a-side and seven-a-side formats)
- Floodlighting for evening play
- Changing rooms and shower facilities
- On-site cafés and viewing areas
- Car parking
- Padel courts (at selected locations)
- Party rooms for kids events and functions
