= James Hay Partnership =

- Industry: financial
- Founded: 1979
- Founder: James Hay
- Defunct: 2026
- Headquarters: Salisbury, England
- Area served: United Kingdom
- Owner: Nucleus Financial (2021–present)
- Website: www.jameshay.co.uk

James Hay Partnership was a provider of financial services products in the UK with headquarters in Salisbury. The company was best known for administering Self Invested Personal Pensions (SIPPs) introduced in the Finance Act 1989.

In 2026, the James Hay brand was phased out and merged under a new umbrella company, Nucleus Financial.

== History ==
James Hay was founded in 1979 and incorporated in 1990 before becoming part of Abbey National (now Santander UK) in 1994. In 2010, Santander sold James Hay to its current parent, the IFG Group PLC, for a reported £35m.

James Hay became the largest provider of SIPPs in the UK during 2001 following a dramatic period of growth in the demand for these flexible pension products. James Hay performed the trustee administration for a number of insurance companies who offer SIPPs to their customers who are often introduced via IFAs (Independent Financial Advisers). In 2014 James Hay evolved its SIPP to include other non-pension wrappers such as general investment accounts (GIAs) and individual savings accounts (ISAs). The IFG Group owned several Adviser companies including London-based Saunderson House. In March 2014 IFG Group sold a number of these companies in order to focus on the James Hay and Saunderson House business units.

James Hay won the MoneyAge SIPP Provider of The Year award in 2020

In February 2021, James Hay purchased Nucleus Financial Platforms for £145m. As a result, of the purchase the James Hay Partnership formed a new parent company Nucleus Financial, and began migrating, along with other subsidiaries to a new platform under the Nucleus name in 2026. As a result, the company ceased all its operations under the James Hay brand.

== Operations ==
The company's parent, the IFG Group, was listed on the London Stock Exchange but was sold to private equity house Epiris for £206m in 2019

James Hay Partnership had headquarters in Salisbury where it employs around 500 staff. It also had offices in London and Bristol. Overall it employs around 600 people in the UK. These offices remained open under its rebrand to Nucleus Financial
