= Pension led funding =

Financial service in the UK

Pension Led Funding (PLF) is a financial services product offered in the United Kingdom (UK) that raises funds for businesses based upon the use of pension benefits accrued by owners or directors of the business they control. The money can then be used for the provision of a secured commercial loan, the purchase of commercial property, *the purchase of intellectual property assets, or the purchase of share capital (ordinary and redeemable preference shares).

Various corporate structures are eligible for this type of finance, including sole trader, partnership, limited liability partnership, limited company or franchise. The funding must be compliant with both financial regulations and Her Majesty’s Revenue and Customs (HMRC) prescriptions, and be planned so as to benefit both the company and the Pension Fund belonging to the business owner.

The two main sources of funds for PLF are Member-Directed Registered Pension Schemes, i.e. Self-Invested Personal Pensions (SIPP’s) and Small Self-Administered Schemes (SSAS’s). The schemes are typically devised by suitably-qualified and authorised financial advisers and implemented by experienced pension scheme administrators. Other professionals (i.e. chartered surveyors, solicitors and valuation specialists) may also be indirectly involved in the process.

== Claimed benefits ==
The benefits of PLF claimed by providers are that such schemes provide access to commercial finance in circumstances when traditional lending options (such as bank loans or invoice discounting / factoring) to businesses is restricted and/or subject to potentially onerous terms. In PLF schemes, it is the owners of the business and funds who decide whether the risks are acceptable, not an outside party such as a bank. Thus, providers claim that PLF can assist business owners in achieving financial and operational independence, control and flexibility. According to independent research by Nesta (charity) and the University of Cambridge: "Since obtaining funding, 62 per cent have seen their profit grow, 59 per cent have increased turnover and 43 per cent have employed more people." Because PLF effectively requires a substantial accrual of pension benefits, it has proved attractive to more mature entrepreneurs - particularly the over-50s, known as 'olderpreneurs'

== Assessment of appropriateness ==
Financial and taxation regulations require that a PLF programme must benefit the owner(s) of the pension scheme. Thus PLF providers require that several criteria are satisfied through a process of due diligence to establish the suitability of a PLF programme on a case by case basis. The risks associated with PLF make it less appropriate for some, particularly those who have few non-pension assets or whose organisation’s cashflow position is such that it would prevent scheme repayments. A detailed analysis of attitude to risk and capacity for loss is, therefore, part of the process of assessment.

The due diligence process includes detailed assessment of the following:

- Company accounts
- Track record
- Business Plan
- Projections for the individual business and the business sector in which it operates
- Motivations and future plans of the business owner(s)/director(s)
- The existing pensions of the business owner(s)/director(s)

== Risks ==
Like any form of investment, PLF is not without risk.

=== Regulatory risk ===
Ensuring that the process is compliant with relevant financial and taxation regulations is an important and complex consideration. Those seeking to implement a PLF programme can reduce the risk of failure to comply with regulations by engaging the services of suitably experienced and qualified financial professionals to set up the PLF arrangement.

The legislation governing the self-investment of accrued pension funds is complicated. Most of the current rules and regulations came into effect on 6 April 2006, although there have been some amendments and developments since that time.

The sanctions imposed in the event of non-compliance and/or misconduct (whether due to oversight or malpractice) can be severe. Working with Financial Conduct Authority (FCA)-regulated advisers and pension administrators who ensure all Her Majesty’s Revenue and Customs (HMRC) scheme registration criteria are met is, therefore, to be recommended.

=== Risk of default ===
Using some of the accrued pension benefits of an individual (or a group) to fund a single trading entity is a relatively high-risk undertaking. This is why pension funds are often placed in a spread of investments to minimise the risk of loss. Risk also comes from the degree of exposure to market vagaries and trading (mis)fortunes. It is possible to mitigate the risk of default to an extent and the provision of security or collateral is a typical characteristic of PLF transactions. Pension funds can still be detrimentally affected. In the event of a default, HMRC sanction charges can be applied if the default process has not been administered correctly.

=== Skill and credibility of providers ===
Levels of experience and specific expertise vary significantly within the finance industry. Thus anyone who is looking to engage in a PLF programme should be encouraged to research the options thoroughly, giving equal attention to assessing the credibility of practitioners.

== Costs ==
There are typically two main costs with PLF. An advisory firm will devise a suitable strategy, having satisfied the relevant due diligence and compliance requirements. A trustee/administration company will then assume responsibility for the implementation of the project (in accordance with HMRC rules and regulations). It is standard practice for advisers and administrators to be paid separately for their respective services.
