= Bert Rürup =

German economist

- Born: Hans-Adalbert Rürup; 7 November 1943 (age 82); Essen, Rhine Province, Prussia
- Education: University of Cologne
- Scientific career
- Fields: Economics
- Workplaces: Darmstadt University of Technology

Hans-Adalbert Rürup (born 7 November 1943) is a German economist and former chairman of the German Council of Economic Experts. He was formerly a professor of economics at the Darmstadt University of Technology. From 2010 to 2012, he was president of the International School of Management in Dortmund. In 2013 he changed into the ISM's board of trustees and took up a position as the president of the newly founded Handelsblatt Research Institute .

== See also ==
- Rürup-Rente, part of the private pensions in Germany
