= Patron Capital =

European private equity real estate fund

Patron Capital Partners
- Type: Limited Partnerships
- Industry: Private equity, real estate
- Founded: 1999
- Founder: Keith Breslauer
- Headquarters: London, England, UK (main adviser)
- Products: Investments, private equity fund
- Total assets: €4.0bn (equity)
- Number of employees: 73 (Patron team)
- Website: www.patroncapital.com

Patron Capital Partners ("Patron") is a European private equity real estate fund with its main investment advisor, Patron Capital Advisers LLP based in London, England. Patron Capital Partners represents approximately €4.0 billion of equity across several funds and related co-investments.

Its strategy is opportunistic and value-oriented, primarily targeting challenged assets such as distressed and/or undervalued property and property-related assets, loans and corporate entities.

Patron was established in 1999 by Keith M. Breslauer is the founding partner and the managing director of Patron Capital. As of April 2020, the Patron team consists of 73 professionals including 41 investment professionals and advisers.

Patron has operations across Europe with its main advisory offices in the UK, Luxembourg and Spain, and operates extensively through its local partners across all markets, with major operating partners in most markets including Germany, France and Portugal. As of December 2019, Patron has invested in 80 investments in 16 countries.

In addition to individual assets, Patron's investee companies include Punch Taverns, which owns a number of pubs in the UK, and the Powerleague five-a-side football centres. Previous investments include CALA Homes, Motor Fuel Group, Optimum Credit and Generator Hostels.

Patron Capital is collaborating with Big Society Capital to develop a property fund, Women in Safe Homes (“WISH”). The fund endeavours to help secure housing for women who are homeless, ex-offenders, survivors of domestic abuse, or who have other complex needs.

== Funds ==
Patron represents approximately €4,0 billion of capital across several funds and related co-investments. Investors include universities, institutions, private foundations, and high-net-worth individuals located throughout North America, Europe and Middle East and Asia. It has delivered average annual returns in the high teens since the business was founded in 1999.

- Captive Fund (1999), €76m
- Patron Capital L.P. I (2001), $110m (€82m)
- Patron Capital, L.P. II (2005), €303m
- Patron Capital, L.P. III (2007), €868m
- Patron Capital, L.P. IV (2011), €781m + €300m co-investment
- Patron Capital, L.P. V (2016), €806m + €143m co-investment
- Patron Capital, L.P. VI (2019), not disclosed
- WISH Fund, information not disclosed

== Recent investments and exits ==
Recent transactions include:

- In March 2013, Patron and Legal & General acquired CALA Group Limited, a UK home builder. As of June 2013, CALA’s land bank was over 10,000 plots with a further 4,500 plots within a longer term strategic landbank, with a gross development value in excess of £3.2 billion
- In July 2013, Patron Capital acquired a 20,000sqm single-tenanted office complex located in Malakoff, Paris
- In October 2013, a complex of 5 connected commercial real estate assets in central Manchester including the 23,000 spectator capacity Manchester Arena and 14,000 sqm of offices, were sold for £82.1m
- In January 2014, Patron acquired the Clarion Hotel in the International Financial Services Centre in Dublin
- In March 2014, Patron’s investment CALA Group acquired developer Banner Homes
- In May 2014, Paron acquired a €228m loan portfolio from NAMA
- In May 2014, Patron and Leipziger Stadtbau AG sold two buildings in Leipzig
- In May 2014, Patron and Pamera acquired Ridlerstrasse 55 in Munich
- In August 2014, Patron sold Gracewell Healthcare for £153m
- In September 2014, Patron sold Mollstrasse 1, a freehold office property in Berlin-Mitte to Schroder Property
- In October 2014, Patron, via its UK forecourt business Motor Fuel Group, completed its acquisition of the entire UK retail business of Murco Petroleum Limited
- In November 2014, Patron sold a minority stake in its Generator Hostels business to Invesco
- In March 2015, Patron sold a retail property in Braunschweig, Lower Saxony to Redevco Services Deutschland GmbH
- In May 2015, Patron acquired Arlington Business Park in Theale, Reading, and The Mint, a 120,000 sq ft office building in Leeds
- In June 2015, Patron sold Motor Fuel Group to Clayton, Dubilier & Rice
- In June 2015, Patron Capital and Suprema acquired a 51,000 sqm office complex from GE Real Estate
- In July 2015, Patron sold its office investment in Malakoff, south of Paris, to Eurosic for €80m
- In July 2015, Patron Capital acquired a shared equity mortgage portfolio from Galliford Try plc
- In September 2015, Patron Capital and APAM sold Crossways Point buildings in Dartford to CCLA Investment Management Ltd
- On 12 October 2015, Patron Capital and RBS sold Jupiter Hotels for £160m
- In December 2015, Patron acquired 7,000 sqm of existing residential asset blocks in Chamonix (France)
- In December 2015, Patron together with Development Partner acquired “One Cologne” in Venloer Straße in Cologne
- In January 2016, Patron Capital and Electra Partners purchased Grainger Retirement Solutions for £325 million
- In February 2016, Patron sold its stake in the Staybridge Suites hotel in Liverpool to its partner Cycas Hospitality
- In February 2016, Patron Capital acquired four office buildings (c. 153,000 sq. ft.) at East Point Business Park in Dublin
- In July 2016, Patron Capital acquired a portfolio of 4 buildings, located across Spain, comprising 163 residential flats, 270 parking spaces and 163 storage rooms from Santander
- In September 2016, Patron Capital and Fitzpatrick Lifestyle Hotels group sold Spencer Hotel in Dublin to John Malone Partnership
- In October 2016, Patron Capital sold its office complex Campus West in Munich to Quantum
- In November 2016, Patron completed the acquisition of 7 mainly office assets (4 office buildings, 2 office floors and 1 retail floor) in Madrid and Barcelona
- In December 2016, Patron Capital sold its office building Connect on Ridlerstrasse in Munich to a British institutional fund manager
- In January 2017, Habitat Invest and Patron Capital announced a joint venture to invest in development of new urban renewal projects in Portugal for residential use
- In March 2017, Patron Capital invested in three shopping centres in Spain together with Eurofund Capital Partners. The assets are located in Cuenca, Alcalá de Guadaira and Alzamora in Alcoy
- In March 2017, Patron Capital sold Generator Hostels to Queensgate Investments for €450 million
- In April 2017, Patron Capital sold The Badby Group to Elysium Healthcare
- In April 2017, Patron Capital acquired additional interests in Retirement Bridge Group to own 100% of the Group
- In June 2017, Patron Capital together with Paulus Immobilien GmbH purchased a development site in Frankfurt’s Europaviertel
- In June 2017, Patron Capital and Suprema sold its Berlin office complex investment to Allianz
- In July 2017, Patron Capital sold its investment in one of the largest Dutch Real Estate platforms, Merin, to DREAM Global
- In July 2017, Optimum Credit, owned by Patron, completed the first public securitisation of second-charge mortgages by a UK mortgage lender since the credit crisis
- In August 2017, Patron Capital and Heineken completed £1.8 billion acquisition of Punch Taverns, which owns a number of pubs in the UK, including The Griffin, Whetstone.
- In September 2017, Patron Capital and First Base acquired the former Amex headquarters in Brighton for a mixed-use scheme providing new homes, workspace and convenience stores
- In October 2017, Patron Capital sold Luxury Family Hotel to the management team and its backers
- In October 2017, Patron Capital acquired Jacobs Inn Hostel in Dublin
- In May 2018, Patron Capital acquired Le Magnum, an office building in Greater Paris
- In September 2018, Patron Capital sold a portfolio of office properties in Dublin to Madison International Realty
- In September 2018, Patron Capital and a Spanish residential developer acquired a number of residential properties with the objective of investing into different projects across Spain
- In November 2018, Patron Capital acquired a portfolio of residential development properties in Catalonia and the Balearic Islands provinces of Spain
- In December 2018, Patron Capital completed the sale of the UK Shared Equity Mortgage investment to Gresham House
- In March 2019, Patron Capital acquired the Sheraton Warsaw Hotel, located in central Warsaw, Poland
- In March 2019, Patron Capital sold Capital Park to Madison International Realty
- In November 2019, Patron Capital sold Jacobs Inn Hostel in Dublin to BlackRock Real Estate
- In February 2020, Patron Capital completed the sale of Arlington Business Park
- From 2010 to 2020, Patron Capital acquired 19 care homes and 40 land plots for building high-end care homes across the UK
- In July 2022, Patron Capital completed the sale of Barbosa du Bocage 35, a 3,600 sqm office building fully leased to Uber located in Lisbon, Portugal

== Awards ==
Patron has won many awards over the years as well as being shortlisted for many awards in relation to specific investments, capital raise, fund manager, social investing and for Patron’s significant charity work and contribution.

In 2017 Patron was named “Property Fund Manager of the Year” at Property Week’s Property Awards and won the Deal of the Year at Property Week’s RESI Awards. It has also shared the award for “The Best Places to Work in Property”.

In 2018, Patron was awarded the Business Culture Corporate Social Responsibility Award at the Business Culture Awards 2019. It also won Deal of the Year at the Retailers' Retailer Awards.

In 2019, Patron was awarded the “Residential Care Provider of the Year” at Health Investor Awards and “Opportunistic Fund of the Year” from REFI Europe Awards. It also won “Best Delivered Scheme outside of London under 35,000sq/ft” by Office Agents Society Development Awards and “Business Culture Corporate Social Responsibility Award” at Business Culture Awards.

In 2020, Patron has been shortlisted for “Fund Manager of the Year” at Property Week Awards, “Property Manager of the Year” at Asset Management Awards, and “Pro Bono Company of the Year” & “Partnership with a National Charity” at Better Society Awards 2020.
