= Personal pension scheme =

Type of UK retirement/pension plan

A personal pension scheme (PPS), sometimes called a personal pension plan (PPP), is a UK tax-privileged individual investment vehicle, with the primary purpose of building a capital sum to provide retirement benefits, although it will usually also provide death benefits.

These plans first became available on 1 July 1988 and replaced retirement annuity plans. Both the individual can contribute as well as their employer. Benefits can be taken at any time after age 55 if the plan rules allow, or earlier in the case of ill health. In the past, legislation required benefits to be taken before age 75, and many plans still contain this restriction. Part of the fund (usually 25%) may be taken as a tax-free lump sum at retirement. New rules on drawing on the retirement fund, known as "Pension Freedom", came into effect on 5 April 2015.

There are two types of personal pension scheme: insured personal pensions, where each contract will have a set range of investment funds for planholders to choose from (this is not as restrictive as it sounds, as some modern schemes have over a thousand fund options) and self-invested personal pensions (SIPPs).

Insured personal pensions with charges capped at a low level, and which satisfy certain other conditions, are known as stakeholder pension.

== Contributions ==
Contributions to a PPS can be made either from the individual or from an employer. An individual can, each year, put in an amount up to the lower of 100% of their earned income or the prevailing annual allowance. The annual allowance has fluctuated over time; it was reduced to £40,000 from the 2014–15 tax year, but was subsequently increased to £60,000 starting from the 2023–24 tax year. An individual can put in higher amounts if they want to, but would not be allowed to claim tax relief on the surplus, and may face a tax charge. On the other end, low or non-earners are allowed to contribute up to £3,600 per year gross.

An employer can contribute an amount of up to the annual allowance each year, provided that they can demonstrate to the local inspector of taxes that this contribution has been made wholly and exclusively for the purposes of the business. This definition is open to wide interpretation and HMRC have yet to provide any more concrete guidelines.

== Tax treatment ==
Personal contributions receive basic rate tax relief at the source claimed by the provider. That is: a basic-rate taxpayer's contribution of £80 will be grossed up to £100 on payment to the provider. Higher-rate taxpayers can claim additional relief through their tax return if they have one, or by otherwise contacting HMRC (neither being a higher rate taxpayer, or having paid too much tax, are triggers for HMRC to request that a tax return is completed). In this example, they would be able to claim back £20, so they would have effectively paid out only £60.

Higher rate and additional rate taxpayers can obtain up to 40% or 45% relief on pension contributions, respectively. Because only basic rate relief is applied at source, these taxpayers must claim the extra relief through their self-assessment tax return or by contacting HMRC to adjust their tax code.

An employer's contribution is paid gross and is an allowable expense against income or corporation tax.

The PPS fund itself grows tax-advantageously in that it is not subject to UK capital gains tax. In addition, any income generated by assets within the pension fund (e.g. dividend income from shares) does not suffer any additional tax although the pension fund cannot reclaim any withholding tax already deducted from that income.

== Taking retirement benefits ==
The PPS can be crystallised, or vested, that is used to provide benefits, from age 55 (up from 50 prior to 6 April 2010). A PPS must be crystallised by the age of 75, minimising problems from the mortality drag of deferring the purchase of income benefits. On crystallisation, a pension commencement lump sum (PCLS), also known as tax-free cash, of up to 25% of the fund can be taken. The remainder can be used to provide a taxable income either directly from the fund (called unsecured pension (USP), and has previously been called income drawdown or pension fund withdrawal), or by exchanging the fund for a secured pension income through the purchase of an annuity.

One of the most attractive benefits of taking USP as opposed to annuity purchase is the ability to bequeath or pass on the value of one's pension fund in some form. There is also the possibility of further capital and income growth in this part of retirement, although there are corresponding risks, and the Financial Conduct Authority (FCA) suggests that one should consult an independent financial adviser both prior to entering into a USP arrangement and regularly throughout.

An option for post 75-year-olds, called alternatively secured pension (ASP), was introduced in 2006. This was still to allow the value of one's fund to pass onto the next generation on death, although only into one's dependents' pension funds rather than as cash and only subject to possible inheritance tax (IHT) charges.

== Pension Freedom ==
On 6 April 2015, new pension rules for drawdown giving greater flexibility came into effect. They apply to people aged from 55 (57 from 2028) with private pensions, where they and/or their employers have saved up a pot of cash for retirement, technically known as a "defined contribution" or "money purchase" pension scheme. The new rules mean that 25% of the retirement fund can be taken as a tax-free lump sum, and the rest can be drawn as taxable cash, used to buy an annuity, used to buy a flexible income drawdown product or any combination of these. Before making a choice, everyone has a new right to free and impartial guidance at retirement to help them make an informed decision on what is right for them.

== See also ==
- Collective investment schemes
- Income drawdown
- Pensions in the United Kingdom
- Pension tax simplification
- Retirement annuity plan
- Self-invested personal pension
- Stakeholder pension scheme
- Taxation in the United Kingdom
