= David Prosser (financier) =

British financier

- Born: March 26, 1944; Barry, Glamorgan, United Kingdom
- Died: March 9, 2020 (aged 75)
- Occupation: Business executive
- Known for: Leading the turnaround of Legal & General insurance in the 1990s
- Spouse: Rosemary Snuggs (m. 1971)
- Children: 2

Sir David John Prosser (26 March 1944 – 9 March 2020) was a British financier. He was chief executive of Legal & General from 1991 until 2005. Sir David died on March 9, 2020. He was 75 years old.
