= John Browne, Baron Browne of Madingley =

British politician and businessman (born 1948)

The Right Honourable The Lord Browne of Madingley FRS FREng FGS
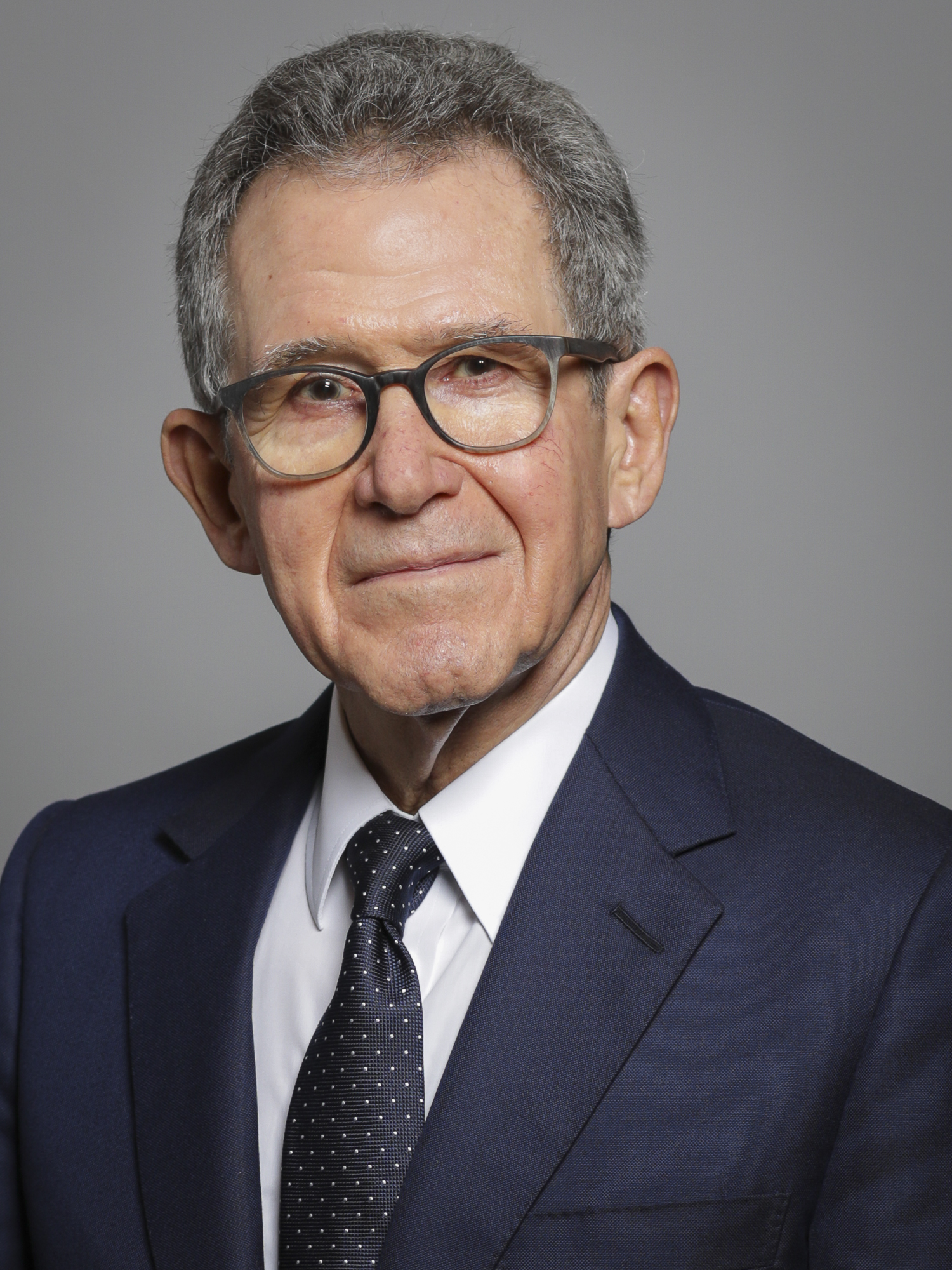
- Official portrait, 2019

Chief Executive Officer of BP
- In office 1995–2007
- Preceded by: David Simon
- Succeeded by: Tony Hayward

Member of the House of Lords
- Lord Temporal
- Life peerage 28 June 2001

Personal details
- Born: Edmund John Phillip Browne; 20 February 1948 (age 78) Hamburg, Germany
- Party: None (crossbench)
- Education: The King's School, Ely
- Alma mater: St John's College, Cambridge; Stanford University
- Occupation: Executive chairman of L1 Energy, past president of the Royal Academy of Engineering, author, member of the House of Lords

Edmund John Phillip Browne, Baron Browne of Madingley (born 20 February 1948), is a British businessman and a crossbench member of the House of Lords.

Browne was the chief executive of BP between 1995 and 2007, which has been described as the company's "golden period of expansion and diversification". During his tenure, Browne oversaw the mergers with Amoco and ARCO and gained access to Russian oil reserves with the creation of TNK-BP. Nicknamed the "Sun King" for his management style, he was praised for transforming the oil and gas industry's approach to climate change, and for creating a renewable and alternative energy business within BP. He resigned from BP in May 2007 in controversial circumstances surrounding his personal life and sexuality.

He is a former president of the Royal Academy of Engineering (2006 to July 2011), and has served on the boards of Goldman Sachs, Intel and Daimler Benz. He joined the House of Lords in 2001. Browne is a former partner at Riverstone Holdings, where he was co-head of its renewable energy private equity fund. He received his undergraduate education at the University of Cambridge and later attended Stanford University. Browne was a candidate in the 2025 University of Cambridge Chancellor election.

== Early life and education ==
Browne was born on 20 February 1948 in Hamburg, Germany. His father was a British Army officer who later worked for the Anglo-Persian Oil Company which later became British Petroleum. His mother, Paula, was a Hungarian Jewish Auschwitz survivor. Many members of Browne's Jewish maternal family, including his grandparents, were murdered at the Birkenau concentration camp during the Holocaust.

Browne was educated at The King's School (now called King's Ely) and St John's College, Cambridge, where he earned a First Class BA degree in physics. He also holds an MS degree in business from Stanford University, California.

== Career ==
=== BP ===
At the suggestion of his father, Browne joined BP as an apprentice in 1966 while still at university. He remained with the corporation throughout his career.

Between 1969 and 1983, he held a variety of exploration and production posts in Anchorage, Alaska, New York, San Francisco, London and Canada. In 1984 he became group treasurer and chief executive of BP Finance International. In April 1986, he took up the position of executive vice president and chief financial officer of Standard Oil of Ohio in Cleveland, Ohio. In 1987, following the BP/Standard merger, in addition to his position as executive vice president and chief financial officer of BP America, he was appointed chief executive officer of Standard Oil Production Company. In 1989, he became managing director and chief executive officer of BP Exploration based in London. In September 1991, he joined BP's board as a managing director.

He was appointed group chief executive on 10 June 1995 after the British government sold its last remaining stake in the company. Following the merger of BP and Amoco, he became group chief executive of the combined group on 31 December 1998 and served until 1 May 2007. He was one of the most highly paid executives in the UK, with a remuneration package of approximately £5.7 million in 2004.

From 1997, Browne sought to re-brand BP. The company linked itself in its corporate communications with green issues by the overt link of its BP initials with the phrase "Beyond Petroleum". Browne stated that the right to self-determination was crucial for people everywhere, and that he saw his company's mission as to find ways to meet current needs without excessive harm to the environment, while developing future, more sustainable sources of energy. He promised that BP would reduce its own CO_{2} emissions by 10% by 2010, a target which was achieved nine years ahead of schedule.

=== Resignation from BP ===
It was announced on 25 July 2006 that Browne would stand down as chief executive of BP in December 2008. There had been press speculation that he had wished to continue beyond this date, but he made it clear that he did not wish to do so. On 6 January 2007, Browne won his first interim injunction against the publication of allegations by his former partner, Jeff Chevalier. Browne later disclosed being "terrified" that his sexuality would be revealed publicly. A week later it was announced that his retirement date had been brought forward to July 2007 and that Tony Hayward would succeed him. In April 2007, after a court case lasting over four weeks, Browne appealed to the Judicial Committee of the House of Lords, who ruled that he could not prevent Associated Newspapers from printing allegations about his romantic life and alleged misuse of company funds. Lord Browne resigned from BP on 1 May 2007 and resigned as a non-executive director of Goldman Sachs on 10 May 2007

At the time he faced allegations that he had supported his partner, Canadian Jeff Chevalier, throughout their four-year relationship, and when Chevalier moved back to Toronto at the end of the relationship, that Browne paid for 12 months of a lease on an apartment. Browne says he felt under pressure to resign due to UK newspaper Mail on Sunday's revelations about his personal life and relationship with Chevalier. As part of a statement made at the time of his resignation, he commented: "In my 41 years with BP, I have kept my private life separate from my business life. I have always regarded my sexuality as a personal matter, to be kept private. It is a matter of deep disappointment that a newspaper group has now decided that allegations about my personal life should be made public."

A court accepted that Browne had lied over how he met Chevalier. In a deposition to the court, Browne said the pair had met in a London park; Browne's associates later acknowledged that he had actually met Chevalier via a website called Suited and Booted. However, Mr Justice Eady, the presiding judge in the case, said he decided not to refer the matter to the attorney general, seeing disclosure in the judgement of Lord Browne's behaviour as "probably sufficient punishment", and adding Browne's "willingness to tell a deliberate lie to the court, persisted in for about two weeks, ... is relevant in assessing his own credibility and the overall merits. So too is his willingness casually to 'trash' the reputation of Mr Chevalier and to discredit him in the eyes of the court".

BP chairman, Peter Sutherland, characterised claims that company assets and resources had been abused as "unfounded or insubstantive".

=== Later career ===
In October 2010, it was announced that he had been appointed chairman of the advisory board at Stanhope Capital as the asset manager gears up for international expansion. The former chief executive of BP will help advise on attracting investment from charities and endowment trusts, which at present make up a small number of the Stanhope's total clients.

Browne worked as Chairman of Cuadrilla Resources in the early 2010s. He was also a managing partner at Riverstone Holdings, the venture capital firm behind Cuadrilla.

Browne left Cuadrilla in 2015 to become executive chairman of L1 Energy, "an oil and gas firm backed by Russian billionaire Mikhail Fridman.

In 2019, Browne said that "fracking in the UK doesn’t make much sense. I think it was a test to see if it worked. We probably don’t need to do it."

In 2025, Browne announced his candidacy for the election as chancellor of the University of Cambridge. Among those supporting his candidacy were the head of the Climate Crisis Advisory Group, David King, the former chair of the UK Climate Change Committee, Lord Deben, and Andrew Turnbull, a Trustee of the Global Warming Policy Foundation. An open letter signed by more than 200 academics argued that he was an inappropriate candidate both for the role he played in introducting a market-driven model of higher education and for his long career in the oil and gas industry. He came fourth in the ballot, behind Sandi Toksvig, Mohamed El-Arian and the winner, Chris Smith.

== Other activities ==
He was president of the Royal Academy of Engineering from 2006 to 2011. He was elected a Fellow of the Royal Society in 2006. In 1998, he was knighted by Queen Elizabeth II and in 2001 named by the House of Lords Appointments Commission as one of the "people's peers" taking the title Baron Browne of Madingley, of Cambridge in the County of Cambridgeshire, and becoming a crossbencher in the House of Lords. In 2000, he was the recipient of the FIRST Responsible Capitalism Award. He was appointed a trustee of the Tate Gallery on 1 August 2007 and chair of the trustees in January 2009. In November 2009, it was announced that he would chair an independent review into university tuition fees which reported in October 2010. In June 2010, he was appointed as the government's lead non-executive director, charged with recruiting business leaders to reformed departmental boards.

He is chairman of the international advisory board of the Blavatnik School of Government at the University of Oxford, and chairman of the trustees of the Queen Elizabeth Prize for Engineering. He is chairman of the Francis Crick Institute, chairman of the Donmar Warehouse Theatre, and since September 2017 has served as chairman of the Courtauld Institute of Art, following the end of his tenure at Tate. He is also a trustee of the Holocaust Educational Trust.

Browne sits on the board of directors of IHS Markit and SparkCognition, and is a member of the advisory boards of Edelman, Schillings, and the big data technology companies Afiniti, Kayrros and Windward. Between 2015 and 2020, he served as non-executive chairman of Huawei UK.

He is the founder and chairman of the John Browne Charitable Trust, which "supports projects that will make a tangible difference to the lives of people with great potential, particularly those from under-represented backgrounds." Over the past 20 years, the trust has distributed more than £2 million.

Browne joined General Atlantic as a senior advisor in 2021 and is co-founder and Chairman of BeyondNetZero, a climate growth equity venture with General Atlantic, targeting investments in companies providing solutions to climate change.

From 2015 to 2021, Browne was appointed executive chairman of L1 Energy, an energy investment vehicle co-owned by Russian billionaire Mikhail Fridman. In December 2017, it was reported that Browne had led negotiations to create a new joint venture between L1 Energy and BASF, merging their respective oil and gas businesses to create Wintershall Dea, where Browne now chairs the supervisory board.

Browne was the UK Government lead non-executive director until January 2015. His remit was to work with secretaries of state to appoint non-executives to the board of each government department. In April 2021, Browne was appointed co-chairman of the Prime Minister's Council for Science and Technology.

=== The Browne Review ===
On 12 October 2010, the report of the inquiry headed by Lord Browne of Madingley was published under the title Securing a Sustainable Future for Higher Education. The main recommendation of the report was that the current cap of £3,290 on university tuition fees should be lifted thereby allowing such institutions to determine their own fee structure.

== Publications ==
Lord Browne of Madingley published his memoirs Beyond Business in February 2010. Seven Elements that Changed the World, an examination of the role of seven scientific elements in history, was published in April 2013. On 17 June 2014 he published The Glass Closet: Why Coming Out Is Good Business, a book discussing the risks and rewards of coming out in business and advocating for a top-down corporate policy of LGBT inclusiveness. Lord Browne of Madingley is said to be the first openly gay CEO of any Fortune 500 company.

1. Beyond Business (February 2010)
2. Seven Elements that Have Changed the World (April 2013)
3. The Glass Closet: Why Coming Out Is Good Business (May 2014)
4. Connect: How companies succeed by engaging radically with society (September 2015)
5. Make, Think, Imagine: Engineering the Future of Civilisation (May 2019)

In 2015, he was co-author of the report that launched the Global Apollo Programme, which calls for developed nations to commit to spending 0.02% of their GDP for 10 years, to fund co-ordinated research to make carbon-free baseload electricity less costly than electricity from coal by the year 2025.

== Controversies ==
Browne is described by journalist and author Tom Bower as responsible for a "ruthless" programme of cost-cutting at BP that compromised safety, and thus the man most responsible for a string of major accidents including the Texas City refinery explosion (2005) and the Deepwater Horizon explosion (2010). Browne has rejected Bower's "unsubstantiated" and "wholly inaccurate" account.

According to The Guardian newspaper, "Browne's reputation was tarnished by a string of accidents in the US which hastened his retirement", and Browne declined to appear in an hour-long BBC2 documentary on the Deepwater Horizon oil spill in which Tony Hayward was extensively interviewed, broadcast in November 2010.

== Personal life ==
Browne lists 17th- and 18th-century illustrated Italian books, pre-Columbian art, contemporary art, music, opera and the theatre among his interests.

Browne lives in Chelsea, London, where his home was created by the British furniture and interiors designer Tim Gosling. In 2017 he also had a house in Venice and he made use of the private jet company NetJets 'to travel around Europe both on my private business and on my vacations'. In a promotional interview, he stated that he valued 'the ability to turn up at an airport within 10 minutes of a flight, get on the plane, and if things work, immediately take off and then land at the other end and immediately leave the airport. There’s no waste of time and that’s really very good, especially on short haul'.

He is a Fellow (FREng) and former president of the Royal Academy of Engineering (2006–2011), a Fellow of the Royal Society (FRS), a Fellow of the Institute of Materials, Minerals and Mining (FIMMM), a Fellow of the Institute of Physics (FInstP), a Fellow of the Institute of Petroleum (FInstPet), a Fellow of the American Academy of Arts & Sciences, a Companion of the Institute of Management (CIMgt), an Honorary Fellow of the Institution of Chemical Engineers (HonFIChemE), a Fellow of the Geological Society (FGS), an Honorary Fellow of the Institution of Mechanical Engineers (HonFIMechE), and an Honorary Fellow of the Royal Society of Chemistry (HonFRSC).

Browne has been awarded Honorary Doctorates from Heriot-Watt University (D.Eng.) and Robert Gordon University (D.Tech.), Aston University in Birmingham, University of Dundee (LLD), Warwick University (D.Sc.), Hull University (D.Sc.), Cranfield University (D.Sc.), Sheffield Hallam University (Hon. D Univ), University of Buckingham (D.Sc.), University of Belfast (Hon DSc 0 Eng) and the University of Surrey (Hon D.Univ.), Imperial College, London (Hon D.Sc.), Leuven University, Belgium (D.Sc.), Thunderbird (LLD), University of Notre Dame (LLD), Colorado School of Mines (D.Eng), D Mendeleyev University of Chemical Technology of Russia, Arizona State University (DHLitt). He is an Honorary Fellow of St John's College, Cambridge and a senior member of St Antony's College, Oxford.

In 1999, The Royal Academy of Engineering awarded him the Prince Philip Medal for his outstanding contribution to engineering. In 2000, he received the Golden Plate Award of the American Academy of Achievement.

Browne kept his homosexuality private for 50 years. He believes homophobia is not just an issue for employees but for companies and business as a whole.

== Arms ==
Coat of arms of John Browne, Baron Browne of Madingley
Coronet Coronet of a baron Crest A bittern booming affrontée quarterly Vert and Gules beaked and legged Or between two Bulrushes that on the dexter Vert and that on the sinister Gules Escutcheon Argent two Bendlets per saltire Vert and Gules between three Ammonites in bend sinister Vert ribbed Or Supporters On the dexter side a Bear sejant erect reguardant Gules gorged with a Plain Collar attached thereto a Chain reflexed over the back and on the sinister a Bear sejant erect reguardant Vert gorged with a Plain Collar attached thereto a Chain reflexed over the back Or Motto Momento Historiae Badge A Bear sejant erect reguardant Gules gorged with a Plain Collar attached thereto a Chain reflexed over the back Or and holding between the forefeet an Ammonite Vert ribbed Or

Business positions
Preceded by David Simon	Chief Executive of BP; 1995–2007	Succeeded by Tony Hayward
Orders of precedence in the United Kingdom
Preceded by The Lord Condon	Gentlemen; Baron Browne of Madingley	Followed by The Lord Adebowale
