= Pension tax simplification =

British pension tax change policy

Pension tax simplification, sometimes referred to as pension simplification was a British overhaul in 2006 of taxation rules for United Kingdom pension schemes. The aim was to reduce the complicated patchwork of legislation built-up by successive administrations which were seen as acting as a barrier to the public when considering retirement planning. The measures were introduced as part of the UK government's Finance Act 2004. The new regime introduced considerable freedom in the tax relievable contributions for pension schemes and the assets in which they may be invested. It was a significant change to the UK pension system at that time.

== History ==
The pension tax simplification was a policy announced in 2004 by the Labour government to rationalise the British tax system as applied to pension schemes. The government wanted to encourage retirement provision by simplifying the previous eight tax regimes into one single regime for all individual and occupational pensions. The measure was passed in law when the UK parliament passed the Finance Act 2004 and took effect from so called A-day on 6 April 2006.

== Main changes ==
Broadly the new regime allowed considerable freedom in the tax relievable contributions to pension schemes and the assets in which they may be invested. It also, however, capped the size of tax-favoured pension funds that may be accumulated by an individual. This 'lifetime allowance' was set at £1.6M for 2007–08 and was increased and then decreased over time. Funds accumulated in excess of the lifetime allowance are subject to a penalty tax charge of 55%. Transitional protection provisions were made for individuals who had already accumulated pension funds in excess of this amount.

The rules were designed to provide:

- Full concurrency – individuals could contribute to personal and occupational schemes at the same time
- Single tax regime – one set of tax rules for all pensions
- Lifetime allowance – a total amount of pension over which charges may be levied if you have no protection
- Annual allowance – obtain tax relief on contributions of up to £3,600 or 100% of income, if greater, subject to a maximum
- Alternative secured pensions – it became possible to avoid purchasing an annuity even after age 75
- Single allowable investment regime – all schemes allowed to hold qualifying investments

In addition to these changes, employees aged 50 could withdraw up to 25% of each of their pension funds as a tax–free lump sum when it comes into payment, whether or not they continue to work. The age at which a pension can begin to be paid was increased to 55 on 6 April 2010. This adjustment aimed to provide individuals with more flexibility in managing their retirement finances while aligning with evolving demographics and changing work patterns.

== Member-directed pension schemes ==
The changes also impacted two types of member-directed pension scheme, the Self-Invested Personal Pension (SIPP) and Small Self Administered Scheme (SASS). These two different arrangements were largely brought into line with each other, with the following exceptions:

- SIPP would still be managed by an administrator;
- SSAS no longer requires a pensioner trustee;
- SSAS continues to be able to offer loans to a sponsoring employer, although such 'loanbacks' had to be secured against an asset of the borrower.

== See also ==
- Taxation in the United Kingdom
- UK labour law
- UK pensions
- Personal pensions
- Self-invested personal pensions
- Small Self Administered Schemes
