= The Glass Closet: Why Coming Out Is Good Business =

2014 book by John Browne, Baron Browne of Madingley

- First edition
- Authors: John Browne
- Language: English
- Genre: Non-fiction
- Publisher: Jonathan Cape
- Publication date: 2014
- Pages: 240
- ISBN: 9780062316974

The Glass Closet: Why Coming Out Is Good Business is a 2014 book by John Browne, the former Chief Executive Officer of BP. Building on Browne's 2010 memoir Beyond Business, in which he discussed the pressures of being closeted at work for decades, The Glass Closet takes a broader look at the experience of gay people in the workplace through statistics, interviews and case studies. Browne argues that LGBT-inclusive company environments increase worker productivity and identifies seven actions companies can take to allow their staff to be out at work, including creating LGBT groups and encouraging managers to be straight allies.
