= Stakeholder pension scheme =

A stakeholder pension scheme is a type of personal pension in the United Kingdom.

== Aims ==
The schemes were introduced on 6 April 2001 as a consequence of the Welfare Reform and Pensions Act 1999. They were intended to encourage more long-term saving for retirement, particularly among those on low to moderate earnings. They are required to meet a number of conditions set out in legislation, including a cap on charges, low minimum contributions, and flexibility in relation to stopping and starting contributions. Employers with five or more employees are required to provide access to a stakeholder pension scheme for their employees unless they offer a suitable alternative pension scheme. The features of stakeholder pensions were intended to make them cheaper to sell than existing personal pensions and to provide a more transparent and attractive saving vehicle.

Although many stakeholder pensions have been taken out, they have largely not been successful in encouraging lower earners to save more. The UK government announced in May 2006 that it proposed to introduce a new type of low-fee pension scheme called a Personal Account, which was renamed National Employment Savings Trust (NEST) prior to its introduction under the Pensions Act 2008.

== Description ==
A stakeholder pension is a money purchase pension provided by a bank, building society, insurance company or trade union. The holder makes payments (usually on a regular basis) which the provider invests on their behalf. Later in life, the accumulated fund can be accessed in the same way as other types of pension.

Employees can make contributions up to 100% of their salary, up to a maximum of £60,000 per year. People who are not earning can contribute up to £3,600 each year. Tax relief is given in the same way as other personal pension contributions.

== See also ==
- Pensions in the United Kingdom
- Personal pension schemes
