= Vertiq Hospitality Partners =

Vertiq Hospitality Partners B.V.
- Company type: Private
- Industry: Hospitality
- Founded: 2008; 18 years ago
- Headquarters: Houthavens, Amsterdam, The Netherlands
- Number of locations: 35 hotels 6,000 Rooms (Oct 2023)
- Key people: Erik Jacobs (CEO)
- Products: Hotels
- Website: vertiqhospitality.com

Vertiq Hospitality Partners B.V. is a hotel and asset management company based in Amsterdam, in the Netherlands. The group operates over 35 hotels across Europe, in eight countries, including the UK, the Netherlands, Belgium, Luxembourg, France and Switzerland. Formerly known as Cycas Hospitality B.V., the company rebranded as Vertiq Hospitality Partners in March 2026.

== History ==
The company was founded in 2008 by John Wagner and Eduard Elias. In October 2017, the Thai family-owned Hua Kee Group acquired one third of the group for an undisclosed amount. In 2019, Matt Luscombe became the company's first official CEO. The CEO as of March 2026 is Erik Jacobs.

== Types of hotels ==
Vertiq Hospitality Partners operates more than 6,000 rooms across Europe, in the extended-stay and mainstream hospitality sectors, including double-decker hotels, property development and asset management. Properties under management range from limited service to luxury, and include lifestyle and extended stay hotels as well as co-living and serviced apartments. Its global hospitality partners include InterContinental Hotels Group, Marriott International, Hyatt, Accor, Radisson Hotels and Hilton Hotels and Resorts.

== Awards ==
Vertiq continues to win industry awards, including best employer, ranking in the Best Places to Work in Hospitality for over five consecutive years.

The company has also been recognised for its leadership and its hotels' service levels.
