= Small Self Administered Scheme =

Small Self Administered Scheme (SSAS) is a type of UK Occupational Pension Scheme.

Schemes are trust-based and established individually, usually by directors of limited companies for specified employees of the company. Since Pension Simplification (also known as A-Day), SSAS has been available for establishment by those who are not in a limited company (i.e. Partnerships and Families).

== Tax relief ==
SSAS registered with HMRC may enjoy tax-exempt status, all investments made will be free of Capital Gains Tax, and contributions to the SSAS will receive tax-relief (if contributions are made by a "Relevant UK Individual"). Basic rate tax relief can be claimed by the SSAS itself, and any higher rate tax would be claimed through the member's tax return. However, the vast majority of SSAS do not reclaim tax on members contributions as this would require the scheme Trustee / Administrator applying for Relief at Source via HMRC.

The sponsoring employer can also pay contributions to the scheme and may obtain tax relief on the contributions.

Tax relief on personal contributions is calculated at the person's marginal rate of income tax, and for company contributions it is calculated as the company's marginal rate of corporation tax. Third party contributions may be made in some circumstances.

== Ownership ==
Provided that the members of the SSAS pension scheme are also trustees, there is a lesser regulatory requirement than if all members were not trustees. This is because the members of the SSAS pension scheme are deemed to be investing the funds for themselves.

The trustees can invest the funds as they consider appropriate to the needs of the SSAS pension scheme. For example, the trustees can invest the assets of the pension scheme in the company that sponsors the SSAS pension scheme – a process known as pension-led funding. This can take the form of loans to the employer and the purchase of shares in the sponsor, however, there are limits that apply. One must be very careful purchasing shares in the company through a SSAS, 'Taxable moveable property' laws can easily be breached. Guidance from the SSAS Practitioner or Administrator is required.

SSAS are suited to groups of individuals who run a common businesses and wish to have complete control over the pension fund. The costs per member are usually lower than using individual SIPPs to pool funds to purchase commercial property. SIPPs do not have the facility to loan funds to associated or unassociated employers. There is no requirement for a professional to be appointed to the scheme, however, the rules are complex and may well prove difficult for individuals without experience running SSAS.

The Trustees may wish to appoint a professional company to assist with the management of the scheme. This company may operate as SSAS Practitioner or as the Scheme Administrator. They both carry out the tax returns and other such submissions to HMRC and the Regulator. If the scheme returns are not correctly undertaken a penalty can be assessed against the trustees of the pension scheme

If a scheme Administrator is appointed to run the scheme, they are usually co-signatory on the scheme's investments. A SSAS Practitioner will not be co-signatory, this leads to Trustees and beneficiaries of the scheme having far greater control over their pension assets and enables the scheme to run more efficiently.

== Investment choice ==
The investments allowable for a SSAS are very similar to a SIPP. The Trustees of the SSAS may make choices about what assets are bought, leased or sold, and decide when those assets are acquired or disposed of, subject to the unanimous agreement of all trustees.

The range of assets permitted by HMRC includes :

- Equities regardless of whether or not they are quoted on a recognised stock exchange and regardless of whether the company is a UK company or an overseas company
- Futures and options traded on recognised futures exchange
- Authorised UK unit trusts and OEICs and other UCITS funds
- Unauthorised unit trusts that don't invest in residential property
- Investment trusts subject to FCA regulation
- Unitised insurance funds from EU insurers and IPAs
- Intangible assets such as intellectual property (IP)
- Deposits and deposit interests
- Commercial property (inc. hotel rooms, with certain restrictions)
- Traded endowment policies
- Derivative products such as a Contract for difference (CFD)
- Gold bullion, which is specifically allowed for in legislation

Investments currently permitted by primary legislation but subsequently made subject to heavy tax penalties include :

- Any item of tangible moveable property (whose market value does not exceed £6,000) - subject to further conditions on use of property
- other exotic assets like vintage cars, wine, stamps and art
- Residential property

== Benefit rules ==
The pension benefits payable include a tax free cash sum from age 55/57; plus a pension income paid from the pension scheme. On death the benefits may be paid out to beneficiaries, special rules apply on death after age 75. There is no requirement to purchase an annuity. http://www.hmrc.gov.uk/manuals/rpsmmanual/rpsm09100300.htm
