= Nigel Wilson (businessman) =

Businessperson

Sir Nigel Wilson
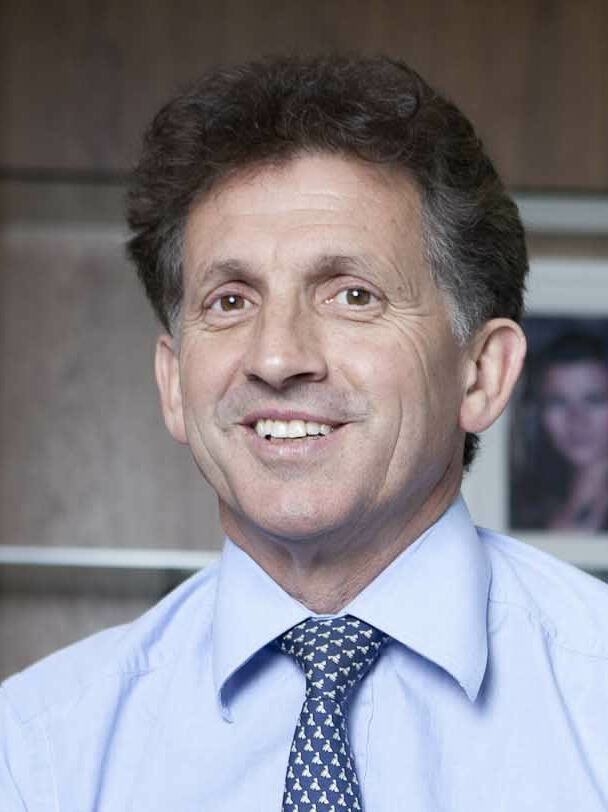
- Born: 17 November 1956 (age 69); Norwich, England
- Education: University of Essex; Massachusetts Institute of Technology
- Occupation: Businessman
- Years active: 1977–present
- Title: Chairman, Canary Wharf Group
- Children: 5

Sir Nigel David Wilson (born 17 November 1956) is a British businessman. He was the group chief executive of Legal & General from 2012 to 2023. In 2024, he joined the Canary Wharf Group as chairman.

== Early life ==
Wilson was born in Norwich and grew up in Darlington. He attended Ferryhill Grammar School. He went on to earn a degree in economics from the University of Essex and a PhD from the Massachusetts Institute of Technology.

== Career ==
Wilson was the chief executive of Legal & General Group from 30 June 2012 to 31 December 2023, having joined as group chief financial officer on 1 September 2009. He was knighted in the 2022 New Year Honours for services to the finance industry and regional development.

In September 2022, Wilson turned down the position of Minister of State for Investment in the British government.

=== Media commentating ===
While he was chief executive of Legal & General, Wilson was often quoted in the media on a range of subjects, usually commenting about government policies which he perceived to be anti-business. His outspoken views led The Sunday Times to describe him as ‘Marmite’. Controversial opinions expressed by Wilson included several attempts to encourage the government to allow developers to build housing on Green Belt land.

He was also an outspoken critic of government environmental policy, commenting in relation to wind farms, "The government is deluding itself that it is saving the world with these ugly modern windmills." Wilson also claimed that Legal & General, one of the UK’s largest investors, "would not put a single penny into wind farms" (although several years later Legal & General in fact did invest circa £700m in large windfarm developments at Walney and Hornsea).

Wilson has made a number of outspoken political interventions, being described as ‘one of the highest profile supporters of Brexit in the Square Mile’. He also spoke in favour of Liz Truss’ controversial plans for widespread tax-cuts, plans which later played a major part in Truss' ill-fated mini-budget.

== Personal life ==
Wilson has five daughters. He has won several national masters athletics championships.
