= Self-invested personal pension =

Type of UK government-approved personal pension scheme

A self-invested personal pension (SIPP) is the name given to the type of UK government-registered personal pension scheme which allows individuals to make their own investment decisions from a wide range of investments by HM Revenue and Customs (HMRC).

SIPPs are "tax wrappers", allowing tax rebates on contributions in exchange for limits on accessibility. They allow investors to receive income tax relief on their contributions at their highest marginal tax rate, and any contributions from employers will reduce their corporate tax liability. The investments can grow tax-free, a lump sum can be taken by the investor tax-free on retirement, and SIPPs attract better inheritance tax treatment if the beneficiary dies before the age of 75.

The HMRC rules allow for a greater range of investments to be held than personal pension schemes, notably equities and property. Rules for contributions, benefit withdrawal etc. are the same as for other personal pension schemes. Another subset of this type of pension is the stakeholder pension scheme.

== History ==
The rules and conditions for a broader range of investments were originally set out in Joint Office Memorandum 101 issued by the UK's Inland Revenue in 1989. However, the first true SIPP was taken out in March 1990. James Hay Partnership, the parent company of then Personal Pension Management, offered the first SIPP product. The second SIPP provider followed quickly afterwards and was called Provident Life, launching its own version a few months later. All three companies were based in Salisbury, Wiltshire where James Hay Partnership remained one of the largest SIPP providers.

The Finance Act 2004 implemented wide-ranging changes to the UK pensions regime, most of which came into force on 6 April 2006 (also known as A-Day) and is commonly referred to as pension simplification.

== Structure ==
Unlike conventional personal pensions where the provider as trustee has ownership and control of the assets, in a SIPP the member may have ownership of the assets (via an individual trust) as long as the scheme administrator is a co-trustee to exercise control. In practice, most SIPPs do not work this way and simply have the provider as SIPP trustee.

The role of the scheme administrator in this situation is to control what is happening and to ensure that the requirements for tax approval continue to be met.

The pensions industry has gravitated towards four industry terms to describe generic SIPP types:

1. Deferred. This is effectively a personal pension scheme in which most or all of the pension assets are generally held in insured pension funds (although some providers will offer direct access to mutual funds). Self-investment or income withdrawal activity is deferred until an indeterminate date, and this gives rise to the name. In some newer schemes of this type, there are over a thousand fund options, so they are not as restrictive as they once were.
2. Hybrid. A scheme in which some of the assets must always be held in conventional insured pension funds, with the rest being able to be 'self-invested'. This has been a common offering from mainstream personal pension providers, who require insured funds in order to derive their product charges.
3. Pure or full. Schemes offer unrestricted access to many allowable investment asset classes.
4. SIPP Lite or Single Investment. A recent trend towards schemes that feature much lower fees for investments that are typically placed in only one asset. For these purposes, an investment platform or a stockbroker/discretionary fund manager account usually is classed as a single investment. An upgrade to a full SIPP in the future may be allowed, depending on the scheme.

== International SIPPs ==
International SIPPs have become popular for those with UK registered pensions that move abroad for a number of reasons-

1. They accept non-UK residents as investors (often SIPPs will not accept non-UK residents).
2. Since the abolition of the Lifetime Allowance Charge, there is often no need to move the pension to a QROPS.
3. Multi-currency options are available.
4. They allow suitably qualified non-UK advisers to provide non-UK residents with ongoing investment and financial advice that many UK pension providers will not allow. Typically, SIPP providers are insisting that the adviser holds at least an NVQ Level 4 financial qualification in order to recommend and sell International SIPPs.

While termed International SIPPs, they are all UK regulated registered pensions.

== Investment choice ==
Investors may make choices about what assets are bought, leased or sold, and decide when those assets are acquired or disposed of, subject to the agreement of the SIPP trustees (usually the SIPP provider).

All assets are permitted by HMRC, however some will be subject to tax charges. The assets that are not subject to a tax charge are:

- Stocks and shares listed on a recognised exchange
- Futures and options traded on a recognised futures exchange
- Authorised UK unit trusts and open-ended investment companies and other UCITS funds
- Unauthorised unit trusts that do not invest in residential property
- Unlisted shares
- Investment trusts subject to FCA regulation
- Unitised insurance funds from EU insurers and IPAs
- Deposits and deposit interests
- Commercial property (including hotel rooms)
- Ground rents (as long as they do not contain any element of residential property)
- Traded endowments policies
- Derivatives products such as a contract for difference (CFD)
- Gold bullion, which is specifically allowed for in legislation, provided it is "investment grade"

Investments currently permitted by primary legislation but subsequently made subject to heavy tax penalties (and therefore typically not allowed by SIPP providers) include:

- Any item of tangible movable property (whose market value does not exceed £6,000) – subject to further conditions on use of property
- "Exotic" assets like vintage cars, wine, stamps, and art
- Residential property

== Tax treatment ==
Contributions to SIPPs are treated identically to contributions to other types of personal pension. Contributions are limited to £3,600 (£2,880 before 20% tax refund) or 100% of earned income (if higher). The maximum was £255,000 for the 2010/11 tax year but the 'Annual Allowance' for all pension contributions was decreased to £50,000 for tax years 2012/13 and 2013/14, and was decreased further to £40,000 starting with the 2014/15 tax year. The current annual allowance is £60,000. The SIPP provider claims a tax refund at the basic rate on behalf of the customer (i.e. you pay £2,880 and your fund contribution for the year will become £3,600). The 20% is usually added to the 'pot' some 6–11 weeks after your payment is made. Higher rate and additional rate taxpayers must claim any additional tax refund through their tax return if they have one, or by otherwise contacting HMRC (being a higher rate taxpayer, being self-employed or having paid too much tax, are all triggers for being requested to complete a tax return). Employer contributions are usually allowable against corporation tax or income tax.

Income from assets within the scheme is untaxed (although prior to the abolition of UK Dividend Tax Credit in April 2016, those credits could not be reclaimed). Growth is free from capital gains tax (CGT).

At any time after the SIPP holder reaches early retirement age (55 from April 2010) they may elect to take a pension from some or all of their fund. After taking up to 25% as a tax-free Pension Commencement Lump Sum, the remaining money can either be moved into 'drawdown' (where it remains invested) or used to purchase an annuity. Drawdown income may be "capped", typically limited to that obtainable with an annuity according to the Government Actuary's Department (GAD). This is reviewed every three years until age 75 and annually thereafter. This limit does not apply to plan holders in "Flexi Access Drawdown", who may take any amount from their fund from age 55. Pension income is taxed as if it is earned income at the member's highest marginal rate.

Following its announcement in 2014, this measure increases the normal minimum pension age (NMPA), which is the minimum age at which most pension savers can access their pensions without incurring an unauthorised payments tax charge unless they are retiring due to ill-health, from age 55 to 57 in April 2028.

Rules exist to prevent the Pension Commencement Lump Sum being recycled back into the SIPP (and neither drawdown nor annuity payments count as earned income for the purpose of making SIPP contributions).

SIPPs can borrow up to 50% of the net value of the pension fund to invest in any assets.

SIPPS were subject to the Lifetime Allowance (LTA) rules, which imposed a tax charge when an individual's total lifetime benefits from all types of pension exceeded a certain limit, until the LTA was abolished in April 2024. Alongside other types of pension, tax-free lump sums from SIPPs then became capped by the Lump Sum Allowance and the Lump Sum and Death Benefit Allowance, but subject to transitional arrangements.

== See also ==
- Individual savings account
