= Guaranteed Minimum Pension =

Minimum occupational pension for certain contracted-out UK service

The Guaranteed Minimum Pension (GMP) is the minimum pension which a United Kingdom occupational pension scheme has to provide for those employees who were contracted out of the State Earnings-Related Pension Scheme (SERPS) between 6 April 1978 and 5 April 1997. Contracting out meant building replacement earnings-related pension rights in an occupational or personal pension instead of through the state for those years. The amount is said to be 'broadly equivalent' to the amount the member would have received had they not been contracted out.

Originally, when the GMP became payable at State Pension Age, the cost-of-living increases associated with this element of a member's pension were paid by the state with the individual's state pension. With regard to any GMP accrued from 6 April 1988, the occupational pension scheme is required to pay increases in line with the Consumer Price Index up to a maximum of 3%. The change in rules led to a distinction between Pre 1988 GMP and Post 1988 GMP.

With effect from 6 April 1997, Guaranteed Minimum Pensions no longer accrued and the system was replaced by the Reference Scheme Test. Because GMPs were originally calculated on different bases for men and women, pension schemes have been required to address resulting inequalities. Legislation allows schemes to convert GMPs into other scheme benefits as one method of doing so.

== Background and contracting out ==
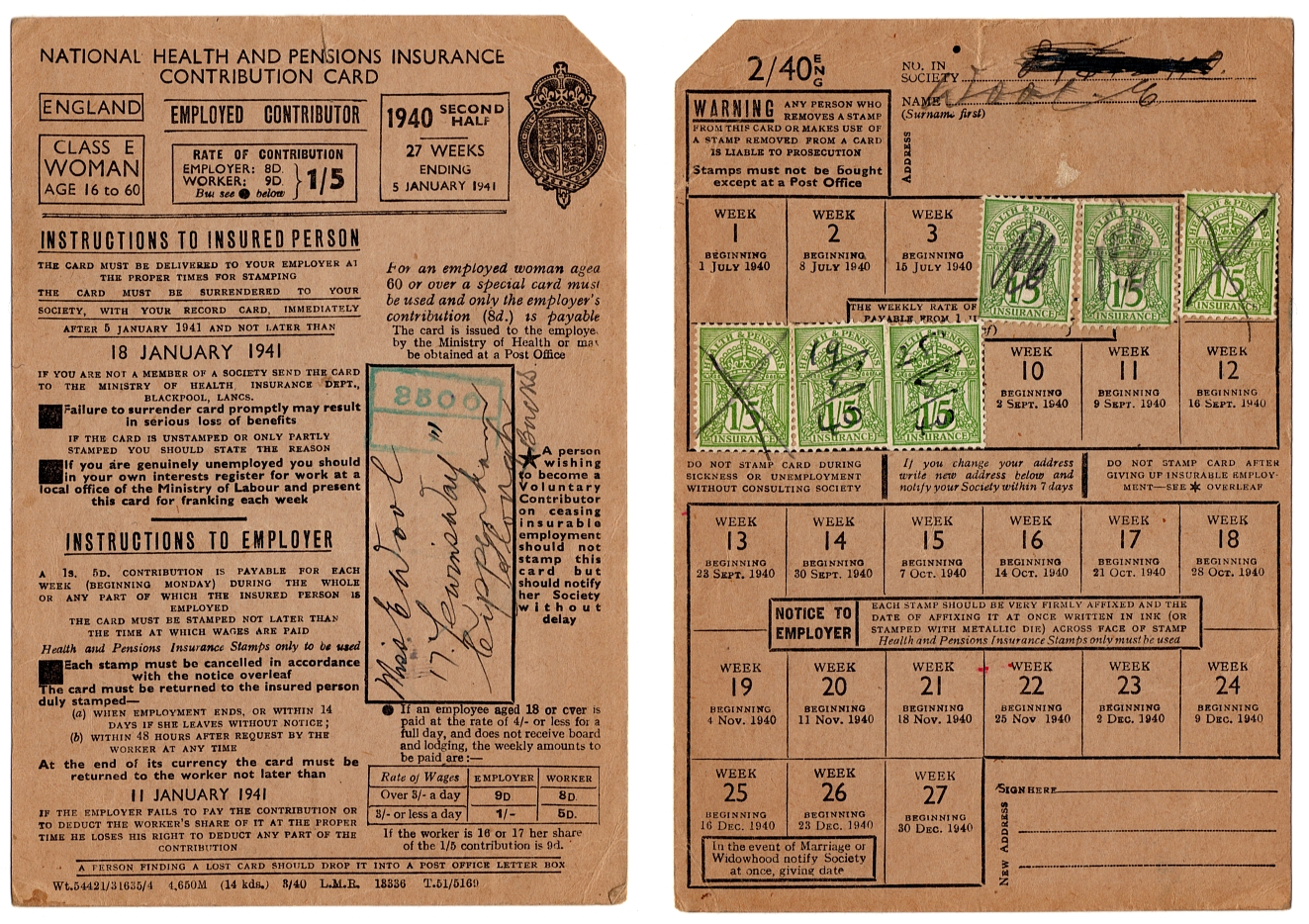
A British National Insurance contribution card (1940). National Insurance records underpin State Pension entitlement and were used in contracted-out calculations.

From 1978, employees accrued an earnings-related Additional State Pension through SERPS, later the State Second Pension. Under rules in place before 6 April 2016, employers and, in some cases, individuals could contract out so that additional State Pension entitlement for those years was instead built up in a workplace or private pension. While contracted out, some National Insurance contributions were reduced or redirected to the pension arrangement.

Between 6 April 1978 and 5 April 1997, contracting out through a contracted-out salary-related (COSR) defined benefit occupational scheme required the scheme to provide a GMP for the member's contracted-out service, intended to replace the Additional State Pension that would otherwise have accrued for those years.

From 1988–89, employees could contract out by joining an appropriate personal pension or a contracted-out money purchase scheme. In these cases, the arrangement provided benefits described in legislation and guidance as protected rights, and the level of benefits was not guaranteed in the same way as a GMP in a COSR defined benefit scheme.

Contracting out required the employer and scheme to meet statutory conditions and hold a contracting-out certificate issued by HM Revenue and Customs. Contracting out ended with the introduction of the new State Pension on 6 April 2016, and existing contracting-out certificates were automatically cancelled.

== Calculation and revaluation ==
A GMP is calculated for a member's contracted-out service between 6 April 1978 and 5 April 1997 using earnings factors derived from National Insurance records. For 6 April 1987 to 5 April 1997, earnings factors are based on the member's contracted-out earnings between the lower and upper earnings limits. For earlier tax years up to and including 1986–87, contracted-out National Insurance contributions are converted into earnings factors using an HMRC formula.

The statutory calculation uses the member's "working life", from 6 April 1978 (or, if later, the 6 April on or immediately before the member's 16th birthday) to the 5 April before GMP payable age, which is age 60 for women and 65 for men. The weekly GMP is calculated separately for GMP earned before 6 April 1988 and GMP earned from 6 April 1988, using different statutory accrual rates of 25% and 20% respectively, with the pre-1988 and post-1988 amounts rounded separately and then added together.

Before the weekly GMP is calculated, earnings factors are revalued in line with average earnings using the annual Social Security Revaluation of Earnings Factors Order made under section 148 of the Social Security Administration Act 1992. This revaluation updates historic earnings factors as part of calculating a first award of GMP at GMP payable age and for early leavers.

Where a member leaves pensionable service before GMP payable age, the scheme must revalue the accrued GMP up to GMP payable age, or to an earlier date where a current GMP figure is needed, such as for a transfer value or pension sharing orders. Statutory revaluation for early leavers can be provided by revaluing earnings factors under section 148 orders (full revaluation) or by applying fixed rate revaluation. For members whose contracted-out employment ended before 6 April 1997, limited rate revaluation may still apply where the scheme uses that method.

== Increases in payment ==
Pension schemes are required to provide annual increases on GMP accrued between 6 April 1988 and 5 April 1997 in line with prices, capped at 3%, and the percentage is specified each year in a Guaranteed Minimum Pensions Increase Order. There is no statutory requirement for schemes to increase GMP accrued between 6 April 1978 and 5 April 1988.

For people who reached State Pension age before 6 April 2016, increases not paid by the pension scheme could be reflected through the Additional State Pension paid by the government. For people reaching State Pension age on or after 6 April 2016, the introduction of the new State Pension removed this mechanism, so increases on GMP in payment depend on the scheme's statutory and scheme-rule obligations.

=== Illustrative breakdown and increases ===
Defined benefit schemes that were contracted out commonly record a member's pension in payment as a GMP element plus any pension above that amount. The pension above the GMP is often described as the excess and is provided under the scheme's own rules.

The statutory responsibility for annual increases depends on when the GMP was built up. Schemes must provide price-linked increases (capped at 3%) on GMP accrued from 6 April 1988 to 5 April 1997, while there is no statutory requirement for schemes to increase GMP accrued from 6 April 1978 to 5 April 1988. Before 6 April 2016, where a scheme did not provide the full increase on a member's GMP, the increase could be reflected through the Additional State Pension. This mechanism does not apply for people who reach State Pension age on or after 6 April 2016.

Illustrative breakdown used by schemes
Component	What it represents
Excess pension	Pension above the member's GMP, provided under scheme rules
Pre-1988 GMP	GMP accrued between 6 April 1978 and 5 April 1988
Post-1988 GMP	GMP accrued between 6 April 1988 and 5 April 1997

Responsibility for increases on pension components
Component	Statutory scheme increase	State mechanism (State Pension age before 6 April 2016)	Position for State Pension age on or after 6 April 2016
Excess pension	Depends on scheme rules	Not applicable	Depends on scheme rules
Pre-1988 GMP	No statutory requirement	Increase could be reflected through the Additional State Pension	No state mechanism for GMP increases
Post-1988 GMP	Prices, capped at 3% and specified in the annual Increase Order	Increase above the scheme cap could be reflected through the Additional State Pension	No state mechanism for GMP increases

The Department for Work and Pensions gives an illustrative example of how scheme and state increases could interact under the pre-2016 system. For example, where a person's weekly GMP is £35 and prices increase by 2%, the total increase is 70p per week. If the scheme pays 50p, the remaining 20p could be reflected through the Additional State Pension for a person who reached State Pension age before 6 April 2016.

== End of accrual and post-1997 position ==
GMPs stopped accruing for new contracted-out service after 5 April 1997, when the statutory basis for contracting out through salary-related occupational schemes changed. From 6 April 1997, contracted-out salary-related schemes no longer had to provide a GMP for new service and instead had to meet a scheme-based standard of benefits under the reference scheme test (RST). Past GMP accruals remain subject to the GMP rules, and schemes that were contracted out under the pre-1997 GMP framework must still provide benefits at least as good as the GMP for contracted-out service between 6 April 1978 and 5 April 1997.

The RST operated for defined benefit schemes contracting out from 6 April 1997 until contracting out ended on 5 April 2016. It was intended to provide pensions broadly equivalent to the additional State Pension rights given up by contracting out, but on a scheme-wide basis rather than by setting an individual GMP for each member. Benefits accrued after 1997 under a scheme contracted out under the RST are commonly referred to as section 9(2B) rights. They are distinct from GMPs accrued before 6 April 1997 and are subject to their own statutory protections and scheme rules.

Contracting out on a defined contribution basis, which operated through money purchase contracted-out schemes and appropriate personal pensions, continued after 1997 but was abolished from 6 April 2012. Following abolition, funds that had been treated as protected rights ceased to have that separate status and the associated special restrictions were removed.

Contracting out ended altogether with the introduction of the new State Pension from 6 April 2016. Occupational pension schemes remain responsible for administering benefits built up during contracted-out periods, including GMPs for service before 6 April 1997 and post-1997 contracted-out scheme rights accrued under the RST framework.

== Changes with the new State Pension from 2016 ==
The new State Pension was introduced from 6 April 2016 as a single-tier payment, replacing the previous structure of a basic State Pension and an earnings-related Additional State Pension. Contracting out ended on 5 April 2016, contracting-out certificates were automatically cancelled, and contracted-out employees and employers began paying National Insurance contributions at the standard rate.

Transitional rules were applied to National Insurance records built up to the end of the 2015–16 tax year. The Department for Work and Pensions calculated a starting amount at April 2016 by comparing an amount based on the pre-2016 rules with an amount based on the new State Pension rules, and using the higher figure as the starting point for future entitlement. Periods of contracted-out employment are reflected in both calculations. Under the pre-2016 rules, entitlement to the Additional State Pension is reduced by a contracted-out deduction (COD). For salary-related contracted-out service between 6 April 1978 and 5 April 1997, the COD reflects the value of the GMP the member built up for that period. For people contracted out into defined contribution arrangements, the COD is calculated on the basis of a notional GMP as if they had been contracted out on a salary-related basis.

Department for Work and Pensions statements and forecasts may also show an estimated Contracted-out Pension Equivalent (COPE) for people who were contracted out. COPE is based on National Insurance records and is intended to indicate the amount of pension expected to be provided by workplace or personal pension arrangements for periods spent contracted out. COPE is not paid by the state and does not by itself reduce the amount of new State Pension a person can receive, since the effect of contracting out is already reflected in the calculation of the starting amount and subsequent entitlement.

For people reaching State Pension age on or after 6 April 2016, the closure of the Additional State Pension ended the mechanism by which the state could reflect cost-of-living increases on GMP that were not paid by the pension scheme. Increases on GMP in payment therefore depend on the scheme's statutory and scheme-rule obligations, as well as any subsequent adjustments made by the scheme.

== Public service pension schemes ==
For some members of public service pension schemes who were contracted out between 6 April 1978 and 5 April 1997, part of their scheme pension may include a GMP element. Before 6 April 2016, increases on GMP not paid by the scheme could be reflected through the Additional State Pension, and this interaction was part of how price protection operated for some public service pensioners with GMPs.

When the new State Pension was introduced from 6 April 2016, it removed the Additional State Pension mechanism. The government implemented an interim approach under which public service pension schemes provided full indexation for affected members reaching State Pension age during a defined period. Following consultation, the interim approach was extended to cover members reaching State Pension age on or before 5 April 2021.

In March 2021, the government published its response to the 2020 consultation and decided to discount conversion as a long-term policy solution and make full GMP indexation the permanent approach for public service pension schemes. This meant schemes would provide full indexation for members with a GMP reaching State Pension age after 5 April 2021.

== Reconciliation ==
HM Revenue and Customs (HMRC) holds records of contracted-out service and GMP amounts that support State Pension and scheme administration. Pension schemes may need to reconcile their own membership and GMP records against HMRC data where differences exist, to help ensure that GMP-related benefits and the application of increases are correct.

HMRC operated the Scheme Reconciliation Service (SRS) to help administrators compare scheme-held data with HMRC-held data for contracted-out periods and GMP figures, including output from a one-off "closure scan" for active members whose contracted-out records needed to be closed at the end of contracting out. Administrators generally had to register for SRS by 5 April 2016. HMRC set deadlines for submitting SRS queries and issued final scans of HMRC-held membership data to schemes when the service closed.

After SRS ended, HMRC continued to provide GMP information to schemes through its online GMP checking service, and it limited changes to records and query handling to specified circumstances, such as when a "life event" occurs.

== Equalisation and conversion ==
GMP rules originally reflected different State Pension ages and related assumptions for men and women. This meant that, even where a scheme's main benefits were otherwise equalised, the GMP element could lead to different overall pension outcomes for members with comparable service histories. The key period for GMP equalisation is generally taken as service from 17 May 1990, the date of the Barber equal treatment judgment on occupational pensions, up to 5 April 1997 when GMP accrual ended.

In October 2018, the High Court in Lloyds Banking Group Pensions Trustees Ltd v Lloyds Bank plc held that occupational pension schemes are under a duty to equalise benefits for the effect of unequal GMPs and that trustees must amend scheme benefits so that outcomes for men and women are equal for the relevant period. The court indicated that there could be more than one lawful way to achieve equalisation, and later decisions in the same proceedings considered practical and legal questions that arose when implementing equalisation, including issues linked to GMP conversion and transfers out.

There is no single prescribed method for equalising for the effect of unequal GMPs. Approaches used by schemes include comparing the total pension payable to a member on a sex-by-sex basis and paying the higher amount, and converting GMP rights into other scheme benefits so that future benefits can be provided on an equalised basis, subject to meeting statutory conditions.

The main statutory framework for GMP conversion is in sections 24A to 24H of the Pension Schemes Act 1993, which allow schemes to convert GMP rights into other scheme benefits subject to safeguards. The Pension Schemes (Conversion of Guaranteed Minimum Pensions) Act 2022 amended the conversion framework, including changes intended to reduce uncertainty about how conversion can be carried out as part of equalisation.

Equalisation can affect members who transferred their benefits out of a scheme. In November 2020, the High Court considered how GMP equalisation interacts with historic statutory cash equivalent transfer values, and held that, in relevant cases, a scheme could be required to make a further payment to reflect the member's entitlement to equalised benefits. HMRC guidance on GMP equalisation has addressed the tax treatment of top-up transfer payments and related adjustments.

== Anti-franking ==
In the context of GMPs, anti-franking refers to statutory protections intended to prevent a pension scheme from offsetting increases in a member's GMP (including revaluation during deferment) against other scheme benefits, such as pension in excess of the GMP. The rules are set out in Part IV, Chapter III of the Pension Schemes Act 1993 and apply where there is an interval between the end of contracted-out employment and the date the GMP comes into payment, and the member had scheme benefits above the GMP at the end of that employment.

Where the conditions are met, the Act requires the pension payable from the scheme at and after GMP payable age to be at least a statutory minimum determined by reference to the member's benefits at the end of contracted-out employment (the "relevant sum") and the amount by which the GMP has increased between the end of contracted-out employment and the date the GMP starts to be paid.

HMRC guidance describes this as preventing GMP revaluation from eroding the part of the pension that exceeds the GMP, and notes that it can apply to members with a preserved GMP who leave before scheme pension age, and where a scheme has a pension age below GMP payable age and the member defers retirement beyond GMP payable age.

The legislation provides for parallel protection in relation to certain survivor pensions where the survivor pension in excess of the GMP would otherwise be eroded by GMP increases in the interval before the GMP comes into payment.

Following the end of salary-related contracting out on 6 April 2016, HMRC guidance describes the anti-franking conditions by reference to the point at which a member ceases to be in pensionable service in a former contracted-out salary-related scheme, rather than the end of contracted-out employment.

Department for Work and Pensions guidance on GMP conversion notes that schemes using conversion as part of equalisation should ensure that benefits continue to satisfy anti-franking requirements where relevant.

== Timeline ==
Date	Change
6 April 1978	SERPS introduced and GMP accrual begins for contracted-out salary-related schemes.
6 April 1988	Statutory scheme increases begin for GMP accrued from 6 April 1988, subject to the annual Increase Order and the 3% cap.
17 May 1990	The Barber judgment establishes the equal treatment principle for occupational pensions, forming the starting point for the GMP equalisation period used in later guidance and litigation.
5 April 1997	Last day on which GMP could accrue for contracted-out defined benefit service.
6 April 1997	Salary-related contracting out continues under the reference scheme test framework, rather than by providing a GMP for new service.
6 April 2012	Contracting out on a defined contribution basis is abolished and "protected rights" cease to have separate status for most purposes.
6 April 2016	Contracting out ends and the new State Pension starts.
26 October 2018	High Court judgment in Lloyds confirms schemes must equalise benefits for the effect of unequal GMPs.
20 November 2020	High Court considers GMP equalisation and historic transfers out in Lloyds and holds that, in relevant cases, a further payment may be required to reflect equalised benefits.
5 April 2021	End date of the interim GMP indexation approach for affected public service pension members reaching State Pension age on or before this date.
28 April 2022	Pension Schemes (Conversion of Guaranteed Minimum Pensions) Act 2022 receives Royal Assent.

== Example ==
This worked example shows how schemes may describe a pension that includes GMP and how different statutory increase rules can apply to different components.

Mr Jones was a member of his occupational pension scheme between 1980 and 1995 and was entitled to a pension of £500 per month on retirement. Because he was contracted out of SERPS, he had a GMP of £110 per month, of which £50 related to GMP accrued from 6 April 1988. The pension above the GMP, £390 per month, is often described as the excess.

Mr Jones' monthly pension at retirement
Tranche	Pension per month
Excess pension	£390.00
Pre-1988 GMP	£60.00
Post-1988 GMP	£50.00
Total	£500.00

Different increase rules can apply to different elements. Suppose the scheme rules provide fixed annual increases of 3% and, over the same year, the Retail Prices Index (RPI) increases by 4.5%. The scheme would pay an additional £11.70 in respect of the excess pension (3% of £390.00) and nothing on the pre-1988 GMP, while it would pay £1.50 on the post-1988 GMP (3% of £50.00). Under the pre-2016 State Pension system, the member's total GMP increase could be reflected through the Additional State Pension, so the increase on the GMP at 4.5% is £4.95 (4.5% of £110.00). The difference between the total GMP increase and the increase paid by the scheme, £3.45 (£4.95 minus £1.50), could be reflected through the Additional State Pension for a person who reached State Pension age before 6 April 2016.

Worked example of annual increases
Component	Previous year	Increase from scheme	Increase from state	New pension
Excess pension	£390.00	£11.70	£0.00	£401.70
Pre-1988 GMP	£60.00	£0.00	£2.70	£62.70
Post-1988 GMP	£50.00	£1.50	£0.75	£52.25
Total	£500.00	£13.20	£3.45	£516.65

GMPs stopped accruing for new service after 5 April 1997 and, from 6 April 1997, salary-related contracting out continued under the reference scheme test framework rather than by providing a GMP for each member for new accrual. Schemes remain responsible for providing at least the GMP for relevant contracted-out service between 6 April 1978 and 5 April 1997.

== See also ==
- Old Age Security
- Pensions in the United Kingdom
- State Pension (United Kingdom)
- State Earnings-Related Pension Scheme
- State Second Pension
- Barber v Guardian Royal Exchange Assurance Group
