= Women Against State Pension Inequality =

British political advocacy group started in 2015

- Abbreviation: WASPI
- Founded: 2015
- Purpose: Campaigning for compensation for women adversely affected by the decision to stop paying state pensions to women earlier than men
- Location: United Kingdom
- Website: waspi.co.uk

Women Against State Pension Inequality (WASPI) is a voluntary UK-based organisation founded in 2015 that campaigns against the way in which the state pension ages for men and women were equalised. Previously, women received a pension five years earlier than men. It is argued that the change was badly communicated, and there have been calls for compensation for the millions of women adversely affected by the change to equal pension ages.

== History ==
The 1995 Pensions Act increased the state pension age for women from 60 to 65 in order to equalise the age with men, with the change to be phased in over ten years from 2010 for women born between 1950 and 1955. This transition was later sped up by the 2011 Pensions Act. Both the 1995 and 2011 changes affected 3.6 million women who then had to wait up to six years longer for their state pension, potentially affecting their retirement plans. In 2015, WASPI was formed by five women to argue for the government to provide transitional payments to women born in the 1950s receiving their pension after the age of 60. They also call for compensation to women who now receive a state pension but had to wait longer.

Three of the five original founders stepped down as leaders after a split in August 2016. A further three directors resigned in February 2018 following an emergency board meeting held the previous month where irreconcilable differences led to the resignations.

An editorial in The Times described the group's name as an "apparently non-ironic choice of title despite their campaign against the equalisation of their own state pension ages with those of men", and argued that the equalisation was "unusually good policy making". The Spectator suggested "'Women Against State Pension Equality' would be a more appropriate name for the group".

== Actions ==
WASPI's online petition to Parliament received 141,000 signatures resulting in a parliamentary debate on the issue of the changes to the state pension age.

WASPI crowdfunded £100,000 to pay for legal action in order to challenge these changes. The money was used to take legal advice and on 8 March 2017, the group wrote to the Department for Work and Pensions threatening legal action if the government did not help lessen the impact on the affected women. This move coincided with International Women's Day and a march in London that many WASPI members attended.

The organisation also has a number of groups across the country who campaign locally, including by asking their constituency MPs to sign the WASPI pledge.

== Government responses ==
Since the launch of WASPI, the issue of the state pension age has become more prominent, leading to its discussion in a number of parliamentary debates. The issue played an important part in the 2017 general election with Labour's Jeremy Corbyn raising it in a session of Prime Minister's Questions and the SNP pledging to support the women. However, the Conservative government rejected the calls of WASPI, arguing that they had to make the state pension more affordable for taxpayers and requiring men to work longer than women by 5–7 years was grossly unfair and potentially illegal. Furthermore, the WASPI campaign has been criticised by some commentators who said that the change equalised pension ages and the claims of WASPI campaigners to the contrary is both sexist and unfounded.

On 23 November 2019, Labour Party shadow chancellor John McDonnell pledged £58 billion to compensate all women born in the 1950s whose pension age was increased by the Pensions Act 1995. The Institute of Fiscal Studies was particularly critical of this policy, announced after the manifesto, as compensating people who were "relatively well off on average" and would result in public finances going off target.

In a report in March 2024, the Parliamentary and Health Service Ombudsman considered in detail the experience of six women – "sample complainants" – selected to represent the range of issues women had complained to the ombudsman about. The Ombudsman found that the sample complainants should receive between £1,000 and £2,950 compensation for maladministration as a result of the Department for Work and Pensions' failure to heed its own research showing that public campaigns were not reaching enough affected women, and found that individual letters should have been sent by it to affected women between 2007 and 2012. The Ombudsman noted that some women were aware of the increase to pension age as a result of the public campaigns, and that older women's pension ages were increased by less. He also noted that compensation for affected women could either be assessed individually or by a flat payment. The Ombudsman stated that "the Department must do the right thing and it must be held to account for failure to do so".

On 17 December 2024 the Labour government rejected the recommendation of the Ombudsman with the minister for work and pensions, Liz Kendall, stating that there was no evidence of "direct financial loss" and no financial compensation pay-out would be made to the WASPI women.

On 12 November 2025, the Work and Pensions Secretary, Pat McFadden pledged that the decision not to award compensation to women affected by the rise in state pension age will be reviewed after new evidence had come to light. The government also stated they will withdraw from the judicial review brought by WASPI due to begin in December 2025, while the evidence is reviewed.

On 25 June 2026 the government decided against financial compensation for those affected, saying that it would be "neither fair nor feasible and would not represent good value for taxpayers".
