= Christmas bonus (United Kingdom) =

British custom of giving a bonus around Christmas time

Many employers in the UK provide a Christmas bonus to their staff. Amounts vary widely, and may be supplemented by gifts from customers, known as Christmas boxes, usually paid direct. Some employers provide an annual bonus at other times of the year. Bonuses may be nominal, based on performance, or a thirteenth salary type scheme.

== Benefit recipients ==
A Christmas bonus of £10 is paid to the recipients of long-term benefit in the United Kingdom.

This was established by the Pensioners and Family Income Supplement Payments Act 1972 as a one-off payment which was repeated by the Heath government in 1973 and 1974. It was then repeated by the Labour Government in 1977 and 1978. The subsequent Pensioners' Payments and Social Security Act of 1979 established it permanently, although the amount has never been uprated.

If the government had increased it to keep pace with inflation (and so keep a constant real value) it would be £119.47 in 2025.

To qualify a person must be present or ‘ordinarily resident’ in the UK, Channel Islands, Isle of Man, Gibraltar, any European Economic Area country, or Switzerland during the qualifying week, normally the first full week of December, and get at least one of the following benefits in that week:

- Armed Forces Independence Payment
- Attendance Allowance
- Carer's allowance
- Constant Attendance Allowance (paid under Industrial Injuries or War Pensions schemes)
- Contribution-based Employment and Support Allowance (once the main phase of the benefit is entered after the first 13 weeks of claim)
- Disability Living Allowance
- Incapacity Benefit at the long-term rate
- Industrial Death Benefit (for widows or widowers)
- Mobility Supplement
- Pension Credit - the guarantee element
- Personal Independence Payment
- State Pension (including Graduated Retirement Benefit)
- Severe Disablement Allowance (transitionally protected)
- Unemployability Supplement or Allowance (paid under Industrial Injuries or War Pensions schemes)
- War Disablement Pension at State Pension age
- War Widow’s Pension
- Widowed Mother’s Allowance
- Widowed Parent’s Allowance
- Widow’s Pension

The list of qualifying benefits has been extended since the benefit was first introduced.
