= Child Maintenance Options =

UK information and support service

Child Maintenance Options is an information and support service that gives free and impartial help to separating or separated parents in Great Britain so they can make informed choices about child maintenance.

The service discusses the different options available to separated and separating families regarding child maintenance.

== About the service ==
Child Maintenance Options gives separated parents the information they need to put in place the maintenance agreement most suited to their needs. This could be a family-based arrangement (also called private agreement), an arrangement made under the UK government’s statutory child maintenance scheme (currently managed by the Child Maintenance Service) or one enforced by a court Consent Order (or Minute of Agreement in Scotland).

It also has a variety of tools on its website to help separated parents make family-based arrangements. These include a discussion guide, a family-based arrangement pack, video case studies from parents who have used the service and a range of leaflets.

The service can also give customers an estimated calculation of the amount of maintenance that would be payable if they used the Child Maintenance Service. The estimate is based on the Child Maintenance Service’s own formula, which takes account of factors like shared care, income and other children. Parents can use their estimate as the basis for working out an appropriate maintenance amount between themselves. The service also has an online child maintenance calculator that anyone can use.

The service also helps with a range of wider separation issues like housing, childcare, legal issues and debt and has links to other organisations and support services that it recommends to customers.

As well as separated and separating parents, the service is available to grandparents and other relatives and friends of separated families, people with a professional interest in finding out more about child maintenance, and others.

== History of Child Maintenance Options ==
In July 2006, Sir David Henshaw reported on his findings following the fundamental review of the UK’s child support systems that he had carried out over the previous six months.

One of the Henshaw Report’s recommendations was that any government strategy on child support should include as one of its key principles the provision of information and support to help parents meet their child maintenance responsibilities.

The Child Maintenance and Enforcement Commission was established in 2008 and is currently responsible for the child maintenance system in Great Britain. It has a primary objective to maximise the number of effective child maintenance arrangements in place and a statutory duty to provide an information and guidance service. Child Maintenance Options was launched in July 2008 to meet this statutory duty.

Around 200 experts work at Child Maintenance Options answering people’s queries on the phone, by e-mail, via the live chat service on their website or providing face-to-face support when needed.

In 2010, Child Maintenance Options ran a national promotional campaign, involving TV, radio, online and print advertising. This generated 66,500 calls to the service showing a growing demand for this type of support.

== Impact of Child Maintenance Options ==
As of September 2010, Child Maintenance Options had handled more than 500,000 successful contacts (defined as a meaningful conversation about child maintenance) and had more than a million hits on its website.

As at March 2011 around 91,000 children were benefiting from a family-based arrangement set up by separated parents after contact with the service.

The success of the Options service was further demonstrated in 2010 by its success in winning the Contact Centre Association Global Service Excellence award for Best Outsourcing Partnership, as well as being shortlisted to the final three for the Best Public Service award at the 2010 Civil Service Awards.
