= Department for Work and Pensions =

UK Government ministerial department

- Yr Adran Gwaith a Phensiynau (Welsh)
- Logo of the Department for Work and Pensions

Department overview
- Formed: 8 June 2001
- Preceding Department: Department of Social Security
- Jurisdiction: Government of the United Kingdom (Great Britain only)
- Headquarters: Caxton House, Tothill Street, London
- Employees: 84,550 as of June 2024
- Annual budget: £176.3 billion (Resource AME); £6.3 billion (Resource DEL); £0.3 billion (Capital DEL); £2.3 billion (Non-Budget Expenditure); Estimated for year ending 31 March 2017
- Secretary of State responsible: Pat McFadden MP, Secretary of State for Work and Pensions
- Department executives: Sarah Healey, Permanent Secretary; Barbara Bennett, Director General, Operations
- Website: gov.uk/dwp

- Applies to: Great Britain
- Relates to: Social security

Other UK counterparts
- Northern Ireland: Department for Communities; Department for the Economy (health and safety only)

The Department for Work and Pensions (DWP) is a ministerial department of the Government of the United Kingdom. It is responsible for welfare, pensions and child maintenance policy in Great Britain. As the UK's biggest public service department it administers the State Pension and a range of working age, disability and ill health benefits to around 20 million claimants and customers. It is the second-largest governmental department in terms of employees, and the largest in terms of expenditure (£297 billion as of September 2025).

The department has two delivery services: Jobcentre Plus administers working age benefits: Universal Credit, Jobseeker's Allowance and Employment and Support Allowance; the Child Maintenance Service provides the statutory child support scheme. DWP also administers State Pension, Pension Credit, disability benefits such as Personal Independence Payment, and support for life events from Maternity Allowance to bereavement benefits.

Non-departmental bodies accountable to DWP include the Health and Safety Executive, The Pensions Regulator and the Money and Pensions Service. Northern Ireland is managed by the Department for Communities.

== History ==
The department was created on 8 June 2001 as a merger of the Department of Social Security, Employment Service and the policy groups of the Department for Education and Employment involved in employment policy and international issues.

The department was initially tasked with creating Jobcentre Plus and the Pensions Service from the Employment Service and the Benefits Agency. The department became responsible for welfare and pension policy. It aims "to help its customers become financially independent and to help reduce child poverty".

In 2012, the department fully subsumed pensions, disability and life events under the DWP name; Jobcentre Plus and Child Maintenance Service remain as distinct identities publicly.

Until 2021, the DWP was still using ICL VME based computer systems originating from its 1988 Pension Service Computer System to support state pension payments. The software was migrated to an in-house VME replacement system, in one of the largest computer replacement projects in Europe.

== Ministers ==
DWP ministers are as follows:

Minister	Portrait	Office	Portfolio
Pat McFadden MP		Secretary of State for Work and Pensions	Overall responsibility for the department; people of working age; employers; pensioners; families and children; disabled people, also in the Cabinet.
Sir Stephen Timms MP		Minister of State for Social Security and Disability	Oversight of Disability Unit, and cross-government disability policy; Health and disability reform; Universal Credit and Legacy Benefits Delivery; Contributory Benefits, Personal Independence Payment (PIP), Disability Living Allowance (DLA), and Employment and Support Allowance (ESA); Carer’s Allowance (CA); Housing; Access to Work; Health Transformation Programme; Health and Safety Executive; Safeguarding (including Serious Case Panel); Serious Case Panel; Uprating and Benefit Cap; Industrial Injuries Disablement Benefit and oversight of the Industrial Injuries Advisory Council
Andrew Western MP		Minister of State for Employment	Labour Market, including employer engagement and the impact of AI; Jobs and Careers Service reform, including digital reform, Jobcentre Plus and post-19 careers; Work and Health: Occupational Health and Statutory Sick Pay; Employment support (incl. Restart, Pathways to Work); Conditionality and Sanctions; In Work Progression; Devolution; Disability Employment
Jacqui Smith, Baroness Smith of Malvern		Minister of State for Skills	Youth Guarantee; apprenticeships, including the Growth and Skills Levy; Skills England; Not in Education, Employment or Training (NEETs), including pre-19 careers' skills related In Work Progression. Jointly with Department for Education.
Maeve Sherlock, Baroness Sherlock		Minister of State for Work and Pensions	Poverty (including Child Poverty Strategy, Crisis and Resilience Fund (CRF)); Child Maintenance Service; Parental Leave and Pay Review; Disadvantaged Groups; Maternity and Bereavement Benefits; Oversight of the Social Security Advisory Committee; Family Policy; Research (including Star Chamber); Oversight of departmental activity including People and Capability, Non-Executive Directors, Ministerial Correspondence and Freedom of Information (FOI) processes; Commercial functions; Legislation coordination, including Statutory Instruments
Torsten Bell MP		Parliamentary Under-Secretary of State for Pensions	Private Pensions; State Pension; Pensioner Benefits; Social Fund; Net Zero; Arm’s Length Bodies (ALBs): Money and Pensions Service (MaPS), National Employment Savings Trust (NEST), The Pensions Ombudsman (TPO), Pensions Protection Fund (PPF), The Pensions Regulator (TPR). Jointly with HM Treasury.
Lilian Greenwood MP		Parliamentary Under-Secretary of State for Innovation, Fraud and Data	Fraud, Error and Debt; Oversight of departmental transformation, including digital, AI and service modernisation; International, including Migrant Access to Benefits; Departmental Transformation (including 2030 Strategy); Parliamentary engagement on Department for Work and Pensions (DWP) policy; Synergy; Customer Experience; Estates; DWP resilience; Shadow DWP Lords in the Commons (including Child poverty, Skills, Youth, Child Maintenance Service (CMS)); Deputy for Ministers of State in Parliament

The permanent secretary is Sir Peter Schofield.

== Pension Service ==
With the creation of the department in June 2001, the Pension Service was created, bringing together many different departments and divisions. The Pension Service is a 'dedicated service for current and future pensioners'.

The Pension Service consists of local Pension Centres and centrally-based centres, many of latter are based at the Tyneview Park complex in Newcastle upon Tyne. The following centres are at Tyneview Park:

- Future Pension Centre (FPC) provides state pension forecasts for people approaching retirement age.
- Newcastle Pension Centre (NPC) originally dealt with the London area, the Home Counties, and part of West Midlands. Now the service is virtual so all pension centres deal with all areas of the country.
- Pension Tracing Service (PTS) helps track old pensions and pension schemes.
- International Pension Centre (IPC) deals with all enquiries regarding the payment of state pension, bereavement benefits, incapacity benefits and other such benefits for those living abroad.

Local Pension Centres deal with localised claims for state pension and retirement related benefits. Pension Centres are found all over the country. Benefits dealt with at local Pension Centres include:

- Pension Credit (replaced a former scheme known as 'Minimum Income Guarantee' in October 2003)
- Winter Fuel Payments
- Cold Weather Payments

== Disability and Carers Service ==
The Disability and Carers Service offers financial support for those who are disabled and their carers, whether in or out of employment. The DCS have offices throughout the country and deal with the following benefits:

- Disability Living Allowance
- Attendance Allowance
- Carer's Allowance
- Vaccine Damage Payment
- Personal Independence Payment

The department has been found to frequently invite disabled people to interviews in buildings which are themselves not accessible to people with disabilities. When the person does not attend the interview they deny the person disability benefits, causing malnutrition and destitution. The DWP systematically underpaid disabled claimants who were transferred from Incapacity Benefit to Employment and Support allowance, risking hardship for claimants. A cross party committee of MPs, the Public Accounts Committee accused the DWP of a culture of indifference to claimants.

Since at least 2020 DWP has had a policy of cold-calling vulnerable and disabled people to attempt to pressure them into accepting lower benefit claims than they were legally entitled. In July 2021 the DWP agreed to stop after it was threatened with legal action.

=== Disability Confident scheme ===
DWP administers the Disability Confident scheme, which supports employers to employ people with disabilities and to maintain the employment of staff who become disabled. The scheme operates as three levels:

- Level 1: Disability Confident Committed
- Level 2: Disability Confident Employer
- Level 3: Disability Confident Leader

The scheme is intended to encourage employers to "think differently about disability and take action to improve how they recruit, retain and develop disabled people", but the DWP lost more disability discrimination cases at employment tribunal than any other employer in Britain between 2016 and 2019.

== Tell Us Once ==
The DWP introduced the "Tell Us Once" system in 2011 to enable people to use a single interface to inform the government about a change in their personal circumstances. Using 'Tell Us Once', departments and agencies like the pensions service, HM Revenue & Customs, the Passport Office and local authorities are informed about a person's change in circumstances in parallel, removing the need for "repeated, unnecessary form-filling". Local authority departments making use of the service include libraries, housing departments, "Blue Badge" services and adult social care.

In most cases, a Registrar of Births, Marriages and Deaths will notify a person who registers a death about using the service.

DWP transferred to a cloud-based service in 2016 using the government's G-Cloud purchasing process for IT services. The Crown Commercial Service states that "cutting administration costs and reducing the overpayments of benefits—usually because of out-of-date records of people's personal circumstances—protected the cross-government savings generated by Tell Us Once, estimated at more than £20 million per year. By switching from a physical infrastructure to a cloud solution, DWP has also benefited from cost savings of around 50% on the IT running costs of Tell Us Once".

== Former structure ==
Before 2008, The Pension Service and the Disability and Carers Service were two separate executive agencies; however, it was decided in April 2008 to merge them into one entity named The Pension, Disability and Carers Service.

Both former agencies kept their corporate branding and provided services under their separate identities. The decision was made due to the two agencies sharing about half of the same customers; as a single agency, the rationalisation of services would provide a better service for customers.

The status of PDCS as an executive agency (and its existence as a merged entity) was removed on 1 October 2011 with the functions being brought back inside the department; and both The Pension Service and the Disability and Carers Service becoming distinct entities once again. Prior to July 2012 the Child Support Agency was the operating arm of the Child Maintenance and Enforcement Commission (CMEC).

All are now operated wholly from within the department, with the brand names shut down in 2012.

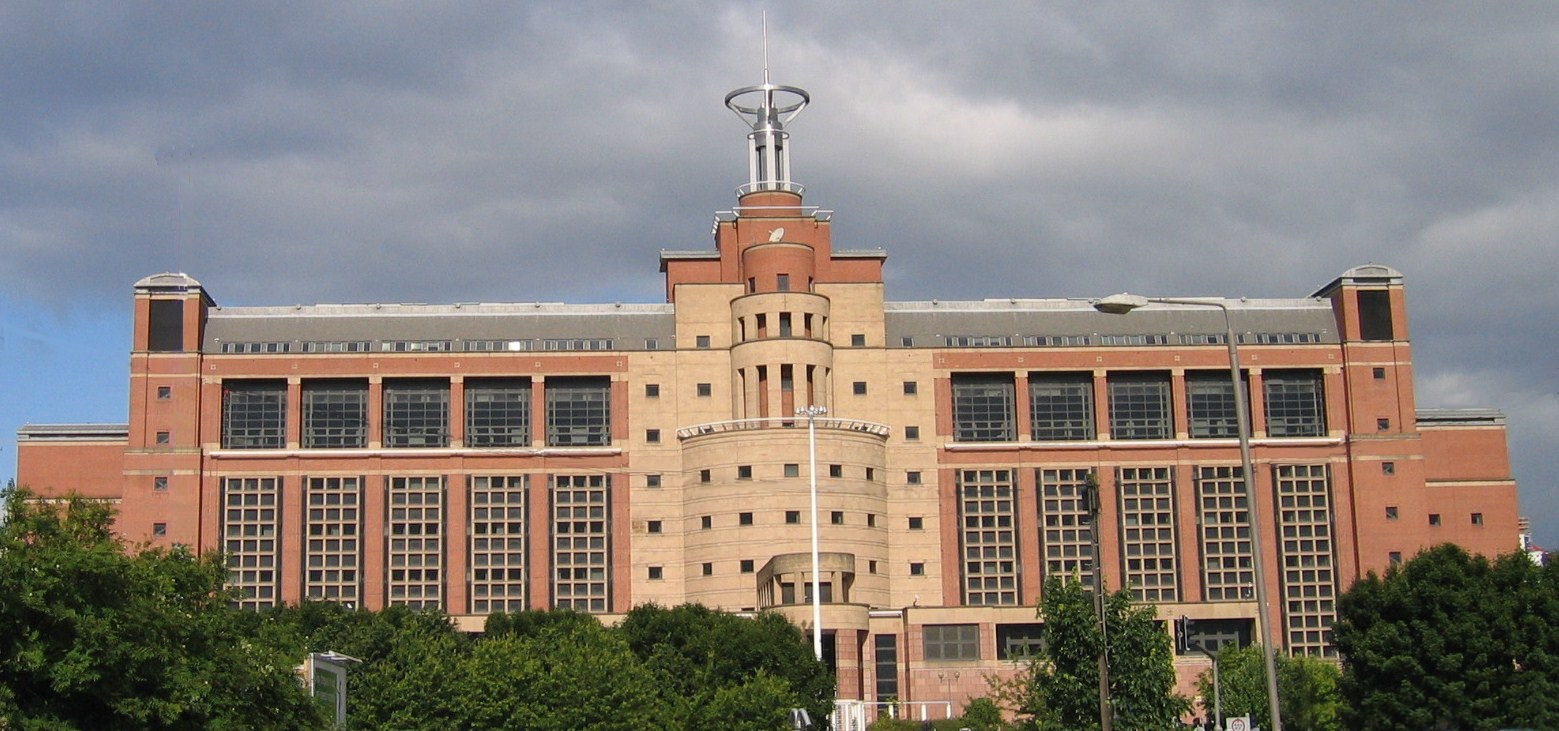
DWP buildings at Quarry Hill, Leeds

== Public bodies ==
The department's public bodies include:

=== Executive agencies ===
- Skills England

=== Executive non-departmental public bodies ===
- Construction Industry Training Board
- Engineering Construction Industry Training Board
- Health and Safety Executive
- Money and Pensions Service
- The Pensions Regulator

=== Advisory non-departmental public bodies ===
- Social Security Advisory Committee

=== Tribunals ===
- Pensions Ombudsman

=== Public corporations ===
- National Employment Savings Trust
- Pension Protection Fund

== Estate ==
The department has corporate buildings in London, Leeds, Blackpool, Glasgow, Aberdeen, Newcastle upon Tyne, Warrington, Manchester and Sheffield. Jobcentre Plus, Child Maintenance Service and other departmental services operate through a network of around 650 Jobcentres and service centres across the UK.

In August 2025, union officials revealed that they believed a DWP building in Treforest was unsafe after reports that three window panes had cracked or fallen out of the building. 1,600 members of staff work at the hub, which was opened in 2020. The PCS demanded a full audit of the building, while a DWP spokesperson claimed that the building had been reopened after being declared safe.

== Budget ==
The total annual budget of the department in 2011–12 was £151.6 billion, representing approximately 28% of total UK Government spending. The department spends a far greater share of national wealth than any other department in Britain, by a wide margin. The department spends an average of £348.9 million with suppliers per month. The government noted in 2013 that DWP's third-party expenditure was characterised by a number of "complex, high-value contracts".

A report of February 2012 found that billions of pounds payable had not been claimed. In 2009–2010 the DWP stated £1.95 billion job-seekers allowance, £2 billion income support and employment and support allowance, £2.4 billion in council tax, £2.8 billion in pension credit and £3.1 billion for housing benefit; in total £12.25 billion had not been claimed.

== Research ==
The department is a major commissioner of external social science research, with the objective of providing the evidence base needed to inform departmental strategy, policy-making and delivery. The department has developed and uses various microsimulation and other models, including the Policy Simulation Model (for appraisal of policy options), Pensim2 (to create projections of pension entitlements up to 2100) and Inform (to produce the department's benefit caseload forecasts). Datasets held include the LLMDB and the Family Resources Survey.

During 2012 the department announced records of the number of people born outside of the United Kingdom ("non-UK nationals") claiming work-related benefits from 2011, using data already collated within the department together with those of HM Revenue and Customs and the UK Border Agency (whose duties are now fulfilled by UK Visas and Immigration).

== Devolution ==
=== Scotland ===
Employment, health and safety, and social security policy are reserved matters of the United Kingdom government. The Scotland Act 2016 devolved specific areas of social security to the Scottish Government to administer and reform. The Scottish Parliament passed the Social Security (Scotland) Act 2018 to establish a statutory basis of Social Security in Scotland. This created a principled based legislative agenda for Social Security providing for social security to be a human right in Scotland. Most aspects of social security in Scotland remain reserved to the United Kingdom and those will remain administered by the DWP.

The Act established Social Security Scotland, an executive agency of the Scottish Government.

=== Northern Ireland ===
The Department for Work and Pensions does not cover Northern Ireland.

Northern Ireland has parity with Great Britain in three areas:

- social security
- child support
- pensions

Policy in these areas are devolved to the Northern Ireland Assembly, although it is legislated that the two authorities should seek parity with each other to ensure there is a single system of payments across the United Kingdom. The Vaccine Damage Payments Scheme was not administered locally in Northern Ireland and was managed by DWP. Other payments managed by HM Revenue and Customs are UK-wide. Employment and health and safety policy are fully devolved.

The department's main counterparts in Northern Ireland are:

- the Department for Communities (administers welfare policy)
- the Department for the Economy (oversees the Health and Safety Executive for Northern Ireland)

== Supply chain and procurement ==
Partners, providers and sub-contractors are used extensively by DWP, for supply of goods and services in general but especially in employment related services. A Code of Conduct aiming to "to ensure excellent sub contractual relationships between the top-tier and high performing third sector and other organisations" working for these schemes was established in the department's 2008 Commissioning Strategy. This code was subsequently developed into the "Merlin Standard", "a standard of behaviour which DWP prime providers are expected to adhere to in their relationship with their subcontractors ... [and which] is designed to encourage excellence in supply chain management by prime providers". A "Merlin Standard Advisory Board" was established in July 2011. The Merlin Standard was replaced with new Provider Guidance in 2013.

DWP contributes to government ambitions to make supply chains more accessible to small and medium-sized enterprises, but the government commented in 2013 that it had yet to secure good insight into the supply chain role of SMEs.

== Controversies ==
In August 2015, the department admitted using fictional stories from made-up claimants on leaflets advertising the positive impact of benefit sanctions, following a Freedom of Information request from Welfare Weekly, claiming that they were for "illustrative purposes only" and that it was "quite wrong" to pass these off as genuine quotes.

Later that month figures were released which showed that between December 2011 and February 2014, 2,650 people died shortly after their Work Capability Assessment told them that they should be finding work. The DWP had fought hard for the figures not to be released, with chief minister Iain Duncan Smith at one point telling Parliament that they did not exist.

In 2019, a computer system was introduced but the DWP refused to reveal details. Claimants and their supporters feared it would add to poverty and hardship. Frank Field MP stated in early 2020 that claimants, "will be left at the mercy of online systems that, even now, leave all too many people teetering on the brink of destitution. We've already seen, in the gig economy, how workers are managed and sacked, not by people, but by algorithms. Now the welfare state looks set to follow suit, with the 'social' human element being stripped away from 'social security'."

In 2019, the department was found by an independent inquiry to have broken its own rules, in a case where a disabled woman killed herself in 2017 after her benefits were stopped when she missed a Work Capability Assessment because she had pneumonia. Previous research published in the Journal of Epidemiology and Community Health by Oxford University and Liverpool University had found that there were an additional 590 suicides between 2010 and 2013 in areas where such assessments were carried out. The researchers said that the DWP had introduced the policy of moving people off benefits without understanding the consequences. In 2022 the department refused to release data to researchers at Glasgow University who were investigating if benefit sanctions were linked to suicides. This was despite earlier promises by ministers that they were supporting the researchers.

The department came under further scrutiny in 2020, following reporting from Disability News Service into the death of Errol Graham. Graham was a 57 year old disabled man who starved to death in 2018, months after the DWP stopped his Employment and Support Allowance. His body was found after bailiffs broke down his door to evict him. His body weighed just over 4 stone and the only food in his flat were a two out of date cans of fish. The coroner in Graham's case considered the loss of his income as a contributing factor to his death. In 2023, Nottingham City safeguarding adults board published an independent review into Graham's death, where they criticised the DWP for failing to share the severity of Graham’s disabilities with his landlord, or GP. It was later reported that the DWP spent over £50,000 attempting to prevent information about Graham’s case from being released through the Freedom of Information Act.

== See also ==
- Benefit fraud in the United Kingdom
- Pensions Commission
- Review Body
- Pension, Disability and Carers Service
- Budget of the United Kingdom
- Welfare rights
