= Houldsworth v Bridge Trustees Ltd =

- Court: Supreme Court
- Citation: [2011] UKSC 42, [2011] 1 WLR 1912

Keywords
- Final salary pension, defined contribution

Houldsworth v Bridge Trustees Ltd [2011] UKSC 42 is a UK pensions and UK labour law case concerning the difference between a final salary and a money purchase pension scheme. It matters because final salary schemes fall under the minimum funding requirements, whereas money purchase schemes do not.

== Facts ==
Bridge Trustees operated a final salary occupational pension since 1971. In 1983, the final salary benefits were reduced, as were contributions, but members could make further contributions and receive more under a "voluntary investment planning" scheme. In 1992, a new "MoneyMatch" plan allowed members to convert their final salary benefits and their contributions would be matched by the employer. Before 6 April 1997, the scheme was contracted out of the state earnings related pension scheme, as there was a guaranteed minimum pension paid out of the MoneyMatch plan. In 2003, the employer went insolvent, the scheme would up and there were pension deficits. The trustee asked the court whether the scheme was "money purchase" under the Pensions Act 1995 section 73. This counts the outstanding money as a debt due from the employer, unless it is a money purchase scheme.

The judge held that the scheme was money purchase, despite the MoneyMatch contributions, the employers matching credits being put into the guaranteed interest fund, and the capital value of a member's interest being internally converted to an annuity. The Court of Appeal upheld the judge's conclusions.

== Judgment ==
Lord Walker held that the Pension Schemes Act 1993 section 181 did not define money purchase benefits as ones calculated only by reference to payments made by the member. Assets and liabilities did not need to be in equilibrium as a part of the money purchase scheme definition. But in all insured schemes and self-administered schemes, the assumption was usually justified. It followed that the guaranteed interest fund did not disconnect a member's eventual benefits from contributions, and take it out of the definition under section 181. Providing internal annuities, as opposed to buying them from a life office was compatible with the meaning of a money purchase scheme. So, the VIP and MoneyMatch plans were money purchase benefits. The reference in regulation 13(1)(ii) of the Occupational Pension Schemes (Winding Up) Regulations 1996 to “the assets by reference to which the rate or amount of those benefits is calculated” showed Parliament contemplated that money purchase benefits would normally be adequately funded but not over-funded, and money or assets to be withdrawn from the unappropriated fund for the purposes of section 73 of the 1995 Act should be of an amount or value equal to the money purchase benefits calculated by the guaranteed interest fund mechanism, less appropriate deductions for elements which under regulation 13(2)(a) are not “relevant money purchase benefits”, but take first priority under section 73 of the 1995 Act.

Baroness Hale, Lord Clarke and Lord Collins concurred. Lord Mance dissented.

== See also ==
- UK labour law
