= SERPS =

SERPS may refer to:

- State Earnings-Related Pension Scheme, a former British UK Government pension arrangement
- Search engine results pages
