= Contracting out =

Contracting out may refer to:

- Outsourcing, or contracting out business functions
- Contracting out of the State Second Pension in the UK
- Exclusion clause, or contracting out of certain rights
