= Barber v Guardian Royal Exchange Assurance Group =

- Court: European Court of Justice
- Decided: 17 May 1990
- Citations: (1990) C-262/88, [1990] IRLR 240

Keywords
- Pensions, sex discrimination

Barber v Guardian Royal Exchange Assurance Group (1990) C-262/88 is an EU labour law and UK labour law case concerning sex discrimination in pensions.

== Facts ==
UK law allowed employers to set different occupational pension entitlement ages. Barber claimed against his employer, Guardian Royal Exchange Assurance, that he should be able to get an occupational pension at the same time as his woman co-workers. The Court of Appeal made a reference to the European Court of Justice whether this violated community law on equal treatment of the sexes.

== Judgment ==
The European Court of Justice held that TFEU article 157 (now TEC article 119) precluded men and women having different age conditions for pension entitlements. Occupational pension schemes are included as pay, even though the scheme operated by a trust technically independent of the employers. It operated in partial substitution for benefits under the state social security system, even if it is with reference to a national scheme.

The first question

10 In its first question the Court of Appeal seeks to ascertain, in substance, whether the benefits paid by an employer to a worker in connection with the latter' s compulsory redundancy fall within the scope of Article 119 of the Treaty and the directive on equal pay or within the scope of the directive on equal treatment.

[...]

12 As the Court has held, the concept of pay, within the meaning of the second paragraph of Article 119, comprises any other consideration, whether in cash or in kind, whether immediate or future, provided that the worker receives it, albeit indirectly, in respect of his employment from his employer (see, in particular, the judgment of 9 February 1982 in Case 12/81 Garland v British Rail Engineering (1982) ECR 359, paragraph 5). Accordingly, the fact that certain benefits are paid after the termination of the employment relationship does not prevent them from being in the nature of pay, within the meaning of Article 119 of the Treaty.

13 As regards, in particular, the compensation granted to a worker in connection with his redundancy, it must be stated that such compensation constitutes a form of pay to which the worker is entitled in respect of his employment, which is paid to him upon termination of the employment relationship, which makes it possible to facilitate his adjustment to the new circumstances resulting from the loss of his employment and which provides him with a source of income during the period in which he is seeking new employment.

14 It follows that compensation granted to a worker in connection with his redundancy falls in principle within the concept of pay for the purposes of Article 119 of the Treaty.

15 At the hearing, the United Kingdom argued that the statutory redundancy payment fell outside the scope of Article 119 of the Treaty because it constituted a social security benefit and not a form of pay.

16 In that regard it must be pointed out that a redundancy payment made by the employer, such as that which is at issue, cannot cease to constitute a form of pay on the sole ground that, rather than deriving from the contract of employment, it is a statutory or ex gratia payment.

17 In the case of statutory redundancy payments it must be borne in mind that, as the Court held in its judgment of 8 April 1976 in Case 43/75 Defrenne v Sabena (1976) ECR 455, paragraph 40, Article 119 of the Treaty also applies to discrimination arising directly from legislative provisions. This means that benefits provided for by law may come within the concept of pay for the purposes of that provision.

18 Although it is true that many advantages granted by an employer also reflect considerations of social policy, the fact that a benefit is in the nature of pay cannot be called in question where the worker is entitled to receive the benefit in question from his employer by reason of the existence of the employment relationship .

19 In the case of ex gratia payments by the employer, it is clear from the judgment of 9 February 1982 in Case 12/81 Garland, cited above, paragraph 10, that Article 119 also applies to advantages which an employer grants to workers although he is not required to do so by contract.

20 Accordingly, without there being any need to discuss whether or not the directive on equal treatment is applicable, the answer to the first question must be that the benefits paid by an employer to a worker in connection with the latter' s compulsory redundancy fall within the scope of the second paragraph of Article 119, whether they are paid under a contract of employment, by virtue of legislative provisions or on a voluntary basis.

The second question

21 In view of the answer given to the first question, the second question must be understood as seeking in substance to ascertain whether a retirement pension paid under a contracted-out private occupational scheme falls within the scope of Article 119 of the Treaty, in particular where that pension is awarded in connection with compulsory redundancy.

22 It must be pointed out in that regard that, in its judgment of 25 May 1971 in Case 80/70 Defrenne v Belgium (1971) ECR 445, paragraphs 7 and 8, the Court stated that consideration in the nature of social security benefits is not in principle alien to the concept of pay. However, the Court pointed out that this concept, as defined in Article 119, cannot encompass social security schemes or benefits, in particular retirement pensions, directly governed by legislation without any element of agreement within the undertaking or the occupational branch concerned, which are compulsorily applicable to general categories of workers.

23 The Court noted that those schemes afford the workers the benefit of a statutory scheme, to the financing of which workers, employers and possibly the public authorities contribute in a measure determined less by the employment relationship than by considerations of social policy.

24 In order to answer the second question, therefore, it is necessary to ascertain whether those considerations also apply to contracted-out private occupational schemes such as that referred to in this case.

25 In that regard it must be pointed out first of all that the schemes in question are the result either of an agreement between workers and employers or of a unilateral decision taken by the employer. They are wholly financed by the employer or by both the employer and the workers without any contribution being made by the public authorities in any circumstances. Accordingly, such schemes form part of the consideration offered to workers by the employer.

26 Secondly, such schemes are not compulsorily applicable to general categories of workers. On the contrary, they apply only to workers employed by certain undertakings, with the result that affiliation to those schemes derives of necessity from the employment relationship with a given employer. Furthermore, even if the schemes in question are established in conformity with national legislation and consequently satisfy the conditions laid down by it for recognition as contracted-out schemes, they are governed by their own rules.

27 Thirdly, it must be pointed out that, even if the contributions paid to those schemes and the benefits which they provide are in part a substitute for those of the general statutory scheme, that fact cannot preclude the application of Article 119. It is apparent from the documents before the Court that occupational schemes such as that referred to in this case may grant to their members benefits greater than those which would be paid by the statutory scheme, with the result that their economic function is similar to that of the supplementary schemes which exist in certain Member States, where affiliation and contribution to the statutory scheme is compulsory and no derogation is allowed. In its judgment of 13 May 1986 in Case 170/84 Bilka-Kaufhaus v Weber von Hartz (1986) ECR 1607, the Court held that the benefits awarded under a supplementary pension scheme fell within the concept of pay, within the meaning of Article 119.

28 It must therefore be concluded that, unlike the benefits awarded by national statutory social security schemes, a pension paid under a contracted-out scheme constitutes consideration paid by the employer to the worker in respect of his employment and consequently falls within the scope of Article 119 of the Treaty .

29 That interpretation of Article 119 is not affected by the fact that the private occupational scheme in question has been set up in the form of a trust and is administered by trustees who are technically independent of the employer, since Article 119 also applies to consideration received indirectly from the employer.

30 The answer to the second question submitted by the Court of Appeal must therefore be that a pension paid under a contracted-out private occupational scheme falls within the scope of Article 119 of the Treaty.

The third and fifth questions

31 In these questions the Court of Appeal seeks in substance to ascertain, in the first place, whether it is contrary to Article 119 of the Treaty for a man made compulsorily redundant to be entitled only to a deferred pension payable at the normal pensionable age when a woman in the same position receives an immediate retirement pension as a result of the application of an age condition that varies according to sex in the same way as is provided for by the national statutory pension scheme. Secondly, the Court of Appeal wishes to ascertain, in substance, whether equal pay must be ensured at the level of each element of remuneration or only on the basis of a comprehensive assessment of the consideration paid to workers.

32 In the case of the first of those two questions thus formulated, it is sufficient to point out that Article 119 prohibits any discrimination with regard to pay as between men and women, whatever the system which gives rise to such inequality. Accordingly, it is contrary to Article 119 to impose an age condition which differs according to sex in respect of pensions paid under a contracted-out scheme, even if the difference between the pensionable age for men and that for women is based on the one provided for by the national statutory scheme.

33 As regards the second of those questions, it is appropriate to refer to the judgments of 30 June 1988 in Case 318/86 Commission v France (1988) ECR 3559, paragraph 27 and of 17 October 1989 in Case 109/88 Handels-og Kontorfunktionaerernes Forbund i Danmark v Dansk Arbejdsgiverforening, acting on behalf of Danfoss (1989) ECR 3199, paragraph 12, in which the Court emphasized the fundamental importance of transparency and, in particular, of the possibility of a review by the national courts, in order to prevent and, if necessary, eliminate any discrimination based on sex.

34 With regard to the means of verifying compliance with the principle of equal pay, it must be stated that if the national courts were under an obligation to make an assessment and a comparison of all the various types of consideration granted, according to the circumstances, to men and women, judicial review would be difficult and the effectiveness of Article 119 would be diminished as a result . It follows that genuine transparency, permitting an effective review, is assured only if the principle of equal pay applies to each of the elements of remuneration granted to men or women.

35 The answer to the third and fifth questions submitted by the Court of Appeal must therefore be that it is contrary to Article 119 of the Treaty for a man made compulsorily redundant to be entitled to claim only a deferred pension payable at the normal pensionable age when a woman in the same position is entitled to an immediate retirement pension as a result of the application of an age condition that varies according to sex in the same way as is provided for by the national statutory pension scheme . The application of the principle of equal pay must be ensured in respect of each element of remuneration and not only on the basis of a comprehensive assessment of the consideration paid to workers.

== See also ==
- UK labour law
- EU law
- European labour law
- Unfair dismissal
