= LLMDB =

The Lifelong Labour Market Database (LLMDB2) is a panel data set, owned by the Department for Work and Pensions in Britain. LLMDB2 holds a 1% sample from the new National Insurance Recording System (NIRS2) and is a fully representative sample of around 600000 people. LLMDB2 started to record the income and other characteristics of its individuals in 1978. It is especially useful for the analysis of private pension contributions. It is used for the Pensim2 microsimulation model.
