= Child Maintenance Group =

Arm of the Department for Work and Pensions

- CMG is responsible for the delivery of the Child Maintenance Service

Executive Agency overview
- Formed: 2012
- Preceding Executive Agency: Child Maintenance and Enforcement Commission
- Superseding Executive Agency: Department for Work and Pensions
- Jurisdiction: United Kingdom
- Headquarters: Leeds, United Kingdom
- Minister responsible: Various incumbents, Secretary of State for Work and Pensions
- Parent department: Department for Work and Pensions
- Website: https://www.gov.uk/child-maintenance/overview

The Child Maintenance Group (CMG) is a department and function of the Department for Work and Pensions in Great Britain and the Department for Communities in Northern Ireland. Launched in 2012 to replace its predecessor, the Child Maintenance and Enforcement Commission, the CMG is responsible for implementing the Child Support Act 1991 and subsequent legislation in the form of its two services, the Child Support Agency and from 2012 its long-term successor, the Child Maintenance Service.

== Ministerial responsibility ==
The current minister in charge of the Child Maintenance Service is Baroness Maeve Sherlock

== Basis for calculation ==
Child maintenance is assessed on a number of factors.

- a non-resident parent's annual gross income.
- the number of children that live with the non resident parent.
- the number of children in a family-based arrangement.
- the number of qualifying children on the child maintenance case.
- shared care: the existing number of overnight stays are banded. For example, between 52 and 103 overnight stays a year will entitle the resident parents to a 1/7 reduction.
- special expenses, such as contact costs.

Once this is factored in, payments are calculated based upon a percentage of the non-resident parent's income.

== Methods of payment ==
"The CMS includes two service types; ‘Direct Pay’ where payments are arranged and agreed between parents, and ‘Collect & Pay’ where payments are collected and paid to the receiving parent.

Collect & Pay can be requested by either parent but can only be applied with the agreement of both parents, or if the Secretary of State has deemed the paying parent unlikely to pay. The unlikely to pay check is a decision made by a Caseworker for each individual case using their judgement based on their merits."

== Collection fees ==
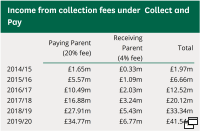

Child maintenance fees are typically based on various factors, including the income of the parents, number of children, and specific guidelines or laws in your jurisdiction. You have to pay a fee each time you make or receive a regular child maintenance payment under the "Collect & Pay" Service. The fee is:

20% (which is added to the payment) for paying parents

4% (which is taken off the payment) for receiving parents

The compound revenue the CMS generates is therefore 24.8% of the original maintenance amount.

In 2019/20, the CMS generated £41.54 million in revenue from fees from Paying Parents and Receiving Parents on the Collect and Pay Scheme.

== Statistics ==
Experimental statistics exist in the public domain on the child maintenance arrangements administered by the Child Maintenance Service.

== Criticism ==
In November 2020 information came to light from Freedom of Information Act requests, which led to allegations that as many as 1,000 statistically excess deaths, believed to be suicide, are linked to the actions of the Child Maintenance Service each year. The excess deaths are almost exclusively limited to paying parents in arrears to the CMS at the time of death.

In June 2020 a group of 4 receiving parents (4 single mothers), initiated a legal action against the CMS to ""challenge the persistent failure" of the Child Maintenance Service." to collect money from paying parents on their behalf.

== Press releases and news ==
- Official GOV.UK Website; Child Maintenance Reform

== See also ==
- Child Support Agency
- Shared care
