= Child Support Agency =

Former government agency in the UK

- Child Support Agency logo

Agency overview
- Formed: 5 April 1992
- Dissolved: 31 October 2012
- Superseding agency: Child Maintenance and Enforcement Commission
- Jurisdiction: Great Britain
- Status: Abolished
- Minister responsible: Secretary of State for Work and Pensions
- Parent department: Department for Work and Pensions

The Child Support Agency (CSA) was a delivery arm of the Department for Work and Pensions (Child Maintenance Group) in Great Britain and the former Department for Social Development in Northern Ireland. Launched on 5 April 1993, the CSA was to implement the Child Support Act 1991 and arrange payments for parents living with their children. The CSA was abolished and replaced in 2008 by its successor, the Child Maintenance and Enforcement Commission (CMEC), which in turn was replaced by the Child Maintenance Service (CMS) in 2012.

== Functions and involvement ==
The CSA's function was twofold, encompassing calculation of how much child maintenance is due (based on current legislation and rules) and collection, enforcement and transferral of the payment from the non-resident parent to the person with care.

For the CSA to generate a mediation of payment case, their services had to be requested by one of the parents; or to generate a recovery case, the parent with care (PWC) had to be in receipt of Income Support, Jobseeker's Allowance, Sickness Benefit, or another such benefit. Legislation also allowed children in Scotland to initiate a case against one or both non-resident parents (NPCs).

The CSA could not get involved, even upon request, in the following circumstances (except in cases where the parent with care claims Income Support or Jobseeker's Allowance):

- if the non-resident parent lives abroad;
- if a written agreement, made prior to 5 April 1993, is in place;
- if a court order regarding maintenance was made before 3 March 2003.

== Calculation and systems ==
A new method of child maintenance calculation came into effect on 3 March 2003. The previous method used a "complex formula of up to 108 pieces of information", by first calculating the total child maintenance required based on the children's ages, then calculating the non-resident parents income after various allowances were subtracted, and finally working out what portion of the calculated maintenance was to be paid by the non-resident parent, based on their income.

Under the new method the formula for child maintenance was simplified, with a fixed percentage basic rate being calculated using the NRPs net income (of £200 to £2,000 per week), and deductions of 15% for one child, 20% for two, and 25% for three or more. Where maintenance is calculated using the basic rate, the amount of maintenance is also reduced if the non-resident parent has children in their current family. Where this is relevant, the CSA would not take into account: 15% of their net weekly income if there is one child living with them, 20% if they are two children living with them, and 25% for three or more.

== Criticism ==
The Independent Case Examiner (ICE) was set up in 1997 as an independent body to deal with complaints about the CSA. Three recurring themes are mentioned in multiple previous annual reports, namely delay (51% of complaints in 2004-2005), error (24% of complaints in 2004-2005) and no action taken (14% of complaints in 2004-2005). According to Department for Work and Pensions statistics, the average length of time for a case to be cleared under the new scheme increased from an average of 18 days in March 2003 to 287 in December 2005.

Updated statistics published in the Child Maintenance and Enforcement Commission Annual Report and Accounts 2010/11 showed that, whilst payments were being made in 65% of CSA cases for the year April 2006 – March 2007, this had increased to 78% by March 2011.

Assessments based on the same financial criteria can give different results, depending on which rules the case is judged under. Non-resident parents who would pay less under the new rules could not get reassessed, except in special circumstances. While the CSA planned to move everyone to the same system in due course, in the interim different people with identical situations would pay different amounts, based solely on when the case was first assessed. One father, whose monthly payments would have dropped from £250 to £150 under the new rules, decided to take the CSA to the European Court of Human Rights, claiming that this discrepancy amounted to discrimination under article 14 of the convention. However, official statistics showed that the average weekly liability was slightly more under the new scheme. For the years 2006—2007, the average new scheme liability was constantly £23 per week, whereas the old scheme varied from £22 to £23.

In November 2004, the head of the CSA resigned amid widespread criticism of the CSA systems. Sir Archy Kirkwood, chairman of Work and Pensions Committee, described the situation as "a systemic, chronic failure of management right across the totality of the agency." In November 2005, Prime Minister Tony Blair, admitted that the CSA is "not properly suited" to its job, amid reports that for every £1.85 that gets through to children, the CSA spend £1 on administration.

Even prior to its opening, the CSA was subject to criticism, with MP David Tredinnick describing the CSA as a "sequel to 1984" due to concerns about "CSA Snooping". In February 2006, Secretary of State for Work and Pensions John Hutton asked Sir David Henshaw to redesign the child support system with three key areas of focus; how best to ensure parents take financial responsibility for their children when they are apart, the best arrangements for delivering this outcome cost effectively and the options for moving to new structures and policies, recognising the need to protect the level of service offered to the current 1.5 million parents with care.

On 24 July 2006, the Secretary of State for Work and Pensions, John Hutton MP, announced that the CSA was not working and as a result would be axed and replaced by a "smaller, more focused" body.

In March 2008 a website, CSAhell.com, allowed people to publicly post their stories and receive feedback. The website was quoted in the national press on CSA-related stories. Since its creation, the website has published almost 2,500 stories and complaints about the CSA, and has itself been criticised by the Public and Commercial Services Union.

== Outstanding debt ==
CSA arrears accumulated since 1993 totals just under £3.8bn. This total remained largely unchanged between 2008 and 2011.

== Replacement ==
In December 2006, the Department for Work and Pensions published its Child Support white paper outlining its plans for the future of Child Support.

On 1 November 2008, the Child Maintenance and Enforcement Commission took management responsibility for the CSA.

In October 2011, the Department for Work and Pensions launched a public consultation on plans to abolish CMEC and transfer its functions back to the Department. This was approved after consultation and agreement by both Houses of Parliament. Responsibility for staff and functions passed from CMEC back to the Department for Work and Pensions on 30 July 2012, becoming the 'Child Maintenance Group'.

From 10 December 2012, a new system of child maintenance began operation, initially for specific applicants. It is known as the 'Child Maintenance Service', and operates within the legislation provided under the Welfare Reform Act 2012. Existing cases continue under previous legislation at present.

From 25 November 2013, all new applications for child maintenance must be made through the 'Child Maintenance Service' using the new statutory '2012 Scheme' and associated legislation. No new applications are accepted by the Child Support Agency, and existing cases are being closed on a planned progression basis, which is intended to finish by 2017/18.

== See also ==
- Family dispute resolution
- Shared care
