= Policy Simulation Model =

The Policy Simulation Model (PSM) is a static microsimulation model which encapsulates the tax and benefits system, and population, of Great Britain. It is based on survey data from the Family Resources Survey (FRS) which is uprated to simulate the current year, together with several years into the future through a process of static uprating. The uprating process covers a complex range of processes, ranging from simple numerical uprating of financial values, to modelling the draw-down of old benefits through to the implications of the rising state pension age.

The model is built using SAS and is owned by the GB Department for Work and Pensions (DWP). It produces outputs including the financial (and work-incentive) impacts on a representative sample of the GB population from hypothetical policy changes to the tax and benefits system. It is managed by a central team of analysts who both develop the model and provide year-round customer service to analytical users of the model spread across the DWP corporate centre. It is used for poverty and scenario analysis associated with the development of new policies, including Universal Credit.

== See also ==
- Pensim2, another model with the same ownership
- TaxBen, the IFS equivalent model
- IGOTM, the HMT equivalent model
