= Child Maintenance and Enforcement Commission =

UK non-departmental public body

Non-departmental public body overview
- Formed: 2008
- Dissolved: 30 July 2012
- Superseding Non-departmental public body: Child Maintenance Group within Department for Work and Pensions
- Jurisdiction: United Kingdom

The Child Maintenance and Enforcement Commission was a non-departmental public body established to take responsibility for the child maintenance system in Great Britain.

The Commission’s primary objective was to maximise the number of effective child maintenance arrangements (private or statutory) in place for children who live apart from their parents. Under the 2010 UK quango reforms, the Child Maintenance and Enforcement Commission became the Child Maintenance Group external organisation working for the Department for Work and Pensions, who now have responsibility for its functions.

== Functions ==
The Commission had three publicly stated functions:

- to promote the financial responsibility that parents have for their children;
- to provide information and support on the different maintenance options (Child Maintenance Options);
- to provide an efficient statutory child maintenance service with effective enforcement (Child Support Agency).

== History ==
During 2008, the Commission began to offer information and support on the different child maintenance options available to parents. The Commission also provided an efficient statutory child maintenance service with improved assessment, collection and enforcement processes. The new enforcement powers were introduced from 2009/10. These changes aimed to ensure parents take responsibility for providing financial support for their children where they have access to them, or indeed do not.

The Commission was abolished on 30 July 2012, but despite its functions being subsumed back into the Department for Work and Pensions, the 'Child Maintenance Group' continues to operate using the client-facing brand name of the Child Support Agency for those using the 1993 and 2003 statutory schemes.

The new '2012 Scheme' is branded as the Child Maintenance Service and began limited intake of new cases on 10 December 2012.
