= Family Resources Survey =

The Family Resources Survey (FRS) is one of the United Kingdom's largest household surveys. It collects information on the incomes and characteristics of private households in the United Kingdom.

It is published, controlled and funded by Department for Work and Pensions (DWP). Fieldwork is carried out by the Office for National Statistics (ONS) with the National Centre for Social Research (NatCen), and Northern Ireland Statistics and Research Agency (NISRA) on an annual basis.

The FRS is the basis of the main UK poverty and child poverty measures; its data underpins the low income and material deprivation statistics, which are reported in the Households Below Average Income (HBAI) publication.

== History ==
Before 1992, DWP had to rely on other government surveys, for example the Family Expenditure Survey (succeeded by the Living Cost and Food Survey) and the General Household Survey. However their sample sizes proved insufficient for the needs of DWP. The FRS was therefore launched in 1992 to supply DWP with the information it required for policy analysis. It has been conducted annually since then.

Beginning with a sample size of about 26,000 households, the number was reduced in 1997 to 24,000 households. After Northern Ireland was included in the sample, and also a 100% boost was introduced for Scotland, the sample size rose to 29,000 households in 2002 across the UK. In the 2020 to 2021 survey year, the introduction of Government restrictions led to a compulsory halt to face-to-face interviewing. As a result, telephone interviewing was adopted, accompanied by a substantial reduction of completed interviews, with just over 10,000 achieved. In the most recent survey, the sample size was over 16,000 households (over 27,000 adults). The ongoing target is for 20,000 households (over 33,000 adults) to be interviewed each year.

In recent years, the mean time of an interview is approximately 1 hour long. The questions deal with a very broad range of topics:

- Income topics, including working or not; type of work; earnings, tax and national insurance; other wage details; self-employed earnings; Pensions, including personal and company (occupational) pension schemes; state pensions; all state benefits, including Universal Credit and Pension Credit;
- Child topics, including children in education; free school milk and meals; childcare used including nurseries; children's health or disability; and any children's earnings;
- Household topics, including characteristics (family composition, and renting or owning); housing costs including Council Tax, rent or mortgage payments, insurance, water and sewerage rates;
- Health topics, including the nature of any disability; health restrictions on work; informal care (given and received);
- Other topics, including educational grants and loans; income from grants, trusts, royalties and allowances, maintenance and other sources; savings, interest and dividends; types of assets; types of debts; food security; food bank usage; material deprivation indicators.

The FRS is designated by the UK Statistics Authority as "Accredited Official Statistics" (known formerly as "National Statistics"). This means that the FRS has been assessed by the Office for Statistics Regulation as meeting the necessary standards of trustworthiness, quality and value.

From the survey year 2024 to 2025, the FRS adopts an improved approach by using administrative data instead of survey responses for major state benefits and tax credits. The same approach has also been applied to all survey years from 2021 onwards.

== Methodology and scope ==
Interviews are usually carried out on a face-to-face basis in the home, with telephone interviewing permissible in order to maximise household participation. Wherever possible, all adult residents aged 16 and older are interviewed. The reference period is based on the financial year (April to March) with interviews taking place at all times during the year. Only a single interview takes place i.e. there is no revisit or ‘wave’ aspect to the FRS.

Several steps are taken to ensure that the achieved sample is nationally representative. These include: stratification of the issued sample, to ensure an even spread of richer versus poorer areas; and weighting of the achieved sample, via several control factors, to ensure an even spread of Council Tax bands and ages of respondents.

Within that framework, the areas selected for the FRS is made at random. Any postcode in the United Kingdom might be selected for the FRS.

Households who take part receive a £10 Post Office voucher, as a token of appreciation. Note that the survey sample excludes those living in communal settings (hostels, student halls of residence, care homes, prisons and the like) as they are not "private" households.

== Survey results ==
The FRS data is released annually, around February/March, at GOV.UK. The exact release date will be indicated at GOV.UK with four or more week's notice.

The most recent results were published on March 26 2026, based on interviews between April 2024 and March 2025.

The release includes a comprehensive Background & methodology section, Quality assessment report, and also a statistical report. The report has several chapters which highlight the breadth of information the FRS collects, as well as changes since the previous year's release. The chapters included are: Income and State Support, Tenure (including housing costs), Disability, Carers, Pensions, Savings & Investments, Self-Employment, Household Food Security and Food Bank Usage, and Childcare.

DWP reviews the survey results and uses the data from the FRS in its Policy Simulation Model (PSM) in order to evaluate existing policies and costing policy options. Furthermore, the FRS supplies data which is incorporated in the analysis of patterns of benefit receipt and benefit forecasting.

== Accessing FRS statistics and data ==
The FRS data can be accessed via Stat-Xplore. This allows users to create their own tables of FRS results.

FRS microdata is publicly available to download from the UK Data Archive.

FRS microdata can also be accessed by the ONS’ secure research service (and its successor, the Integrated Data Service).

== Onward uses and related publications ==
The FRS is the basis of a number of other DWP Accredited Official Statistics (known formerly as 'National Statistics'):

- Households Below Average Income(including ‘the child poverty statistics’)
- Pensioners' Incomes statistics
- Income-Related Benefits: Estimates of Take-up (‘the take-up statistics’)
- Separated Families statistics
