= Households Below Average Income =

Poverty statistics publication in the United Kingdom

Households below average income (HBAI) is an annual publication on poverty statistics in the United Kingdom. The data is based on the Family Resources Survey.

Poverty is defined as having an equivalised household income below the 60% median line.
