= State Pension (United Kingdom) =

Type of UK government pension

Old Age Pension Book Postal Order, 1909

The State Pension is a regular payment made by the UK government to people who have reached State Pension age. It is one part of the pension system in the United Kingdom, alongside workplace and personal pensions. Entitlement depends on a person's National Insurance contribution record rather than on their income or savings, and the amount paid depends mainly on when they reached State Pension age and how many qualifying years they have.

Which rules apply depends on when a person reached State Pension age. People who reached it on or after 6 April 2016 receive the new State Pension, a single flat-rate amount introduced by the Pensions Act 2014. For 2026–27 the full rate is £241.30 a week. At least ten qualifying years are normally needed to receive anything and 35 to receive the full rate. People who reached State Pension age before that date remain on the pre-2016 scheme, which closed to new pensioners in April 2016 and consists of a flat-rate basic State Pension (£184.90 a week for 2026–27) and an earnings-related additional State Pension. Transitional rules for contributions made before 2016, and past periods of contracting out, mean that many people on the new scheme receive more or less than the full rate.

Payments are normally increased each April. Under the "triple lock", the basic and new State Pension rise by the highest of average earnings growth, price inflation or 2.5 per cent. Increases are paid to pensioners living in the UK and in countries with which the UK has a reciprocal agreement; pensions paid to people living elsewhere, including Australia and Canada, are frozen at the rate first paid.

State Pension age was historically 60 for women and 65 for men. It was equalised at 66 in 2020, began rising to 67 in May 2026 and will reach 67 by 2028. A rise to 68 is legislated for 2044 to 2046, subject to periodic review.

The State Pension is administered by the Department for Work and Pensions in Great Britain and by the Department for Communities in Northern Ireland.

== History ==
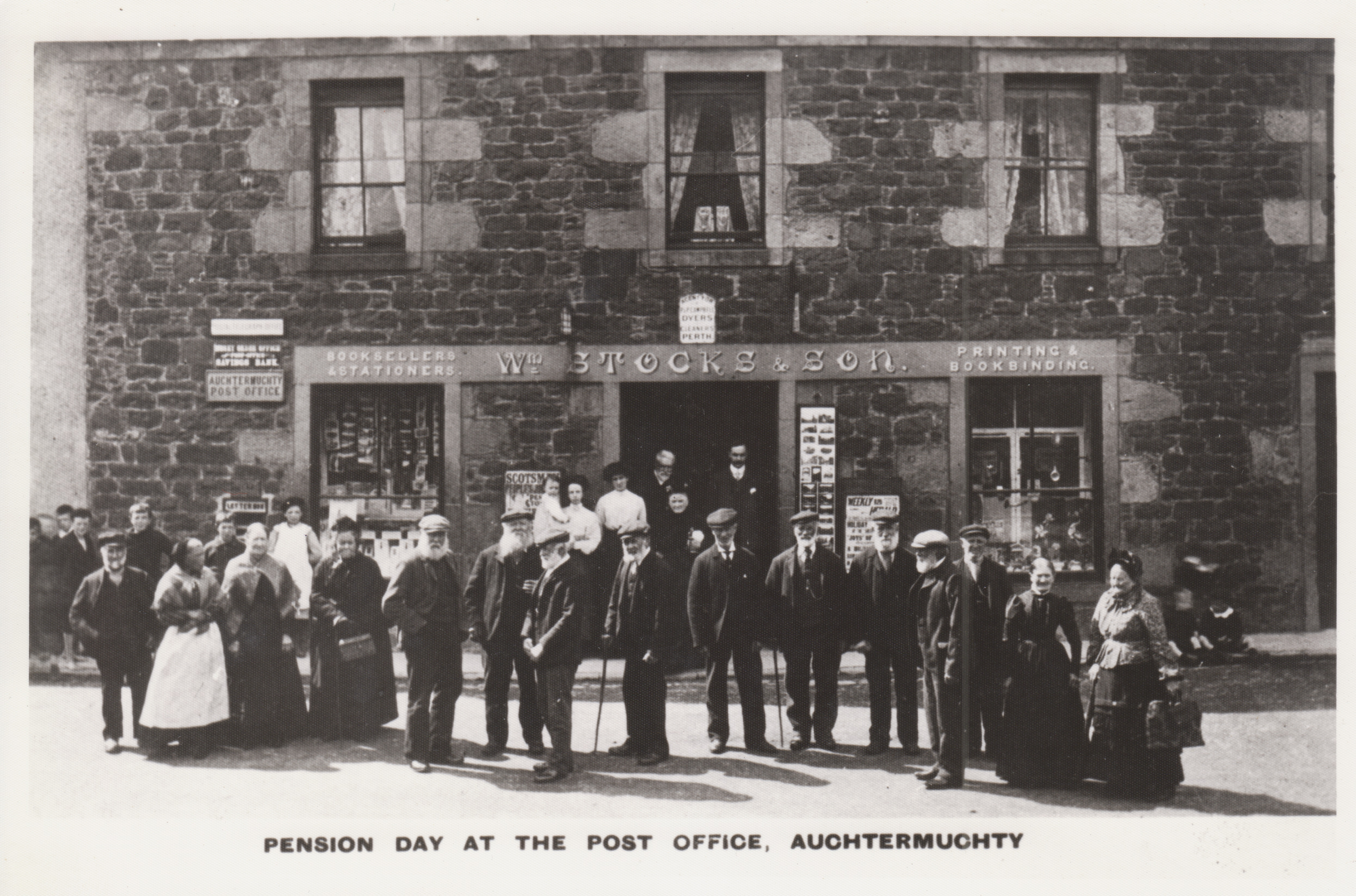
Pensioners collecting their pension in Auchtermuchty, Scotland, around the beginning of the twentieth century.

=== Origins ===
The first state pension in the UK was a means-tested, non-contributory pension for people aged 70 and over introduced by the Old-Age Pensions Act 1908. Contributory pensions from age 65 followed in 1925, and the National Insurance Act 1946 created a universal contributory retirement pension from 1948 as part of the post-war welfare state.

Before the National Insurance system changed in 1975, the contribution rules were different. To receive a pension, a person needed at least 3 years (156 weeks) of flat-rate contributions (2 years before July 1948), and a yearly average of 50 weekly contributions from age 16, from 5 July 1948, or from the date they began insurable employment.

=== Earnings-related additions (1961–2016) ===
An earnings-related element was added on top of the basic pension through a series of schemes: the Graduated Retirement Benefit from 1961 to 1975, the State Earnings-Related Pension Scheme (SERPS) from 1978, and the State Second Pension from 2002 until 2016. Employers and scheme members could "contract out" of these schemes, paying a lower rate of National Insurance in exchange for building up equivalent benefits in a workplace or personal pension.

Between 1978 and 2010, Home Responsibilities Protection (HRP) reduced the number of qualifying years needed by people who spent time out of paid work caring for children or disabled adults. It was replaced by National Insurance credits for parents and carers.

=== Pensions Act 2007 ===
Following the findings of the Pensions Commission and the 2006 white paper Security in retirement: towards a new pension system, the Pensions Act 2007 made the following changes:

1. Reduced the qualifying years for a full basic State Pension from 44 years for men and 39 years for women to 30 years for both, from April 2010.
2. Linked the yearly increase in the basic State Pension to earnings rather than prices.
3. Made it easier for everyone to build up some entitlement to the basic State Pension.
4. Replaced Home Responsibilities Protection with weekly credits for parents and carers.
5. Legislated to raise State Pension age for both women and men from 65 to 68 in three stages between 2024 and 2046.
6. Ended contracting out of the additional State Pension through money-purchase schemes.

The earnings link was replaced by the "triple lock" from April 2011 (see Annual increases).

=== Pensions Act 2014 and the new State Pension ===
A green paper in April 2011 and a white paper in January 2013 proposed replacing the basic and additional State Pension with a single flat-rate pension. It was originally planned for April 2017, but the 2013 Budget brought it forward to 6 April 2016. The Pensions Act 2014 received royal assent on 14 May 2014.

The new pension was initially described as a "single-tier" pension worth about £144 a week in 2012–13 terms. Rights already built up under the old scheme were preserved through the "starting amount" rules described below, and contracting out was abolished. Most rules allowing people to claim a pension on a spouse's or civil partner's record were phased out for people reaching State Pension age after the change, although existing rights were protected. The new State Pension began on 6 April 2016 at £155.65 a week.

== Qualifying for a State Pension ==
The State Pension is a "contribution-based" benefit. Entitlement depends on the number of qualifying years on a person's National Insurance record.

=== Qualifying years ===
A tax year counts as a qualifying year if a person pays, is treated as having paid, or is credited with enough contributions. For 2026–27, an employee needs earnings of at least £6,708 a year (the lower earnings limit), and a self-employed person needs profits of at least £7,105 (the small profits threshold). Employees earning between the lower earnings limit and the primary threshold pay no contributions but are treated as having paid them. Since April 2024, self-employed people with profits at or above the small profits threshold receive a qualifying year without paying Class 2 contributions, and those below it can pay Class 2 contributions voluntarily.

The number of qualifying years needed depends on when a person reached State Pension age:

Reached State Pension age	Years for full pension	Minimum years for any pension
Before 6 April 2010	44 (men), 39 (women)	A quarter of the full requirement
6 April 2010 to 5 April 2016	30	1
On or after 6 April 2016	35	10

=== National Insurance credits ===
People in certain circumstances receive National Insurance credits instead of paying contributions. These include parents claiming Child Benefit for a child under 12, carers looking after a severely disabled person for at least 20 hours a week, and people claiming or eligible for unemployment or sickness benefits.

=== Filling gaps with voluntary contributions ===
People with gaps in their record can usually fill them by paying voluntary Class 3 contributions, at £18.40 a week for 2026–27, normally for the previous six tax years. A temporary extension allowed gaps from April 2006 onwards to be filled until 5 April 2025.

People living abroad could previously pay the much cheaper voluntary Class 2 contributions. From 6 April 2026 this route was closed for periods abroad, except for some self-employed people covered by social security agreements and volunteer development workers. New applicants paying Class 3 for periods abroad must now have lived in the UK for at least 10 continuous years or have at least 10 qualifying years, replacing the previous three-year requirement.

== New State Pension (reached State Pension age from 6 April 2016) ==
The new State Pension applies to men born on or after 6 April 1951 and women born on or after 6 April 1953.

=== Amount ===
The full rate for 2026–27 is £241.30 a week (about £12,548 a year). People with between 10 and 35 qualifying years, and no National Insurance record before April 2016, receive a proportion of the full rate. Years beyond 35 do not increase the amount.

=== Starting amount and protected payment ===
Most people now reaching State Pension age have National Insurance records from before April 2016. For them, the Department for Work and Pensions calculated a "starting amount" at April 2016 under both the old rules and the new rules and used whichever was higher, after a deduction for any periods of contracting out.

- If the starting amount was below the full rate, each qualifying year after April 2016 adds about 1/35 of the full rate, until the full rate is reached or the person reaches State Pension age.
- If the starting amount was above the full rate, the excess is paid as a "protected payment" on top of the full rate. Protected payments are increased each year by price inflation rather than by the triple lock.

People who were contracted out often have a starting amount below the full rate, but should have offsetting rights in a workplace or personal pension reflecting the National Insurance rebate paid in the past.

=== Spouses and civil partners ===
The new State Pension is based on each person's own record and has no general equivalent of the old Category B pension. Limited transitional rules apply, such as for some married women who paid reduced-rate contributions, and a surviving spouse or civil partner may be able to inherit part of a partner's protected payment or additional pension where the marriage or civil partnership began before 6 April 2016.

== Old State Pension (reached State Pension age before 6 April 2016) ==
The pre-2016 scheme applies to men born before 6 April 1951 and women born before 6 April 1953. It is closed to new pensioners but continues to be paid to those already on it.

=== Basic State Pension ===
The full basic State Pension for 2026–27 is £184.90 a week. The amount is calculated by multiplying the full rate by the person's number of qualifying years and dividing by the number needed for the full rate (see Qualifying years).

=== Additional State Pension ===
Additional State Pension is paid on top of the basic pension and reflects earnings on which National Insurance was paid. It may include:

- Graduated Retirement Benefit, for contributions paid between April 1961 and April 1975. (Note: Entitlement was based on the amount of contributions paid, which bought units. Each unit was worth 17½p in 2024–25, and the maximum possible benefit was £15.10 a week.)
- SERPS, for employees who were not contracted out between April 1978 and April 2002.
- State Second Pension, from April 2002 to April 2016.
- State Pension top up, a short-lived scheme that let people reaching State Pension age before April 2016 buy extra additional pension with a lump sum between October 2015 and April 2017.

Additional State Pension is increased each year by price inflation rather than by the triple lock.

=== Pensions based on a spouse's record ===
A person whose own basic State Pension is less than 60 per cent of the full rate can have it topped up to that level using their spouse's or civil partner's record, once both have reached State Pension age. This is known as a Category B pension. It was originally available only to wives; men born after 5 April 1945, and civil partners reaching State Pension age on or after 6 April 2010, can also claim it. Widows, widowers and surviving civil partners may be able to inherit some or all of their late partner's pension.

=== Over-80 pension and age addition ===
People aged 80 or over with little or no contributory pension may qualify for a non-contributory Category D pension, paid at 60 per cent of the full basic State Pension, subject to residence conditions. An "age addition" of 25p a week is paid to all State Pension recipients aged 80 or over, at the same level since 1971.

== State Pension age ==
From the 1940s until April 2010 the State Pension age was 60 for women and 65 for men. Legislation since the mid-1990s has equalised the age for men and women and set a timetable for future increases, partly to reflect rising life expectancy and concerns about long-term affordability.

=== Legislative changes ===
The Pensions Act 1995 provided for women's State Pension age to rise to 65 between 2010 and 2020. The Pensions Act 2007 legislated for a rise to 68 for both sexes between 2024 and 2046. The Pensions Act 2011 brought forward women's equalisation at 65 to November 2018 and raised State Pension age for both men and women to 66 by October 2020. The Pensions Act 2014 brought forward the rise to 67 to between 2026 and 2028. The rise to 67 began on 6 May 2026 and will be complete in 2028.

=== Reviews ===
The Pensions Act 2014 requires the government to review State Pension age regularly, informed by an independent report and a report from the Government Actuary's Department.

- The first review, reported in 2017 and informed by John Cridland's independent report, recommended bringing the rise to 68 forward to 2037 to 2039. The government accepted the principle but said it would legislate only after a further review.
- The second review, concluded in March 2023 and informed by Baroness Neville-Rolfe's report, confirmed the rise to 67 between 2026 and 2028 but did not bring forward the rise to 68, leaving the 2044 to 2046 timetable in place.
- The third review was launched in July 2025, with an independent report by Suzy Morrissey and a Government Actuary's report on life expectancy. Any change to the timetable for 68 must give at least ten years' notice.

=== Women's State Pension age controversy ===
The increases in women's State Pension age, and the way they were communicated, have been the subject of sustained political and legal debate. Campaign groups, including Women Against State Pension Inequality (WASPI) and BackTo60, argue that some women born in the 1950s experienced a significant and unexpected increase in their State Pension age, which disrupted their retirement plans and caused financial hardship. Supporters of the policy point to the need to equalise State Pension ages for men and women and to respond to longer life expectancy and population ageing.

In 2019 a challenge in the High Court failed to reverse the decisions on the ground that not enough notice was given. The Conservative Party in its 2019 manifesto stated that it would not change the rules, while the Labour Party committed itself to compensating women who were unfairly affected. The Court of Appeal dismissed an appeal on 15 September 2020, and on 31 March 2021 the Supreme Court refused permission to appeal further.

On 21 March 2024 the Parliamentary Ombudsman recommended that affected women receive compensation of £1,000 to £2,950 each. In December 2024 the government accepted the finding of maladministration and apologised for the delay in writing to women directly, but rejected the Ombudsman's approach to injustice and remedy and announced that it would not introduce a compensation scheme.

=== State Pension age by date of birth ===
==== Women born between 1950 and 1953 ====
Dates of birth		Date of reaching SPA	Dates of birth		Date of reaching SPA
From	To	Date of reaching SPA	From	To	Date of reaching SPA
			6 Jan 1952	5 Feb 1952	6 Nov 2013
			6 Feb 1952	5 Mar 1952	6 Jan 2014
	5 April 1950	Age 60	6 Mar 1952	5 Apr 1952	6 Mar 2014
6 Apr 1950	5 May 1950	6 May 2010	6 Apr 1952	5 May 1952	6 May 2014
6 May 1950	5 Jun 1950	6 Jul 2010	6 May 1952	5 Jun 1952	6 Jul 2014
6 Jun 1950	5 Jul 1950	6 Sep 2010	6 Jun 1952	5 Jul 1952	6 Sep 2014
6 Jul 1950	5 Aug 1950	6 Nov 2010	6 Jul 1952	5 Aug 1952	6 Nov 2014
6 Aug 1950	5 Sep 1950	6 Jan 2011	6 Aug 1952	5 Sep 1952	6 Jan 2015
6 Sep 1950	5 Oct 1950	6 Mar 2011	6 Sep 1952	5 Oct 1952	6 Mar 2015
6 Oct 1950	5 Nov 1950	6 May 2011	6 Oct 1952	5 Nov 1952	6 May 2015
6 Nov 1950	5 Dec 1950	6 Jul 2011	6 Nov 1952	5 Dec 1952	6 Jul 2015
6 Dec 1950	5 Jan 1951	6 Sep 2011	6 Dec 1952	5 Jan 1953	6 Sep 2015
6 Jan 1951	5 Feb 1951	6 Nov 2011	6 Jan 1953	5 Feb 1953	6 Nov 2015
6 Feb 1951	5 Mar 1951	6 Jan 2012	6 Feb 1953	5 Mar 1953	6 Jan 2016
6 Mar 1951	5 Apr 1951	6 Mar 2012	6 Mar 1953	5 Apr 1953	6 Mar 2016
6 Apr 1951	5 May 1951	6 May 2012	6 Apr 1953	5 May 1953	6 Jul 2016
6 May 1951	5 Jun 1951	6 Jul 2012	6 May 1953	5 Jun 1953	6 Nov 2016
6 Jun 1951	5 Jul 1951	6 Sep 2012	6 Jun 1953	5 Jul 1953	6 Mar 2017
6 Jul 1951	5 Aug 1951	6 Nov 2012	6 Jul 1953	5 Aug 1953	6 Jul 2017
6 Aug 1951	5 Sep 1951	6 Jan 2013	6 Aug 1953	5 Sep 1953	6 Nov 2017
6 Sep 1951	5 Oct 1951	6 Mar 2013	6 Sep 1953	5 Oct 1953	6 Mar 2018
6 Oct 1951	5 Nov 1951	6 May 2013	6 Oct 1953	5 Nov 1953	6 Jul 2018
6 Nov 1951	5 Dec 1951	6 Jul 2013	6 Nov 1953	5 Dec 1953	6 Nov 2018
6 Dec 1951	5 Jan 1952	6 Sep 2013			

==== Men and women born between 1953 and 1960 ====
Dates of birth		Date of reaching SPA
From	To	Date of reaching SPA
6 Dec 1953	5 Jan 1954	6 Mar 2019
6 Jan 1954	5 Feb 1954	6 May 2019
6 Feb 1954	5 Mar 1954	6 Jul 2019
6 Mar 1954	5 Apr 1954	6 Sep 2019
6 Apr 1954	5 May 1954	6 Nov 2019
6 May 1954	5 Jun 1954	6 Jan 2020
6 Jun 1954	5 Jul 1954	6 Mar 2020
6 Jul 1954	5 Aug 1954	6 May 2020
6 Aug 1954	5 Sep 1954	6 Jul 2020
6 Sep 1954	5 Oct 1954	6 Sep 2020
6 Oct 1954	5 Apr 1960	Age 66

==== Men and women born between 1960 and 1978 ====
Dates of birth		SPA	Dates of birth		Legislated date of SPA
From	To	SPA	From	To	Legislated date of SPA
6 Apr 1960	5 May 1960	66 years 1 month	6 Apr 1977	5 May 1977	6 May 2044
6 May 1960	5 Jun 1960	66 years 2 months	6 May 1977	5 Jun 1977	6 Jul 2044
6 Jun 1960	5 Jul 1960	66 years 3 months	6 Jun 1977	5 Jul 1977	6 Sep 2044
6 Jul 1960	5 Aug 1960	66 years 4 months	6 Jul 1977	5 Aug 1977	6 Nov 2044
6 Aug 1960	5 Sep 1960	66 years 5 months	6 Aug 1977	5 Sep 1977	6 Jan 2045
6 Sep 1960	5 Oct 1960	66 years 6 months	6 Sep 1977	5 Oct 1977	6 Mar 2045
6 Oct 1960	5 Nov 1960	66 years 7 months	6 Oct 1977	5 Nov 1977	6 May 2045
6 Nov 1960	5 Dec 1960	66 years 8 months	6 Nov 1977	5 Dec 1977	6 Jul 2045
6 Dec 1960	5 Jan 1961	66 years 9 months	6 Dec 1977	5 Jan 1978	6 Sep 2045
6 Jan 1961	5 Feb 1961	66 years 10 months	6 Jan 1978	5 Feb 1978	6 Nov 2045
6 Feb 1961	5 Mar 1961	66 years 11 months	6 Feb 1978	5 Mar 1978	6 Jan 2046
6 Mar 1961	5 Apr 1977	67 years	6 Mar 1978	5 Apr 1978	68 years

== Annual increases ==
=== Triple lock ===
The basic and new State Pension are increased each April under the "triple lock", a Liberal Democrat policy adopted by the 2010–2015 coalition government and maintained by every government since. The increase is the highest of:

1. growth in average earnings, measured over May to July of the previous year;
2. price inflation, measured by the Consumer Price Index for the previous September;
3. 2.5 per cent.

The triple lock was suspended for the April 2022 increase, when the earnings element was removed because pandemic effects had distorted earnings figures. Recent increases have been 10.1% in 2023 (prices), 8.5% in 2024 (earnings), 4.1% in 2025 (earnings) and 4.8% in 2026 (earnings). Protected payments and additional State Pension are increased by prices only. The cost and fairness of the triple lock are the subject of continuing debate.

=== Pensioners living overseas ===
Increases are paid to pensioners living in the UK and in countries that have a social security agreement with the UK providing for uprating, including countries in the European Economic Area and the United States. Pensioners living in other countries, which include most Commonwealth countries such as Australia, Canada and New Zealand, have their pensions frozen at the rate in effect when they left the UK or when they first claimed, whichever is later.

== Claiming and deferring ==
The State Pension is not paid automatically and must be claimed. A person who does not claim at State Pension age, or who stops payment after claiming, defers their pension and receives a higher amount later.

Reached State Pension age	Increase	Equivalent per year	Lump sum option
Before 6 April 2016	1% for every 5 weeks deferred (minimum 5 weeks)	About 10.4%	Yes, after 12 months' deferral, with interest at 2% above Bank of England base rate
On or after 6 April 2016	1% for every 9 weeks deferred (minimum 9 weeks)	Just under 5.8%	No

The House of Commons Library has noted that around 8% of State Pensioners in Great Britain in 2019 were receiving an increment from deferring.

== Tax ==
The State Pension, including any deferral increase, is taxable income but is paid without tax deducted. With the personal allowance frozen at £12,570, the full new State Pension of about £12,548 a year in 2026–27 leaves little room before other income becomes taxable.

== Related payments ==
- Pension Credit is a means-tested benefit that tops up the income of low-income pensioners to a minimum level and can give access to other help, such as with housing costs.
- Winter Fuel Payment is an annual payment of £100 to £300 per person, depending on age and household, to help with heating costs. It was restricted to people on Pension Credit and certain other benefits in winter 2024–25. From winter 2025–26 it was again paid to everyone over State Pension age in England and Wales, but HMRC recovers it through the tax system from people with taxable income of more than £35,000. In Scotland it has been replaced by the Pension Age Winter Heating Payment.
- Christmas Bonus is a tax-free payment of £10 to State Pension recipients, unchanged since 1972.

== See also ==
- Pension Credit
- State Earnings-Related Pension Scheme
- State Second Pension
- Pension provision in the United Kingdom
- Women Against State Pension Inequality
- Frozen state pension
