= David Henshaw (administrator) =

Sir David Henshaw was the Chief Executive of Liverpool City Council, from 1998 to 2005. He was knighted in the 2004 Birthday Honours.

He was tasked with an investigation into administrative problems at the Child Support Agency in 2006. He was Chair of Alder Hey Children's NHS Foundation Trust from 2011 to 2014, after chairing NHS North West. He was Interim Chair at University Hospitals of Morecambe Bay NHS Foundation Trust in 2012-13.

In 2014, he was appointed interim Chair of Dorset HealthCare University NHS Foundation Trust, and subsequently chair of St George's University Hospitals NHS Foundation Trust.

David Henshaw is Chair of the Board of Directors at Wirral University Teaching Hospital NHS Foundation Trust.

As of 2024, he is chair of the board of Natural Resources Wales.
