= Cold weather payment =

UK government program

Cold weather payments are paid by the United Kingdom government to recipients of certain state benefits in the event of particularly cold weather in the winter.

The Social Fund Cold Weather Payments (General) Regulations 1988 govern the system under the Social Security Contributions and Benefits Act 1992. Each time the local temperature is less than 0 °C (32 °F) for seven consecutive days between 1 November and 31 March then a payment of £25 is made. This is in addition to the Winter Fuel Payment.

From 1 November 2022 Social Security Scotland has run a separate scheme, Winter Heating Payment to replace the Cold Weather Payment in Scotland. This is a £50 flat payment for those eligible, unconnected with the weather.
