= Handels-og Kontorfunktionaerernes Forbund I Danmark v Dansk Arbejdsgiverforening, acting on behalf of Danfoss =

Danfoss
- European Court of Justice

Submitted 05 April 1988 Decided 17 October 1989
- Full case name: Handels- og Kontorfunktionærernes Forbund I Danmark v Dansk Arbejdsgiverforening, acting on behalf of Danfoss
- Case: 109/88
- ECLI: ECLI:EU:C:1989:383
- Chamber: Full court
- Nationality of parties: Denmark

Court composition
- Judge-Rapporteur; R. Joliet
- President; O. Due
- Judges: M. Zuleeg; T. Koopmans; R. Joliet; J. C. Moitinho de Almeida; G. C. Rodriguez Iglesias; M. Diez de Velasco
- Advocate General; C. O. Lenz

Keywords
- Equality, pay

Handels-og Kontorfunktionaerernes Forbund I Danmark v Dansk Arbejdsgiverforening, acting on behalf of Danfoss (1989) C-109/88 is an EU labour law case, which held that if an employer is to justify indirect discrimination, measures taken must be directly related to being able to do the job.

== Facts ==
Pay in the workplace was set according to adaptability, training and seniority. The effect was that women were paid less.

== Judgment ==
ECJ held that adaptability to variable hours, place of work or training was justifiable only if these criteria were ‘of importance for the performance of specific tasks entrusted to the employee’. However, it also added that, ‘length of service goes hand in hand with experience and since experience generally enables the employee to perform his duties better, the employer is free to reward it without having to establish the importance it has in the performance of specific tasks entrusted to the employee’.
