= Winter Fuel Payment =

UK welfare payment for elderly people

The Winter Fuel Payment is a state benefit paid as an annual, tax free, lump sum payment in England and Wales, intended to cover the additional costs of heating over the winter months.

It is paid to those over state pension age, who do not opt out. Pensioners with annual earnings over £35,000, and not in receipt of pension credit, have the payment reclaimed by HMRC.

Most payments are made automatically in November or December.

Winter Fuel Payments are devolved in Scotland and Northern Ireland.

== Eligibility ==
Eligibility is based on a person’s date of birth and place of residence by the end of the qualifying week each year (the third full week of September, e.g. the week commencing 23 September 1958 for the winter 2024/2025).

A person must be above state pension age. Certain categories of people are excluded from receipt of the payment, including prisoners, people receiving long-term free hospital care, those with certain immigration issues, and care home residents in receipt of income-related benefits (such as pension credit).

Some living in the European Economic Area who moved prior to 31 December 2020 may also be eligible, given a “genuine and sufficient link to the UK’s social security system", such as having lived or worked in the UK.

== Value ==
In winter 2024/2025 the payment was £200 to £300 depending on circumstances.

The payment is greater for those aged 80 years and older, and a person living alone (or with those ineligible for the payment) is paid twice as much as a in a household where more than one person receives the payment. In particularly cold weather, a cold weather payment may also be made.

Historically, additional one-off payments have sometimes been made alongside through the Winter Fuel Payment for reasons other than fuel bill assistance, such as help with council tax bills in 2004/2005.

== History ==
=== Establishment ===
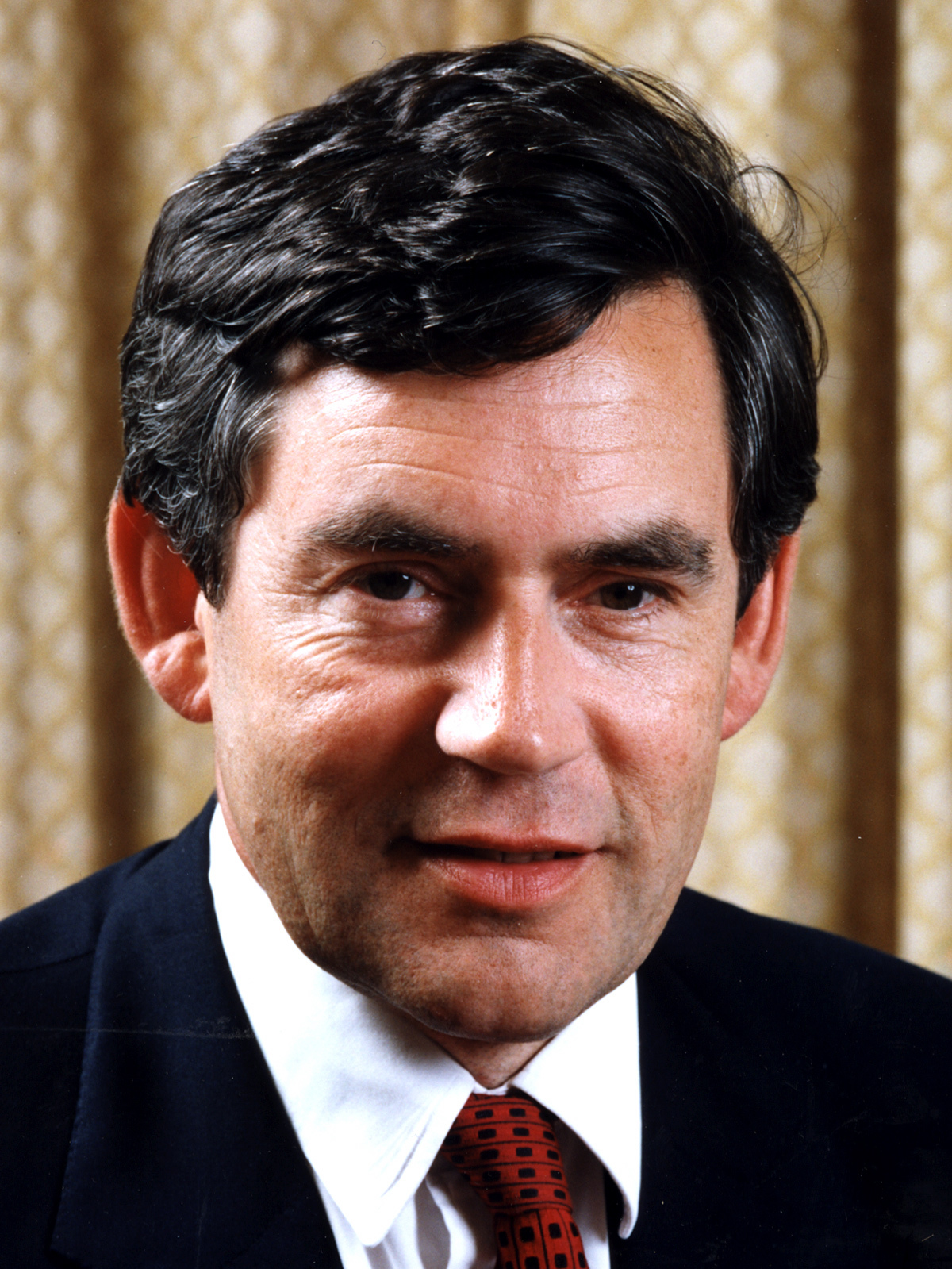
Gordon Brown (then chancellor) introduced the policy.

The payment was first introduced in 1997 as a universal benefit for pensioners, by chancellor Gordon Brown in his Pre-Budget Statement that year. Initially the qualifying age was 60, and the payment was a flat £20 per year, regardless of age. This was raised to £100 in 1999/2000, and £200 from 2000/2001. An additional £100 for households with someone aged 80 or over was first introduced in 2003/2004.

In winter 2011/12, the benefit cost the Cameron–Clegg coalition £2.1 billion and was paid out to 12.7 million people. In 2013, the former care services minister Paul Burstow criticised the universality, saying that "80% of older people do not require [the benefit]" and proposing that it be limited to pensioners in receipt of pension credit. He suggested that the £1.5 billion in annual savings be used to implement the findings of the Dilnot Commission into social care.

=== Conversion to a means-tested benefit ===
On 29 July 2024, Labour chancellor Rachel Reeves announced that the benefit would only be given to those in receipt of Pension Credit or other means-tested benefits. This removed the benefit from around 10 million pensioners.

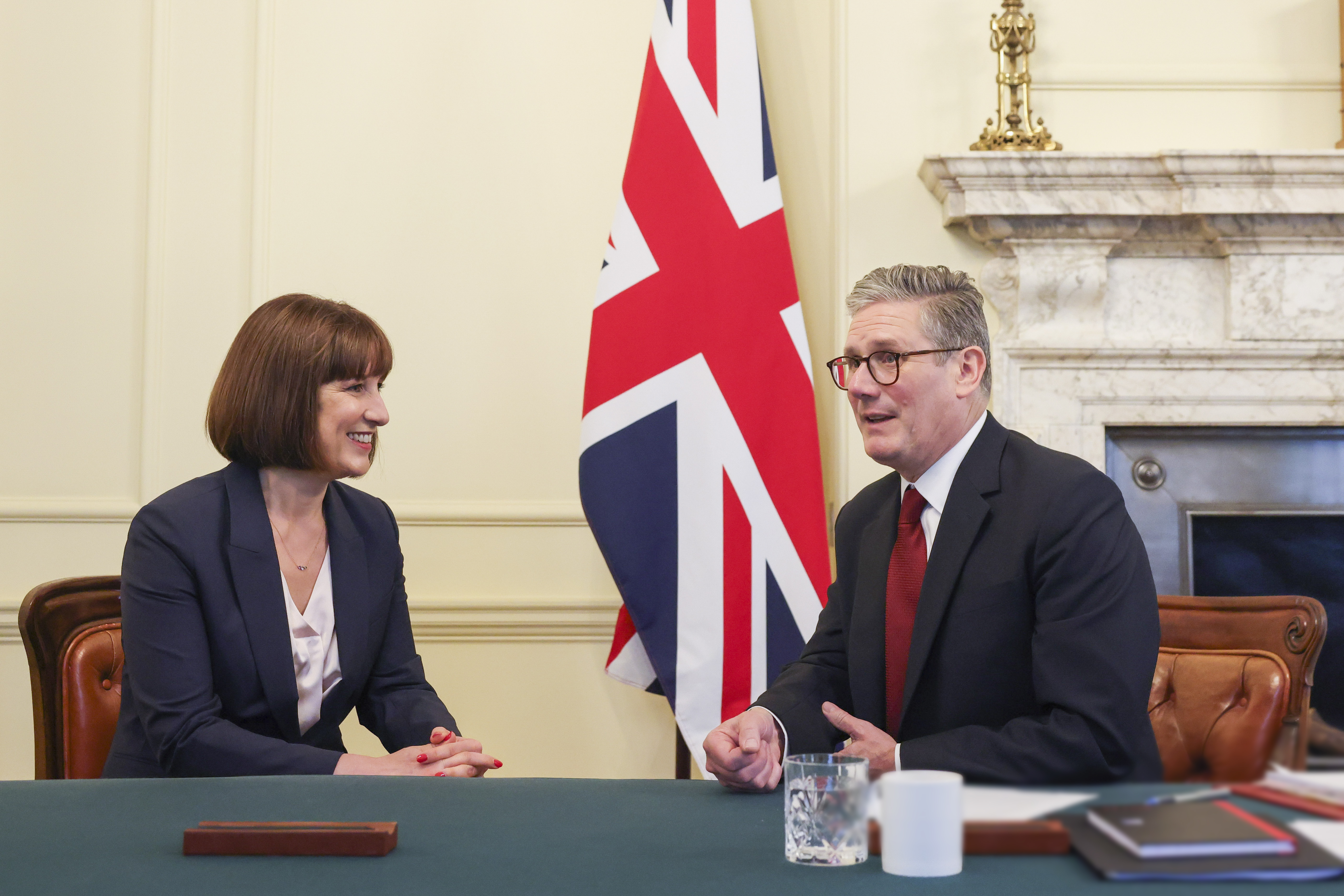
Rachel Reeves and Keir Starmer controversially changed the policy to a means-tested benefit in 2024.

The announcement of this policy to remove fuel payments from pensioners took the nation by surprise as it had not been publicised in advance or included in Labour's manifesto for the election. With the announcement being made shortly before the Commons party conference season recess, there was only a limited initial response. However, several Labour MPs returned to Westminster complaining that their constituents were "furious and, in some cases, deeply worried".

In August, consumer journalist and founder of MoneySavingExpert, Martin Lewis, suggested that the government should rethink their plans to restrict who would get the payment saying they had gone too far by limiting it to only the "absolute poorest pensioners on the very lowest income".

In June 2025, Reeves announced that, for the 2025/2026 winter, the payment criteria would be re-expanded to those not in receipt of pension credit, with recipients earning over £35,000 a year having the payment reclaimed automatically by HMRC.

==== Commons vote ====
By 5 September 2024, the prime minister, Keir Starmer, conceded to demands and promised a binding vote in the Commons on whether the changes to the fuel payment would be implemented. The change of heart came after unease amongst Labour MPs, with many of them signing an early day motion challenging the changes, and the opposition Conservative Party submitted a motion to annul the government's change to regulations. Labour MP Rachael Maskell said, "Being cold at home can lead to stroke, heart attack, hypothermia, pneumonia and other such illnesses" and recommended that the government should read the work of Professor Sir Michael Marmot and Sir Chris Whitty with respect to this "so that we can take a public health approach to people being warm at home, to mitigate the cost that could come without putting right mitigation around the winter fuel payments”.

The Conservative motion was debated on 10 September, and in the vote that followed, 348 MPs backed the government and 228 supported the opposition motion. With a majority of 120 to the government, the policy was implemented. A total of 52 Labour MPs, including 7 ministers, did not participate in the vote. Labour MP, Jon Trickett voted against the government. BBC News say that around 20 of the Labour MPs who did not participate had publicly expressed opposition to the policy previously.

==== Trade union opposition ====
The government was put under pressure to abandon this policy by the Trades Union Congress (TUC) as it started its annual conference on 9 September. The TUC general secretary, Paul Nowak, said that he was concerned about the removal of the universal payment for all but the poorest pensioners. The general secretary of Unite, Sharon Graham, repeated her call for the decision to be reversed. Fran Heathcote of the PCS union said that the plan was a "misstep" and it needed to be "put right".

At the Labour Party conference, held between 23 and 25 September, Unite and the Communication Workers Union, managed to reserve time for a motion opposing the government's fuel payment policy to be debated and a non-binding vote taken. The motion was scheduled to be debated on the first day of the conference, but on the day, the same day that Reeves was due to give a speech, the vote was postponed until the last day of the conference – after Starmer had left. The announcement of the move was greeted with loud boos and jeers from the conference attendees. The Unite union said that by rescheduling their motion to the very end of the conference, the conference organisers had sought to silence them. The Labour leadership lost the vote, with delegates supporting the motion to scrap the government's policy.

==== Pensioner impact concerns ====
On 9 September it was reported that Labour MPs, including frontbenchers, were worried that Reeves's "brutal" plan for the fuel allowance would result in more older people ending up in hospital over the winter.

The UK's leading charity for older people, Age UK, wrote to Reeves with its proposal which it says would prevent around two million pensioners, for whom the payment is badly needed, from having the payment stopped.

At Prime Minister's Questions on 11 September, the former prime minister, leader of the opposition, Rishi Sunak, accused Starmer of covering up the impact assessment for the policy, asking him if the estimate for the number of deaths was higher or lower than the 3,850 Labour had previously forecast would result from this policy. Starmer did not answer that question directly.

The Social Security Advisory Committee, a government watchdog, criticised the plan, said it was rushed and ill-conceived, and asked that urgent changes be made to it before the cold winter weather hits. It also said that Reeves's estimate that it would raise £1.5 billion per year was very likely a sizeable overestimate.

The general secretary of the National Pensioners Convention, one of the UK's largest organisations campaigning for older people, Jan Shortt, wrote to Reeves stating that, as a result of the policy changes, many older people may "not survive to see the spring or any other season". Shortt commented that not all pensioners receive a full state pension or have an occupational pension to rely on and called for the government to "step away from this ill-advised strategy immediately".

==== Legal challenges ====
On 25 October, a pensioner couple in Scotland were given permission to take legal action against the decision to restrict the payment by applying a means-test to it. They alleged that the UK and Scotland governments did not follow the correct procedure and did not conduct an appropriate consultation or an equality impact assessment before implementing the change. The hearing was scheduled to take place at the Court of Session in Edinburgh on 15 January 2025.

At the end of November, lawyers for Unite, the trade union, asked the High Court for an urgent judicial review of the policy. Unite, which had 200,000 members affected by the cuts, said the government should have been more thorough in gathering evidence of the likely impact prior to committing to the changes. They said they had members who struggled to get by on their pensions. Unite's general secretary, Sharon Graham, said the government had "brought something in without knowing what it is going to cost in terms of illness, what it is going to cost in terms of death".

==== Public opinion ====
Following the announcement of this policy, the Ipsos monthly tracker poll published in September showed that Starmer was more unpopular with the public than he had been for three years. 46% of voters had an unfavourable view of him. 32% of the poll's respondents had a favourable view of him, which was 6 points lower than it had been in August. The same poll showed Reeves being seen favourably had dropped 4 points since August to 23% and being seen unfavourably had increased by 9 points to 44%.

Following the commons vote, the results from a JL Partners/38 Degrees focus group of more than 100 people suggested that the new government was losing public support. The group comprised different age groups, regions, and voting intention. The most critical were older Labour voters, some younger voters were more sympathetic with the government's case, but most were critical of the policy.

A Savanta opinion poll commissioned by the Liberal Democrats party, and published on 29 October, found that 59% opposed the policy with 46% of Labour voters agreeing that Reeves was wrong to bring forward this policy while 35% agreed she was right. The poll also showed that 78% of people aged 55 and over said that Reeves should not cut the winter fuel payments.

==== Retaliation ====
Labour MP for the Blaydon and Consett seat, Liz Twist, faced calls from her constituents to resign from her post as chair of the board of trustees at Age UK Gateshead, a charity for older people. These came after she voted in the Commons to support Reeves's fuel payment restrictions. One of the constituents said "Given she [Twist] is a North East MP, representing one of the poorest parts of the country, I feel it’s very hypocritical for her to hold this position and it's disappointing that she did not vote against the removal of the Winter Fuel Payment". Age UK said it was "advocating against the government's decision". On 30 October 2024, Twist resigned, saying it was "because of the consistent pressure being placed on the charity by a number of people".

==== Knock-on effects ====
The Somerset Community Foundation (SCF) has said that donations to its "Surviving Winter" appeal are diminishing. The reason given is that it relied on people donating their unwanted winter fuel payments, and as those payments have now been scrapped for most pensioners, that source of income is no longer available. SCF, which started the fund in 2010, are now having to investigate other ways to raise money to help those who most need it.

Community Resource, a Shropshire-based charity supporting vulnerable residents estimates that its donations might be down by thousands of pounds due to Reeves's policy. The charity says that about 40% of its donations are from pensioners donating their winter payment.

In Workington, a thief convicted of stealing £350 from a male pensioner was spared a prison sentence in October after his lawyer told the court that the crime was no worse than that of Starmer in scrapping the winter fuel payment for pensioners.

The result of the 2025 Runcorn and Helsby by-election has been categorised as a stunning victory for Reform UK, as well as a major blow to Starmer, with many Labour MPs singling out the cuts to winter fuel payments as a significant factor in the party's defeat. Former shadow chancellor John McDonnell argued that recent government cuts had made voters feel that the party had turned its back on them. Richard Burgon, Labour MP for Leeds East, called the result "entirely avoidable". Starmer acknowledged that the result was disappointing but defended his government's decisions. Nigel Farage, leader of Reform UK, described the result as a "very big moment" for his party. He also attributed Labour's defeat to a loss of confidence in Starmer's governance, especially voter frustration on immigration. Labour's poor results in the 2025 local elections on the same day was also attributed to the cuts to winter fuel payments.

== In popular culture ==
"Freezing This Christmas"

Single by Sir Starmer and the Granny Harmers
- Released: 19 December 2024
- Recorded: 2024
- Genre: Christmas music
- Length: 3:35
- Songwriter: Chris Middleton

In December 2024, a parody of Mud's 1974 Christmas number one single "Lonely This Christmas" was released entitled "Freezing This Christmas", accompanied by a black and white music video. A backlash against the means-testing of the Winter Fuel Payment, it had lyrics by Chris Middleton, a freelance writer from Newcastle, and was performed by Dean Ager, a singer and Frank Sinatra and Michael Bublé impersonator, under the name Sir Starmer and the Granny Harmers, with all proceeds going to elderly charities. In the week before Christmas, the cover reached number one in the Singles Downloads Chart and number 37 on the singles chart. It was beaten for the Christmas number one by "Last Christmas" by Wham!. The BBC received criticism from Middleton, as well as Conservative MP Greg Smith, for not playing the song, with it being skipped on Radio One's chart show.
