= Pension Credit =

Welfare benefit in the United Kingdom

Pension Credit is the principal element of the UK welfare system for people of pension age. It is intended to supplement the UK State Pension, or to replace it (for example, if the claimant did not meet the conditions to claim a State Pension). It was introduced in the UK in 2003 by Gordon Brown, then Chancellor of the Exchequer. It has been subject to a number of changes over its existence, but has the core aim of lifting retired people of limited means out of poverty.

Eligibility may be estimated on a government website.

== Core elements ==
The scheme was introduced to replace the Minimum Income Guarantee, which had been introduced in 1997, also by Gordon Brown. This combined the existing applicable amount (of benefit) in Income Support, together with the Pensioner Premium, which was itself substantially increased; these changes gave the impression of a new, more generous benefit package aimed at pensioners.

Pension Credit has two elements:

- The first element, Guarantee Credit, is an income based benefit which is paid if the income of the applicant and partner (plus a notional income from savings) is below a certain level (£218.15 per week for a single person and £332.95 per week for a couple in 2024/25). The aim of Pension Credit is to establish the income of claimants from all sources and top it up to those amounts, if lower. However, some people with higher income may still be able to claim if they are disabled or carers.

The minimum age for claiming rose in line with the increase in women's retirement age (see State Pension age). Since September 2020 it has been 66, but it will continue to rise from 2026 onwards.

- The second element, Savings Credit, is only available to people who reached the state pension age before 6 April 2016. It is an inverse means-tested benefit: the higher the individual's private pension income, the more they receive in Savings Credit, up to a certain limit. Savings Credit was designed to reward people who saved for their retirement during their working life (and so provide a taper to Guarantee Credit). It therefore provides additional benefit to retired people who are not necessarily well-off, but do have savings or a personal pension, and may not qualify for the full Guarantee Credit. The maximum weekly amount of Savings Credit for 2020/21 was £13.97 for a single person, £15.62 for a couple.

The values of Guarantee Credit and Savings Credit are automatically uprated each year, in line with inflation, as are the basic State Pension and Second State Pension (S2P). However, they are uprated by different inflation measures:

- Retail Price Index (RPI) : basic State Pension,
- Consumer Price Index (CPI) : Second State Pension
- Increase in Average Earnings : Guarantee Credit, Savings Credit

The net, deliberate, effect of these differences is to make the total combined impact gradually converge, over about 40 years, to an eventual situation where the total benefit is around £170 a week, whatever an individual's circumstance. Consequently, the Coalition government proposed replacing this complex system with a single flat-rate pension of about £170 per week.

Savings Credit, which would be abolished by the flat-rate pension policy, is currently only claimed by around 1% of eligible individuals, and few people of eligible age are aware of its existence. As an interim measure, the Coalition government changed the uprating system, so that higher levels of income would be obtained automatically, instead of via Savings Credit:

- basic State Pension : a triple lock – whichever is larger of
  - CPI, or
  - the increase in Average Earnings, or
  - 2.5%
- Guarantee Credit : the amount necessary to remain below the basic State Pension by the same cash amount
- Savings Credit : reduced by the amount necessary to cover the funding for the increase in Guarantee Credit, above where it would be under the original uprating scheme

== Assistance with Council Tax ==
Anyone who was in receipt of the Guarantee Credit part of Pension Credit was also eligible for full Council Tax Benefit, which covered the cost of their Council Tax bill. Whilst Council Tax Benefit itself was abolished in 2013, a new system of benefit entitlement, known as Council Tax Reductions (marketed by many councils as Council Tax Support) was introduced. However, people in receipt of the Guarantee Credit element of Pension Credit (or who would meet the same qualifying rules) must continue to receive a 100% discount (that is, a Council Tax bill of £0).

== Assistance with rent ==
Anyone who was in receipt of the Guarantee Credit part of Pension Credit was also eligible for full Housing Benefit. This could be a significant amount, ensuring that a retired person in this position has their rent paid in full. However, the Coalition government proposed to change this rule in a substantial manner by abolishing Housing Benefit. It was intended that from October 2014, Pension Credit would gain a new core element for Housing costs comparable with the Housing Element of Universal Credit, for working-age benefit claimants. The Housing element would be based on Local Housing Allowance, in a similar manner to Housing Benefit, but payments would be incorporated within Pension Credit, rather than being a separate benefit claimed from the local council. It is not clear when, or if, this plan will be implemented.

== Impact of disabilities ==
As with Universal Credit, there is an additional Element available for people suffering from certain levels of disability. The additional amount is called Extra Amount for Severe Disability and amounts to £53.65 per week (in 2010/11 prices); as with most elements of Pension Credit, it is added to the core amount, and the whole thing is paid as a single weekly lump sum.

The Qualification criteria are relatively simple – the applicant, and/or their partner must be in receipt of:

- Attendance Allowance (a benefit only available to people of pension age)
- Disability Living Allowance (a benefit only available to people below pension age). To qualify, this benefit (DLA) must be being received at the middle or higher rate.
- Personal Independence Payment (the new replacement for DLA, for claimants of working age; within a few years, DLA will only be for children).

The rules are complex and there are exceptions; for example, no-one in the household must be claiming Carer's allowance for looking after the disabled individual (otherwise they would be being paid twice for the same thing). The government encourages people interested in claiming this element to contact the Pension, Disability and Carers Service via Gov.uk, or an agency with expertise in benefits, such as the Citizens Advice Bureau, or a respected charity like Age UK.

== Take up ==
According to Age UK more than a third of those entitled to claim Pension Credit fail to do so based on estimates of take-up from 2009/10. Up to 1.6 million of pensioners on average were missing out on an extra £1,700 a year. Following the announcement in July 2024 that the Winter Fuel Payment is to be restricted to those receiving Pension Credit, the number of Pension Credit applications rose by 145%. There was a backlog of 53,400 claims and only half of processed applications were approved.
