= State Earnings-Related Pension Scheme =

UK Government pension arrangement, 1978–2002

The State Earnings Related Pension Scheme (SERPS), originally known as the State Earnings Related Pension Supplement, was a UK Government pension arrangement, to which employees and employers contributed between 6 April 1978 and 5 April 2002, when it was replaced by the State Second Pension.

Employees who paid full Class 1 National insurance contribution between 1978 and 2002 earned a SERPS pension. Members of occupational pension schemes could be "contracted out" of SERPS by their employer, in which case they and the employer would pay reduced NI contributions, and they would earn virtually no SERPS pension.

== General principle ==
The purpose of the scheme was to provide a pension related to earnings, in addition to the basic state pension.

The principle was that everyone would receive a SERPS pension of 25 per cent of their earnings above a "lower earning limit" (approximating to the amount of the basic state pension). The scheme was phased in over twenty years so that those retiring before 1998 received a SERPS pension proportional to the number of years that they had made contributions to it. There was an "upper earning limit" of about seven times the lower earning limit, beyond which earnings were disregarded for NI contributions and calculation of SERPS pensions.

Under the Social Security Act 1986 the target SERPS pension was reduced from twenty five to twenty per cent of average earnings between the two limits. Pensions earned before 6 April 1988 were not reduced and the change was to be phased in for people retiring between 1999 and 2009.

== Detailed calculations ==
- The pension earned is calculated by taking the earnings between the lower earning limit and the upper earning limit in each tax year. This amount is referred to as ‘surplus earnings’.
- These ‘surplus earnings’ are then increased in line with national average earnings until the individual reaches state pension age.
- The earnings between 6 April 1978 and 5 April 1988 are then divided by 4 (to achieve the target of 25 per cent of earnings).
- The earnings between 6 April 1988 and 5 April 2002 are multiplied by a factor depending on the tax year state pension age is reached:

Tax year in which state pension age is reached (year ending 6 April)	Percentage of total surplus earnings
2000	25.0
2001	24.5
2002	24.0
2003	23.5
2004	23.0
2005	22.5
2006	22.0
2007	21.5
2008	21.0
2009	20.5
2010 or later	20.0

- The combined amount is divided by the number of complete tax years between April 1978 (or the first year in which the individual paid NI contributions if later) and the tax year the individual reaches state pension age.

== Contracting out ==
When the scheme was established, employers with final-salary pension schemes could choose to contract-out of SERPS, provided they gave scheme members a Guaranteed Minimum Pension. In return for opting out of SERPS the employer would pay reduced National Insurance contributions.

In 1988 members of money purchase pension schemes were allowed to opt out for the first time. Instead of providing a Guaranteed Minimum Pension these schemes had to pay the saving in National Insurance contributions into the pension arrangement. To encourage the take-up of this arrangement the government made an extra incentive payment into each pension scheme where somebody contracted out using this route.

According to the Financial Services Authority, many policy holders who contracted out of the state pension may have been victims of SERPS Pension Mis-selling and lost funds that deserve compensation. Hence an investigation was launched to investigate the claims that millions of employees had been led astray with the advice to contract out of SERPS.

As the government began to question the long-term affordability of SERPS, they offered incentives to encourage people to opt out of SERPS into an Appropriate Personal Pension (APP). The rebates offered by the government as incentives to opting out have since been cut, causing many to question whether it was misleading to encourage people to opt out, as many are now being advised to opt back in.

Ultimately, investigations have shown that mis-sold pensions affected some, but not others. For some, returning to the state pension is a favourable option, but for others in different financial circumstances and with different financial needs, the APP option is also beneficial.

== After 2002 ==
In April 2002 SERPS accrual ended and was replaced by the State Second Pension. The main reason for the change was to provide a larger pension to people of low earnings.

From April 2016 the old Basic State Pension plus Additional State Pension (SERPS, State Second Pension and Graduated Retirement Benefit) were replaced by the New State Pension.
