= State Second Pension =

Social program in the UK

The State Second Pension (S2P), or Additional State Pension, was introduced in the UK by the Labour Government on 6 April 2002, to replace the SERPS (State Earnings-Related Pension Scheme). The main aim of this change was to skew existing Additional Pension (AP) benefits in favour of low and moderate earners at the expense of higher earners and to extend access to include certain carers and people with long-term illness or disability for the first time.

The Additional State Pension was replaced for new pensioners by the new State Pension on 6 April 2016.

== Differences between SERPS and S2P ==
Before April 2002, AP was provided through the State Earnings-Related Pension Scheme, (SERPS). SERPS was a career average pension scheme, based on the band of earnings each year between a "LEL" or '"Lower Earnings Limit"' (£5,304 in 2011/12) and a "UEL" or '"Upper Earnings Limit"' (£42,475 in 2011/12). Any SERPS entitlement already built up is retained and revalued each year in line with the changes in average earnings (that is, in "real" terms) until State Pension Age. It is then added to any Basic State Pension payable, and the combined amount uprated thereafter in line with the index of retail prices (RPI).

S2P gives all employees earning up to £32,592 a year (in 2011/12) a larger pension than SERPS, regardless of whether they are "contracted out" or not – with most help going to those in the '"lowest"' earnings (up to £14,400 a year in 2011/12) – known as the "LET" or '"Low Earnings Threshold"'. The accrual rates within each band of earnings are:

Earnings	LEL to LET	LET to (3LET - 2LEL)	(3LET - 2LEL) to UEL
(2011/12)	£5304 - £14,400	£14,400 - £32,592	£32,592 - £42,475
SERPS	20%	20%	20%
S2P	40% (of £14,400 - £5304)	10%	20%

Earnings in the lowest band are treated as though they were actually at the threshold of the next band. Thus, under SERPS, earnings of £10,000 a year would produce a pension of just £939 a year - 20 per cent of (£10,000 - £5,304) – whereas under S2P the same earnings would lead to a pension of £3,638 a year – 40 per cent of (£14,400 - £5,304) – nearly four times as much. However, under SERPS earnings of £25,000 a year would produce a pension of £3939 a year – 20 per cent of (£25,000 - £5,304) - but under S2P only £4,698 a year – 40 per cent of £9,096 plus 10 per cent of (£25,000 - £14,400). At the "3 × LET - 2 × LEL" threshold (£32,592 a year) SERPS and S2P pensions are equal and the same rate of accrual (20 per cent) applies above that.

These percentages are the entitlement of employees who have contributed to the scheme for a full working life. This is defined as the number of years between age 16 and State Pension Age. If the employee was over age 16 on 6 April 1978, their working life is defined as the number of years between 6 April 1978 and their State Pension Date.

== Contracting out ==
If an employed earner had annual earnings above the LEL they become part of State Pension scheme, and must pay some National Insurance contributions. However, they could choose to leave the Additional Pension element of the State Pension by joining a private pension scheme or holding a private pension plan instead. This was called "contracting out". There were two kinds of contracting out concerning the Additional Pension (SERPS/S2P).

Through a 'contracted-out employment' (SERPS only) scheme

If chosen to contract out by joining an employer's occupational pension scheme, both the employee and their employer paid reduced-rate National Insurance contributions.

When the employee retires their second pension then comes partly from the employer's scheme (deemed funded from the lower rate of contributions collected being diverted to this purpose) rather than the Additional Pension, although most people will continue to build up some entitlement to AP at the same time. Because they will continue to pay some National Insurance, such employees will receive the difference between the higher level of the S2P and the lower level of SERPS which they have contracted out from when they come to draw on their State Pension. This form of contracting-out lasts as long as the individual remains a member of the employer's scheme – usually as long as they remain in a particular job. Once they leave a job, and resume employment elsewhere, they default to being 'contracted in', unless moving directly to contracted-out employment elsewhere.

Through an 'appropriate pension' (S2P, including SERPS) plan

A person could also contract out of Additional Pension with a stakeholder pension or a personal pension plan which they may nominate. This vehicle was then known as an 'appropriate personal pension', or APP. If they did this, instead of their paying lower National Insurance contributions, once a year HM Revenue & Customs paid directly into their APP a rebate, sometimes known as a 'minimum contribution'. This rebate is intended to provide benefits broadly the same as the Additional Pension given up – that is, full S2P. Its value is therefore determined by reference to the individual's age and level of earnings that year but not directly by how much they may pay in National Insurance in that particular year. This second form of contracting out occurs one (tax) year at a time – each year the individual has the option to elect to contract back into the full S2P Additional Pension. Where an employee earns less than the LET (£9,000 for instance) their rebate will be based on their actual band earnings (£9,000 - £4,368) so that they would still receive some S2P through their State pension later – equivalent to the difference remaining (here, £12,500 - £9,000).

If an individual chose this sort of second pension, in lieu of being 'contracted-in', it should give them roughly the same amount one would get from the Additional Pension. Whether it does or not rests on the investment returns from the rebate being sufficient to purchase additional income (usually in the form of an annuity.) One may still need to think about whether this predetermined level of pension would be enough to support the lifestyle one had planned when they retired.

It was also possible to use a stakeholder pension or a personal pension plan to build up retirement funds without contracting out of the Additional Pension, but if this was done, there was no rebate. A person will usually get tax relief on all their contributions into a private pension at the basic rate of income tax (22 percent in the 2006/07 tax year) irrespective of income tax actually paid. If they have paid income tax at the higher rate (40 per cent in 2006/07) also, their contributions are relieved at this rate, but only against that income on which the higher rate was paid.

=== Relative merits of contracting out ===
With SERPS and S2P, although the National Insurance rebate was intended to provide benefits broadly the same as the Additional Pension given up, there was controversy over whether the rebates were sufficient based on then projections for investment returns and annuity rates. Many IFAs and Personal Pension providers encouraged some or all of their customers to contract back in.

Those who contracted in gained the security of a known pension level which was not determined by investment returns or annuity rates but lost the flexibility to take their pension before state pension age, or receive a tax-free lump sum payment on retirement.

One advantage of contracting out was that the funds were invested privately on behalf of the individual. This meant that they were protected against future government changes to the pension system.

== Help for lower earners ==
As previously stated, this comes from

- Treating all low earners as though their earnings were at least £12,500 (2006/07) for entitlement purposes
- Giving this level of earnings a higher 'value' than the same earnings had under SERPS (40% compared to 20% accrual)
- Extending the right to S2P, at this level, to groups not previously included (which had only been eligible for Basic State Pension)

== New State Pension ==
In 2006 the government announced changes to both the Basic and the Additional Pension. Specifically, it was announced that

- Contracting out through APPs would be discontinued from 2012. Thereafter contracting out would only be available through an employer
- S2P would gradually cease to be 'earnings related' [Note it is only slightly so for low to moderate earners currently anyway] and become 'flat rate'. It was stated that the flat rate of S2P would be about £1.40 per week (£73 pa) in current real value for each year's membership. [Note that S2P is earned in every year of a full working lifetime – these amounts would therefore be multiplied by years 'in-service' in arriving at the final entitlement]
- Entitlement to a 'full' Basic State Pension would, separately, become easier – requiring just thirty qualifying years from April 2010, instead of the 39 (women) or 44 (men) previously. [Note this 'full pension' does not include Additional Pension rights, like those from S2P, and AP will still effectively accrue over the much longer period of a full working lifetime (50+ years)]
- State Pension Age would be raised approximately one year per decade from the (harmonized) age 65 in 2023 to 66, then 67 and then 68. [Note this delays the age at which Additional Pension included in State Pension would be payable also – but that any AP built up separately through contracting out may now be claimed at any age between 55 and 75 – as part of the individual's own private or occupational pension arrangements]

== See also ==
- Pensions in the United Kingdom
- Personal pension schemes
- Stakeholder pension schemes
