= Tavarekere Kalliah Chandrashekar =

Indian bioinorganic chemist

- Born: 1 January 1956 (age 70); Karnataka, India
- Education: University of Mysore; Indian Institute of Science; University of Massachusetts; Michigan State University; University of Cologne
- Known for: Studies on macrocyclic systems
- Awards: 2000 CRSI Bronze Medal; 2001 Shanti Swarup Bhatnagar Prize; 2002 Professor P. Ray Memorial Award; 2003Chemito Award; 2008 CRSI Silver Medal
- Scientific career
- Fields: Bioinorganic chemistry
- Workplaces: Indian Institute of Technology, Kanpur; National Institute of Science Education and Research; National Institute for Interdisciplinary Science and Technology
- Doctoral advisor: V. Krishnan; Hans van Willigen; G. T. Babcock

Tavarekere Kalliah Chandrashekar (born 1956) is an Indian bioinorganic chemist and a former director of the National Institute for Interdisciplinary Science and Technology, a CSIR subsidiary. He was appointed the director of the National Institute of Science Education and Research, Bhubaneswar where he continues as a senior professor at the department of chemical sciences. He is known for the discovery of novel macrocyclic systems and is an elected fellow of the Indian National Science Academy, National Academy of Sciences, India and the Indian Academy of Sciences. The Council of Scientific and Industrial Research, the apex agency of the Government of India for scientific research, awarded him the Shanti Swarup Bhatnagar Prize for Science and Technology, one of the highest Indian science awards, in 2001, for his contributions to chemical sciences.

== Biography ==
National Institute for Interdisciplinary Science and Technology

T. K. Chandrashekar, born on the New Year's Day of 1956 in the Indian state of Karnataka, did his college studies at the University of Mysore from where he completed his graduate and master's courses. His doctoral studies were at the Indian Institute of Science under the guidance of V. Krishnan on bioinorganic chemistry and after securing a PhD in 1982, he moved to the US where he did his post-doctoral studies at the laboratories of Hans Van Willigen of the University of Massachusetts, Boston (1982–84) and G. T. Babcock at Michigan State University (1984–86). Before returning to India, he did research for one year as an Alexander von Humboldt Fellow with E. Vogel at the University of Cologne. His Indian career started at the Indian Institute of Technology, Kanpur as a lecturer in 1986 where he spent 17 years before joining the National Institute for Interdisciplinary Science and Technology (NIIST), a CSIR subsidiary, as the director in 2003. Six years later, he was appointed the director of National Institute of Science Education and Research, Bhubaneswar where he continues as a senior professor at the department of chemical sciences.

== Legacy ==
Chandrashekar is credited with the discovery of expanded porphyrins-based macrocyclic systems which had the ability to bind and transport anions and transition metal cations. Using physico-chemical techniques, he elucidated the electronic structure of those macro cycles. He also worked on photodynamic therapy, photosynthetic intermediates and supramolecular systems for molecular devices. He has published his researches by way of several peer-reviewed articles; the online article repository of the Indian Academy of Sciences has listed 103 of them. He has served as the project investigator for 12 projects by scientific agencies such as Department of Science and Technology, Department of Atomic Energy and Council of Scientific and Industrial Research and has guided 26 master's and 17 doctoral scholars in their studies. As the director of National Institute for Interdisciplinary Science and Technology, he is known to have made notable changes in the structure of the organization by establishing five independent divisions and establishing High-resolution transmission electron microscopy and 500 MHz Nuclear magnetic resonance facilities. He has also been involved with the administration of Indian National Science Academy and the Indian Academy of Sciences as a member of their councils during 2009-11 and 2013-15 respectively. He also served as a secretary at the DST.

== Awards and honors ==
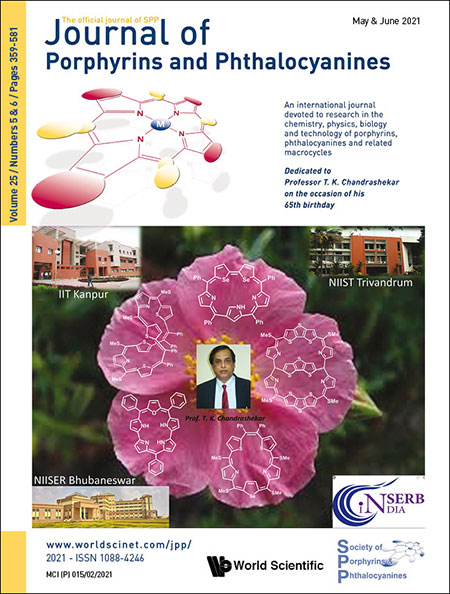
Cover page of Journal of Porphyrins and Phthalocyanines Special Issue

Chandrashekar received the Bronze Medal of the Chemical Research Society of India in 2000; the society would honour him again with the Silver Medal in 2008. The Council of Scientific and Industrial Research awarded him the Shanti Swarup Bhatnagar Prize, one of the highest Indian science awards, in 2001. He received the Professor Priyadaranjan Ray Memorial Award of the Indian Chemical Society in 2002, followed by the Chemito Award the next year. Holder of the J. C. Bose National Fellowship in 2006, he was elected by the National Academy of Sciences, India as their fellow in 1996 and he became an elected fellow of the Indian Academy of Sciences in 1996 and the Indian National Science Academy in 2003. In 2021, on the occasion of his 65th birthday, a special issue of the Journal of Porphyrins and Phthalocyanines was dedicated to honouring T. K. Chandrashekar for his outstanding contributions in the field of porphyrinoids. Sixty scholar-contributors around the world, including Karl M. Kadish and Atsuhiro Osuka, submitted their research papers to be published in this special issue.

== See also ==
- Porphyrins
- Photodynamic therapy
