= Broadfield Stadium =

Football stadium

- The Broadfield
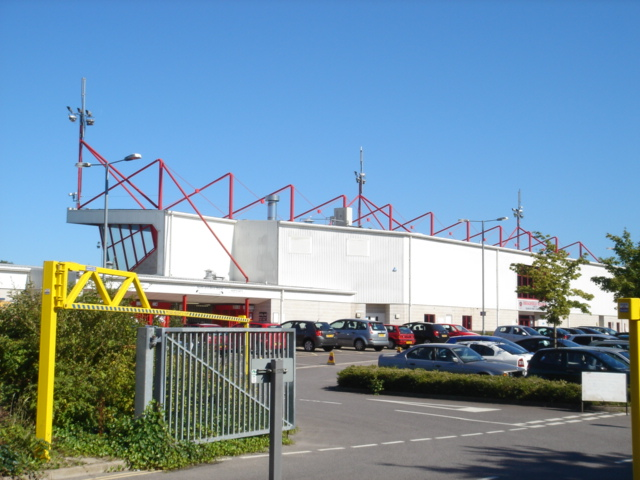
- Interactive map of Broadfield Stadium
- Full name: The Broadfield Stadium
- Former names: The Checkatrade.com Stadium, The People’s Pension Stadium
- Address: Winfield Way, Crawley, RH11 9RX; United Kingdom
- Location: Crawley, Sussex, En134152
- Coordinates: 51°05′59″N 0°11′41″W
- Owner: Crawley Borough Council
- Operator: Crawley Town Football Club
- Capacity: 6,134
- Surface: Grass
- Scoreboard: Digital scoreboard on the North Stand
- Field size: 112 x 72 yards
- Public transit: Crawley Railway Station Broadfield Stadium Bus Stop

Construction
- Built: 1997
- Opened: 1997

Tenants
- Crawley Town F.C. (1997–); Brighton & Hove Albion W.F.C. (2018–)

Website
- https://www.crawleytownfc.com/

The Broadfield Stadium is a multi-purpose stadium in Crawley, West Sussex, England. It is currently used mostly for football matches and is the home ground of Crawley Town F.C., Brighton & Hove Albion W.F.C. and the Sealand national football team. The stadium has a capacity of 6,134 people, and is owned by Crawley Borough Council.

Between 2013 and 2018, the stadium was named the Checkatrade.com Stadium for sponsorship purposes. In late 2018 it was renamed The People's Pension Stadium as part of a new sponsorship deal. For the 2022/23 Season, the stadium has reverted to being named the Broadfield Stadium.

== History ==
Crawley Town FC spent 48 years at its Town Mead home until the land was sold to developers in 1997. The club then moved to the Broadfield Stadium, about two miles across town.

In January 2012 the application for the new 2,000-seater East Stand (and facilities including new turnstiles and Premier League standard flood lights) was accepted by Crawley Borough Council. The upgrade is required to meet the league rules which require a minimum 5,000 capacity stadium. After just one week of construction, the new East Stand was completed on 2 April 2012, bringing the total capacity of the Broadfield Stadium to 5,500. Upon completion, Crawley's first game with the new stand was against League Two side Crewe Alexandra on 6 April. The match ended in a 1–1 draw, with a new record crowd of 4,723, the previous best being 4,522.

The record attendance reached 5,572 on Saturday 7 October 2023 when Crawley Town hosted Wrexham in League Two.

== Stands ==
=== West Stand ===
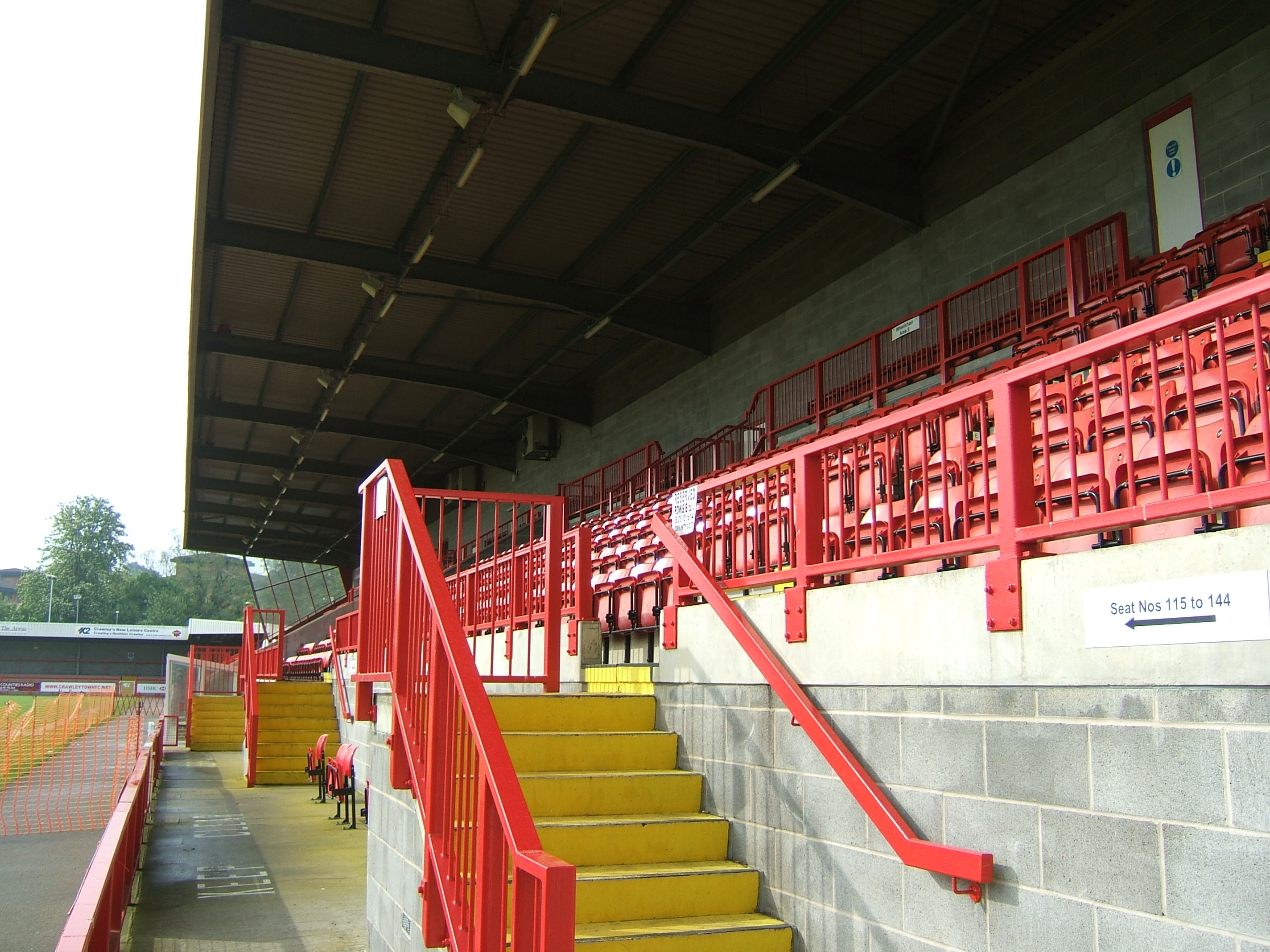
Broadfield Stadium - West stand

The West Stand is the main stand, running two-thirds of the length of the pitch. It contains club offices, merchandise shop, changing rooms and hospitality. It is raised above pitch level meaning that fans have to climb a small flight of stairs at the front to enter the seated area. Prior to the building of the East Stand, it was the only stand in the stadium to contain seats and a small section at the north end of the stand was available to away supporters. It is now entirely for home support.

=== North and South Stands ===
The North Stand and South Stand are two identical small roofed terraces. The South Stand contains the most vocal home support and the North Stand is allocated to away fans. Both stands curve around the corners of the pitch to meet up with the West Stand. The South Stand has been known as the Structured Communications Stand since December 2015.

=== East Stand ===
The East Stand is an all-seated roofed stand with a capacity of 2,122. It is mainly for home fans although some seats at the north end of the stand are available to away supporters. The stand opened for the first time on Good Friday 2012 for the League Two home game against Crewe Alexandra.

The stand was planned following promotion to the Football League in May 2011, to comply with Football League regulations. Work on the East Stand of the stadium started in early February 2012. It replaced the uncovered East terrace which was a standing area. Between 2013 and 2015 it was known as the Checkatrade.com Stand but was renamed The People's Pension East Stand in December 2015 due to a sponsorship deal with B&CE.

== Location ==
The stadium is located in Broadfield, Crawley. Next to a roundabout about a mile from Crawley railway station and two miles from Three Bridges railway station, which is on the Brighton Main Line. The roundabout has a large white and red football in the centre and is at the end of the Brighton Road, which is easy to find from junction 11 on the M23 motorway.
