= NEST =

NEST may refer to:

- National Employment Savings Trust, a British workplace pension scheme
- National Entrance Screening Test, an Indian college entrance examination
- National Training Institute of Education, Science and Technology, a Korean training institute
- Near East School of Theology, a theological seminary in Beirut, Lebanon
- NEST (software), a neural simulation tool
- Non-biological Extraterrestrial Species Treaty, a fictional military alliance in Transformers: Revenge of the Fallen
- Northland Emergency Services Trust, a New Zealand emergency rescue organisation
- Novell Embedded Systems Technology, a software product for embedded systems
- Nuclear Emergency Support Team, a United States radiological incident response group

== See also ==
- Nest, a structure built by animals for holding eggs
- Nest (disambiguation)
