= Master trust =

Multi-employer occupational pension scheme

A master trust in the UK is a multi-employer occupational pension scheme.

== Structure ==
Traditionally, a trust based pension scheme is established by an employer for its employees. Representatives of that employer will then usually form the majority of the trustee board which is responsible for governing the trust. By contrast, a master trust is typically set up by a provider, often an insurance company. There is one legal trust and one trustee board, but a number of non-associated employers can participate in the scheme. Each participating employer will have one or more sections within the master arrangement. The trustee takes on governance responsibility for each section on things such as investment funds and service providers and will ensure compliance with regulatory duties. The decisions over benefit and contribution levels will normally remain with each participating employer.

== Running costs ==
It is normal for the sponsoring employer to cover the running costs of its trust based scheme, with members having some exposure to investment fees. Within master trusts it is usual for members to bear the majority of scheme costs. Some master trust providers may charge participating employers a set-up or implementation fee, but ongoing employer fees are unusual.

It is common for pension schemes in the UK to have fewer members than schemes in other nations meaning that they are less able to capture economies of scale in investments and administration than larger schemes. By pooling the scale of several employers, master trusts should be able to provide access to these savings. However, following the introduction of The Pensions Act 2008, and concerns that members might be overcharged the UK Government announced a cap on the fees that could be levied on automatically enrolled members of pensions schemes.

== Governance ==
While master trusts are set up to be separate from their provider, many have questioned the independence of the trustee boards. In a traditional trust based scheme, the trustees are able to replace their service providers, such as administrators or investment managers. However, because of the potential closeness of the provider and their master trust board, the trustees may not have this power in a master trust. In response, the Institute of Chartered Accountants in England and Wales in association with The Pensions Regulator developed a voluntary assurance framework to provide independent assurance reports for the trustees of master trusts. The framework was designed to evidence the key quality features set out in The Pensions Regulator’s code of practice for defined contribution schemes.

== Growth ==
Master trust pension schemes have existed for many years, but came to prominence after the introduction of automatic enrolment. In April 2014 it was estimated that master trusts had accounted for around two thirds of individuals automatically enrolled in the UK.

== See also ==
- Pensions in the United Kingdom
- UK labour law
- Basic state pension
- National Employment Savings Trust
- Smart Pension
- The People's Pension
- NOW:Pensions
