= K. R. Justin Thomas =

Associate professor of chemistry

- Born: 22 July 1968 (age 58); Meignanapuram, Tamil Nadu, India
- Education: American College, Madurai; Indian Institute of Technology Kanpur
- Known for: Studies on organic dyes suitable for OLED and Photovoltaics
- Spouse: J. T. Jeyaseeli Annal
- Awards: CRSI Bronze Medal (2018)
- Scientific career
- Fields: Physical organic chemistry; Heterocyclic chemistry; Organic materials
- Workplaces: Indian Institute of Technology Madras; Indian Institute of Technology Roorkee Academia Sinica; University of Massachusetts at Amherst
- Doctoral advisor: Vadapalli Chandrasekhar
- Other academic advisors: Jiann T'suen Lin; Sankaran Thayumanavan
- Website: faculty.iitr.ac.in/~krjt8fcy/

K. R. Justin Thomas (born 22 July 1968), also known as Koilpitchai Rajapandian Justin Thomas, is an associate professor in the Department of Chemistry at the Indian Institute of Technology Roorkee.

== Early life ==
Justin Thomas was born on 22 July 1968 to Asirvatham Koipitchai Rajapandian and Samuel Manomani. Both his parents were school teachers. His father served as a teacher in the Hindu Middle School at Poochikadu while the mother served in several Panjayat Union Primary Schools in Tiruchendur taluk. He spent his early ages in villages Kudiyiruppuvilai and Mathinanvilai near Tiruchendur. He moved to Megnanapuram at the age of 9, where he continued his schooling. He studied 6th to 12th standard at the Ambrose Higher Secondary School, Megnanapuram. He completed his college studies at Nazareth Margoschis College at Pillaiyanmanai (B.Sc. in chemistry) and The American College at Madurai (M.Sc. in chemistry).

== Early career ==
Justin Thomas earned his Ph.D. in Chemistry under the guidance of Prof. Vadapalli Chandrasekhar at Indian Institute of Technology Kanpur specializing on inorganic heterocycles (cyclophosphazenes). After gaining Ph.D. (1995) he joined, the Sophisticated Analytical Instrumentation Facility at IIT Madras to implement a DST sponsored young scientist scheme (1996–1997). After two years stay at IIT Madras, he moved to Institute of Chemistry, Academia Sinica, Taipei to take a post-doctoral assignment. He served five years (1997–2003) as National Science Council post-doctoral fellow in Taiwan before moving to the Department of Chemistry, University of Massachusetts at Amherst for a year (2003–2004) as research associate. Before assuming the assistant professor position at IIT Roorkee in 2006, he again returned to Taipei and served as senior post-doctoral fellow for two years (2004–2006). Since 2012, he is serving as associate professor of chemistry at the Indian Institute of Technology, Roorkee. In Academia Sinica he worked with Prof. Jiann T'suen Lin while in UMAss at Amherst he collaborated with Prof. Sankaran Thayumanavan. He has acquired expertise in the synthesis of organic materials for application in electronic devices such as organic light-emitting diodes and photovoltaics in Taiwan and on dendrimer synthesis in the US.

== Research activities ==
Justin Thomas research work at IIT Roorkee is focused on the development of organic and organometallic compounds suitable for application in electronic devices such as organic light-emitting diodes, photovoltaics, thin-film transistors and sensors. He is particularly involved in the development of organic fluorophores capable of harvesting triplet excitons in organic light emitting diodes and non-fullerene acceptors for organic solar cells. His molecular design strategies include orthogonal orientation of donor-acceptor charge transfer and local π-π* axes in the molecule to hybridize the charge transfer and local excited states.

== Academic recognition ==
Justin Thomas is a recipient of Chemical Research Society of India (CRSI) Bronze Medal (2018) and fellow of Royal Society of Chemistry, London.
