= Nest (disambiguation) =

A nest is a place animals live or raise offspring.

Nest may also refer to:

- Bird nests in particular

== Places ==
- Nest Lake, a lake in Minnesota, US
- Nest Island, an island in Nunavut, Canada

== People ==
- Nest ferch Cadell, mother of Rhodri the Great, King of Wales
- Nest ferch Rhys, daughter of the last King of South Wales
- Nest, daughter of Gruffudd ap Llywelyn and Ealdgyth, daughter of Earl Ælfgar

== Entertainment ==
- Nest Family Entertainment, an animation studio
- Nest (album), a music album by the Odds
- Nest (band), a Finnish band
- NEST, a fictional organization in the film Transformers: Revenge of the Fallen
- NESTS, a fictional organization from The King of Fighters
- Nest (magazine), a magazine published from 1997 to 2004
- Nest (2022 film), an Icelandic short film directed by Hlynur Pálmason
- Nest (2025 film), a Swiss short film directed by Stefania Burla

== Organizations ==
- Google Nest (formerly Nest Labs), an American manufacturer of smart home products
- Near East School of Theology
- Northland Emergency Services Trust
- Nuclear Emergency Support Team

== Science and technology ==
- Google Nest, a smart home control system (and its derivatives)
- Nest algebra, a mathematical concept
- Nest (histopathology), a microscopic pattern of cells
- Nest (protein structural motif)
- NEST (software), a simulation software for neuronal networks

== Other ==
- National Employment Savings Trust, the UK's default workplace pension scheme
- National Entrance Screening Test, an entrance exam in India
- Nest Learning Thermostat, an electronic, programmable, and self-learning Wi-Fi-enabled thermostat
- Nest (horse), an American thoroughbred horse

== See also ==
- NEST+m, New Explorations into Science, Technology, and Math School
- Nesting (disambiguation)
- Nestling
- Nested
- The Nest (disambiguation)
- NEST (disambiguation)
