= List of Illinois State University people =

This is a list of people related to Illinois State University.

== Presidents ==
21 people have led Illinois State University as president and a number of others have led in an interim or acting capacity. The most recent person, Aondover Tarhule, served in an interim capacity in 2023 before being appointed as the 21st president in 2024.

== Faculty ==
- Herman E. Brockman (1934–2025) – Professor of biological science
- Roque Cordero (1917–2008) – Professor of music
- John Dossey (1944–2024) – Professor of mathematics
- Nerida Ellerton – Professor of mathematics education
- Timothy D. Lash – Professor of chemistry
- Lida Brown McMurry (1853–1942)
- Rati Ram (1934–2024) – Professor of economics
- Arlan Richardson – Professor of biochemistry
- Jean Scharfenberg (1922-1998) – Professor of theatre
