= SBF =

SBF may refer to:

== People ==
- Sam Bankman-Fried (born 1992), US cryptocurrency businessman, former billionaire and convicted fraudster

== Organizations ==
=== Academic ===
- Brazilian Physical Society (Sociedade Brasileira de Física)
- Faculty of Political Science, Ankara University (Ankara Üniversitesi Siyasal Bilgiler Fakültesi), Turkey
- Société botanique de France, French botanical society
- Studium Biblicum Franciscanum, Franciscan Bible researchers based in Jerusalem

=== Athletic ===
- Seychelles Basketball Federation, organiser of the Seychelles Basketball League
- Stix, Baer and Fuller F.C., a soccer team

=== Other organizations ===
- Saint Barbara Foundation, a mine clearance organization in Germany
- SBF Visa Group, Italian amusement ride manufacturer
- Scottish Building Federation
- Singapore Business Federation
- Société des Bourses Françaises, predecessor to Euronext Paris
- Springboard Foundation, Philippine charity
- Stix Baer & Fuller, former store chain, St. Louis, Missouri, US

== Science and technology ==
- Short backfire antenna
- Simulated body fluid
- Surface brightness fluctuation, in astrophysics

== Transportation ==
- Sardeh Band Airport, Afghanistan (IATA airport code)
- Small Block Ford, engine series
- St Budeaux Ferry Road railway station, Devon, England (National Rail station code)
- Fairchild SBF, WWII dive bomber
- Grumman XSBF, 1930s prototype dive-bomber

== Other uses ==
- SBF 120, French stock market index
- Shabo language of Ethiopia
