= Roger Guilard =

French chemist

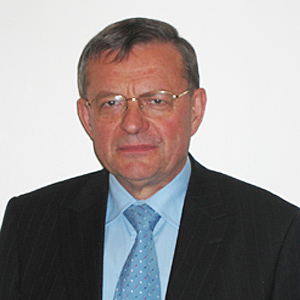
- Born: 1940 (age 85–86); Gergy, France
- Education: University of Burgundy
- Scientific career
- Fields: Heterocyclic Chemistry; Organometallic Chemistry; Coordination Chemistry; Bioinspired Materials

Roger Guilard is a French chemist. He is a professor of chemistry at the University of Burgundy in Dijon, France where he is a member of the Institute of Molecular Chemistry of the University of Burgundy.

== Career ==
Guilard received the "Agrégation de Sciences Physiques" Degree in 1966 and a PhD in 1971 from the University of Burgundy. He was a Postdoctoral Fellow at the University of Basel, Switzerland and at the University of Darmstadt, Germany from 1972 to 1973, and subsequently has been at the University of Burgundy from 1973 to present. At the University of Burgundy he has been the director of the Laboratory of Synthesis and Organometallic Electrosynthesis and the Molecular Engineering Laboratory for Separation and Applications of Gases.

Guilard was Scientific Director of the Department of Chemistry at the French Ministry of Education, Technology and Research, and then Managing Director for the partnership of local authorities in the Partnership Branch of the Centre National de la Recherche Scientifique, CNRS.

Guilard founded two companies, Chematech and PorphyChem which produce tetraazamacrocycles, porphyrins, phthalocyanines and related compounds, respectively, for use in research, industrial applications and health care. He is also a member of the advisory board of LARS - Ligament Augmentation and Reconstruction System which provides synthetic ligaments for soft tissue repair.

Guilard holds 23 patents, including a technique for decontamination of radioactive elements from wastewater, a process for removing lead from drinking water and a carbon monoxide sensor. He has published more than 475 articles in peer-reviewed journals and has co-edited several influential book series including The Porphyrin Handbook, the Handbook of Porphyrin Science, the World Scientific Series on Chemistry, Energy and the Environment, and the World Scientific Series: From Biomaterials Towards Medical Devices. He was an associate editor for the journal Dalton Transactions and has served on the editorial boards for Dalton Transactions, the Journal of Porphyrins and Phthalocyanines and the New Journal of Chemistry.

== Selected awards/honors ==
- 2013 - "Grand Prix - Emile Jungfleish" Grand prize from the French Academy of Sciences,
- 2010 - Robert Burns Woodward Career Award in Porphyrin Chemistry, 6th International Conference on Porphyrins and Phthalocyanines (ICPP)
- 2001 - "Grand Prix - Gaz de France (Applications)" Grand prize from the French Academy of Sciences
- 2001 - Honoris Causa Doctorate from the University of Sherbrooke (Canada)
- 1997 - "Prix - Paul Langevin" Prize from the French Academy of Sciences
- 1999 - Association of American Publishers Award for Excellence in Professional/Scholarly Publishing
- 1991 - "Prix - Marguerite de la Charlonie" Prize from the French Academy of Sciences
- 1978 - "Prix - Société chimique de France" Prize from the French Chemical Society (SCF), Coordination Chemistry Division

== Memberships/fellowships/positions ==
- 2000–present - Vice President of the Society of Porphyrins and Phthalocyanines (SPP)
- 1996-2018 - Editorial board of Journal of Porphyrins and Phthalocyanines (JPP)
- 2015 - Fellow of the Academia Europaea
- 2014 - Distinguished Member of the French Chemical Society
- 2008 - Japan Society for the Promotion of Science (JSPS) fellow
- 1997-2002 - Member, Editorial Board of the New Journal of Chemistry
- 1996-2002 - Associate Editor and member, Editorial Board of the Journal of the Royal Chemical Society, Dalton Transactions
- 2001 - Knight of the National Order of Merit, France
- 1999 - Commander, Order of Academic Palms
