= Pensions in the Republic of Ireland =

Compared to other liberal democracies, Ireland's pension policies have average coverage, which includes 78 percent of the workforce as of 2014, and it offers different types of pensions for employees to choose from. The Irish pension system is designed as a pay-as-you-go program and is based on both public and private pension programs.

The Pensions Authority regulates occupational pension schemes, trust RACs, Personal Retirement Savings Accounts (PRSAs), employers and Registered Administrators (RAs). It is a statutory body set up under the Pensions Act, 1990. It is also a member of the European Systemic Risk Board (ESRB).

== Description ==
The OECD's Reviews of Pension Systems: Ireland, explains the structures of both the public and private pension systems. "The public pension system has two sets of flat-rate benefits: 1) a basic flat-rate benefit to all retirees that meet the contribution conditions, the State pension (contributory) or SPC and the State pension (transition) or SPT; and 2) a means-tested benefit to those that have not contributed or have not contributed enough, the State pension (non-contributory) or SPNC.

The SPC is payable from age 66, with the maximum personal rate of EUR 248.30 a week for a single person (paid for 52 weeks per year), corresponding to 33.1 percent of average earnings. The SPNC is currently payable from age 66, with a maximum rate of EUR 237 per week for a single person, i.e. 31.5 percent of average earnings. All recipients of pension benefits are entitled to the Household Benefits Package comprising an electricity/gas and telephone allowance as well as a free television license, if they are over the age of 70, while those between the age of 65–69 are means-tested. The contribution conditions for the SPC are that recipients have started paying social insurance before reaching age 56 and they also have paid at least 520 full-rate insurance contributions if reaching 66 after April 6, 2012.

The contribution base rate is currently 14.75 percent, with 10.75 percent paid by employers and 4 percent by employees (except for employees who earn less than EUR 352 per week for whom only employer contributions are payable). The SPNC is financed through general taxation and is paid according to need. As for private pension programs, there three main types; 1) occupational pension schemes that are set up by employers; 2) Personal Retirement Savings Account (PRSAs) that are personal pension saving plans and contributions are made by individuals; and 3) Retirement Annuity Contracts (RACs) that are also a personal pension saving plan but are excluded from those who are already enrolled in a company pension plan".

When looking at the coverage of public and private pension programs, SPC and SPNC cover 46 percent of the workforce, and SPT and occupational or private pension covers 37 percent of the workforce, which is a result from striking differences in industries and occupations. Raab and Gannon point out how "occupational pensions are generally not mandatory, except in the public sector, and that 55 percent of professionals are able to expect a firm's pension but the corresponding share for sales people is 23 percent". The Irish pension policies are designed to offer incentives for labor participation but are still reforming to the changes in the economy.

== State pension system ==
The Irish state pension is designed to give a basic retirement income. There are two forms of State Pensions in Ireland: The Contributory State Pension and The Non-Contributory State pension.

=== Contributory State Pension ===
The Contributory State Pension is a social insurance program that constructs pensions from a contribution-based payment system (a pay as you go system). Because workers contribute to the pension themselves it is not a means tested system. It is allotted to those over the age of 66 who have fulfilled the following qualifications:

- Began paying social contributions by the age of 56 (this age is raised for those born before 1922).
- Have paid at least 520 full rate contributions before reaching the qualifying pension age.
- Met the average number of contributions per year. This average can be achieved in two different ways. Method one, called the normal average, is achieved by meeting a yearly average of ten adequate contributions from 1953 or the year one enters insurance, whichever is later, to the qualifying pension age. Method two, called the alternative average, is achieved by having an average of 48 contributions from 1980 to the pension qualifying age. These contributions can be Class A, E, F, G, H, N, or S social contributions.

The Contributory State Pension can be paired with other income and is taxable, but it is unlikely to be taxed if it's a pensioners sole income. The pension can max out at a yearly value of €12,911.60. A pensions maximum value is not determined by the pensioners earnings level, but their social insurance contribution history. Having an average of 10 adequate contributions a year will garner the minimum pension, while an average of 48 and above will garner you the maximum pension.

=== Non-Contributory State Pension ===
The Non-Contributory State Pension is for those over the age of 66 who are unable to qualify for a Contributory State Pension. To qualify for the Non-Contributory State Pension one must be a habitual resident of Ireland and pass means test. The means test evaluates a citizens cash income, capital (excluding their home), and income derived from personally used property.

== Recent changes to the state pension system ==
The Social Welfare and Pensions Act of 2011 made changes to the qualifications needed for both the Contributory and Non-Contributory State Pensions. The act rose the qualifying age from 66 in a stepwise manner. Those born after 1 January 1955, but before 1 January 1961 are now are eligible to collect their state pension at 67. All those born after 1 January 1961 will be eligible to collect their pensions at 68. Raising the pension eligibility age of pensions is a contentious issue, but a slim majority of 53% acknowledge the fiscal need to raise the eligibility age.

More changes to the qualifications for the Contributory State Pension are expected to be rolled out in 2022. These changes are being implemented to shift more future pensioners over to Contributory State Pensions in an attempt to reduce the fiscal impact of the pension system. Currently 19% of pensioners are on Non-Contributory State Pensions and spending on these pensions makes up 16% of the budget. These changes will not affect those currently on Non Contributory Pensions.

== Auto-enrolment (My Future Fund) ==
In July 2024, automatic enrolment legislation was enacted by way of the Automatic Enrolment Retirement Savings System Bill 2024 which was passed through the Dáil by minister Heather Humphreys. The scheme is officially named 'My Future Fund'.

Tata Consultancy Services was selected as the preferred bidder to run the system.

The system commences on 1 January 2026 with employees between the age of 23 - 60, earning over €20,000 and not in a pension scheme will be automatically enrolled. Workers can opt out between months 6-8 but will be automatically re-enrolled every 2 years if they meet the eligibility criteria.

== Taxation of pensions ==
Generally, income derived from pensions is subject to taxation. In addition to the contribution age limits, Irish tax legislation places a limit on the maximum amount of earnings that can be taken into account when calculating tax credits. This limit is €115,000 per annum under s790A (2) TCA 1997.

=== Social security pensions ===
Social security pensions paid by the Social Security Department are subject to income tax. They are not subject to USC or PRSI taxation.

Where there is income from employment or an occupational pension, taxation under the pay as you earn (PAYE) system applies. As a PAYE taxpayer, tax credits and the range of tax rates are reduced to take account of tax payable on social security pensions. This means that the amount of tax payable on a Social Security pension is deducted from other income.

== See also ==
- Pan-European Pension
- Auto-enrolment in the Republic of Ireland
- Social policy
