= Timothy Lash =

Timothy Lash may refer to:

- Timothy D. Lash (born 1963), English chemist
- Timothy L. Lash, American epidemiologist
- Tim Lash, guitarist for Hum (band)
