= Atsuhiro Osuka =

Japanese chemist (born 1954)

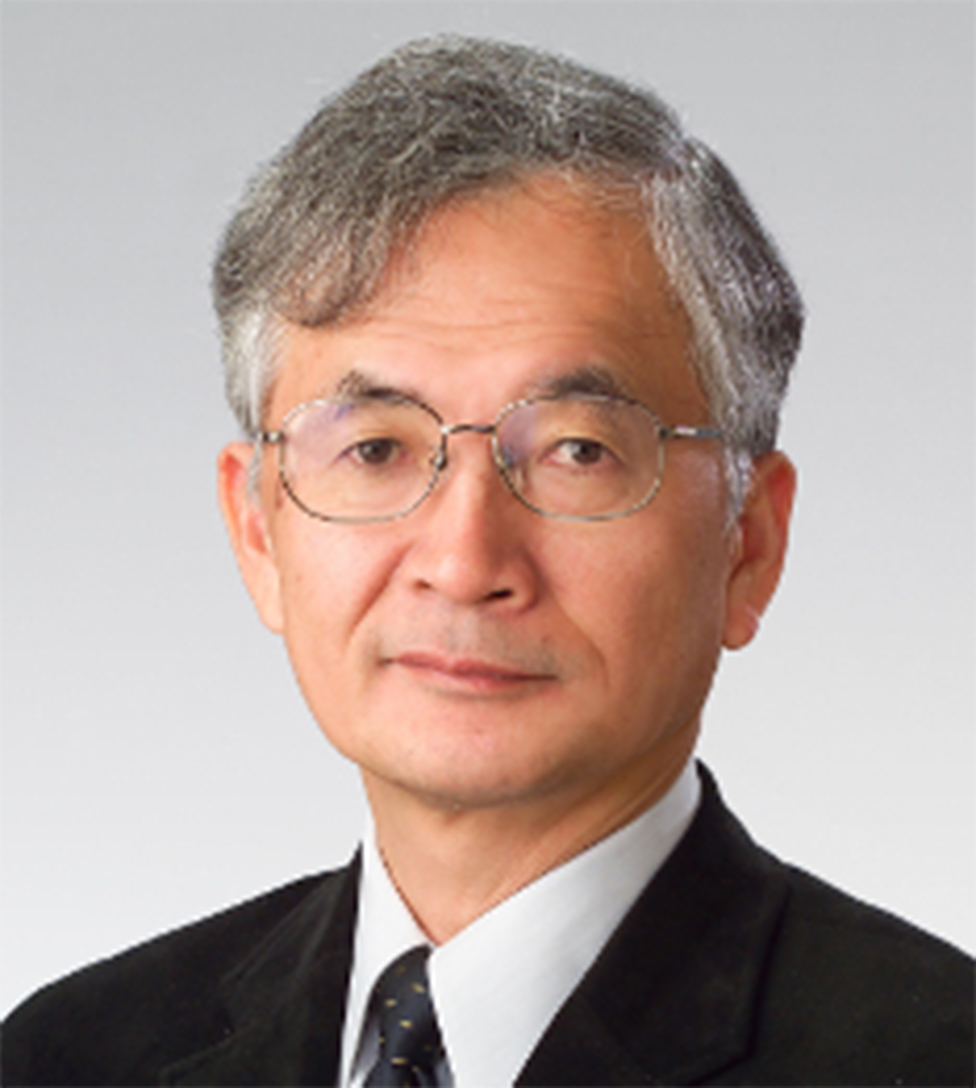
- Atsuhiro Osuka
- Born: 16 October 1954; Gamagōri, Aichi Prefecture, Japan
- Education: Kyoto University
- Known for: Porphyrin Chemistry; Möbius aromatic expanded porphyrins; π-electron systems
- Awards: CSJ award 2010
- Scientific career
- Thesis: (1982)
- Doctoral advisor: K. Maruyama

Atsuhiro Osuka (大須賀篤弘, Osuka Atsuhiro; born 16 October 1954) is a research professor of organic chemistry in the Department of Chemistry, Graduate School of Science, Kyoto University (Japan). He is recognized in the fields of porphyrinoid chemistry for his works in extended π-electron systems and its tunable aromatic behaviors.

Osuka has published research concerning extremely long porphyrin arrays, extensively π-conjugated porphyrin tapes, large porphyrin wheels, an antiaromatic porphyrin sheet, porphyrin belts, and porphyrin barrels. He has explored the properties of Meso-aryl expanded porphyrins for its transannular reactions and splitting reactions. He has used meso-aryl expanded porphyrins as a scaffold to study twisted Möbius aromatic and antiaromatic systems.

Osuka introduced a new class of real congeners of contracted porphyrins, which he named subporphyrins.

== Early life ==
Osuka was born on 16 October 1954 in Gamagōri, Aichi Prefecture, Japan.

== Education ==
In 1977, Osuka completed his B.S., Faculty of Science from Kyoto University. In 1982, he received his PhD from the Department of Chemistry, Kyoto University.

== Academic career ==
From 1979 to 1984, Osuka served at Ehime University as an assistant professor. He returned to Kyoto University, and served as an assistant professor from 1984 to 1987, and as an associate professor from 1987 to 1996. In 1996, he was named as a professor at Kyoto University, where he worked until his retirement in 2020.

Osuka served as a visiting professor at the University of Burgundy in 2006 and 2009, and also at the Chinese University of Hong Kong in 2006.

From 2001 to 2007, Osuka was the Project Leader of "Creation of Bio-devices and Bio-systems with Chemical and Biological Molecules for Medical Use" at the Japan Science and Technology Agency.

On the occasion of his 65th birthday and his retirement, in 2020, from Kyoto University, a special issue of the Journal of Porphyrins and Phthalocyanines was dedicated to honouring Osuka and his achievements. As a mark of respect for his work in this field, T. K. Chandrashekar and J. Sessler were among the fifty-five scholar-contributors who submitted their research papers to be published in his honour.

Osuka's influence in the field of porphyrin chemistry, due to his scientific discoveries, were mentioned in the foreword to the issue. Of note were the preparation of various extended porphyrins as Huckel-Möbius (anti) aromaticity switching models, structural rearrangements and "creation of a vast array" of new π conjugated structures of "tremendous aesthetic appeal".

== Awards and recognition ==
- 1988 – Chemical Society of Japan Young Chemists award
- 1999 – The Japanese Photochemistry Association Award at 13th International Symposium on Novel Aromatic Compounds (ISNA-13; Luxembourg)
- 2009 – Nozoe Memorial Lectureship Award (International Symposium on the Chemistry of Nonbenzenoid Aromatic Compounds)
- 2010 – Chemical Society of Japan Award
- 2016 – Robert Burns Woodward Career Award in Porphyrin Chemistry Lifetime Achievement Award
- 2020 – Journal of Porphyrins and Phthalocyanines Special issue of the journal, dedicated to Osuka.

== Publications ==
Number of citations in Google Scholar, August 2020	Year of publication	Work
434	1997	Osuka, Atsuhiro; Shimidzu, Hitoshi (3 February 1997). "meso, meso-Linked Porphyrin Arrays". Angewandte Chemie International Edition in English. 36 (12): 135–137. doi:10.1002/anie.199701351.
384	2000	Aratani, Naoki; Osuka, Atsuhiro; Kim, Yong Hee; Jeong, Dae Hong; Kim, Dongho (2000). "Extremely Long, Discrete meso – meso-Coupled Porphyrin Arrays". Angewandte Chemie International Edition. 39 (8): 1458–1462. doi:10.1002/(SICI)1521-3773(20000417)39:8<1458::AID-ANIE1458>3.0.CO;2-E. PMID 10777641.
855	2001	Tsuda, A.; Osuka, Atsuhiro (6 July 2001). "Fully Conjugated Porphyrin Tapes with Electronic Absorption Bands That Reach into Infrared". Science. 293 (5527): 79–82. doi:10.1126/science.1059552. PMID 11441176. S2CID 12054440.
438	2004	Kim, Dongho; Osuka, Atsuhiro (October 2004). "Directly Linked Porphyrin Arrays with Tunable Excitonic Interactions". Accounts of Chemical Research. 37 (10): 735–745. doi:10.1021/ar030242e. PMID 15491120.
