= Smart Pension =

British pensions and retirement technology business

- Website type: Limited liability company
- Founded: 2014
- Headquarters: London, UK
- Founders: Andrew Evans, William Wynne
- Industry: Finance
- Products: Pension scheme

Smart Pension is a pensions and retirement technology business, delivering pensions technology platforms in partnership with other financial institutions, and running a defined contribution master trust pension scheme setup for employers to enrol employees in a workplace pension scheme.

== Operations ==
Smart Pension's headquarters are in Marylebone, London. They also operate in other regions including the Middle East with Zurich, and in Ireland with New Ireland Assurance, as well as strategic partnerships with Australia's Link Group, and France's Natixis IM

In 2016, Smart Pension was added to the UK government's Pensions Regulator’s list of Group Personal Pensions open to any employer, having met the master trust assurance framework and other required criteria.

== Investment and recognition ==
In July 2016, L&G Investment Management announced that it was investing more than £3 million in Smart Pension. In June 2017, the company won Overall Winner on the DL100 List and Fintech Innovation of the Year at the Digital Leaders Awards 2017. JP Morgan announced an investment in the business in February 2019, taking a 'minority stake'. In November 2019, it was announced Link Group, an Australian provider of technology-enabled administration solutions, with over 7,000 employees working across 18 jurisdictions, had invested an undisclosed amount as part of a strategic partnership. Natixis IM, one of the world's largest asset management firms, announced a strategic investment in Smart in May 2020. In June 2021, it was announced that Chrysalis Investments was taking a £75 million stake in Smart as part of a £165 million Series D funding round.

== Legal background ==
The Pensions Act 2008 is an act of the Parliament of the United Kingdom. The principal change brought about by the act is the requirement for all employees to have to opt out of a workplace pension scheme, rather than opt in. This change in law moves a significant portion of responsibility onto employers in the UK to ensure that they are providing a workplace pension scheme for all eligible employees.

Employers were required to initiate automatic enrolment into their workplace according to set staging dates based on the number of employees in the company. These dates started in 2012 and will run until February 2018, and there are penalties for companies that do not comply.

== ASA Rulings ==
In 2016, the Advertising Standards Authority upheld a complaint that a Smart Pension direct mail advertisement had ‘misleadingly suggested it was an official communication’. Those complaining challenged whether or not it was clear that the letter was an advert. The ASA agreed with the complainant and concluded that the advert "was not obviously identifiable as an ad, that it misleadingly suggested it was an official communication". The ASA went on to state that the advert suggested companies needed to contact Smart Pension in order to comply with auto enrolment legislation, despite this not being the case, as Smart Pension offer a commercial service.

Another complaint was made on 25 January 2017 (also upheld) showing that Smart Pension repeated a similar act. The detail states that 'The ASA welcomed Smart Pension's willingness to make changes to the ad.'. This was tested via a similar complaint in November 2017. The ASA investigated this and, in October 2018 upheld one of three points. In looking again at this, the ASA in February 2019 stated 'This ruling replaces that published on 17 October 2018. the decision on point 3 has been reversed, making the complaint not upheld', the ASA concluding that Smart Pension was not in breach on any of the three points in the complaint.

== See also ==
- Automatic Enrolment
- Pensions Act 2008
- United Kingdom labour law
- The Pensions Regulator
- Arena Flowers
- Legal & General Group
