= Handbook of Porphyrin Science =

Reference work edited by Karl Kadish, Kevin Smith and Roger Guilard

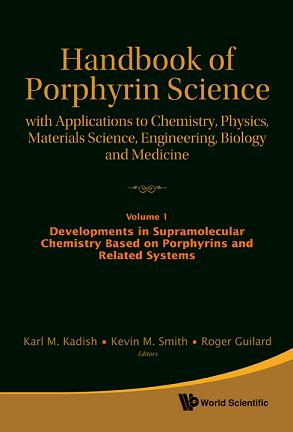
- Handbook of Porphyrin Science
- Author: Karl M Kadish, Kevin Smith, Roger Guilard
- Language: English
- Genre: Chemistry
- Publisher: World Scientific
- Publication date: 2010
- Media type: Print (Hardcover)
- Pages: 2000pp
- ISBN: 978-981-4280-16-7
- OCLC: 326626716
- Followed by: *

Published by World Scientific, the Handbook of Porphyrin Science: With Applications to Chemistry, Physics, Materials Science, Engineering, Biology and Medicine is a multi-volume reference set edited by scientists Karl Kadish, Kevin Smith and Roger Guilard. The first ten volumes were published in 2010 and the 46th volume was published in 2022.

Topics covered include:

- Developments in Supramolecular Chemistry Based on Porphyrins and Related Systems
- Involvement of Porphyrins and Related Systems in Catalysis
- Phototherapy, Radioimmunotherapy and Imaging
- Advances in Synthesis and Coordination Chemistry of Porphyrins, Phthalocyanines and Related Systems
- Heme Proteins

The current work stems from World Scientific's Journal of Porphyrins and Phthalocyanines (JPP) and from the research interests of the three editors and hundreds of authors who have presented the results of their research in this society-run journal since its founding in 1997.
