= Nesting =

Nesting may refer to:

== Science and technology ==
- Fermi surface nesting, a concept in quantum mechanics

=== Parenting behavior ===
- Building or having a nest
  - Nesting instinct, an instinct in pregnant animals to prepare a home for offspring

=== Things within other things of the same kind ===
- Nesting (computing), a concept of information organized recursively
- Nesting (process), a process of efficiently manufacturing parts from flat raw material
- Nesting algorithm for optimal packing
- Nested sampling algorithm, a method in Bayesian statistics
- Nested radical, a radical (i.e. mathematical notation for an nth root) with other radicals inside it
- Nested intervals, in mathematics, intervals within intervals
- Nested variation or nested data, described at restricted randomization
  - Nested case-control study, a case when this occurs

== Other uses ==
- Nesting (child custody), a child custody arrangement in which the children stay in the home
- Nesting (voting districts), the process of combining or splitting of voting districts
- Nesting, Shetland, in Scotland
- The Nesting, a 1981 American slasher film directed by Armand Weston
- Nesting (2012 film), an American romantic comedy film directed by John Chuldenko
- Nesting (2025 film), a Canadian thriller film directed by Chloé Cinq-Mars

== See also ==
- All articles beginning with Nesting
- Nest (disambiguation)
- Matryoshka doll, a Russian nested doll
