= The Nest =

The Nest may refer to:

== Arts and entertainment ==
=== Films ===
- The Nest (1927 film), an American silent drama film
- The Nest (1980 film), a Spanish drama film
- The Nest (1988 film), an American science-fiction horror film
- The Nest (2002 film), French action thriller film
- The Nest, a 2014 short film directed by David Cronenberg
- The Nest (2018 film), a Canadian psychological thriller
- The Nest (2019 film), an Italian horror film
- The Nest (2020 film), a period drama written and directed by Sean Durkin
- The Nest (2021 film), an American horror film directed by James Suttles
- The Nest (2026 film), a Spanish psychological thriller film
- Sisters (2015 film), originally titled The Nest

=== Literature ===
- The Nest (novel), by Cynthia D'Aprix Sweeney, 2016

=== Music ===
- The Nest (album), by Ketil Bjørnstad, 2003
- The Nest, a subscription service of record label Owsla

=== Television ===
- The Nest (Australian TV series), a 2008 family life documentary
- The Nest (British TV series), a 2020 drama
- "The Nest" (The Amazing World of Gumball), a television episode
- The Nest (TV network), an American digital broadcast network

== Other uses ==
- The Nest (aviary), in Ixtapaluca, Mexico
- The Nest (political party), in Togo
- The Nest (football ground), the 1908–1935 home ground of Norwich City F.C. in England
- The Nest, common name of Croydon Common Athletic Ground in Selhurst, London, England
- The Nest Club, a 1923–1932 cabaret in Harlem, New York, U.S.

== See also ==
- Nest (disambiguation)
