= Auto-enrolment in the Republic of Ireland =

Pension system in Ireland

Auto-enrolment in the Republic of Ireland, formally My Future Fund, is a government scheme to provide private pensions for employed persons within the state to supplement the state pensions system and provide an easier and cheaper way of contributing outside of other private pension products such as a Personal Retirement Savings Account and occupational pension schemes.

This occurs by way of a non tax-deductible contribution of a percentage of an employee's income, along with an equal monetary contribution from the employer and a smaller prescribed percentage contribution from the government.

One of the core aims of the scheme is to provide pensions for those outside of the current net, i.e. lower earners without access to or knowledge of occupational pension schemes.

== Overview ==
The scheme officially commenced in July 2024, when automatic enrolment legislation was enacted by way of the Automatic Enrolment Retirement Savings System Bill 2024 which was passed through the Dáil by minister Heather Humphreys. ('Auto-enrolment' is short for automatic enrolment.)

The scheme will be overseen by the National Automatic Enrolment Retirement Savings Authority (NAERSA) and Tata Consultancy Services was selected as the preferred bidder to run the system.

The system commences on 1 January 2026 with employees between the age of 23 - 60, earning over €20,000 and not in a pension scheme (paying into a pension via payroll) will be automatically enrolled. Workers can opt out between months 6-8 and can get a refund of their contributions but will be automatically re-enrolled every 2 years if they meet the eligibility criteria.

Employees who start paying into another private pension scheme will automatically see their contributions cease to the My Future Fund scheme.

The employer's and government's contribution are capped based on an annual gross salary of €80,000 although employees can still contribute to the scheme over this level of income.

The scheme has been criticised as contributions to the scheme are not tax deductible, unlike contributions to a PRSA or occupational pension scheme with the scheme seen as initially penalising those who are less knowledgeable, younger or on a lower income.

=== Contributions ===
The table below contains details of the mandatory contributions made relating to the percentage of the employee's gross salary (before any tax is deducted by the Revenue Commissioners) over the course of the scheme.

Year	Year (Band)	Employee contribution	Employer contribution	Government contribution
2026	Year 1-3	1.5%	1.5%	0.5%
2027	Year 1-3	1.5%	1.5%	0.5%
2028	Year 1-3	1.5%	1.5%	0.5%
2029	Year 4-6	3%	3%	1%
2030	Year 4-6	3%	3%	1%
2031	Year 4-6	3%	3%	1%
2031	Year 7-9	4.5%	4.5%	1.5%
2032	Year 7-9	4.5%	4.5%	1.5%
2033	Year 7-9	4.5%	4.5%	1.5%
2034	Year 10+	6%	6%	2%

For example, for someone earning €50,000 in 2026, €750 will be contributed by them in the first year (2026), €750 will be contributed by their employer and €250 will be contributed by the Irish government. In total this will result in an annual pension contribution of €1,750.

The table below sets out illustrative examples of contributions for those earning €20,000 and €50,000 in 2026.

Annual Salary	Year (Band)	Employee contribution	Employer contribution	Government contribution	Total contributions
€20,000	Year 1-3	€300	€300	€100	€700
€50,000	Year 1-3	€750	€750	€250	€1,750

=== Employee portal ===
An employee portal has been created where users will be able to see their contributions (savings), administration fees deducted from their account, investment returns and choose their desired high-level investment options, be they high, medium or low risk.

Users will be able to login by using their MyGovID; however as of 12 December 2025, the public have not been given access to the employee portal.

== See also ==
- Personal Retirement Savings Account
- Pensions in the Republic of Ireland
- Pensions in the United Kingdom
- National Employment Savings Trust - the UK specific auto-enrolment scheme
