= Timothy D. Lash =

English-born chemist

- Born: 13 October 1953; Salisbury, England
- Education: University of Exeter; University of Wales; Cardiff University
- Alma mater: University of Wales; Cardiff University
- Known for: Synthesis of Porphyrin, Carbaporphyrins
- Scientific career
- Institutions: Illinois State University
- Thesis: (1979)
- Doctoral advisor: A. H. Jackson

Timothy D. Lash (born 13 October 1953) is an English-born chemist. He moved to the United States and began teaching at Illinois State University in 1984. Lash is known for his contributions to synthetic porphyrin chemistry.

== Career ==
Timothy D. Lash was born on 13 October 1953, in Salisbury, England. He completed B.Sc. (Hon.) degree in chemistry from the University of Exeter in 1975 and his MS in organic chemistry from University of Wales, College of Cardiff. In 1979 he received his Ph.D. in organic chemistry from same university under the guidance of A. H. Jackson.

Lash joined the Department of Chemistry at Illinois State University in 1984 and assumed the rank of professor in 1993. In 2000, he was designated as a distinguished professor, the highest honor awarded by the university. In 2004, Lash was selected as “Chemist of the Year” for the Illinois Heartland section of the American Chemical Society.

== Publications ==
- T. D. Lash, “Carbaporphyrins and Related Systems. Synthesis, Characterization, Reactivity and Insights into the Nature of Porphyrinoid Aromaticity” in Handbook of Porphyrin Science – With Applications to Chemistry, Physics, Material Science, Engineering, Biology and Medicine, Ed. K. M. Kadish, K. M. Smith and R. Guilard, World Scientific Publishing, Singapore, 2012, Volume 16, Chapter 74, pp 1–329.
- T. D. Lash, “Synthesis of Novel Porphyrin Chromophores” in The Porphyrin Handbook, Ed. K. M. Kadish, K. M. Smith and R. Guilard, Academic Press: San Diego, CA, 2000, Volume 2: Heteroporphyrins, Expanded Porphyrins and Related Macrocycles, Chapter 10, pp 125–199.
- T. D. Lash, “Synthesis of porphyrins with exocyclic rings from cycloalkenopyrroles” in Advances in Nitrogen Heterocycles, Volume 1, Ed. C. J. Moody, JAI Press Inc., 1995, pp 19–69.
- T. D. Lash, “Heteroporphyrins and Carbaporphyrins” in Porphyrins for the 21st Century, Volume 1 – Fundamentals, Ed. P. Brothers and M. Senge, Wiley, 2016, in press.
