= Personal Retirement Savings Account =

Type of pension savings account in the Republic of Ireland

A Personal Retirement Savings Account (PRSA) is a type of savings account introduced to the Irish market in 2003. In an attempt to increase pension coverage, the Pensions Board introduced a retirement savings account, that would entice the lower paid and self-employed to start making some pension provision. The intention was for PRSAs to supplement any State Retirement Benefits that would be payable in years to come.

The product bears some similarities to an Individual Savings Account in the United Kingdom and similar products in other countries.

== History ==
PRSAs were introduced in 2002 to try to increase pension coverage and ensure adequate and flexible availability of cheap and portable pension products, mainly targeting the self-employed.

In 2022, the Finance Act introduced a provision which resulted in the age limit for employer related contributions for an employee's pension no longer being counted towards the employee's age related limit. The act also excluded employer contributions to an employee's PRSA from qualifying as a benefit-in-kind for tax purposes.

There are two types of PRSAs, Standard and Non-Standard.

=== Standard PRSA ===
The Standard PRSA has a legal cap on charges of 5% on the contributions paid and 1% per year of the funds under management and investments are only allowed in pooled funds including unit trusts. There can be no other charge applied to the setting up of a PRSA, unless it forms part of an overall financial review. In this case, a fee may be charged for the advice given.

=== Non-standard PRSA ===
The Non-standard PRSA can have charges higher than those stated for a Standard PRSA.

A consumer can purchase a PRSA with or without advice. If the consumer does not need advice on the product or in selecting investment funds, they can buy a PRSA on an 'Execution Only' basis. The reward for the consumer in electing for this method of purchase is that they can buy the product without the 5% contribution charge.

The PRSA product can also be used to supplement existing pension funding by making additional voluntary contributions to any other pension scheme available through an employer.

The PRSA contributor can select a single fund or combination of funds from those provided by each of the PRSA providers. They can also elect to choose a 'Default Investment Strategy' which is designed to fulfil the reasonable expectations of a typical investor.

The minimum contribution to a PRSA is €10 per month. This can be paid by salary deduction or through the contributors own bank account. If the contribution is deducted from salary, then any Tax and PRSI (Pay Related Social Insurance) Reliefs are applied at source so that the payments are made on a nett basis.

If payments are made from the contributors bank account, then any Tax or PRSI Reliefs that may be due would have to be applied for 'manually' through Revenue. Tax Relief and PRSI Relief are dealt with by two separate section of Revenue.

=== Fund threshold ===
In 2005, a cap on pension savings subject to tax relief was set at €5m, however this was cut to €2.3m in 2010 and €2m in 2014 which it remained until changes were made in the 2025 budget which saw the limit increase by €200,000 annually from 2026 to 2029 up to a maximum of €2.8m.

Anything above the limit is taxed at a rate of 40%.

=== Retirement ===
At retirement Most PRSA contributors elect to take 25% of their fund tax-free up to a limit of €200,000. If they do this they can either buy an annuity with the balance, invest in an ARF (Approved Retirement Fund) or a combination of both. Contributions can be made to a PRSA up to age 75, but must then be transferred to an annuity or ARF.

In the event of death before normal retirement, the full value of the PRSA fund, without liability to income tax, is paid to the PRSA holders estate. Inheritance Tax may apply to the fund. The PRSA fund assets can be used to provide a pension for a spouse.

=== Employers' obligations ===
Employers have to offer their employees the facility to put in place at least one Standard PRSA in situations where:

- there is no pension scheme currently in place
- some employees are excluded from the existing pension scheme
- the waiting period for membership of the existing scheme is more than 6 months
- The current pension scheme rules do not allow employees to make AVCs

Employers are not compulsorily obliged to make contributions to an employee's PRSA.

=== Property purchase through a PRSA ===
Only non-standard PRSAs can be used to buy property although the rules around lending against the property are restrictive. Loans are usually limited to a maximum of 50% Loan-to-value. The advantages include that the rental income is earned tax free and there is no capital gains tax paid on any gain on the sale of the property.

== Taxation ==
There are certain Revenue limits that apply to the maximum contribution that can be made in any one tax year. These are dependent on the age of the contributor and their earnings (defined as net relevant earnings) as set out in the table below.

The maximum annual income limit for calculating tax relief is €115,000 however any excess above the limit may be available for relief in future years subject to the relevant limits not being surpassed.

Age attained during calendar year	Limit of Tax Relief (% of Net Relevant Earnings)
Less than 30	15%
30 - 39	20%
40 - 49	25%
50 - 54	30%
55 - 59	35%
60 and over	40%

The Tax Relief available on contributions are granted at the contributor's highest marginal rate of tax. For example, if an employee's highest rate of income tax is 40% and they also pay PRSI of 6%, the nett cost on a contribution of €100 would be €54.

Any investment growth accumulates free of tax which is referred to as "gross roll-up".

Contributors are entitled to 25% of their accumulated fund at retirement, tax-free. The balance of the fund is subject to the income tax rates prevalent at the date of retirement.

== See also ==
- Pensions in the Republic of Ireland
- Auto-enrolment in the Republic of Ireland
- Individual Savings Account (ISA) (United Kingdom)
