= Bedangadas Mohanty =

Indian physicist

- Born: 8 April 1973 (age 53); Cuttack, Odisha, India
- Education: Utkal University Bhubaneswar; Institute of Physics, Bhubaneswar
- Known for: Experimental High Energy Physics
- Awards: Infosys Prize in Physical Sciences, 2021; S.S. Bhatnagar Award 2015; SwarnaJayanti Fellowship, 2010-11; INSA Young Scientist Medal, 2003
- Scientific career
- Fields: Physics
- Workplaces: National Institute of Science Education and Research, Jatani

Bedangadas Mohanty is an Indian physicist specialising in experimental high energy physics, and is affiliated to National Institute of Science Education and Research, Bhubaneswar. He has been awarded the Infosys Prize in Physical Sciences for 2021 that was announced on 2 December 2021. He was awarded the Shanti Swarup Bhatnagar Prize for Science and Technology in 2015, the highest science award in India, in the physical sciences category. He has been elected as the fellow of the Indian National Science Academy, New Delhi, Indian Academy of Sciences, Bangalore and National Academy of Sciences, India. In 2020, he was elected as a fellow of American Physical Society.

== Career ==
Mohanty completed his BSc (physics honors) from Ranvenshaw College, Cuttack, and MSc (physics) from Utkal University, Bhubaneshwar. After finishing his PhD from Institute of Physics, Bhubaneswar, in 2002, he was a DAE K.S. Krishnan Fellow and scientific officer at Variable Energy Cyclotron Centre till 2012. Meanwhile, he was a postdoctoral researcher at Lawrence Berkeley National Laboratory in 2006–2007, and Spectra Physics Working Group co-convenor of STAR Experiment at the Relativistic Heavy Ion Collider Facility, Brookhaven National Laboratory from 2006 to 2008. Later in May 2008, he was selected as the physics analysis coordinator of the STAR Experiment, with the responsibility to formulate the physics goals of the experiment, regulate and lead the publication of papers, maintenance of database, information and data records etc. From 2011 to 2014, he was the deputy spokesperson STAR Experiment, and was involved in taking all scientific and administrative decisions regarding function of the collaboration. He was the co-founder of the Beam Energy Scan Program at RHIC to study the QCD Phase Diagram. From 2012 onward, he has been the council member of STAR experiment at Brookhaven National Laboratory, USA. From 2013 onward, he has been the collaboration board member of ALICE experiment at the Large Hadron Collider Facility, CERN. From 2014, he has been the editorial board member of ALICE at LHC, CERN. He joined NISER in 2012 as an associate professor. He was the chairperson of School of Physical Sciences from 2013 to 2018. Currently professor, and dean of faculty affairs, NISER.

== Research ==
Dr. Mohanty has contributed to the establishment of the quark-hadron transition and first direct comparison between experimental high energy heavy-ion collisions data and QCD calculations. and "Physics World" considered it among the 10 best in the year 2011. His work in the STAR experiment has led to an exciting possibility of the existence of a critical point in the phase diagram of QCD. One of this work established the observable for the critical point search in the experiment. This is considered as a landmark work in the field. He has successfully led the beam energy scan physics program in this direction to publish important scientific papers in Physical Review Letters related to the QCD Critical Point. He was instrumental in pushing for such a program at Quark Matter 2009. Then demonstrated the readiness of the STAR detector and the Collider to undertake the proposed QCD critical point search and the exploration of the QCD phase diagram at RHIC.

He has made significant contribution to the discovery of the Quark Gluon Plasma (QGP) in the laboratory. This state of matter existed in the first few microsecond old Universe. In such matter, quarks and gluons are de-confined and move freely in volumes much larger than nucleonic scales. In order to achieve such matter in the laboratory, temperatures of the order of 10^{12} kelvins need to be created. The quark-gluon plasma allows for studying transport properties like viscosity, thermal conductivity, opacity and diffusion co-efficient of QCD matter. Dr. Mohanty has several significant papers on signatures that experimentally confirm the existence of QGP, related to observation of strangeness enhancement in heavy-ion collisions, jet quenching effect, and partonic collectivity.

Dr. Mohanty as the physics analysis coordinator of the STAR experiment led a team that discovered the heaviest known anti-matter nuclei the anti-alpha (consisting of two anti-protons and two anti-neutrons) in the laboratory. This measurement provided the probability of production of anti-helium through nuclear interactions, thereby providing the predominant baseline for measurements carried out in space. As the physics analysis leader led a team that discovered the heaviest strange anti-matter nuclei. Normal nuclei are formed only of protons and neutrons. Hyper-nuclei are made up of proton, neutron and a hyperon. The anti-hypertrion, nuclei consists of anti-proton, anti-neutron and anti-lambda (a strange hadron). It has implications for neutron stars and also understanding of the nuclear force.

J. D. Bjorken, Frank Wilczek and collaborators have advocated the existence of Disoriented Chiral Condensates (DCC) due to chiral phase transitions in QCD matter. The possibility of producing quark-gluon plasma in high energy collisions is an exciting one, from the point of view of observing the chiral phase transition as the hot plasma expands and cools. As the system returns to its normal phase it is possible for regions of misaligned vacuum to be produced. These domains, which are analogous to misaligned domains of a ferromagnet have been named Disoriented Chiral Condensates (DCCs). DCC's are regions where the chiral field is partially aligned in an isospin direction. These domains relax back to ground state configuration by emitting pions of particular species. Towards this goal and since neutral pion readily decays to photons, Dr. Mohanty has put in several years of dedicated efforts from his side to establish the photon production in heavy-ion collisions using a detector built in India and search for the signature of the chiral phase transition (through DCC). He is the lead author of the Physical Review Letters paper on inclusive photon production in heavy-ion collisions using the Indian detector. His contribution to photon production and to the physics of DCC in heavy-ion collisions led to the invitation from the editorial board of Physics Reports to write a review article, at the young age of 30 years.

== Awards ==
- 2021: Infosys Prize in Physical Sciences
- 2020: Fellow of American Physical Society
- 2017: J C Bose National Fellowship, Department of Science and Technology, Govt. of India
- 2017: Fellow of Indian Academy of Sciences, Bangalore
- 2017: Fellow of Indian National Science Academy New Delhi
- 2015: Shanti Swarup Bhatnagar Prize for Physical Sciences
- 2010-2011: SwarnaJayanti Fellowship - Department of Science and Technology, Govt. of. India
- 2010: Outstanding Research Investigator award - DAE-Science Research Council Fellowship - Govt. of India
- 2006: Young Scientist award – Department of Atomic Energy, Govt. of India
- 2003: Associate of Indian Science Academy, Bangalore
- 2003: INSA Young Scientist medal – Indian National Science Academy, New Delhi
- 2002: Dr. K. S. Krishnan Fellowship – Department of Atomic Energy and Board of Research in Nuclear Sciences, Govt. of India
- 2002: Best PhD thesis award in nuclear physics - Indian Physics Association
- 1996: University Gold Medal for performance in Masters in Science (Physics) - Utkal University, Bhubaneswar, India
