= National Institute of Science Education and Research =

Higher education institution in Bhubaneswar, India

- Motto: Vidyayā'mritamașnute
- Motto in English: Knowledge Imparts Immortality
- Affiliated University: Homi Bhabha National Institute
- Aided by: Department of Atomic Energy
- Type: Research Institution
- Established: 6 September 2007; 18 years ago
- Chairman: Secretary, Department of Atomic Energy (DAE) & Chairman, Atomic Energy Commission (AEC), Mumbai
- Director: Hirendra Nath Ghosh
- Location: Jatani, Odisha, India; 20.1717°N 85.6848°E
- Campus: 300 acres (120 ha)
- Colours: Blue & white
- Website: www.niser.ac.in

Location of NISER.

The National Institute of Science Education and Research or NISER, is an autonomous research institute in Jatani, Odisha, India, under the Department of Atomic Energy. The institute is affiliated by Homi Bhabha National Institute. Former Prime Minister Manmohan Singh laid the foundation stone on August 28, 2006, his Odisha visit led to establishing NISER to boost science education and expanding infrastructure to fight regional poverty. Government of India earmarked an initial outlay of ₹823.19 crore (US$85 million) during the first seven years of the project, starting in September 2007. The acceptance rate at the National Institute of Science Education and Research (NISER) for the flagship Integrated MSc program in natural sciences is highly competitive, typically hovering around 1% to 2%. HBNI(The parent institute of NISER, includes 10 constituent institutes and 2 off-campus institutes) was ranked second in the academic sector in the field of natural sciences nationally by the Nature Index 2024-25 (compiled by Nature Research).

Directors
- T K Chandrashekar, 2007-2014; V Chandrasekhar, 2014-2018; Sudhakar Panda, 2018-2023; Hirendra Nath Ghosh, 2023-present

== Campus ==
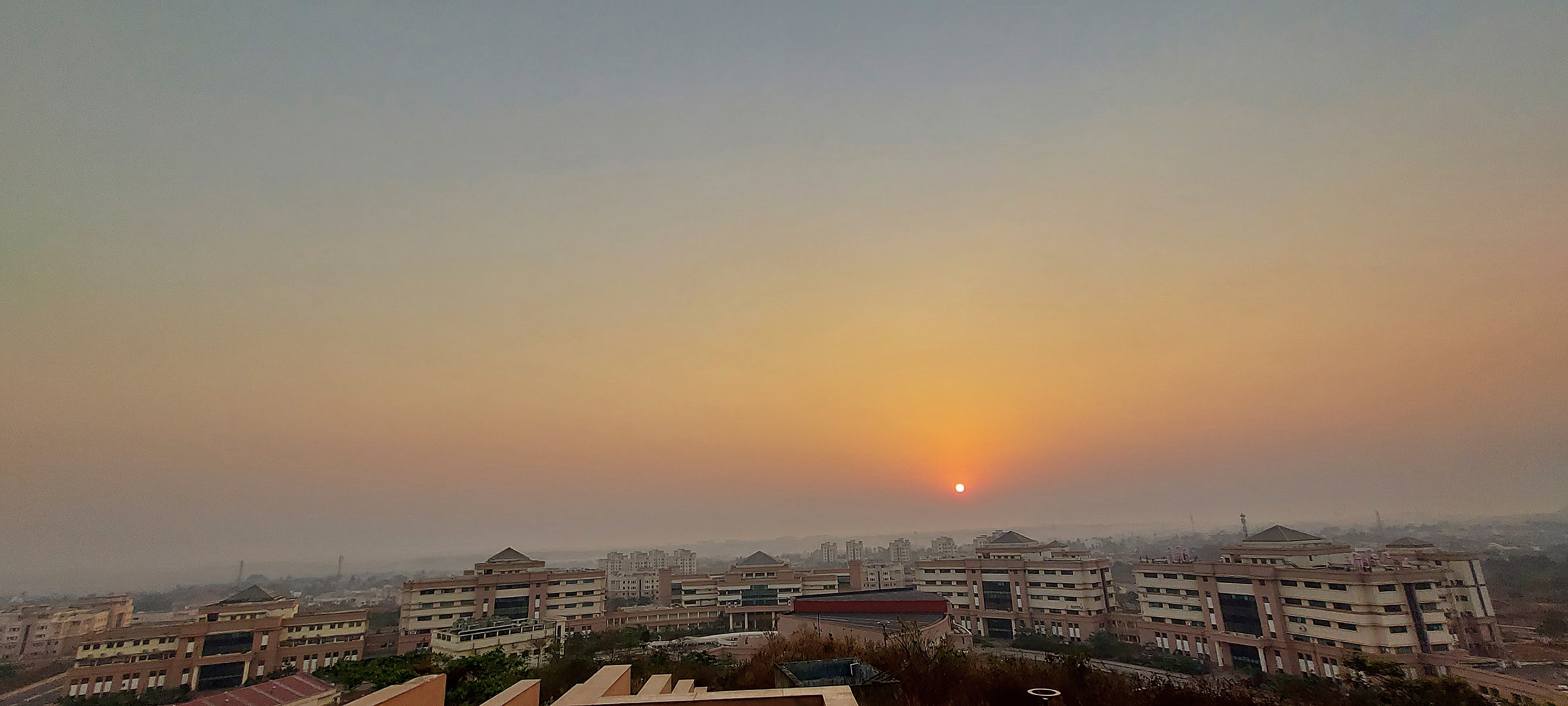
View from Meditation Center of NISER

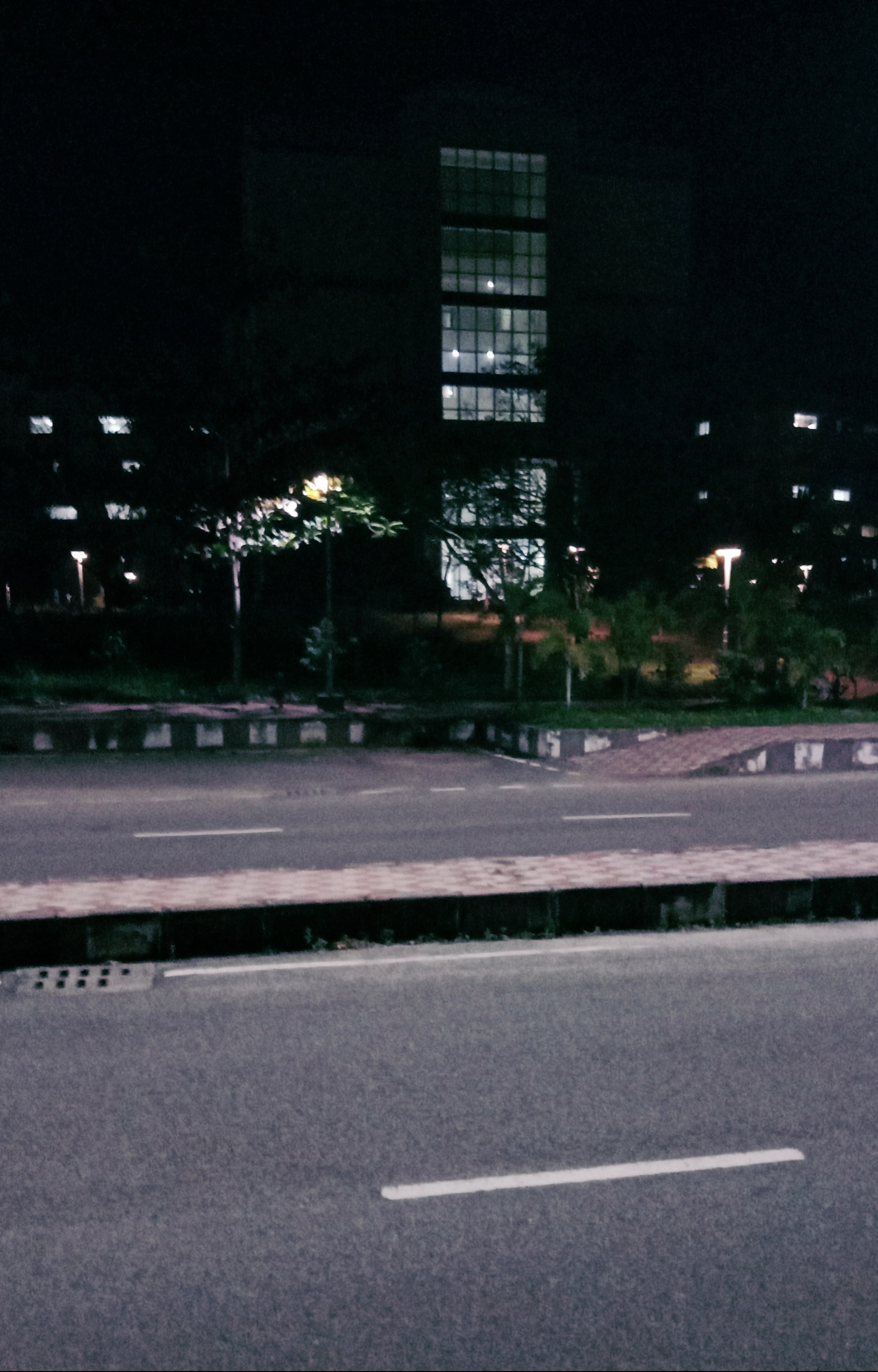
NISER campus at night

The Odisha government provided 300 acres (1.2 km^{2}) for the permanent campus near Barunei Hills, between Bhubaneswar, the state capital, and Khurda. This location is a few kilometres south-west of Bhubaneswar. The institute is located at Jatani, about 35 km from Biju Patnaik International Airport. The campus houses both academic and residential complexes. The academic complex consists of 72,700 m^{2} in eleven buildings, including the administrative block, schools of physics, chemistry, mathematics, biology and humanities and social sciences, library, auditorium and meditation centre. The residential township has a built up area of 10,200 m^{2} comprising nine buildings for hostels, faculty and staff quarters and a director's bungalow.

NISER started shifting to the new campus during the summer of 2015. The new students joined the permanent campus at Jatni and academic activities for the session 2015-16 started from the permanent campus. A separate 3-acre (12,000 m^{2}) campus near the Bhubaneswar city centre is also contemplated.

=== Amenities ===
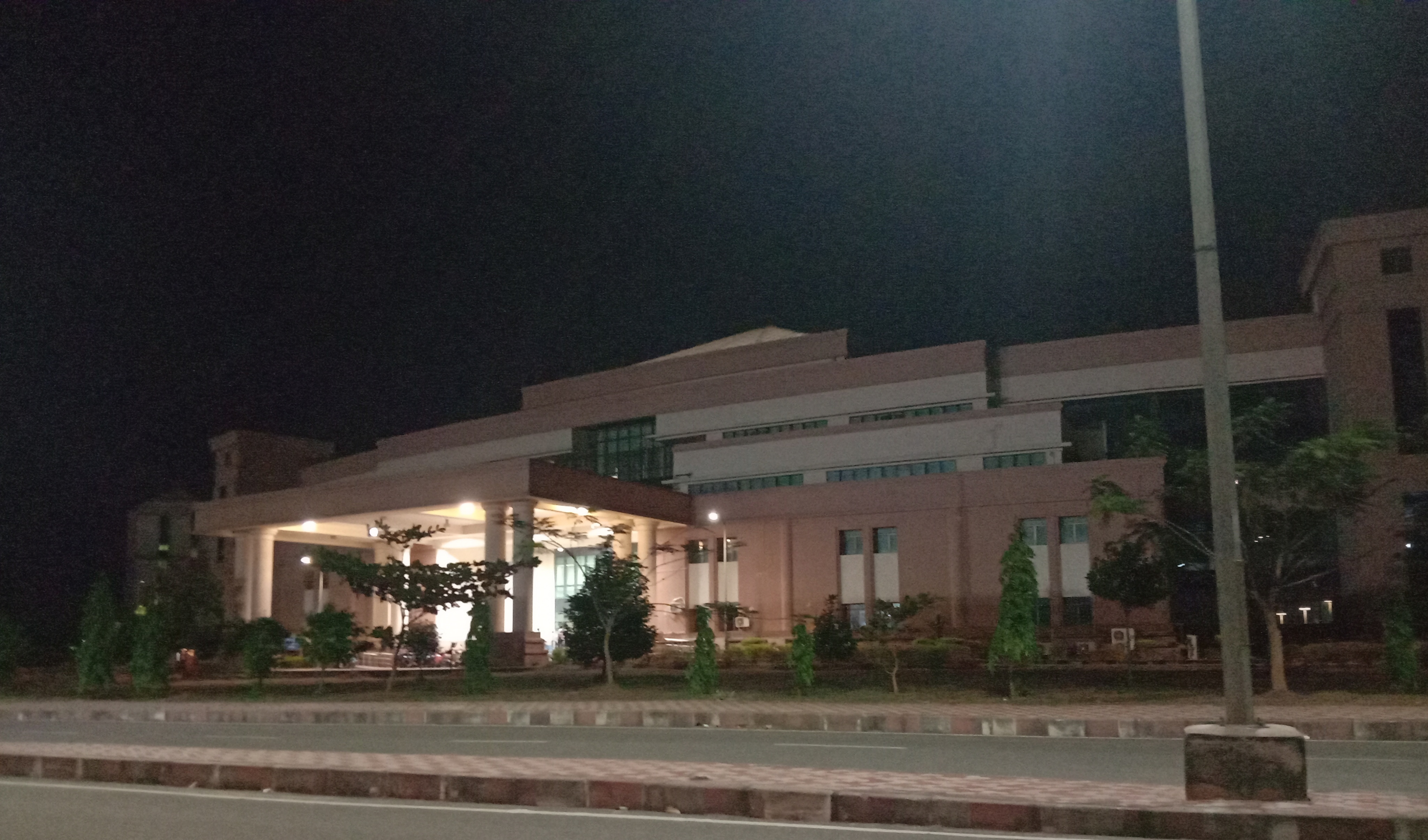
Central Library NISER

- Health Centre
- Community Centre
- Auditorium
- Meditation Centre
- Computer Centre with High-Performance Scientific Computing cluster like Kalinga Cluster and Hartree Cluster
- Accommodation & Transportation
- EMW Department
- Well Integrated Library
- Integrated Sports Complex for Basketball, Tennis, Volleyball, Cricket, Football, Table Tennis, Jogging track etc.
- Gym
- Shopping Complex

== Logo ==
The logo of the institute symbolises important aspects of the four major sciences. The DNA in the centre acknowledges the discovery of its double helix structure by Watson and Crick as a major breakthrough in biology, perhaps "the most important step forward in life sciences after Darwin's theory of evolution". The benzene ring on the left represents Kekule's radical ideas that revolutionised organic chemistry and stimulated the growth of quantum chemistry and quantum optics. The object on the right depicts a black hole's event horizon, representative of the major challenges presented by the black hole to the conceptual foundations of physics, and serves as a reminder of Chandrasekhar's seminal work based on the general theory of relativity. The ornamental fractal-like structure on the boundary portrays a genus-2 compact Riemann surface of constant negative curvature, meant to reflect the beauty and elegance of mathematics, the theory of Riemann surfaces having led to significant advances in physics and neuroimaging.

== Academics ==
=== Academic programmes ===
NISER is dedicated to undergraduate and graduate education and research only. It offers a five-year integrated M.Sc. as well as PhD degrees in pure and applied sciences. Degrees at NISER will be awarded by the Homi Bhabha National Institute (HBNI), a deemed-to-be University within the Department of Atomic Energy. Those performing well in the Integrated M.Sc. are offered chances to join R&D units and autonomous research institutions of the Department of Atomic Energy. Students with CGPA greater than 7.5 in the final semester exam have the chance to be directly called for interview (by skipping the main written exam) for the Bhabha Atomic Research Centre (BARC). Students seeking admission in Integrated M.Sc.-PhD programmes and M.Sc Medical and Radiological Physics in NISER need to give and qualify exams like Joint Admission Test for M.Sc. (JAM).(or JEST physics) Candidates are then screened by interviews for final admission. Candidates should have qualified a national level entrance exam for PhD program (like GATE, JGEEBILS, CSIR-NET, UGC-NET, etc.).

NISER has already started offering Integrated PhD programmes in various departments, starting with the School of Physical Sciences from 2016, and currently offers PhD programmes in all departments. The first batch of NISER students graduated in 2012 and many of them received PhD offers in several universities in India and abroad, starting a trend of excellent grad school placements for subsequent batches.

==== Integrated MSc program ====
Students get selected for the Integrated M.Sc. programme through a competitive annual examination called the National Entrance Screening Test (NEST). The first batch was admitted in September 2007. Admissions are highly selective: for instance, from more than 80,000 applicants nationwide in 2018, about 1,000 students were considered for admission to a cohort of approximately 200 students. Over the years, the exam has increasingly gained popularity among students aiming for a career in the sciences and has gotten increasingly competitive. It was estimated (in 2018) that more than 1,00,000 students will apply per year (in the following few years) to seek admission in any of the two institutions that admit students via NEST (NISER and CEBS).

==== PhD program ====
In 2010 January, NISER started offering a doctoral programme under the guidance of faculty members of NISER to students with a master's degree in basic sciences, e.g., Biology, Chemistry, Mathematics and Physics. To get admission, students have to qualify the – NET (CSIR/UGC) / GATE / NBHM or equivalent examination valid for the current year in the relevant area of research.

==== Integrated Doctoral Programme (Int. Ph.D.) ====
Integrated Ph.D. involves a master's degree (M.Sc.) followed by a doctorate (Ph.D.). Students after three years of undergraduate education can join the program.

==== M.Sc. in Medical and Radiological Physics Programme (CMRP, NISER) ====
The Centre was established by Prof. Dr. Bedangadas Mohanty in the year 2022.

From 2022 NISER started offering M.Sc. in Medical and Radiological physics in Centre for Medical and Radiation Physics(CMRP).

Selection procedure: 60% marks in B. Sc with physics as a main course and JAM / JEST exam scorecards. The shortlisting will be based on JAM / JEST marks, followed by interview for selection.

=== Curriculum ===
To broaden the intellectual horizon of the students, there are compulsory liberal arts courses drawing from Humanities and Social Sciences areas such as; Technical Communication, Sociology, Economics, Psychology, Philosophy, etc. Each of the undergraduate students carries out research projects that last more than a year. The training makes them ready to embark on a research career by the time they graduate from NISER.

=== Scholarships ===
NISER has been included in the list of a selected few institutions where students directly qualify to receive a scholarship under the Scholarship for Higher Education (SHE) category of the INSPIRE (Innovation in Science Pursuit for Inspired Research) programme launched by Department of Science & Technology, Government of India.

All admitted students receive a scholarship of ₹5,000 (US$52) per month under DAE-DISHA fellowship which may be sufficient to meet the course fees and boarding costs on campus. Students also receive a contingency grant of ₹20,000 (US$210) per year to facilitate their academic pursuits. Students may also avail the Kishore Vaigyanik Protsahan Yojana scholarship if they have qualified for it.

=== Admission ===
The National Entrance Screening Test or NEST is a compulsory test for admission to the 5-year Integrated MSc programme in basic sciences - Biology, Chemistry, Mathematics and Physics - at National Institute of Science Education and Research (NISER) and University of Mumbai - Department of Atomic Energy's UM-DAE CEBS, Mumbai. Both NISER and CEBS are autonomous institutions established by the Department of Atomic Energy, Government of India, in 2007.

Eligibility criteria for NEST-2022:-

- Candidates in General and OBC category should be born on or after August 1, 2002. The age limit is relaxed by 5 years for SC/ ST/ Divyangjan candidates.
- Class XII qualifying examination should be passed in either 2020 or 2021. Candidates appearing in 2022 are also eligible. (Where only Letter Grade is given by the Board, a certificate from the Board specifying equivalent percentage marks will be required. In the absence of such a certificate the decision of the respective Admission Committees will be final.)
- At least 60% marks in aggregate (or equivalent grade) in Class XII (or equivalent) examination from any recognized Board in India. For Scheduled Caste (SC), Scheduled Tribes (ST) candidates and for Divyangjan candidates, the minimum requirement is 55%.

== Organisation and administration ==
=== List of schools and departments ===
NISER has nine schools. They are:

- School of Biological Sciences (SBS)
- School of Chemical Sciences (SCS)
- School of Mathematical Sciences (SMS)
- School of Physical Sciences (SPS)
- School of Humanities and Social Sciences (SHSS)

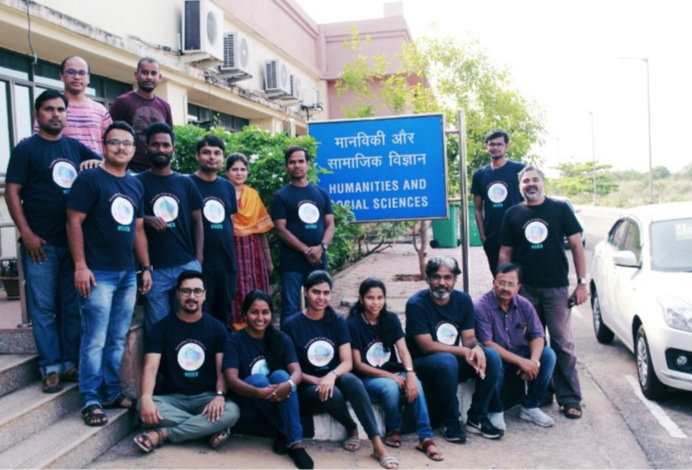
School of Humanities and Social Sciences

- School of Computer Sciences (SCoS)
- School of Earth and Planetary Sciences (SEPS)
- Centre for Medical and Radiation Physics (CMRP)
- Center for Interdisciplinary Sciences (CIS)

== Notable people ==
- Ashoke Sen, Professor (Honorary Fellow); Shanti Swarup Bhatnagar Prize in 1994; ICTP Prize in 1989; Fellow of the Indian Academy of Sciences in 1991; TWAS Prize 1997; Fellow of the Royal Society 1998; Fellow of the Indian National Science Academy in 1996; Padma Shri in 2001; Infosys Prize in the Mathematical Sciences, 2009; Fundamental Physics Prize, 2012, for his work on string theory; Padma Bhushan in 2013; M.P. Birla Memorial Award in 2013; Dirac Medal in 2014.
- Bedangadas Mohanty, Year 2015: Shanti Swarup Bhatnagar Prize for Physical Sciences; Year 2017: Fellow of Indian National Science Academy New Delhi. Year 2021: Infosys Prize for Physical Sciences.
- Vadapalli Chandrasekhar, Year 2003: Shanti Swarup Bhatnagar Prize for Chemical Sciences
- Tavarekere Kalliah Chandrashekar, Year 2001: Shanti Swarup Bhatnagar Prize for Chemical Sciences

== Student life ==
=== Annual festival ===
The students of NISER hold an annual cultural festival called Tvisha, which was initially known as Udbhava. Many activities like fashion shows, inter-college competitions such as short film competitions, treasure hunts, band wars, sports events, dance events, quizzes, debates and discussion on current issues, etc. are organised.

=== Utkal Dibas ===
Celebrated every year at NISER on 1 April in memory of the formation of the state as a separate state out of Bihar and Orissa Province with addition of Koraput and Ganjam from the Madras Presidency in 1936. All performances on Utkal Dibas are in Odia language.

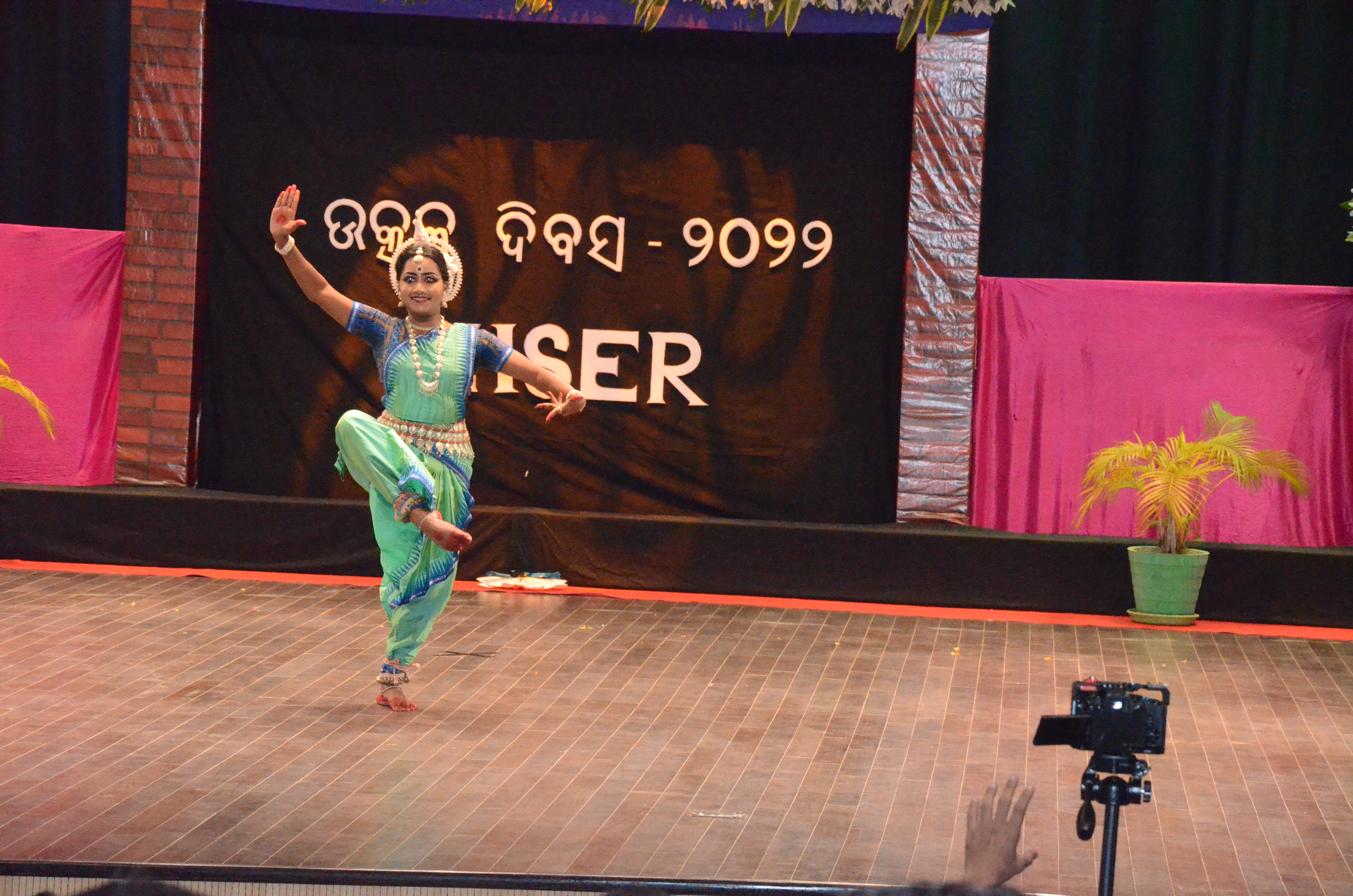
Utkal Dibas 2022

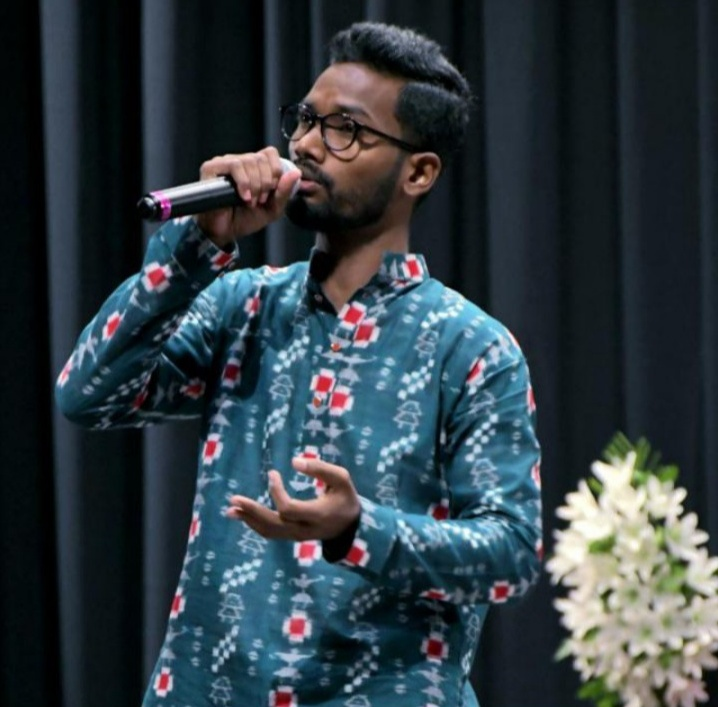
Odia Song at Utkal Dibas

=== Swacchta Pakhwada 2022 ===
Swachhata Pakhwada is observed with the objective of bringing a fortnight of intense focus on the issues and practices of Swacchata by engaging GOI Ministries/Departments in their jurisdiction.

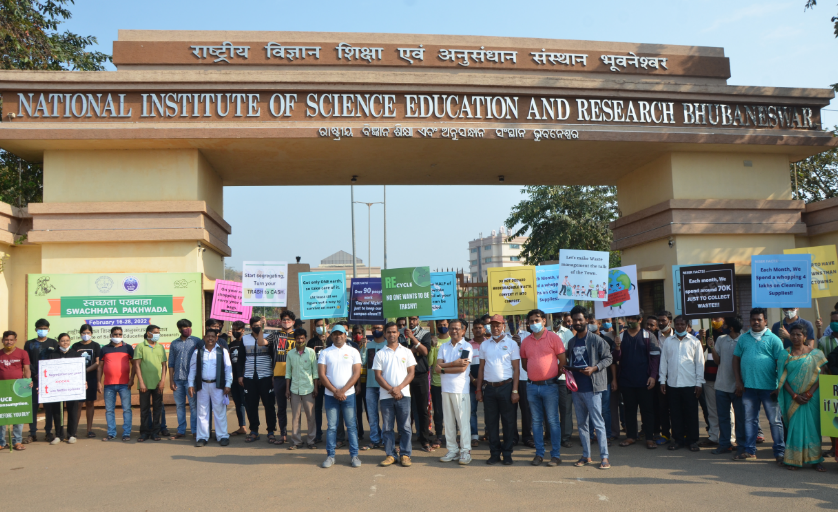
Swachhta Pakhwada 2022 observance at NISER

=== Fire Service Week 2022 ===
Fire service week was observed at NISER from 14 April to 20 April. NISER organised a training program to spread awareness to prevent fires. Fire-athon (marathon of 5 km,10 km) was also organised.

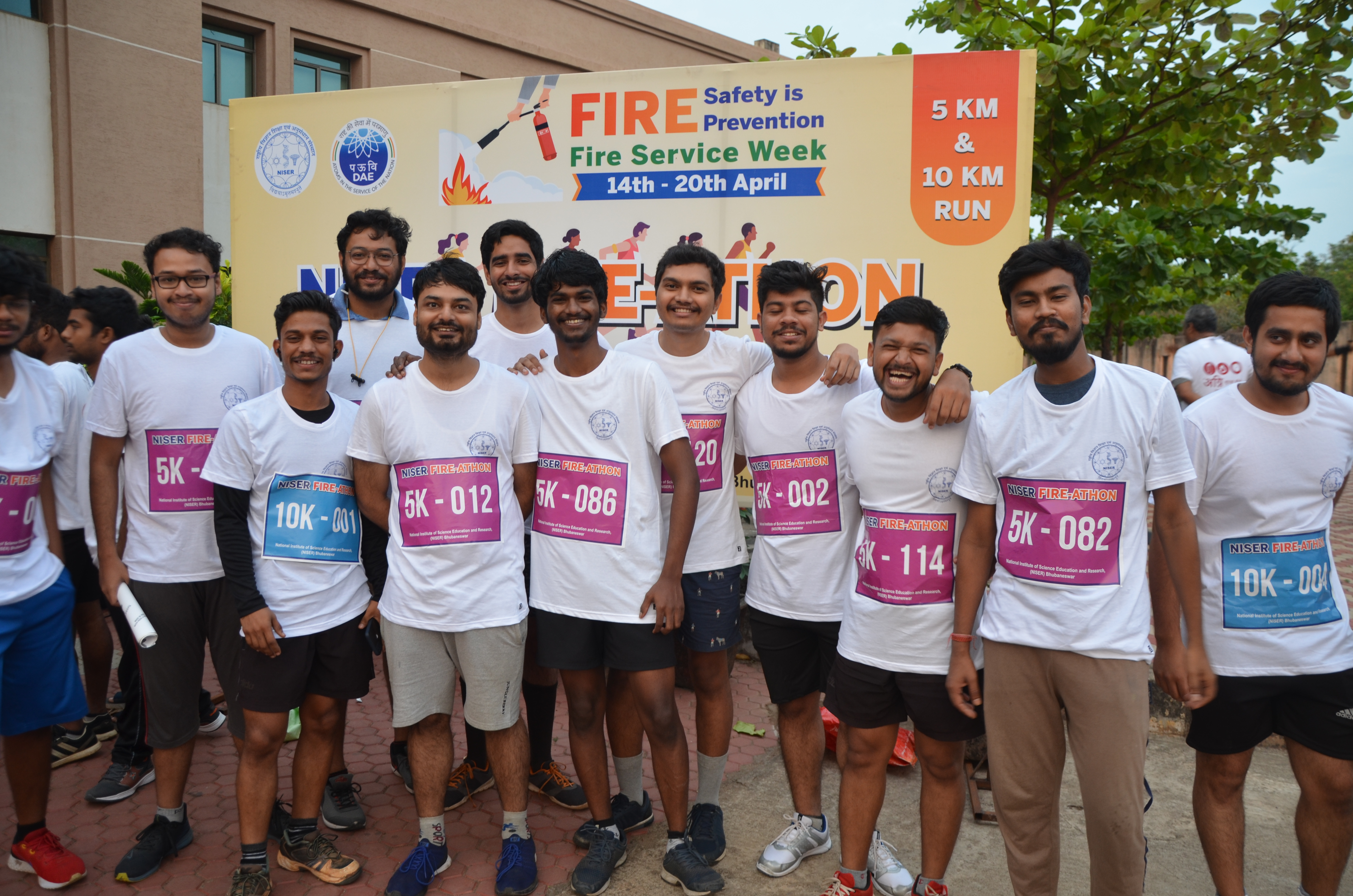
Fire Week obersevance at NISER, 2020

== See also ==
- List of universities in India
- List of autonomous higher education institutes in India
