= Arena Flowers =

British flower and gift retailer

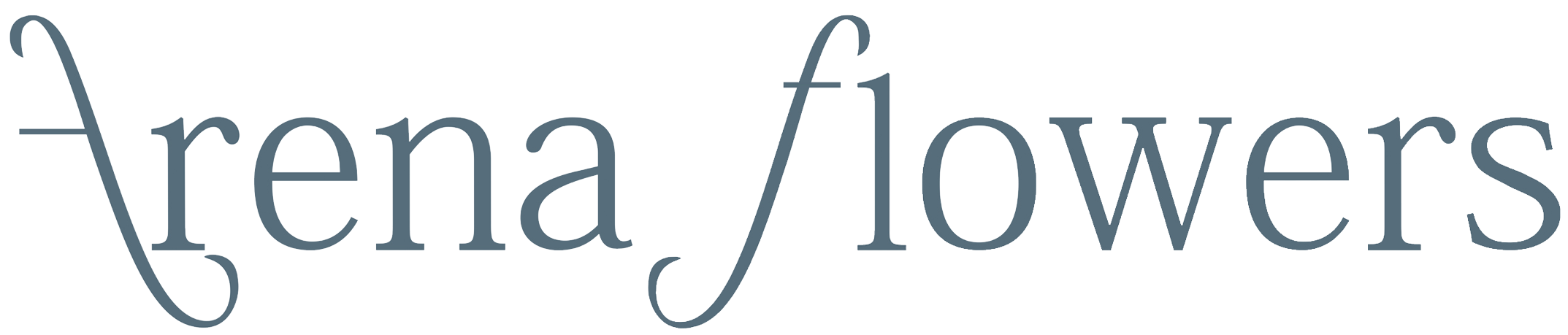
- Website type: Limited liability company
- Founded: 2006
- Headquarters: London, UK
- Founders: William Wynne; Steven France
- Industry: Retail
- Products: Flowers
- Website: www.arenaflowers.com

Arena Flowers is a flower and gifts retailer based in the United Kingdom. Arena Flowers launched its first website 2006. Arena Flowers is an e-commerce company that sells flowers originating from England, the Netherlands and Africa as well as through bilateral fulfilment agreements worldwide.

== Background ==
Arena Flowers, based in Worcestershire, was launched in August 2006 by William Wynne and Steven France. France and Wynne are friends from the University of Oxford.

== Ethical flowers ==
From inception Arena Flowers supplied ethically produced flowers. Arena was the first UK member of Fair Flowers Fair Plants, an important ethical flowers standard, in 2008 Arena Flowers won the IMRGËs Online Green Awards for small retailers and, in 2013, Arena Flowers was formally accredited as a Fairtrade UK flower supplier (as of February 2014, one of only 8 UK organisations to be so accredited.

Arena Flowers is one of only two specialist UK florists with a Fairtrade certification. In 2020 the company came top of the Good Shopping Guide's comparison table of ethical flower delivery companies with a 100% rating, and was rated number one by Country Living UK for ethical flower deliver services. Arena Flowers has a Butterfly Mark from Positive Luxury, which is a third-party accreditation mark that recognises that the brand meets the highest standards of verified innovation and environmental performance, based on their use of environmentally friendly packaging, energy efficiency, and worker's welfare programmes.

=== Charitable ===
Arena has a number of charitable partners:

- The British Heart Foundation
- Crisis
- Women's Aid
