= The People's Pension =

British workplace pension scheme

The People's Pension is a British trust-based defined contribution workplace pension scheme for non-associated employers, commonly referred to as a master trust. After the UK's Pensions Act 2008 established new duties requiring employers to automatically enrol eligible workers into a workplace pension plan that meets certain minimum standards, the People's Pension was set up in 2011 by B&CE (now called People's Partnership) for employers requiring a scheme to fulfil their duties under the Act from October 2012. The People's Pension announced that its number of members had surpassed 1 million in September 2014.

In February 2025, following a review of its responsible investment policy, People's Pension withdrew £28 billion from State Street, in response to the company's retreat from Environmental, Social, and Governance principles. The People’s Pension redistributed £20 billion in developed market equity mandate managed by Amundi and invested a further £8 billion in fixed-income assets managed by Invesco. The People’s Pension retained just £5 billion with State Street, which had previously managed all of its assets.

Mark Condron, chair of trustees for The People’s Pension, explained that Amundi and Invesco were selected to "prioritise sustainability, active stewardship and long-term value creation".

In February 2025, it was reported that the People's Pension fund was valued at £33 billion and was forecast to reach £60 billion by the end of the decade.
