= National Employment Savings Trust =

Workplace pension scheme in the UK

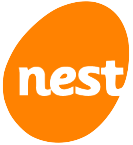
- Type: Public corporation (non-departmental public body)
- Industry: Pensions; asset management
- Founded: 2008
- Headquarters: London, United Kingdom
- Area served: United Kingdom
- Key people: Brendan McCafferty (chair); Ian Cornelius (CEO)
- Products: Defined contribution workplace pension scheme
- Services: Automatic enrolment pension provision; investment management
- AUM: £49.7 billion (31 March 2025)
- Owner: Accountable to Parliament via the Department for Work and Pensions (sponsor department)
- Members: 13.8 million (31 March 2025)
- Website: nestpensions.org.uk

The National Employment Savings Trust (Nest, sometimes branded Nest Pensions) is the United Kingdom’s public-service defined contribution workplace pension scheme, created to support automatic enrolment under the Pensions Act 2008. It is run by Nest Corporation, a public corporation (non-departmental public body) accountable to Parliament through the Department for Work and Pensions (DWP). Nest has a public service obligation to accept any employer that wishes to use the scheme to meet automatic-enrolment duties.

As of 31 March 2025, Nest reported managing about £49.7 billion on behalf of around 13.8 million members. Nest is an authorised master trust supervised by The Pensions Regulator.

== History ==
The 2006 Pensions Commission recommended a low-cost, national workplace pension scheme to extend coverage to workers underserved by the existing pensions market. The Pensions Act 2007 established the Personal Accounts Delivery Authority (PADA) to develop the model, and the Pensions Act 2008 created Nest (originally known as Personal Accounts). PADA’s responsibilities later transferred to Nest Corporation, the scheme trustee.

Nest began accepting employers in 2011 to support the rollout of automatic enrolment from 2012. In April 2014, Nest announced that it had over one million members saving in the scheme. From April 2017, scheme-specific contribution caps and transfer restrictions were removed; transfers in and out are now permitted, subject to HMRC and scheme rules. In 2019, Nest received master trust authorisation from The Pensions Regulator.

In February 2022, an independent review commissioned by the Department for Work and Pensions concluded that Nest had met its objectives in supporting automatic enrolment and was providing value for money for members.

== Governance and status ==
Nest is operated by Nest Corporation, which acts as the scheme trustee. Nest Corporation is a public corporation sponsored by DWP; its Chair and Trustee Members are appointed through the public appointments process. Nest’s public service obligation requires it to accept any employer wishing to use the scheme for automatic enrolment. An Employers' Panel and Members' Panel advise on the scheme's operation and development.

== Regulation and authorisation ==
Nest is an authorised master trust under the regime introduced by the Pension Schemes Act 2017 and is supervised by The Pensions Regulator; Nest received authorisation in 2019.

== Scale and finances ==
As of 31 March 2025, Nest reported approximately 13.8 million members and £49.7 billion in assets under management. In 2024/25, Nest received an average of £663 million in new contributions each month. Approximately £10.6 billion (around 21% of assets) was invested in the UK.

Nest Corporation was initially funded by a loan from the Department for Work and Pensions to cover establishment and operating costs. In 2024/25, Nest recorded its first annual profit (£11.9 million) and began repaying the loan. The loan is forecast to be repaid in full by 2038.

== Charges ==
Nest does not levy charges on employers for using the scheme.

Members pay two charges: a 1.8% contribution charge on each new contribution, and a 0.3% annual management charge (AMC) on the total value of the pot. These equate to an effective annual charge of less than 0.5% over the long term. Nest does not charge for transfers in or out, switching funds, or changing a retirement date. Default arrangements used for automatic enrolment are subject to a statutory charge cap of 0.75% a year (or an equivalent combination), excluding specified costs and transaction costs.

== Contributions ==
Under UK automatic-enrolment rules, the legal minimum for a qualifying defined contribution scheme is a total contribution of 8% of qualifying earnings, with at least 3% from the employer and the balance from the worker (including tax relief). This level has applied since 6 April 2019 after a phased increase from earlier, lower rates. The Department for Work and Pensions reviews the earnings trigger and the qualifying-earnings band each tax year.

=== How contributions are calculated ===
By default Nest uses the statutory qualifying-earnings basis. Employers may instead certify on an alternative earnings basis where the scheme still meets minimum quality standards (for example, using basic pay or all earnings).

=== Tax relief ===
Nest operates relief at source. Member contributions are paid net of basic-rate income tax and Nest claims the 20% relief and adds it to the pot, including for members who do not pay income tax. Higher- and additional-rate taxpayers can claim any extra relief through Self Assessment or HMRC adjustment.

=== Opt-out and re-enrolment ===
A worker who is automatically enrolled may opt out within one month and receive a refund of their own contributions. Employers must repeat the assessment and re-enrol eligible staff roughly every three years.

Prior to the introduction of automatic enrolment, the Department for Work and Pensions estimated that around 28% of workers would opt out; in practice, Nest has reported an overall opt-out rate of around 8% since the scheme began.

=== Limits and HMRC allowances ===
Since 1 April 2017 there has been no Nest-specific cap on the amount that can be paid in, and individual transfers in are permitted; transfers out are also allowed. Contributions remain subject to HMRC rules, including the annual allowance (currently £60,000 for most people) and the money purchase annual allowance for those who have flexibly accessed defined contribution savings.

== Investment approach ==
Members who are automatically enrolled into Nest are usually placed in a Nest Retirement Date Fund, which follows a life-stage approach with four phases: foundation, growth, consolidation, and post-retirement. The default funds target returns of CPI plus 3% after charges; for the ten years to 31 March 2025, the Nest 2045 Fund reported annualised returns of 7.2% against a 6.3% benchmark.

Members can change funds after enrolment, with alternative fund choices including the Nest Ethical Fund, Nest Sharia Fund, Nest Higher Risk Fund, Nest Lower Growth Fund, Nest Guided Retirement Fund, and Nest Ready to Retire Fund.

Nest uses multiple external investment managers across different asset classes. Over 16% of assets are invested in illiquid assets including private equity, private credit, direct property, and infrastructure. Nest integrates environmental, social and governance (ESG) considerations into its investment process and is a signatory to the UK Stewardship Code.

== Retirement options ==
At retirement, members can defer, withdraw cash (in full or in part), transfer to another fund or pension scheme, or purchase an annuity. Members in the default strategy who pass their intended retirement date without making a choice are automatically moved into the Nest Guided Retirement Fund or Nest Ready to Retire Fund, depending on their pot size.

== See also ==
- Pensions in the United Kingdom
- Auto-enrolment in the Republic of Ireland
- Canada Pension Plan
- KiwiSaver
- The People's Pension
