= B&CE =

British financial services company

Organisation wordmark

B&CE is a not-for-profit financial services company based in Crawley, West Sussex. The company provides insurance-based products to people working in the UK construction industry.

== Group Structure ==
Building and Civil Engineering Holidays Scheme Management Limited (“the Company”) is a company limited by guarantee. It administers the Building and Civil Engineering Benefits Scheme and is also the appointed administrator of the Construction Workers' Charitable Trust. The Company has two wholly owned subsidiaries; B&CE Insurance Limited and B&CE Financial Services Limited. B&CE Insurance Limited was established with an objective to offer appropriate insurance based products to all who work in the construction industry. B&CE Financial Services Limited is the administrator for a number of the pension schemes operated by B&CE. It is also the promotional and marketing arm of the Group, distributing any ‘re-badged’ products that B&CE offers in partnership with other financial services providers. Collectively the Company and its subsidiaries are referred to as B&CE.

== History ==
In 1938 a Committee on Holidays with Pay, chaired by Baron Amulree looked into the provision of holidays in the construction industry. They found that very few construction workers received paid holidays because they moved jobs too frequently or they were laid off before the holiday period. The industry’s solution was to set up a company to provide a centralised “holidays with pay” arrangement. The company was set up in 1942 by trades unions and the employers’ organisations with equal board representation from both groups and an independent chairman, a structure that exists to this day.

== Development ==
Over the past seventy years the B&CE group has created a range of financial products to meet the needs of construction workers. Today, B&CE offerings include a stakeholder pension, employee accident and life cover and employee healthcare. In 2011, B&CE launched The People’s Pension, to help employers to comply with their automatic enrolment duties. This is first of B&CE’s products to be available to employers from any industry sector.

== The Benefits Scheme ==
The Building and Civil Engineering Benefits Scheme is believed to be unique in the UK in that it is a pension scheme that provides only tax free lump sum retirement benefits to members. The Benefits Scheme is now closed to new contributions but continues to pay benefits when due. At 31 March 2014 there were 1,115,158 members for whom B&CE had recorded reckonable service. Because of its unique structure, the Scheme is excluded from surveys conducted by the Office for National Statistics.

== Construction Workers' Charitable Trust ==
The Construction Workers’ Charitable Trust is the new name for the B&CE Charitable Trust. While the name has changed, the support the Charitable Trust provide to people working in construction, including many of their members, remains exactly the same.

The Charitable Trust was set up in 1991 to give back to the construction industry. It has helped thousands of people and funded research into occupational health and safety in the construction industry.

The Charity offers financial assistance to construction workers and their families who are suffering hardship. The principal aim of the Trust is to ease the financial distress that illness or changes in domestic circumstances can cause.

== See also ==
The following organisations are represented on the board of B&CE.

- Unite the Union
- Civil Engineering Contractors Association (CECA)
- UCATT
- GMB
- Federation of Master Builders (FMB)
- Scottish Building Federation
- National Federation of Builders
