= Vadapalli Chandrasekhar =

Indian chemist (born 1958)

- Born: 6 November 1958 (age 67); Kolkata, West Bengal, India
- Education: Osmania University; Indian Institute of Science; University of Massachusetts, Amherst
- Known for: Studies on the chemistry of inorganic clusters and rings
- Awards: 1989 INSA Young Scientist Medal; 2002 CRSI Bronze Medal; 2003 Shanti Swarup Bhatnagar Prize; 2003 AvHF Friedrich-Wilhelm-Bessel Award; 2011 CRSI Silver Medal
- Scientific career
- Fields: Bioorganic chemistry; Supramolecular chemistry
- Workplaces: Indian Petrochemicals Corporation Limited; IIT Kanpur Tata Institute of Fundamental Research; National Institute of Science Education and Research; University of Calgary; University of Göttingen; University of Tsukuba; University of Würzburg
- Doctoral advisor: S. S. Krishnamurthy; Robert R. Holmes

Vadapalli Chandrasekhar (born 6 November 1958) is an Indian inorganic and organometallic chemist and is currently a distinguished professor and the centre director of the Tata Institute of Fundamental Research Hyderabad. He is known for his studies on the chemistry of inorganic clusters and rings and is an elected fellow of the Indian National Science Academy National Academy of Sciences, India, The World Academy of Sciences and the Indian Academy of Sciences The Council of Scientific and Industrial Research, the apex agency of the Government of India for scientific research, awarded him the Shanti Swarup Bhatnagar Prize for Science and Technology, one of the highest Indian science awards, in 2003, for his contributions to chemical sciences.

== Biography ==
Vadapalli Chandrasekhar, born on 6 November 1958 in Kolkata, in the Indian state of West Bengal, graduated in chemistry in 1975 and completed his post graduate studies in 1977 at Osmania University before enrolling for doctoral studies at Indian Institute of Science under the guidance of S. S. Krishnamurthy. After securing a PhD in 1982, he moved to the University of Massachusetts, Amherst in 1983 and completed his post-doctoral studies at the laboratory of Robert R. Holmes in 1986. He returned to India the same year and started his career as a senior research officer at Indian Petrochemicals Corporation Limited but his stay there lasted only one year. In 1987, he joined IIT Kanpur as an assistant professor to commence a service which would extend till 2012; during this period, he held various positions such as that of an associate professor (1991–1995), professor (1995–), head of the department of chemistry (2008–2010) and dean of faculty affairs (2011–2012). His next move was to Tata Institute of Fundamental Research at their Hyderabad research station as a senior professor and dean and in 2014, he shifted to National Institute of Science Education and Research where he served as the director until 2017 before moving to his current position at TIFR Hyderabad. He has also served as a visiting faculty or fellow at various institutions such as University of Calgary, University of Göttingen, University of Tsukuba, and University of Würzburg. He is currently serving as Head of the Department of Chemistry (RK Damani School of Natural Sciences) in Ashoka University.

== Legacy ==
Chandrasekhar's researches on the chemistry of inorganic clusters and rings are reported have led to a better understanding about a number of synthetic and structural problems. He is known to have worked extensively on developing new protocols for synthesizing the assembly of organotin clusters, multi-metal assemblies, cages and supramolecules as well as on inorganic-cored starburst molecules and polymeric ligands. He developed many new courses at under-graduate and graduate levels at IIT Kanpur and his teaching materials during this period have been compiled as a book, Inorganic and Organometallic Polymers. He has also contributed chapters to books authored/edited by others and has published several peer-reviewed articles; the online repository of the Indian Academy of Sciences has listed 132 of them.

== Awards and honors ==
Chandrasekhar, a Lalit Kapoor Chair Professor at IIT Kanpur during 2006–09, received the Young Scientist Medal of the Indian National Science Academy in 1989 and the CRSI Bronze Medal Medal of the Chemical Research Society of India in 2002; CRSI would honor him again with the Silver Medal in 2011. The Council of Scientific and Industrial Research awarded him the Shanti Swarup Bhatnagar Prize, one of the highest Indian science awards, in 2003. The same year, he received the Friedrich-Wilhelm-Bessel Award of the Alexander von Humboldt Foundation. Holder of J. C. Bose National Fellowship of the Department of Science and Technology in 2007 and Homi Bhabha Fellowship during 1999–2000, he was elected as a fellow by the Indian Academy of Sciences in 2003 and he became an elected fellow of the Indian National Science Academy and the National Academy of Sciences, India in 2007 and The World Academy of Sciences in 2009. He is currently on the editorial board of Dalton Transactions, a prominent journal published by the Royal Society of Chemistry.

== See also ==
- Organotin
- Supramolecule
- Ligands
