= Springboard Foundation =

Filipino foundation

- Founded: November 15, 2002
- Type: Non-profit, Interest group
- Location: Parañaque, Philippines
- Key people: John Milne and Annette Helbig
- Website: www.springboard-foundation.org

Springboard Foundation (SBF) is a non-government organization based in the Philippines that aids children.

== Overview ==
SBF is headed by John Milne, Chairman of the Board and Annette Helbig, President and CEO. It was registered last November 15, 2002 at the Philippine Security and Exchange Commission as a non-stock and non-profit corporation by five incorporators, whose aim is to provide a positive and caring environment for poor Filipino children. This fund raising foundation in Parañaque has five Board of Trustees. The foundation consists only of one regular staff, one project-based staff, one part-time staff and several volunteers at present. Membership fees and donations from individuals and from corporations are its main source of income.

One of the main goals of SBF is to address the high volume of out of school youth in the Philippines by building schools as well as provide scholarship programs to deserving and qualified candidates. Malnutrition in the Philippines is also a problem that SBF is continuously working on with its numerous partners and sponsors thru their feeding programs. Quick access to health care is also another objective that SBF tries to continuously provide to its benefactors with the help of their partners thru hospital renovations, donation of medical equipment and medicines.

SBF supports their beneficiaries through their own programs but they also team up with other organizations to widen their reach. HOPE Worldwide Philippines, one of the main beneficiaries of SBF that also concentrates on the welfare and development of at risk Filipino children from selected parts of Manila, is by far the beneficiary that has received the biggest chunk of assistance from the foundation amounting to more than 12 million pesos worth of cash and in kind donation. As of November 2011, SBF has a total of 59 beneficiaries that have received support from the foundation.

== Live Match ==
Live Match is the most notable event that Springboard Foundation has when it comes to raising funds for their projects and beneficiaries. Live Match is a live professional boxing event that features professional Filipino boxers as well as amateur fighters. As of 2007, SBF had held Live Match Events for four consecutive years.

During the first ever Live Match event last 2004, the foundation was able to collect a net total of 2 million pesos from individuals and organizations who attended the fundraising. In 2005, Live Match II was attended by more than 600 SBF supporters and the foundation was able to rake in a total of 2 million pesos at the end of the day. In 2006 the foundation was able to collect a total of 2.3 million pesos, which were later distributed to 11 SBF beneficiaries. The fourth Live Match, held in 2007, amassed over 2 million pesos, with most of the money coming from auctioning items like a signed and authenticated boxing glove of Muhammad Ali for the price of Php 150,000 and Lance Armstrong’s signed 2005 Tour de France jersey for Php 80,000.
