= Sankaran Thayumanavan =

Indian-American chemist

- Born: Tamil Nadu, India
- Other name: Thai Thayumanavan
- Citizenship: Indian-American
- Education: American College, Madurai (B.Sc., 1987; M.Sc., 1989); University of Illinois at Urbana–Champaign (Ph.D., 1996)
- Alma mater: American College, Madurai; University of Illinois at Urbana–Champaign
- Known for: Amphiphilic homopolymers Supramolecular polymer chemistry Drug delivery systems Polymer nanogels
- Awards: Fellow of the American Association for the Advancement of Science (2010); Chancellor's Medal, UMass (2014); Chemical Research Society of India Medal (2016); Distinguished Graduate Mentor Award (2019); Mahoney Life Sciences Prize (2019)
- Scientific career
- Fields: Polymer chemistry Organic chemistry Supramolecular chemistry Drug delivery Nanotechnology
- Workplaces: University of Massachusetts Amherst; Tulane University
- Thesis: (1996)

Sankaran "Thai" Thayumanavan is an Indian-American chemist, who is currently a Distinguished Professor of Chemistry at the University of Massachusetts Amherst. He is known for his work in polymer chemistry. He is a Fellow of the American Association for the Advancement of Science (AAAS).

== Early life and education ==
Thayumanavan grew up in the cities of Tirunelveli and Madurai in the southern state of Tamil Nadu in India. He obtained his B.Sc. (1987) and M.Sc. (1989) degrees in the American College, Madurai, India. He was awarded his Ph.D. in organic chemistry at the University of Illinois at Urbana–Champaign in 1996. His postdoctoral work was carried out with Seth Marder at the California Institute of Technology.

== Career ==
Thayumanavan started his academic career as a faculty member at Tulane University. He moved to the University of Massachusetts Amherst in 2003, where he is currently a Distinguished Professor in the Chemistry Department and Biomedical Engineering Department. He is also the Director of the Center for Bioactive Delivery at the Institute for Applied Life Sciences. In 2010 he was elected a Fellow of the AAAS "for distinguished contributions to supramolecular polymer chemistry". Thayumanavan’s early work involved contributions to the design, syntheses, and self-assembly behavior of amphiphilic homopolymers. His research in molecular design principles from physical organic chemistry to synthetic chemistry and supramolecular polymer chemistry for applications in materials and biomedicine.

== Awards ==
- 2010 – Elected Fellow of the American Association for the Advancement of Science
- 2014 – Chancellor’s Medal, UMass
- 2016 – Chemical Research Society of India Medal
- 2019 – Distinguished Graduate Mentor Award
- 2019 – Mahoney Life Sciences Prize

== Selected publications ==
- Ambade, Ashootosh V.; Savariar, Elamprakash N.; Thayumanavan, S. (2005). "Dendrimeric Micelles for Controlled Drug Release and Targeted Delivery". Molecular Pharmaceutics. 2 (4): 264–272. doi:10.1021/mp050020d. ISSN 1543-8384. PMC 2580075. PMID 16053329.
- Savariar, Elamprakash N.; Aathimanikandan, Sivakumar V.; Thayumanavan, S. (2006). "Supramolecular Assemblies from Amphiphilic Homopolymers: Testing the Scope". Journal of the American Chemical Society. 128 (50): 16224–16230. doi:10.1021/ja065213o. ISSN 0002-7863. PMC 2526122. PMID 17165775.
- Klaikherd, Akamol; Nagamani, Chikkannagari; Thayumanavan, S. (2009). "Multi-Stimuli Sensitive Amphiphilic Block Copolymer Assemblies". Journal of the American Chemical Society. 131 (13): 4830–4838. doi:10.1021/ja809475a. ISSN 0002-7863. PMC 2693022. PMID 19290632.
- Chacko, Reuben T.; Ventura, Judy; Zhuang, Jiaming; Thayumanavan, S. (2012). "Polymer nanogels: A versatile nanoscopic drug delivery platform". Advanced Drug Delivery Reviews. 64 (9): 836–851. doi:10.1016/j.addr.2012.02.002. ISSN 0169-409X. PMC 3359494. PMID 22342438.
- Zhuang, Jiaming; Gordon, Mallory R.; Ventura, Judy; Li, Longyu; Thayumanavan, S. (2013). "Multi-stimuli responsive macromolecules and their assemblies". Chemical Society Reviews. 42 (17): 7421–7435. doi:10.1039/c3cs60094g. ISSN 0306-0012. PMC 3740153. PMID 23765263.
- Li, Longyu; Raghupathi, Kishore; Song, Cunfeng; Prasad, Priyaa; Thayumanavan, S. (2014). "Self-assembly of random copolymers". Chemical Communications. 50 (88): 13417–13432. doi:10.1039/C4CC03688C. ISSN 1359-7345. PMC 4192032. PMID 25036552.
