= Karl M. Kadish =

American chemist

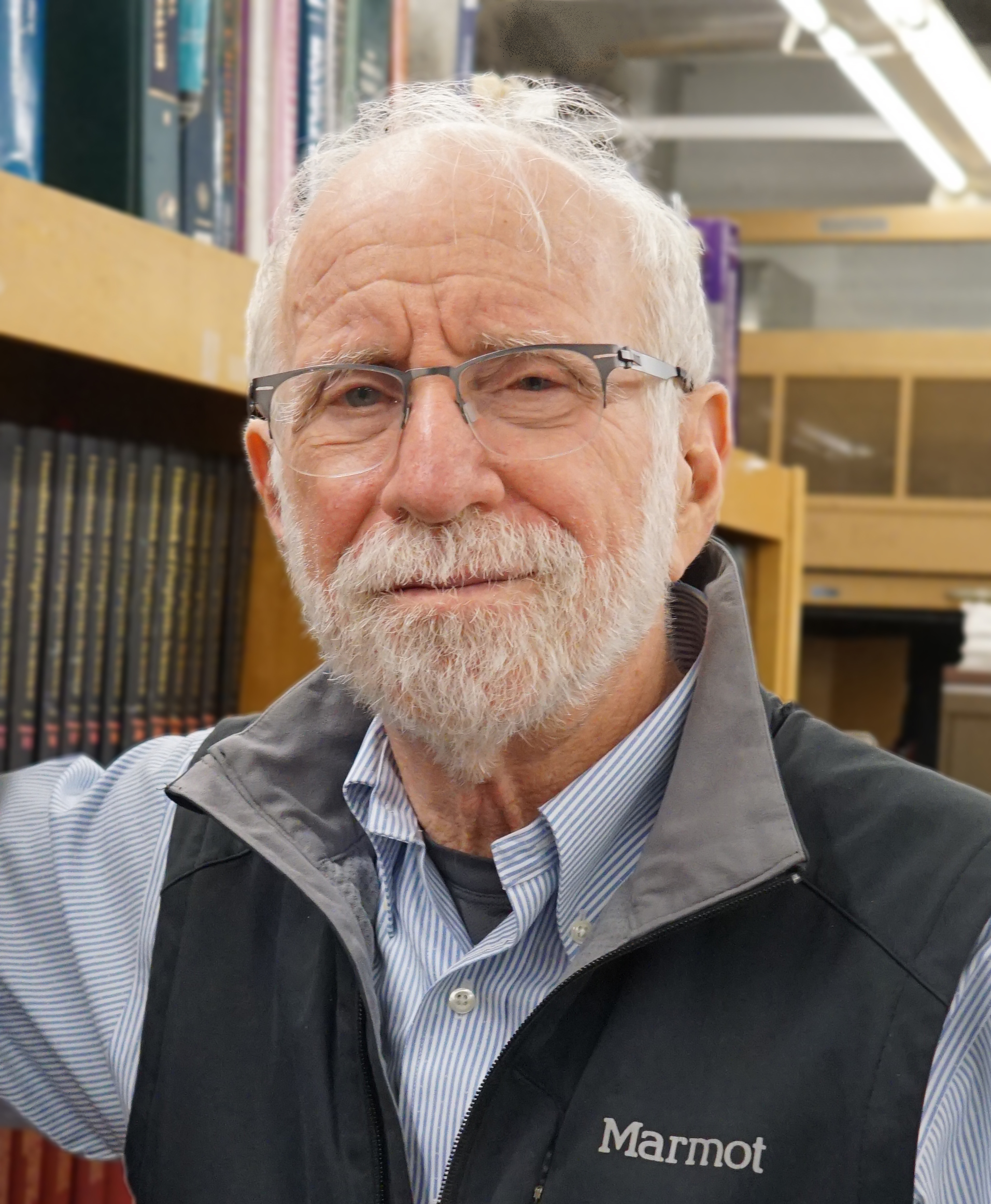
- Born: 1945 (age 80–81)
- Education: University of Michigan; B.S., 1967; Pennsylvania State University; PhD, 1970
- Scientific career
- Fields: Analytical chemistry Inorganic chemistry

Karl M. Kadish (born 1945) is an American chemist. He is currently Hugh Roy and Lillie Cranz Cullen University Professor at the University of Houston.

== Career ==
Dr. Kadish received his B.S. from the University of Michigan in 1967 and his PhD from Pennsylvania State University in 1970. After completing a postdoctoral fellowship at Louisiana State University, New Orleans (LSUNO), he spent one year as Chargé de Research at the University of Paris VI in France. He was an assistant professor at California State University, Fullerton from 1972 to 1976 and has been at the University of Houston since 1976, where he holds the position of Hugh Roy and Lillie Cranz Cullen University Professor in the Department of Chemistry. Dr. Kadish has also held visiting professorships at Osaka University (Japan), the University of Sydney (Australia), the California Institute of Technology, the University of Rome, the University of Dijon, (France), Ecole Superieure de Chimie Industrielle de Lyon (ESCIL)(France) and Université Louis Pasteur (Strasbourg, France)

He has published over 600 research papers, the majority of which are on topics related to porphyrins, phthalocyanines, corroles and related macrocycles, while also editing more than 95 books on these topics and directing a research group, which, in total, has numbered over 125 different graduate students and postdoctoral associates. He is the founder and first president of the Fullerenes Division of the Electrochemical Society and since 1994 has organized or co-organized more than 25 symposia on the topic of fullerenes and carbon nanomaterials. He was a co-organizer of the first (2000), third (2004), sixth (2010), ninth (2016) and eleventh (2020) International Conference on Porphyrins and Phthalocyanines. Dr. Kadish is editor-in-chief of the Journal of Porphyrins and Phthalocyanines and also serves as president of the Society of Porphyrins and Phthalocyanines (SPP), a position he has held continuously since June 2000.

== Awards and honors ==
- Fulbright scholar, Université Louis Pasteur, Strasbourg, France, 1980–1981.
- American Chemical Society, Southeastern Texas Section Award, 1987.
- Sigma Xi Faculty Research Award, University of Houston Chapter, 1988.
- Commended and awarded recognition by the mayor and City Council of Houston for continued academic accomplishments and leadership at the University of Houston, 1990, 1991 and 1993.
- University of Houston Research Excellence Award, 1991.
- Japan Society for the Promotion of Science fellowship, 1994.
- Elected a fellow of the Electrochemical Society, 1995.
- Awarded Docteur Honoris Causa, University of Burgundy, France 2003.
- Hans Fischer Lifetime Award in Porphyrin Chemistry, 2012.
- Prix Franco Américain, 2017

== Editorial boards and offices ==
- North American editor, Journal of Porphyrins and Phthalocyanines, 1997–2001
- Editor-in-chief, Journal of Porphyrins and Phthalocyanines, 2001–present
- Chairman of Fullerenes Group of the Electrochemical Society, 1996–2000
- President, Society of Porphyrins and Phthalocyanines (SPP), 2000–present
