= National Entrance Screening Test =

Entrance test for Integrated-MSc admissions in India

- Acronym: NEST
- Type: Computer Based Test
- Administrator: National Institute of Science Education and Research
- Skills tested: Academic knowledge
- Purpose: Admission to Integrated-MSc Program
- Year started: 2007 (19 years ago)
- Duration: 3 hours
- Score range: 200
- Score validity: 1 year
- Offered: Once in a year
- Restrictions on attempts: No restriction on the number of attempts, There is no age limit for appearing.
- Regions: India
- Languages: English
- Annual number of test takers: ▼27,973 (2024); ▲44,920 (2023); ▼22,000 (2022); ▲24,328 (2021); ▼21,275 (2020)
- Prerequisites: Physics; Chemistry; Mathematics; Biology
- Fee: ₹1400 for male applicants of the General and OBC categories.; ₹700 for all female applicants and male applicants of SC, ST, Divyangjan.
- Used by: 2 institutes
- Website: www.nestexam.in

The National Entrance Screening Test (NEST) is an annual college entrance examination in India, conducted for admission into the National Institute of Science Education and Research (NISER), Jatani and the Centre for Excellence in Basic Sciences (UM-DAE CEBS), Mumbai. These two institutes use NEST as a sole criterion for admission to their undergraduate programs.

2017 was the year in which NEST exam received highest number of applicants ( 68,544 ) and students appeared ( approx. 47000 ). The number of test takers appearing for the exam started declining in the first following years as in 2018 - 44060 students appeared then in 2019 - 37510; 2020 - 21275.The number of test takers saw increases in 2021 and 2023 but has otherwise fluctuated around the same level . (official annual reports published by NISER on its official website). For about approx.100 Unreserved seats out of 202 in NISER, one can get admission with general ranks upto 400-700 (cutoffs vary with year).

Students were also admitted through the NEST examination at ISERC, Visva-Bharati(which is an Institution of National Importance) until 2023.

== Pattern of the test ==
Before 2024, the question paper pattern of NEST was different. From 2024 onwards, the paper consists of four sections: Physics, Chemistry, Mathematics, and Biology. Each section contains 20 MCQs with a single correct answer, making a total of 80 questions (20 × 4).

Each correct answer carries +3 marks, each incorrect answer carries −1 mark, and unanswered questions receive 0 marks. The total marks for the paper are 240 (80 × 3). However, the merit list is prepared out of 180 marks based on the best three sections. This means you can choose to skip one section based on your preference.

The difficulty level of NEST is often compared to JEE Main, but this comparison is not entirely accurate. It is also nowhere close to the level of JEE Advanced, despite claims made by some NEST coaching institutes.

The cutoff varies each year, but aiming for 90–100 marks out of 180 is generally considered a safe target for selection.

== Seats and intake ==
The number of students taking the examination has been increasing since it was first conducted in 2007. In 2020 200+2 seats were for NISER and 45+2 seats for UM-DAE CBS. About 21,275 students appeared in the exam. Upto 2024, the exam was conducted in two sittings, 9:00 hrs to 12:30 hrs and 14:30 hrs to 18:00 hrs. From 2025 it is conducted in a single shift from 9:00 hrs to 12:30 hrs in 2025 and 14:00 hrs to 17:00 hrs in 2026

The availability of seats in recent years is as given in table below:

Institute	Intake (2007)	Intake (2008)	Intake (2009)	Intake (2010)	Intake (2011)	Intake (2012)	Intake (2013)	Intake (2014)	Intake (2020)	Intake (2021)
National Institute of Science Education and Research (NISER)	40	40	52	60	60	60	60	100	202	202
Centre for Excellence in Basic Sciences (UM-DAE CBS)	20	12	35	35	35	35	35	35	59	59

== See also ==
- National Institute of Science Education and Research, Jatani
