= Automatic enrolment =

In public services, automatic enrolment defines programmes where citizens are automatically included unless they opt out.

== Examples ==
There are various examples of automatic enrolment schemes in public services across the world. Examples of the use of automatic enrolment schemes in the public sector include in the enrolment of citizens into pension schemes and organ donation programmes.

=== Pensions ===
- Italy have an automatic enrolment programme as of 2007.
- New Zealand as of 2007.
- The United Kingdom as of 2012.
- Turkey as of 2017.
- Lithuania as of 2019.
- Poland as of 2019.
- Ireland are commencing an auto enrolment system on 1 January 2026 - see Auto-enrolment in the Republic of Ireland

==== United Kingdom ====
Automatic enrolment was introduced in the United Kingdom in 2012. The scheme initially covered all UK citizens in work aged between 22 and the state pension age who earned more than £8,105 a year (this amount rose to £10,000 in 2015), as well as all those not already enrolled in a workplace pension scheme. The UK's Pensions Regulator hailed the success of auto-enrolment in 2019, with figures showing that 10 million more workers were now enrolled and saving into their pensions than in 2012.

There has been widespread calls from within the pensions industry for the UK Government to increase the contribution level at which workers are automatically enrolled. It has been questioned as to whether the current rate of 8% is large enough to provide a healthy retirement income. Industry figures often call for the contribution rate to be scaled up to above 12% but some have even called for it to go as high as 16%. However, there are some who question how this would affect the incomes of those on lower salaries.

=== Organ donation ===
- Organ donation in some countries such as Austria

== Benefits and drawbacks ==
Automatic enrolment is recommended in the book Nudge by Thaler and Sunstein, as it promotes higher participation rates than when citizens are left to arrange their own pensions.
