= Journal of Porphyrins and Phthalocyanines =

Scientific journal

- Discipline: Chemistry
- Language: English
- Edited by: Karl M. Kadish

Publication details
- History: 1997 - present
- Publisher: World Scientific (Singapore)
- Impact factor: 1.816 (2019)

Standard abbreviations
- ISO 4: J. Porphyr. Phthalocyanines

Indexing
- ISSN: 1088-4246 (print); 1099-1409 (web)

Links
- Journal homepage

The Journal of Porphyrins and Phthalocyanines (JPP) is a scientific journal that covers developments in the research and technology of porphyrins and phthalocyanines.

JPP was founded in 1997 and is published by World Scientific. The current editor-in-chief is Karl M. Kadish, a professor emeritus at the University of Houston.

Journal Citation Reports assigned JPP an impact factor of 1.816 in 2019.

== Society of Porphyrins & Phthalocyanines ==
The Society of Porphyrins and Phthalocyanines (SPP) was formed in June 2000 by an interdisciplinary group of scientists involved with the synthesis, spectroscopy, processing, and applications of these compounds. SPP purchased JPP from John Wiley & Son in 2001, and handled all aspects of the journal's publication before entering into a joint publication venture with World Scientific in 2009.

SPP organizes the International Conference of Porphyrins and Phthalocyanines (ICPP), held biennially in various parts of the world. The 2024 conference, ICPP-13, will be held in Niagara Falls, New York.
