= PERS =

PERS may refer to:

- Personal Emergency Response System
- The Oregon Public Employees Retirement System or another similarly named program. See Public employee pension plans in the United States.
