= List of largest pension schemes in the United States =

This list of largest pension funds in the United States involves two main groups: government pension funds for public employees and collectively bargained pension funds, jointly managed between employer and employee representatives after the Taft-Hartley Act of 1947. In practice, Taft-Hartley plans have many units of local pension funds, under an umbrella group.

== Largest U.S. public pension funds ==
The rankings below are the 30 largest public pension plans in the U.S., according to the 2018 list compiled by Pensions & Investments. Because this information is now several years old, the numbers and rankings may no longer be entirely accurate.

Rank	Plan	Total Assets (millions)	DB Assets (millions)	Funded Status FYE 2016	Assumed Rate of Return FYE 2016
1	CalPERS	$336,684	$335,083	73.1%	7.5%
2	CalSTRS	$216,193	$215,318	68.5%	7.6%
3	New York State Common Retirement	$201,263	$201,263	93.7%	7.0%
4	New York City Retirement	$189,794	$189,794	N/A	N/A
5	Florida SBA	$167,900	$157,562	85.4%	7.7%
6	Teacher Retirement System of Texas	$146,326	$146,326	79.7%	8.0%
7	New York State Teachers	$115,637	$115,637	94.2%	7.5%
8	State of Wisconsin Investment Board	$109,960	$105,155	N/A	N/A
9	North Carolina Retirement Systems	$106,946	$96,094	88.3%	7.3%
10	Washington State Investment Board	$104,260	$86,615	85.5%	7.7%
11	Ohio Public Employees Retirement System	$97,713	$96,304	80.2%	7.5%
12	New Jersey Division of Investment	$80,486	$76,361	N/A	N/A
13	Virginia Retirement System	$79,238	$76,023	73.3%	7.0%
14	Oregon PERS	$77,495	$75,454	78.7%	7.5%
15	STRS Ohio	$76,458	$75,148	69.6%	7.8%
16	Michigan ORS	$75,550	$67,496	61.4%	7.2%
17	Teachers Retirement System of Georgia	$73,089	$73,089	79.1%	7.5%
18	Minnesota State Board of Investment	$72,672	$64,116	72.6%	7.8%
19	Massachusetts PRIM	$69,496	$69,496	N/A	N/A
20	Tennessee Consolidated Retirement System	$55,112	$48,330	95.9%	7.5%
21	Los Angeles County	$53,832	$53,832	83.3%	7.5%
22	Pennsylvania Public Schools	$52,891	$52,891	81.2%	7.5%
23	Colorado PERA	$51,476	$47,300	58.1%	7.5%
24	Maryland SRPS	$50,297	$50,297	72.7%	7.6%
25	Illinois Teachers	$49,863	$49,863	39.8%	7.5%
26	Missouri PSRS	$42,307	$42,307	85.0%	7.8%
27	Illinois Municipal Retirement Fund	$39,811	$39,811	88.9%	7.5%
28	Nevada PERS	$39,721	$39,721	74.1%	8.0%
29	Alabama Retirement	$38,800	$36,686	N/A	N/A
30	South Carolina PEBA	$37,263	$31,057	62.0%	7.5%

== See also ==
- Pension fund
- US labor law
- Individual Retirement Account
- Congressional pension
