= Seth Metcalf =

Financial executive and former Ohio Treasury official

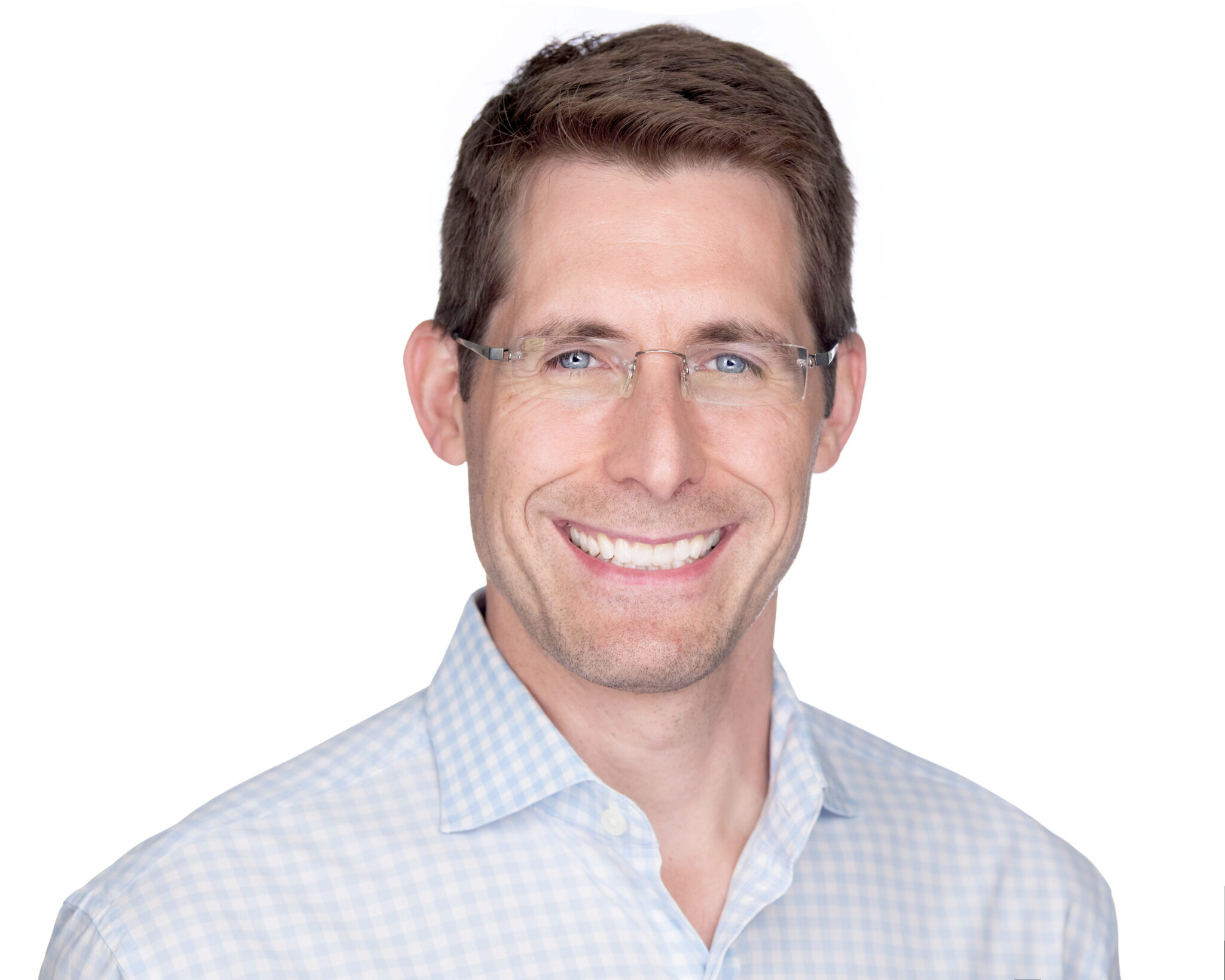

Deputy Treasurer of Ohio
- In office 2011–2017
- Appointed by: Josh Mandel
- Governor: John Kasich

Personal details
- Education: Ohio State University (BA); Cornell University (JD)

James Seth Metcalf is an American attorney, chief financial officer, insurance executive, and former public official who served as deputy treasurer of Ohio from 2011 to 2017 during the tenure of Treasurer Josh Mandel. He subsequently served as an appointed investment expert and trustee for the Ohio Public Employee Retirement System, one of the largest pension funds in the United States.

Following graduation from Cornell Law School in 2004, Metcalf practiced law in the areas of mergers & acquisitions, corporate restructuring, taxation, bonds, and public finance as an associate at Squire Patton Boggs.

During his tenure at the Ohio Treasury, Metcalf implemented programs focused on reducing financing costs for state and local government, improving savings and investment programs for individuals with disabilities, as well as promoting transparency with a searchable database of government expenditures.

He returned to the private sector in 2017 to become chief financial officer of Bold Penguin, an insurance and financial technology company.

== Education and early career ==
In 2001, Metcalf graduated from Ohio State University with a Bachelor of Arts, cum laude, in political science. He subsequently attended Cornell Law School, graduating with a JD in 2004. While a law student, he joined the Cornell Journal of Law and Public Policy, where he was a note editor.

Following graduation from law school, Metcalf joined the international law firm Squire, Sanders & Dempsey (now Squire Patton Boggs) where he was an associate in the tax and financial practice areas until his selection as deputy treasurer.

== Government service ==
In 2011, Metcalf was appointed by Ohio Treasurer Josh Mandel to serve as deputy treasurer and executive counsel. In this role, Metcalf developed and implemented several public finance initiatives. These efforts frequently used technology to improve efficiency and transparency for state financial transactions.

Metcalf oversaw the launch of Ohio’s Market Access Program, which created a marketplace for municipalities to issue bonds, lowering interest expenses for public debt in Ohio. Metcalf was recognized for the program's implementation with an award from The Bond Buyer, a trade newspaper specializing in analysis of the bond industry.

A major initiative during Metcalf's tenure was OhioCheckbook.gov, a government spending transparency platform. Prior to Metcalf and Mandel beginning their terms at the Treasury, the state of Ohio had been ranked near the bottom in financial transparency. They launched Ohio Checkbook in large part to address these issues by creating an improved searchable database to report expenditures across Ohio’s state and local government, allowing citizens to track spending and search entries across multiple categories. This program was credited with raising Ohio’s transparency ranking from 46th to 1st in the United States as assessed by the Public Interest Research Group.

In June 2016, Ohio launched a program called STABLE Accounts, which allowed Ohioans with disabilities to invest without losing eligibility for public benefit programs like Medicaid and Social Security Disability Insurance. This made Ohio the first state with a program to allow its residents to benefit from tax-advantaged savings pursuant to the ABLE Act.

=== Retirement system trustee ===
After concluding his tenure in the Treasury in 2017, Metcalf was appointed as an investment expert to the board of trustees of the Ohio Public Employees Retirement System, one of the largest pension systems in the United States. He also served as a trustee for Ohio’s Deferred Compensation Plan, an optional retirement supplement for Ohio public employees.

== Private sector ==
Since returning to the private sector, Metcalf has served as an executive for companies in the financial sector.

In 2017, Metcalf joined the fintech company Bold Penguin as chief financial officer. The company functions as an insurance portal, creating an online marketplace to streamline commercial property & casualty insurance. In 2021, Bold Penguin was acquired by American Family Insurance for an undisclosed sum.

In 2021, he became the chief operating officer of SoLo Funds, a Los Angeles-based consumer finance marketplace. He had served as an advisor to the company since 2017.

=== OH.io litigation ===
In August 2025, Metcalf became the General Partner of Global Operations at OH.io, a company founded by Ratmir Timashev to help grow AI startups. He was hired around the same time as Jeff Schumann and Kevin Colón. On 13 April 2026, all three were fired within nine hours of each other. The day after they were fired, Metcalf, Schumann, and Colón filed a complaint against OH.io in the Franklin County Court of Common Pleas for breach of contract, claiming they were unjustly fired.

On 11 May, Timashev countersued in the United States District Court for the Southern District of Ohio, claiming an investigation found Colón, Schumann, and Metcalf were mismanaging company funds, and that 23 minutes after Schumann was fired, Metcalf factory-reset Schumann's work computer, erasing company information. Timashev also sued the three in a Connecticut state court for violating his privacy rights by recording internal company meetings. All lawsuits are currently unresolved.
