= Death and state funeral of Lee Kuan Yew =

Death and state funeral of the Prime Minister of Singapore

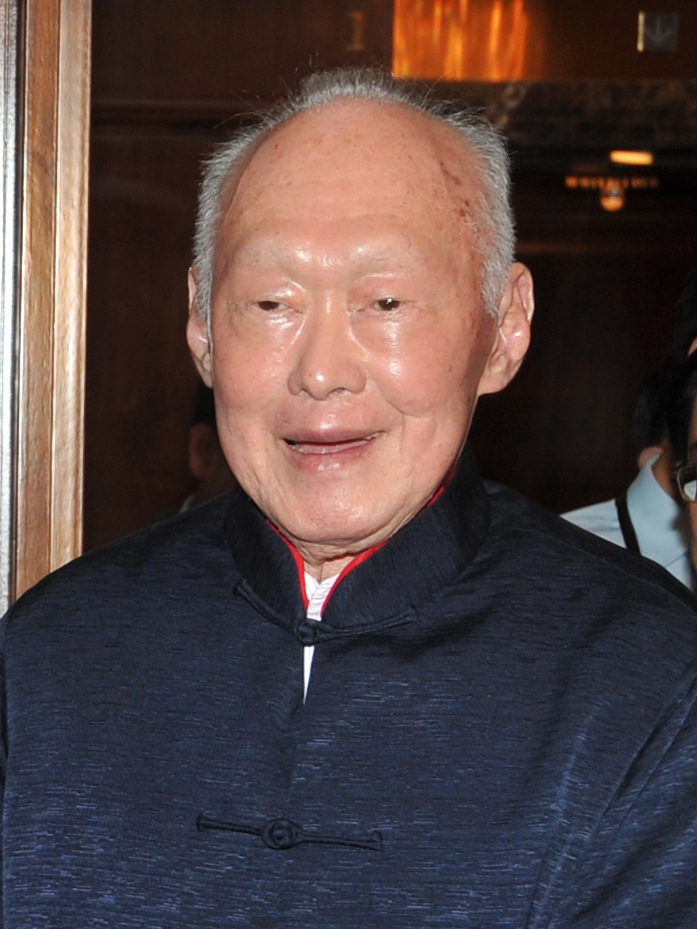
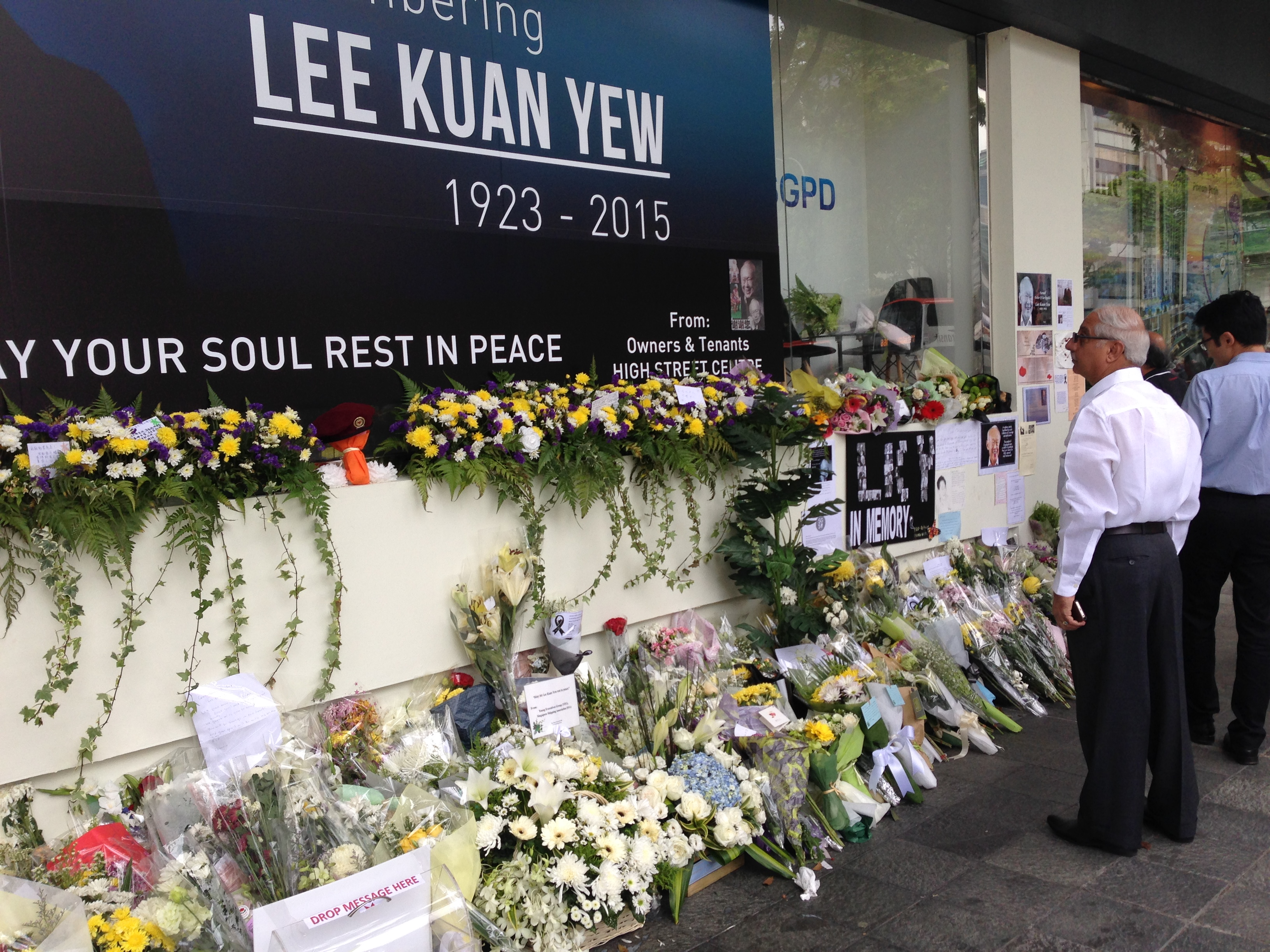
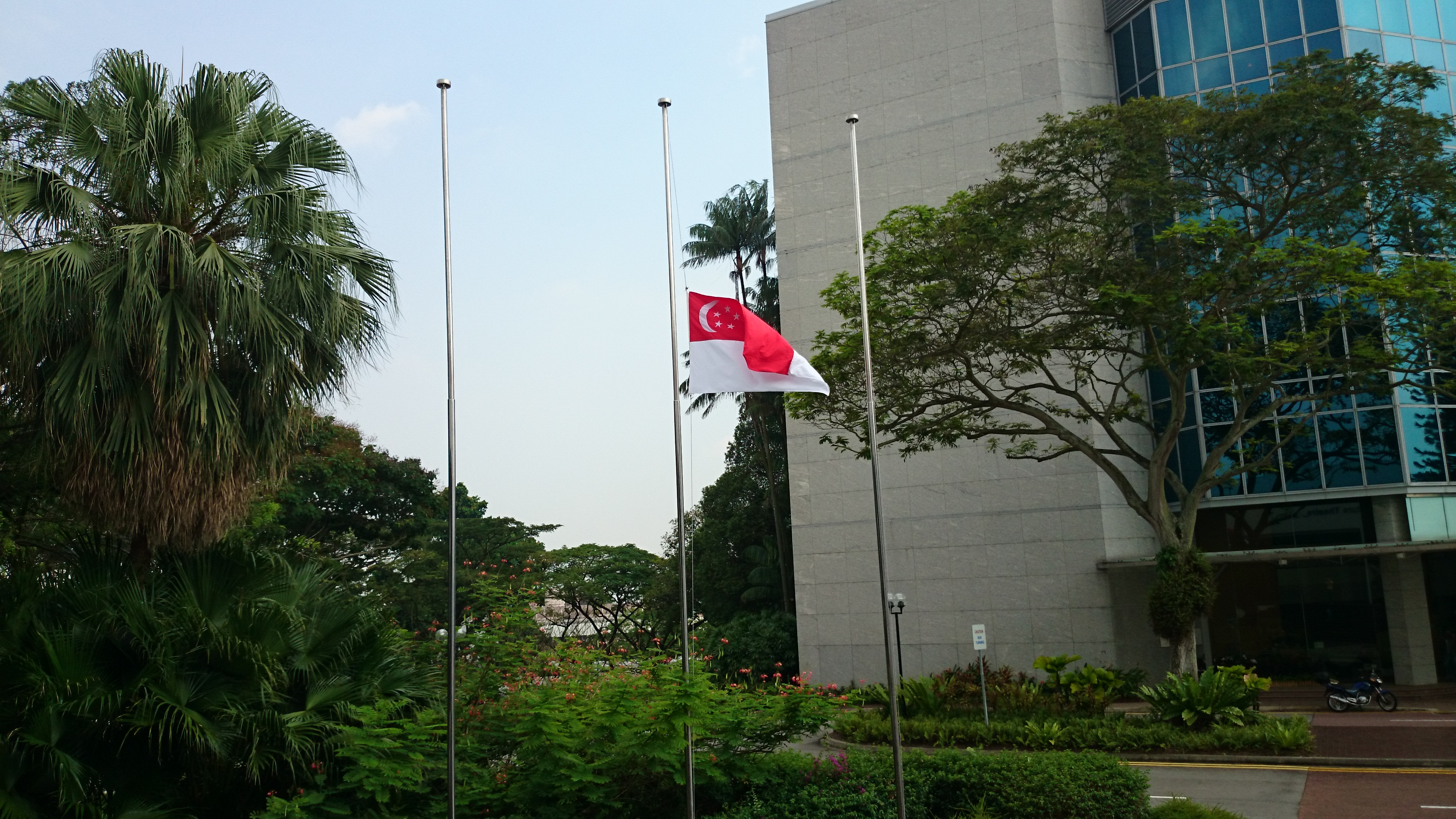
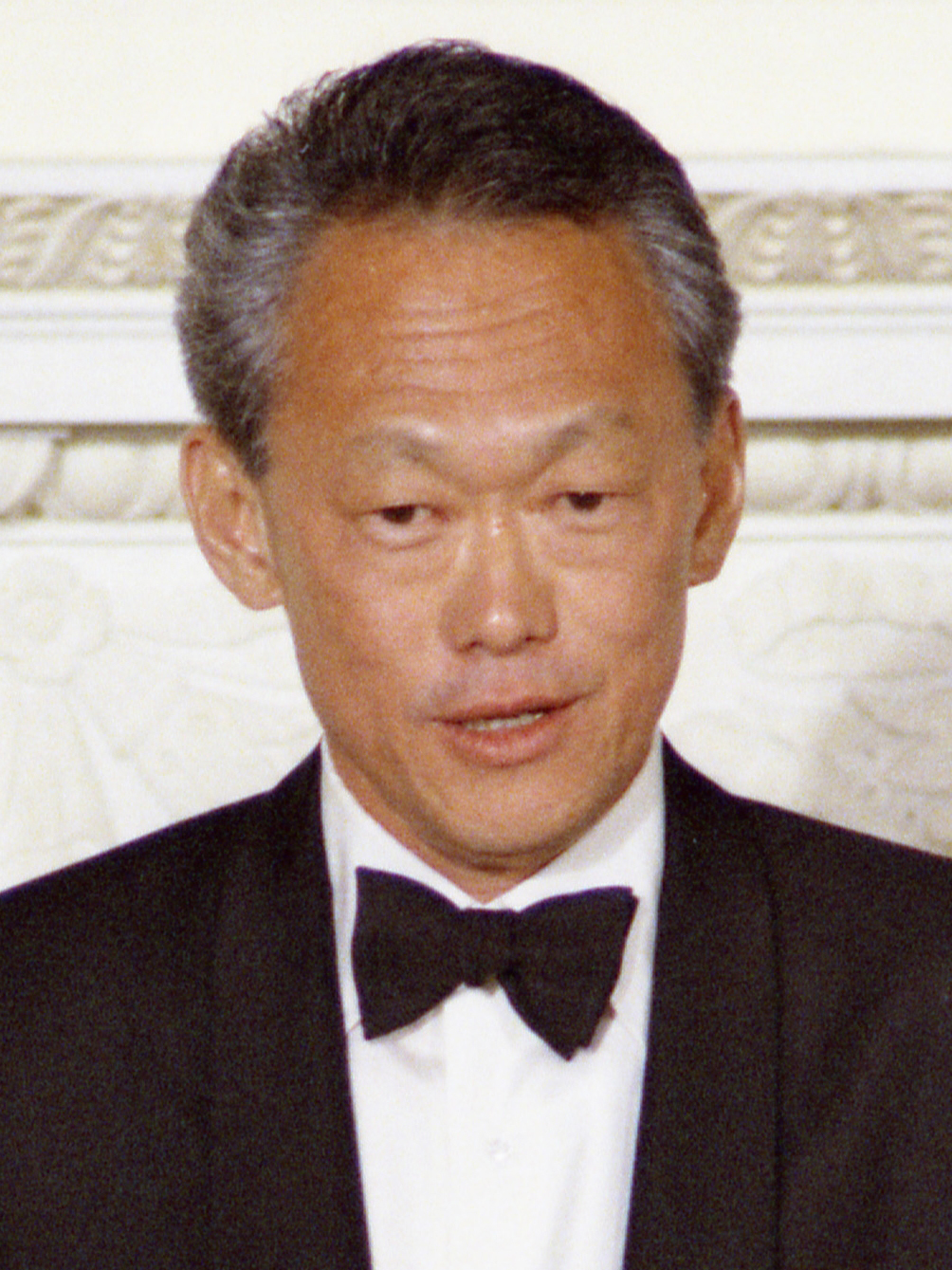
- Clockwise from top left: Lee Kuan Yew in November 2011, floral tributes of Kuan Yew outside High Street Centre opposite of Singapore's Parliament House, Lee Kuan Yew at the White House in 1975, and the Flag of Singapore at half-mast shortly after his death.
- Date: 23–29 March 2015
- Venue: Sri Temasek (private wake); Parliament House (lying in state); University Cultural Centre (state funeral); Mandai Crematorium and Columbarium (cremation)
- Location: Singapore General Hospital (place of death); 1°16′43.32″N 103°50′3.84″E

On 23 March 2015, Lee Kuan Yew, the founding prime minister of Singapore and co-founder of the People's Action Party, died at the age of 91 at 03:18 Singapore Standard Time (UTC+08:00), after having been hospitalised at the Singapore General Hospital with severe pneumonia since 5 February that year. A formal announcement was made on national television and radio by Prime Minister Lee Hsien Loong at 08:00 that morning.

Many world leaders, governments, international organisations, and individuals issued public condolences. A week-long period of national mourning was declared by the government, from 23 to 29 March 2015. All flags, including the National Flag, in Singapore were flown at half-mast during the period. Lee was subsequently cremated at Mandai Crematorium and Columbarium on 29 March.

== Timeline ==
All times are set out in Singapore Standard Time (UTC+08:00).

=== Death of Lee Kuan Yew on 23 March 2015 ===
- 03:18: Singapore's founding prime minister Lee Kuan Yew died at the Singapore General Hospital.
- 04:07: Prime Minister's Office issued a statement acknowledging Lee Kuan Yew's death. Simultaneously, the statement was published via its official Facebook page.
- 04:11: The statement was first read via Channel NewsAsia, effectively suspending all Mediacorp's regular programming.
- 06:30: Prime Minister Lee Hsien Loong and also eldest son of Lee Kuan Yew declared a seven-day period of national mourning.
- 08:00: The Prime Minister made a statement in Malay, Mandarin and English formally announcing the death. All radio and television stations carried the address "live".

=== Private wake ===
On 23 March 2015 at 13:00, Lee's body was brought to the Istana, the official residence of the president of Singapore and the office of the prime minister. It was placed in Sri Temasek, the Prime Minister's official residence in the Istana grounds, where a private wake was held from 23 to 25 March 2015.

=== Mourning ===
The government declared a weeklong mourning period from 23 to 29 March 2015 for Lee Kuan Yew. Flags were lowered to half-mast as a mark of respect. Most events and activities were scaled down, postponed or cancelled completely throughout the mourning period. Entertainment outlets, such as cinemas, theatres, nightclubs and bars announced that they would be closed or operate under reduced hours during this period.

Upon the announcement of his death, all free-to-air television channels and radio stations suspended their regular programming and simulcast special programmes from broadcasters Mediacorp and SPH Media, which consisted of a montage of videos and photos of Lee Kuan Yew's life, accompanied by coverage of live events from the Istana, Parliament House and the state funeral procession. Some pay-TV channels were blacked out and replaced by this programming too. Most Singaporean and some international websites switched to greyscale colour schemes as well.

18 community tribute sites were set up islandwide during the mourning period, to allow citizens and residents to pay tribute to the late prime minister. Each community tribute site consisted of wreaths from various citizens and organisations, as well as a projection screen showing montages of Lee Kuan Yew's life. Memorial ceremonies were held during certain evenings as well.

Singapore Turf Club announced they would cancel all the race meetings during the period of National Mourning.

=== Lying in state ===
A sign at Bras Basah MRT station indicating that Mass Rapid Transit trains would run throughout the night on 25–26 March 2015 to enable people to pay their last respects to the late prime minister as he lay in state at Parliament House, Singapore

The body of Lee Kuan Yew was conveyed by gun carriage from the Istana to the Parliament House on the morning of 25 March 2015. After leaving Sri Temasek, the gun carriage paused in front of the main Istana building to allow President Tony Tan Keng Yam, his wife Mrs. Mary Tan, emeritus senior minister and former prime minister Goh Chok Tong, and Istana staff to pay their respects. During this time, a piper from the Gurkha Contingent of the Singapore Police Force played "Auld Lang Syne" from the roof of the building. The cortege then made its way down Bras Basah Road and North Bridge Road, which were lined with members of the public, to Parliament House.

Lee's body lay in state at Parliament House from 25 March 2015 to 28 March 2015, which was subsequently opened 24 hours for the public to pay their respects. To facilitate this, Mass Rapid Transit services, Light Rail Transit services, and selected bus services ran for 24 hours on 25 and 27 March and throughout the early hours of the morning of 26 March 2015 and 28 March 2015. The Land Transport Authority announced that public transport services would end later than usual after midnight on 27 March 2015, but would not run throughout the night due to essential maintenance works.

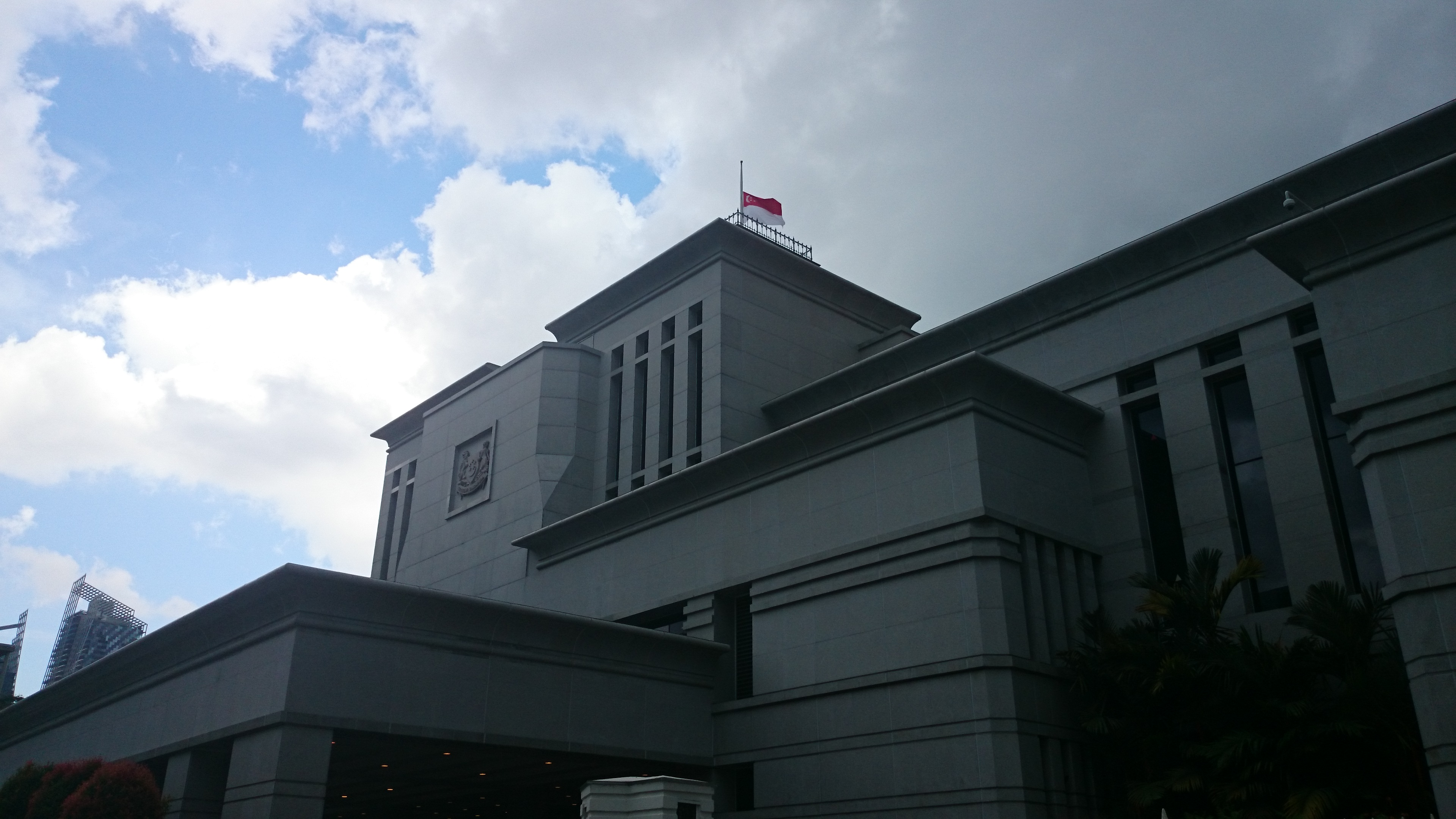
State Flag flying at half-mast on Parliament House

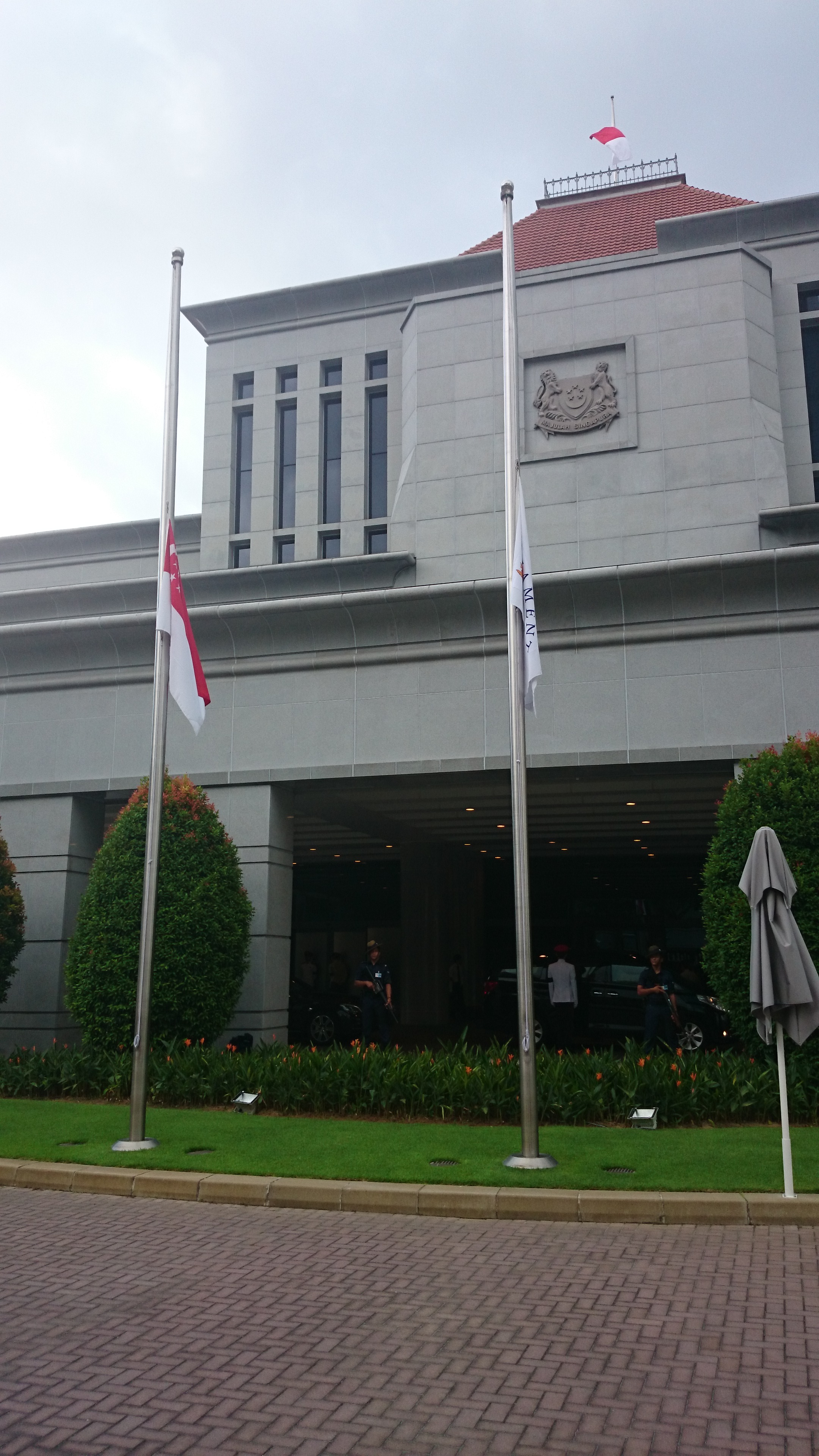
State and Government Flags flying at half-mast at Parliament House

=== Special parliamentary session ===
On 26 March 2015 at 16:00, a special parliamentary session was held for Members of Parliament to pay tribute to Lee Kuan Yew. They included:

- Ng Eng Hen (PAP – Bishan–Toa Payoh), minister for defence and Leader of the House
- Seng Han Thong (PAP – Ang Mo Kio)
- Low Thia Khiang (WP – Aljunied)
- Wong Kan Seng (PAP – Bishan–Toa Payoh)
- Thomas Chua Kee Seng (NMP)
- Masagos Zulkifli (PAP – Tampines), Minister for Environment and Water Resources
- Vikram Nair (PAP – Sembawang)
- Sim Ann (PAP – Holland–Bukit Timah), Minister of State, Ministry of Education and Ministry of Communications and Information
- Chia Yong Yong (NMP)
- Christopher de Souza (PAP – Holland-Bukit Timah)
- Indranee Rajah (PAP – Tanjong Pagar), Senior Minister of State, Ministry of Law and Ministry of Education

=== State and private funerals ===
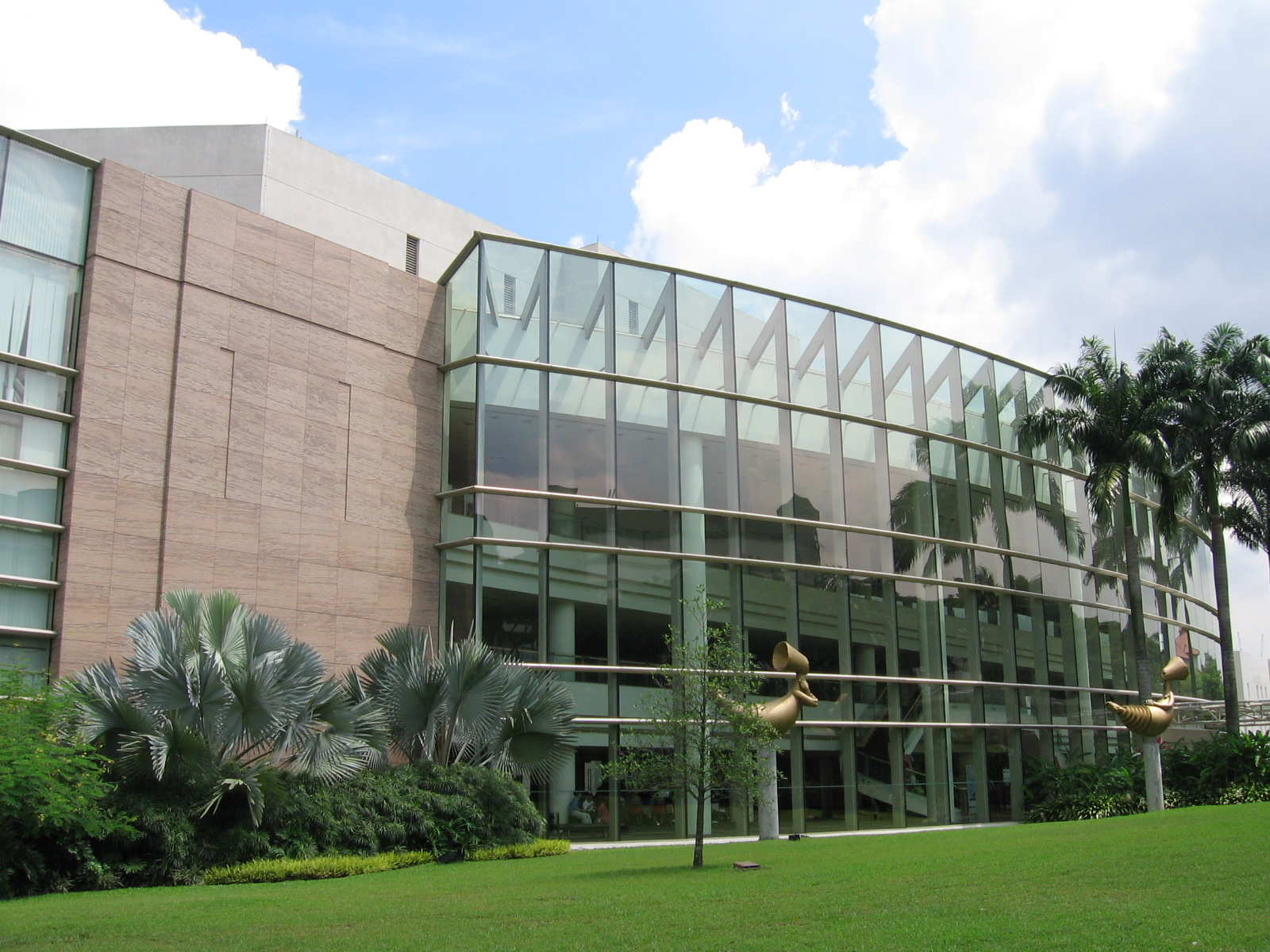
University Cultural Centre

Lee's state and private funeral services was held on Sunday, 29 March 2015. 87 bus services were either diverted, shortened or suspended from 11:30 to 19:00 to facilitate the road closures. The SCDF Public Warning System siren was sounded twice islandwide at 16:35 to signal the start and end of a minute of silence in honour of Mr Lee. Prior to the minute of silence, all MRT trains stopped at stations and opened their doors. Similarly, buses scheduled to depart from bus interchanges or terminals were held back during the one minute of silence. Passenger Information Displays in the MRT network and bus interchanges showed "One minute of silence for Mr Lee Kuan Yew". Announcements were also made at stations and on-board trains.

The state funeral was held at the University Cultural Centre, National University of Singapore, from 14:00. It was attended by members of Lee's family, the president, cabinet ministers, members of the Judiciary, Members of Parliament, and foreign leaders. Ordinary Singaporeans from all walks of life have also been invited to attend. The master of ceremonies was Peter Ong, head of the Civil Service. Ten eulogies were delivered, in the following order:

- Prime Minister Lee Hsien Loong
- Former president Dr Tony Tan Keng Yam
- Emeritus senior minister and former prime minister Goh Chok Tong
- Former cabinet minister Ong Pang Boon
- Former cabinet minister S. Dhanabalan
- Former senior minister of state Sidek bin Saniff
- Trade unionist G. Muthukumarasamy
- Tanjong Pagar community leader Leong Chun Loong
- Former journalist Cassandra Chew
- The younger son Lee Hsien Yang

The state funeral was followed by a private funeral at 5:00 pm at Mandai Crematorium for invited guests.

On 27 March 2015, Singapore's defence minister Ng Eng Hen mentioned in a Facebook post that the Singapore Armed Forces will accord Mr Lee due military honours. On the day of the state funeral, a 21-gun salute was fired by four ceremonial 25-pounder guns as the procession headed to University Cultural Centre. In addition, four Republic of Singapore Air Force black knights made a fly pass salute. The originally planned missing man formation was not flown due to rainy weather. As his body passed Esplanade Bridge, both RSS Dauntless and RSS Resilience conducted a ceremonial sailpast.

The 21-gun salute honour is traditionally only accorded to the heads of state. As Lee Kuan Yew was only a former head of government, he would typically only be entitled to a 19-gun salute. Special permission was given for the 21-gun salute to honour him.

=== Notable mourners ===
Notable mourners at the private wake at Sri Temasek:

Country	Title	Name
Brunei	Sultan of Brunei	Hassanal Bolkiah
Hong Kong	Hong Kong business magnate	Li Ka-shing
Hong Kong	Hong Kong businessman	Richard Li
Hong Kong	Hong Kong businessman	Victor Li
Republic of China (Taiwan)	President of the Republic of China	Ma Ying-jeou
Republic of China (Taiwan)	Former president of Control Yuan	Fredrick Chien
Australia	Australian businesswomen	Gina Rinehart

Foreign dignitaries who paid their respects at Parliament House:

Country	Title	Dignitary
Afghanistan	Deputy Foreign Minister of Afghanistan	Hekmat Karzai
Bahrain	Son of Crown Prince of Bahrain	Isa bin Salman bin Hamad Al Khalifa
Bhutan	King of Bhutan	Jigme Khesar Namgyel Wangchuck
Bhutan	Queen of Bhutan	Jetsun Pema
China	Executive Chairman of Alibaba Group	Jack Ma
China	Vice-President of the People's Republic of China, member of the Politburo of the Chinese Communist Party	Li Yuanchao
Indonesia	Spouse of former president of Indonesia	Ani Yudhoyono
Indonesia	Former co-ordinating Minister for Economics in the Indonesia cabinet	Chairul Tanjung
Indonesia	Former Indonesian Ambassador to the United States	Dino Patti Djalal
Indonesia	Former Foreign Minister of Indonesia	Hassan Wirajuda
Indonesia	5th president of Indonesia	Megawati Sukarnoputri
Indonesia	Former Indonesia presidential candidate	Prabowo Subianto
Indonesia	Vice-chairman of the People's Consultative Assembly of Indonesia	Sapta Odang
Indonesia	6th president of Indonesia	Susilo Bambang Yudhoyono
Indonesia	Chairman of the People's Consultative Assembly of Indonesia	Zulkifli Hasan
Israel	President of Israel	Reuven Rivlin
Malaysia	Malaysia Minister of Foreign Affairs	Anifah Aman
Malaysia	Former Malaysia Finance Minister	Daim Zainuddin
Malaysia	Malaysia Natural Resources and Environment Minister	G. Palanivel
Malaysia	Malaysia Minister for Transport	Liow Tiong Lai
Malaysia	Prime Minister of Malaysia	Najib Razak
Malaysia	Raja Permaisuri Johor	Raja Zarith Sofia
Malaysia	Spouse of the Prime Minister of Malaysia	Rosmah Mansor
Malaysia	Sultan of Johor	Sultan Ibrahim Ismail
Maldives	Former president of the Maldives	Maumoon Abdul Gayoom
Mongolia	Foreign Minister of Mongolia	Lundeg Purevsuren
Oman	Secretary General of the Ministry of Foreign Affairs of Oman	Badr bin Hamad Al Busaidi
Sri Lanka	Foreign Minister of Sri Lanka	Mangala Samaraweera
Republic of China (Taiwan)	Former ROC premier, former senior advisor to the president of the ROC	Hau Pei-tsun
Timor-Leste	Former president of East Timor	José Ramos-Horta
United Arab Emirates	Member of the ruling Al Nahyan family of Abu Dhabi	Sheikh Hamed bin Zayed Al Nahyan
United States	Former president of the United States	Bill Clinton
United States	Former United States Secretary of State	Henry Kissinger
United States	Former Assistant to President for National Security Affairs	Thomas Donilon
United States	Former US Ambassador to Singapore	Steven J. Green
Vietnam	Secretary General of the Association of Southeast Asian Nations	Lê Lương Minh

Foreign dignitaries who represented their countries at Lee's state funeral at the University Cultural Centre, NUS, on 29 March 2015:

Country	Title	Dignitary
Australia	Prime Minister of Australia	Tony Abbott
Bangladesh	Minister of Foreign Affairs (Bangladesh)	Abul Hassan Mahmud Ali
Bhutan	King of Bhutan	Jigme Khesar Namgyel Wangchuck
Bhutan	Queen of Bhutan	Jetsun Pema
Brunei	Sultan of Brunei	Hassanal Bolkiah
Cambodia	Prime Minister of Cambodia	Hun Sen
Canada	Governor General of Canada	David Johnston
China	Vice-President of the People's Republic of China, member of the Politburo of the Chinese Communist Party	Li Yuanchao
Hong Kong	Former chief executive of Hong Kong, representative of Chief Executive of Hong Kong and Hong Kong Government	Tung Chee-hwa
India	Prime Minister of India	Narendra Modi
Indonesia	President of Indonesia	Joko Widodo
Israel	President of Israel	Reuven Rivlin
Japan	Prime Minister of Japan	Shinzō Abe
Kazakhstan	Prime Minister of Kazakhstan	Karim Massimov
Laos	Prime Minister of Laos	Thongsing Thammavong
Malaysia	King of Malaysia	Abdul Halim
Myanmar (Burma)	President of Myanmar	Thein Sein
Nepal	Deputy Prime Minister of Nepal	Prakash Man Singh
New Zealand	Governor-General of New Zealand	Jerry Mateparae
Philippines	President of the Senate of the Philippines representing President Benigno Aquino III	Franklin Drilon
Philippines	Secretary of Foreign Affairs (Philippines)	Albert del Rosario
Philippines	Secretary of Finance (Philippines)	Cesar Purisima
Qatar	Emir Sheikh of Qatar	Tamim bin Hamad Al Thani
Russia	First Deputy Prime Minister of Russia	Igor Shuvalov
South Africa	Minister of Public Works (South Africa)	Thulas Nxesi
South Korea	President of South Korea	Park Geun-hye
Thailand	Prime Minister of Thailand	Prayut Chan-o-cha
Republic of China (Taiwan)	Former ROC Vice-President, former ROC premier	Lien Chan
Republic of China (Taiwan)	Former ROC vice-president, former ROC premier	Vincent Siew
Republic of China (Taiwan)	Former ROC premier, former senior advisor to the president of the ROC	Hau Pei-tsun
Republic of China (Taiwan)	Former ROC premier, former secretary-general of the ROC Presidential Office	Su Tseng-chang
United Kingdom	First Secretary of State and Leader of the House of Commons of United Kingdom	William Hague
United States	Former president of the United States, leading the Presidential Delegation representing President Barack Obama	Bill Clinton
United States	Former Secretary of State of United States & a close friend to Lee Kuan Yew	Henry Kissinger
United States	US Ambassador to Singapore	Kirk Wagar
United States	Former US Ambassador to Singapore	Steven J. Green
United States	Former Assistant to President for National Security Affairs	Thomas Donilon
Vietnam	Prime Minister of Vietnam	Nguyen Tan Dung

== Reactions ==
=== Singapore ===
Prior to the death of Lee Kuan Yew, when he was hospitalised at the Singapore General Hospital on 5 February, Singaporeans expressed concern for his health through social media websites. On 17 March 2015, the Prime Minister's office announced that Lee's condition has worsened due to an infection. Following that, many Singaporeans went to the hospital to pay tribute to Lee Kuan Yew, however as Lee was in the Intensive Care Unit, no visitors were allowed and the hospital could not accept gifts such as flowers and cards. On 20 March 2015, the Singapore General Hospital designated an area for well-wishers to leave cards and flowers for Lee Kuan Yew. Several Singaporeans and foreigners were seen leaving cards and flowers at the designated site. Additionally, the Tanjong Pagar Community Club set up a "get well corner" for residents to write messages and leave flowers and cards for Lee Kuan Yew.

After the death of Lee Kuan Yew was announced on 23 March 2015, an estimated 447,299 Singaporeans and non-Singaporeans went to the Parliament House of Singapore to pay their respects to Lee Kuan Yew. A tribute site was set up at the Istana, as well as other community clubs around the country for Singaporeans to pen their wishes for the late Lee Kuan Yew.

On 25 March 2015, as the private wake for friends and family of Lee Kuan Yew ended, a ceremonial gun carriage carried the body of Lee Kuan Yew from the Istana to Parliament House. Singaporeans lined up from the gates of parliament house to the Istana. Many in the crowd outside the Istana clapped and cheered Mr Lee Kuan Yew's name as his hearse drove past, while many wept for Lee. Members of the public were soon allowed inside parliament house to pay their respects to Lee Kuan Yew. A queue started to form from parliament house stretching to Hong Lim Park and Fort Canning Park. Authorities advised members of the public not to join the queue as the wait was estimated to be 8 hours.

- Lee Hsien Loong, the then Prime Minister of Singapore and son of Lee Kuan Yew, said "The first of our founding fathers is no more. He inspired us, gave us courage, kept us together, and brought us here. He fought for our independence, built a nation where there was none, and made us proud to be Singaporeans."
- Goh Chok Tong, the former prime minister of Singapore, said Lee Kuan Yew was the man he looked up to most and that Lee had "bequeathed a monumental legacy to Singaporeans—a safe, secure, harmonious and prosperous independent Singapore".
- Tony Tan, the then President of Singapore, sent his condolences to Lee's family saying "The greatest tribute that Singaporeans can pay him is to treasure and build upon the legacy that Lee and his team have left us, and make Singapore an even better home for our future generations."
- Low Thia Kiang, secretary-general for the Workers' Party of Singapore, said that Lee's "passing marks an end of an era in Singapore's history", and that "his contributions to Singapore will be remembered for generations to come".
- Nicole Seah, former second assistant secretary-general of the National Solidarity Party, said that Lee "left behind a nation that will miss [him]. Not out of fear, but [out] of love."
- Desmond Lim, Chairman of Singapore Democratic Alliance, said that Lee "had no doubt, with his comrades, had [sic] brought and push Singapore from third world country to what we enjoy now-first world state [sic]. This is something we had witnessed and cannot be denied.

=== Supranational organisations ===
- United Nations: Secretary-General of the United Nations Ban Ki-moon said that "As Singapore celebrates its 50th anniversary, he will be missed by many".
- International Monetary Fund: managing director Christine Lagarde "He was a visionary statesman whose uncompromising stand for meritocracy, efficiency and education transformed Singapore into one of the most prosperous nations in the world. His wisdom and leadership will be remembered by people all around the globe."
- World Bank: World Bank Group President Jim Yong Kim said that "The late Prime Minister was instrumental in the establishment of the Association of South-east Asian Nations" and that he "has left a lasting legacy not only for Singapore but also for Asean and he will be greatly missed".
- Association of South East Asian Nations: ASEAN Secretary General Le Luong Minh said that "The late Prime Minister is recognized around the world for transforming Singapore in a short time from an undeveloped nation to one of the most successful high-income countries in the world."
- Human Rights Watch: Phil Robertson, deputy director in Asia said that "Lee's tremendous role in Singapore's economic development is beyond doubt.

=== Governments ===
==== Africa ====
- Nigeria: Then-Nigerian president Goodluck Jonathan said in a statement praising the "achievements of Singapore under the leadership of Lee Kuan Yew have been a great source of inspiration over the years, join his compatriots and many admirers across the developing world in paying very well deserved tribute to the late Prime Minister who moved his country "from the third world to the first world" with immense wisdom, courage, resilience and perseverance".
- Rwanda: President Paul Kagame on Wednesday paid homage to Singapore's first leader: "Lee Kuan Yew was a remarkable leader for his people and the transformation he has led is envy to many."
- South Africa: The South African government released a statement -"South Africa mourns the death of a great Asian leader who spearheaded the transformation of Singapore from a tiny port city to the prosperous international financial, business, and transport hub that it is today."
- Tanzania: Then-President Jakaya Kikwete sent a message of condolence to the Prime Minister of Singapore. Kikwete called him a "nation builder" and said that he was admired by Tanzanians as a selfless leader.

==== Americas ====
- Canada: Then-Prime Minister Stephen Harper said that Lee "was a highly respected and accomplished leader who transformed Singapore from a developing country into a global leader in finance, shipping, education and technology. His memory will live on in the stability and prosperity of the peaceful and dynamic Southeast Asian nation to which he contributed so much of his life."
- Chile: A Chilean government spokesperson said that it "shares in the sorrow and mourning" of the loss of Lee Kuan Yew. The press release also acknowledged essential principles of governance between Singapore and Chile.
- Mexico: Mexican president Enrique Peña Nieto tweeted in Spanish "I regret the passing of the ex-Prime Minister of Singapore."
- Trinidad: Prime Minister Kamla Persad-Bissessar said "Mr Lee was the architect of the modern state of Singapore, which he transformed from a tiny developing country to a model nation of which all Singaporeans are proud."
- United States: Then-US president Barack Obama said he was "very saddened" and that Lee was "visionary". In a statement issued from the White House, he described Lee as "a true giant of history" and "... one of the great strategists of Asian affairs", and "A visionary who led his country from Singapore's independence in 1965 to build one of the most prosperous countries in the world today, he was a devoted public servant and a remarkable leader."
- Former president George H. W. Bush said "I will always be proud that Lee Kuan Yew was my friend. I respected his effective leadership of his wonderful, resilient and innovative country in ways that lifted living standards without indulging a culture of corruption. I was also proud of the progress Singapore and the United States achieved together as partners. Because of the example set by Lee Kuan Yew's singular leadership, let me add I am confident that the future will be bright for Singapore."
- Former president George W. Bush said that he was incredibly saddened by the loss of Lee Kuan Yew and sent his heartfelt condolences to the government and people of Singapore. He said that Lee "transformed his country and helped usher the ASEAN region into the modern era". He added that Lee left behind an "influential force for stability and prosperity and a friend to the United States".
- Former president Bill Clinton also offered his condolences. He wrote that "Lee transformed Singapore into one of the world's strongest and most sustainable economies. He also firmly established his country as an important friend and partner of the United States".
- Secretary of State John Kerry said in a message of condolences that "Lee Kuan Yew exuded wisdom ... The counsel ... with him—about life and politics and global affairs—is among the most valuable and insightful". Kerry added that Lee was a "uniquely astute analyst and observer of Asia, and it is largely through his life's work that Singapore became one of the United States' strongest strategic partners in the region".
- Former United States Secretaries of State, George Shultz, Colin Powell and Henry Kissinger offered condolences. Schultz said that Lee was "one of the most intelligent people I have ever known' and he often travelled to Singapore just to visit Lee Kuan Yew. In a separate statement, Kissinger wrote a tribute in The Washington Post stating that "Lee Kuan Yew was a great man. And he was a close personal friend, a fact that I consider one of the great blessings of my life. A world needing to distil order from incipient chaos will miss his leadership" Separately, Powell said that Lee "created a nation that is one of the most influential in the world that takes care of its people, one that ensures that it plays a major role on the world stage".
- Other prominent politicians who paid tributes to Lee Kuan Yew included Assistant Secretary of State for East Asian and Pacific Affairs. Daniel Russel, senators Bob Corker, John McCain, Jack Reed and Cory Gardner and Johnny Isakson.
- US flags at the embassy in Singapore and PSA Sembawang Wharves flew at half-mast during the period of national mourning.

==== Asia ====
- Afghanistan: President Ashraf Ghani hailed Lee Kuan Yew as an "inspirational leader" whose wisdom will "remain with us forever.
- Azerbaijan: Azerbaijani President Ilham Aliyev expressed his condolences in a letter written to Singapore President Tony Tan. Aliyev said that Lee was "an outstanding statesman" and news of his demise made him sad.
- Brunei: The sultan of Brunei Hassanal Bolkiah released a statement calling Lee a "... .charismatic and exemplary leader", whose "vast contributions towards maintaining regional peace and stability"
- Bhutan: The King of Bhutan Jigme Khesar Namgyel Wangchuck commanded the National Flag was flown at Half Mast in respect to Mr Lee Kuan Yew, Singapore's first prime minister. Ministers, Senior Government Officials, well-wishers, and Singaporeans residing in Bhutan participated in a ceremony to light a thousand butterlamps, and offered prayers for Mr Lee Kuan Yew, at the Kuenrey of the Tashichhodzong.
- Cambodia: Prime Minister Hun Sen said "Mr Lee Kuan Yew has been the father of modern Singapore since 1965. Under his guidance, Singapore has prospered and is famous throughout the world.
- China: President Xi Jinping described Lee as an old friend of China. Premier Li Keqiang sent condolences to Prime minister Lee Hsien Loong. Congress chairman Zhang Dejiang and Vice-premier Zhang Gaoli also send condolences to Singapore officers. China's Foreign Ministry described Lee as "... a politician who possessed unique influence on Asia. He was also a strategist with oriental values and international perspectives."
- Hong Kong: the chief executive, Leung Chun-ying said that "Mr Lee's integrity, tenacity, vision and drive laid the most solid foundation possible for the impressive economic development, prosperity and social harmony that epitomises Singapore today."
- India: Prime Minister of India Narendra Modi described Lee as a "... far-sighted statesman and a lion among leaders". India's government has also declared a day of national mourning on Sunday (29 Mar) as a mark of respect for the passing of Lee Kuan Yew. The national flag will be flown at half mast and there will be no official entertainment.
- Indonesia: President of Indonesia Joko Widodo tributed: "The government and people of Indonesia wish to convey their deep sorrow over the passing of former PM Lee Kuan Yew on Monday, 3.18am."
- Iran: President of Iran Hassan Rouhani offered his condolences and called Lee an "Inspiration leader" saying "Courage, leadership and his strength was an important factor in the independence of Singapore as a city-state and turn it into a major financial center in East and Southeast Asia. His services will never be forgotten ."
- Israel: Israeli president Reuven Rivlin offered his condolences and said that he has a "feeling of great respect for the people of Singapore" and that he was going to attend to the state funeral to express Israel's "utmost appreciation to an important and valued leader". Prime Minister of Israel Benjamin Netanyahu paid tribute to Mr Lee Kuan Yew by stating that he "was not only a great leader of his nation, but also a figure of great international renown", leading Singapore to "become an economic powerhouse by harnessing the ingenuity and entrepreneurial spirit of its people".
- Japan: Prime Minister of Japan Shinzo Abe called Lee a "... great Asian leader who laid the foundation for the prosperity of Singapore today."
- Kazakhstan: President of Kazakhstan Nursultan Nazarbayev expressed his condolences. He said that he was a "good friend" of Lee and that he "has made great efforts to strengthen the global authority of Singapore, its development as a leading Asian country". The President also accredited Lee for the good relations between Singapore and Kazakhstan.
- Laos: Prime Minister Thongsing Thammavong described him as "an outstanding leader" who contributed to "the development of friendly ties and cooperation" between Singapore and Laos and among ASEAN countries.
- Macau: the chief executive, Chui Sai On described him as "an old friend of China and one of the most influential politicians and strategists in Asia and the world", and that his "excellent leadership, political vision and pioneering spirit will be always respected and remembered".
- Malaysia: Prime Minister of Malaysia Najib Razak sent his condolences saying "I am saddened to hear about the passing of Lee, founding PM of Singapore" and that Lee's "achievements were great" and "his legacy is assured".
- Former 4th and longest-serving prime minister of Malaysia Mahathir Mohamad wrote in his blog: "The passing away of a man you know well saddens you. Now Kuan Yew is no more. His passage marks the end of the period when those who fought for independence lead their countries and knew the value of independence. ASEAN lost a strong leadership after President Suharto and Lee Kuan Yew."
- Mongolia: President of Mongolia Tsakhiagiin Elbegdorj expressed his condolences. He said that Lee was "an outstanding statesman" and that "his legacy and contributions to the independence and development of Singapore will be remembered forever, which made the country one of the "Four Asian Tigers" economic powerhouses and a leading country in the social, economic sector not only in Asia, but throughout the whole world".
- Nepal: Nepalese prime minister Sushil Koirala expressed condolences to the family of Lee Kuan Yew. Koirala added that Lee was a "legendary leader of his time" and that his "contributions made by him in the rapid transformation of Singapore as a modern and prosperous country remain inspiring. In his death, the world has lost a fine statesman and Singapore its architect". Foreign Minister Mahendra Pandey also expressed condolences on Twitter, he said that Lee's vision and dedication "made himself immortal in the form of modern Singapore. Every political leader must learn from his life".
- North Korea: The premier of North Korea Pak Pong Ju sent his condolences saying that he expressed the deepest condolences to the prime minister and the bereaved families.
- Palestinian National Authority: Palestine Ambassador Saadi Salama Tomeizy expressed condolences over Lee's death on behalf of the president of the State of Palestine Mahmoud Abbas and the Palestinian people.
- Papua New Guinea: Prime Minister of Papua New Guinea, Peter O'Neill expressed his condolences. He wrote that Lee's "political career is a study in triumph over adversity". O'Neill accredited Lee for making Singapore a "true economic success story" and that Lee "transformed the economy of Singapore to deliver higher living standards for his people, and achieved long term GDP growth despite an absence of natural resources". The Prime Minister also acknowledged the instrumental part Lee played in forming good bilateral relations with Papua New Guinea.
- Philippines: Philippine president Benigno Aquino said "An era has passed, one upon which Singaporeans can look back on with deep pride and a sense of accomplishment. Throughout his long life, as prime minister and senior minister, Mr Lee demonstrated an unswerving devotion to his country, turning it into a statement that would be an exemplar of efficient, modern and honest governance. The development of Singapore has earned it the respect of nations and peoples, including the tens of thousands of Filipinos who work there and visit the country."
- Qatar: The Ministry of Foreign Affairs in Qatar announced that the emir of Qatar, Sheikh Tamim bin Hamad Al Thani sent a cable of condolences to President Tony Tan and Prime Minister Lee Hsien Loong. Separately, Deputy Emir Sheikh Abdullah bin Hamad bin Khalifa Al Thani and Prime Minister Sheikh Abdullah bin Nasser bin Khalifa Al Thani also sent condolences.
- South Korea: President Park Geun-hye stated that "... the late Lee Kwan Yew was the father of Singapore and led it to become a centre of finance and commerce through 31 years of rule; his prophesy of a greater Singapore and efforts exerted upon such a goal has garnered respect all around the world, especially in South Korea ... He has visited this nation multiple times and was a friend to the Korean people." She is to also visit the funeral and comfort the family.
- Sri Lanka: Sri Lankan President Maithripala Sirisena extended his condolences to the people and government of Singapore, . He said that Lee "set an example to the world in building up the modern Singapore and has rendered a precious service to buildup world peace".
- Taiwan (Republic of China): President Ma Ying-jeou released a statement calling Lee an "... admirable and outstanding leader."
- Thailand: Prime Minister Prayut Chan-o-cha said that he would like to express his sadness for the passing of Lee Kuan Yew. In addition, the King and Queen of Thailand, offered their condolences to Singapore's president Tony Tan, writing that Lee's "sacrifice and dedication led to the birth and prosperity of the nation"
- Timor Leste: Timor-Leste's prime minister, Rui Maria de Araújo wrote a condolence message, honouring Lee Kuan Yew to Prime Minister Lee Hsien Loong. He said that the "miracle of Singapore provides many developing countries with a model of progress and a symbol of hope and possibility". He also acknowledge the good relations Lee Kuan Yew established with Timor Leste.
- United Arab Emirates: UAE president Sheikh Khalifa bin Zayed sent his condolences to the people and government of Singapore. In addition, the vice-president and prime minister, Sheikh Mohammed bin Rashid Al Maktoum, and the crown prince of Abu Dhabi, Sheikh Mohammed bin Zayed offered "cables of condolences", according to the Ministry of Foreign Affairs in the United Arab Emirates.
- Vietnam: Prime Minister Nguyen Tan Dung wrote a condolence message stating "The passing of Mr Lee Kuan Yew is a great loss not only to Singapore but to the ASEAN community as a whole. His thinking, and his contribution to Singapore's development will always be a source of encouragement for future generations. Vietnamese people will remember the love and valuable support of Mr Lee Kuan Yew to Vietnam. May the government and people of Singapore soon overcome this difficult time."

==== Europe ====
- France: French president François Hollande offered his condolences saying "As Singapore and France mark the 50th anniversary of the establishment of their diplomatic relations this year, France has lost a friend who had strived to draw our two nations closer and deepen our cooperation in all fields."
- Germany: Angela Merkel, Chancellor of Germany, sent her "heartfelt condolences" to Prime Minister Lee Hsien Loong. She stated that Mr Lee Kuan Yew had led Singapore to "become the epitome of progress and modernity in South-East Asia", "a global centre for trade, logistics, finance and research took place in close cooperation with Germany". She fondly recalled "the stimulating discussion" she had with Mr Lee Kuan Yew during her "visit to Singapore in 2011".
- Italy: Italian prime minister Matteo Renzi sent a message to Prime Minister Lee Hsien Loong to express his "deep and sincere condolences" of the death of Lee Kuan Yew. He added that under Lee Kuan Yew's leadership, Singapore has achieved "extraordinary growth that has led Singapore to become a thriving and prosperous state."
- Lithuania: The president of Lithuania Dalia Grybauskaitė expressed her condolences in a message to President Tony Tan. She said that Lee "took on decisive responsibility for the fate of his country and its people at a very challenging and difficult time for Singapore. A profound and far-sighted statesman, Lee Kuan Yew laid down strong and lasting foundations for modern multicultural Singapore".
- Norway: The Royal House of Norway released a statement of condolences written by King Harald to the Singaporean president. Separately, the prime minister of Norway, Erna Solberg wrote to Singaporean Prime Minister, Lee Hsien Loong to express her condolences to the Lee Kuan Yew. Solberg wrote that Lee Kuan Yew will be remembered for his "visionary leadership" and "extraordinary contributions to Singapore's economic development and social progress, and as a remarkable international statesman".
- Poland: Polish president Bronisław Komorowski wrote in a letter of condolences to President Tony Tan that he was grieved to hear the demise of Lee Kuan Yew. He said that Lee was "eminent politician and the creator of modern Singapore state" and that Lee was "one of the greatest Asian leaders, ... completely devoted to his country, building its position and prosperity" Polish prime minister Ewa Kopacz also wrote a letter of condolences. She wrote that Lee was a "prominent politician and charismatic leader" and that the creation of Singapore was due to Lee's "creation of an outstanding political elite capable of courageous and effective management of the country".
- Russia: Russian president Vladimir Putin sent his condolences saying "Over his decades of work as prime minister and in other high government posts, he earned his compatriots' sincere love and respect and won the highest international influence."
- Spain: Spanish prime minister Mariano Rajoy Brey expressed the sadness of the Government of Spain upon learning of the demise of Lee Kuan Yew. A government spokesman said that Lee "facilitated the transformation of Singapore into an economic and financial centre of global importance and a benchmark in the Asia-Pacific region. Lee "helped make South-east Asia a region of peace and stability, and improve the quality of life of its people". The spokesman also said that "Lee Kuan Yew was a statesman whose ideas had a profound influence on Asia-Pacific development and served as a benchmark for many other statesmen".
- Turkey: Turkish president Recep Tayyip Erdoğan called Singaporean prime minister Lee Hsien Loong to offer his heartfelt condolences for the death of his father the founder of Singapore Lee Kuan Yew. Also The Ministry of Foreign Affairs of Turkey issued an official statement of condolence for death of Lee Kuan Yew.
- United Kingdom: UK prime minister David Cameron said Lee was "a friend of Britain".
- Former UK prime minister Tony Blair paid tribute to Lee Kuan Yew by saying that he "was one of the most extraordinary leaders of modern times", "a genuine political giant" who was "the first to understand that modern politics was about effective Government not old-fashioned ideology" and gave advice "with typical acumen and frankness".
- UK Queen Elizabeth II said Lee's "vision and dedication to the service of his country helped to make Singapore the successful country it is today."

==== Oceania ====
- Australia: Prime Minister of Australia, Tony Abbott said "Today, we mourn the passing of a giant of our region. Fifty years ago, Lee Kuan Yew led a vulnerable, fledgling nation to independence. Today, thanks to his vision and determination, Singapore is one of the world's most successful countries."
- Fiji: Frank Bainimarama, Prime Minister of Fiji, paid tribute to Lee's vision and commitment to building Singapore into "a nation now envied across the globe".
- New Zealand: Prime Minister of New Zealand John Key said "Lee Kuan Yew's courage, determination, commitment, character and ability made him a formidable leader who held the respect of Singaporeans and the international community alike. His loss will be deeply felt by his family and the people of Singapore. I had the honour of meeting Mr Lee in 2007 during his last official visit to New Zealand. He was well known for his insights and foresight but what struck me most was his unwavering determination to see Singapore succeed." Additionally, Deputy Prime Minister Bill English tabled a motion in the New Zealand Parliament to mourn the loss of Lee Kuan Yew. The national flag will be flown half-mast on 29 March 2015 to mark the funeral of the late Mr Lee Kuan Yew.

=== Prominent persons ===
- Rupert Murdoch, chairman of News Corporation, called Lee a "great uncompromising statesman" and said his advice was "always wise".
- Li Ka-shing, a Hong Kong business magnate, said Lee was a "veritable force of nature" who accomplished what few managed to do. He conveyed his heartfelt condolences over the death of Lee.
- Robert Kuok, a Malaysian billionaire businessman, said Lee "did not allow anything to stand in his way" of achieving his dream for a prosperous nation.
- Gina Rinehart, an Australian billionaire businesswomen, said "I have such an immense admiration for your very fine leader".
- Ama Ata Aidoo, a Ghanaian author, poet, playwright and academic said that Lee's death is a "grim reminder of what Ghanaians missed out in Kwame Nkrumah". She added that "right from when they were both alive, I had always known–at least from the news and stuff–that Lee Kuan Yew was doing for Singapore what Kwame Nkrumah was trying to do for us here in Ghana."
- Steve Forbes, an American publishing executive, wrote on his blog after Lee's death that he was "one of the great statesmen of the post-WWII era. He made Singapore an economic powerhouse, demonstrating that so-called natural resources aren't necessary for prosperity, that the key is creating an environment in which human ingenuity can thrive". Forbes also acknowledged Lee's intolerance for corruption and foreign policy decision.
- Muthuvel Karunanidhi, an Indian politician who has served as Chief Minister of Tamil Nadu and chief the Dravida Munnetra Kazhagam (DMK) party said that Tamils across the world has lost a "good friend". He added that Lee "brought together various nationalities—Tamils, Malaysians and Chinese—and made Tamil one of the official languages" in Singapore.
- The Dalai Lama, conveyed his heartfelt condolences over the death of Lee. He said that Lee was an "exemplary nation builder" and that he had made and extraordinary contribution with vision and determination to Singapore's evolution into a highly developed, prosperous state. He said that the "best tribute that can be paid to the late leader is to maintain the dedication he showed to Singapore, which has become a state its citizens can be proud of and which the world at large views as a model of education, peace and diversity."
- Fareed Zakaria, journalist and columnist, paid tribute to Lee by saying that he was a man of both great ideas and great action, "conceptualising and strategising but then also executing. He saw the big picture but then he could fill in the details."

=== International brands ===
- MasterCard grayscaled their logos on social media profile on Facebook and "express our deepest condolences to the family of Singapore's founding father, Mr. Lee Kuan Yew."
- Visa grayscaled their logos on social media profile on Facebook and "express its sincere condolences at the passing of Singapore's First Prime Minister Lee Kuan Yew."
- Citibank in a Facebook post said, "We will always remember Mr Lee as a visionary leader who has dedicated his life to transforming Singapore into a thriving international hub it is today."
- MayBank in a Facebook post said, "His legacy and achievements are intertwined and reflected in the success of Singapore as a young nation. He will always remain a source of inspiration for generations to come."
- KFC in a Facebook post said, "He was a man with remarkable foresight and vision, and have built Singapore to what she is today."
- Pizza Hut in a Facebook post said, "Singapore would not be the country she is today without his vision and leadership."
- McDonald's in a Facebook post said, "McDonald's Singapore joins the nation in remembering former Prime Minister, Mr Lee Kuan Yew."
- IBM in a Facebook post said, "Thank you Mr Lee Kuan Yew for your visionary leadership, relentless courage, unwavering determination and enduring inspiration."
- Nestlé in a Facebook post said, "We recall his strength and profound convictions and his unreserved dedication to public service will continue to inspire us."
- Reebok in a Facebook post said, "Let us take a moment to honor his invaluable contributions, indomitable dedication, and astute foresight in transforming a mudflat into a metropolis."
- Airbnb in a Facebook post said, "Our thoughts are with Prime Minister Lee and his family, as we mourn the passing of one of our founding fathers Lee Kuan Yew."
- Intel in a Facebook post said, "We are deeply saddened that Singapore has lost its founding father, Mr. Lee Kuan Yew. We express our heartfelt condolences, and our thoughts are with his family in this time of sorrow."
- Samsung in a Facebook post said, "We know him for his strengths, his hopes, his dreams. Today we mourn his passing."
- Singapore Airlines in a media statement said, "A visionary leader, Mr Lee led Singapore's transformation into a global city and played a pivotal role in developing Singapore into an international aviation hub. We are deeply appreciative of his contributions to the nation and the aviation industry."
- Singtel in a media statement said, "We are grateful for his leadership in transforming Singapore, which has allowed us to enjoy and build on its many successes and strengths."
- Tribal DDB created a website showing moving images of Lee from public tweets.
- Marvel grayscaled their logos on social media profile on Facebook.
- Carlsberg grayscaled their logos on social media profile on Facebook.
- 20th Century Fox grayscaled their logos on social media profile on Facebook.
- Walt Disney Studios grayscaled their logos on social media profile on Facebook.
- Cotton On (Rubi, Factorie, Typo), New Look, Sephora, Topshop, Sony and Uniqlo also expressed sincere condolences to Lee Kuan Yew.

=== Football Clubs ===
- Association football clubs Liverpool, Manchester United, Arsenal, Chelsea, Borussia Dortmund and Valencia gave their condolences as well.

== Memorial ==
=== 1st (2016) ===
Led by People's Association deputy chairman Chan Chun Sing, more than a hundred remembrance events were held across the island in March 2016, including a tree-planting exercise at Jurong Lake Park and a brisk walk at Sembawang Park. A remembrance service was held at Tanjong Pagar Community Club on 23 March 2016.

=== Legacy ===
As Lee liked to keep his personal life private, he publicly expressed his opinion on numerous occasions in the news when he was alive that he wouldn't like for Singapore to build a "personality cult" on him after his death as he, as with many other Singaporeans, was just a Singaporean who loved Singapore. In his biography books, he had written specifically that he did not want any road to be named after him or his wife, as he was personally against the idea. As a result, a committee to create a Founders' Memorial, dedicated not just to Lee but to all of Singapore's founders during the early years of sovereignty, was consequently formed.
