= Kentucky Public Pensions Authority =

Pension and insurance provider for public employees in Kentucky, U.S.

The Kentucky Public Pensions Authority
Agency overview
- Preceding agency: Kentucky Retirement System
- Type: Pension fund
- Jurisdiction: Kentucky
- Headquarters: Frankfort, Kentucky
- Website: kyret.ky.gov/Pages/index.aspx

The Kentucky Public Pensions Authority (KPPA), formerly known as The Kentucky Retirement Systems (KRS), is the administrator of defined-benefit pension and insurance plans for most of Kentucky's state and county employees and retirees. KPPA oversees Kentucky's three separate retirement systems: Kentucky Employee Retirement System (KERS), County Employee Retirement System (CERS) and State Police Retirement System (SPRS). CERS and KERS are multiple-employer, cost-sharing defined-benefit pension plans with Non-Hazardous and Hazardous members. SPRS is a single-employer, defined-benefit pension plan with Hazardous members. Each system covers regular full-time members employed by the participating agencies. Kentucky's public employee pension system has been ranked one of the most underfunded public pension systems in the country.

== Membership ==
KPPA members include over 386,000 active, inactive and retired state and local government employees, state police officers, and non-teaching staff of local school boards and regional universities.

== Organization ==
KPPA is governed by a 8-member Board of Trustees consisting of the chairs of the KRS and CERS board, the chairs of their respective investment committees, an elected member from each board and an appointed member of each board. Its headquarters is located in Frankfort, Kentucky.

== Funding ==
As of June 30, 2020, the KPPA total assets stood at $18.2 billion, composed of $12.7 billion in the pension funds and $5.5 billion in the insurance funds. The total unfunded liabilities range from $40 billion to $60 billion, an amount that is four to six times the size of Kentucky's General Fund Budget. As of 2021, the KPPA was only 33% funded across all its funds, and only 14% funded for its primary state government fund, making it one of the worst-funded pension plans in the U.S.

== Controversies ==
In December 2017 a lawsuit was filed in Franklin County KY Circuit Court by eight individual defined-benefit plan beneficiaries of KPPA (formerly known as KRS) who purported to sue derivatively on behalf of KRS, and as taxpayers on behalf of the Commonwealth of Kentucky. The lawsuit sought monetary damages arising from allegations that defendant hedge fund managers KKR, Prisma Capital Partners, Blackstone Group and PAAMCO (PAAMCO), created and sold unsuitable, high-risk, high-fee hedge funds to KRS. Other defendants in the suit include a number of former KRS trustees and officials, who are accused of fumbling the hedge fund investment decisions, as well as KRS’ investment consulting firm RVK (formally R.V. Kuhns and Associates) was also exposed for having encouraged similar decisions at the Pennsylvania State Pension and Retirement System (SERS). The State's Treasurer, Joe Torsella, revealed that RVK's recommendations contributed to an estimated $5.5 billion in waste. It was also reported that despite the 11-member board's awareness of the problem, they "quietly approved another 10-year investment plan, developed by RVK Inc., that would continue to focus on the alternative investments" that produced the waste. Finally, the KPPA's actuarial advisers are accused of providing the pension system's Board of Trustees with inaccurate information.

On July 9, 2020, the Kentucky Supreme Court ruled the lawsuit should be dismissed because the public worker plaintiffs lacked standing to sue on behalf of KRS. Shortly thereafter, the Kentucky Attorney General Daniel Cameron successfully revived and expanded the lawsuit, joining as a plaintiff seeking damages on behalf of the Commonwealth of Kentucky. On April 14, 2023, the Kentucky Court of Appeals affirmed the trial court's dismissal of the original complaint and vacated the order, allowing the Kentucky attorney general to intervene.

== See also ==
- Public employee pension plans in the United States
