= Public employee pension plans in the United States =

U.S. public pension plans

In the United States, public sector pensions are offered at the federal, state, and local levels of government. They are available to most, but not all, public sector employees. These employer contributions to these plans typically vest after some period of time, e.g. 5 years of service. These plans may be defined-benefit or defined-contribution pension plans, but the former have been most widely used by public agencies in the U.S. throughout the late twentieth century. Some local governments do not offer defined-benefit pensions but may offer a defined contribution plan. In many states, public employee pension plans are known as Public Employee Retirement Systems (PERS).

Pension benefits may or may not be changed after an employee is hired, depending on the state and plan, as well as hiring date, years of service, and grandfathering.

Retirement age in the public sector is usually lower than in the private sector. Public pension plan managers in the United States take higher risks investing the funds than ones outside the United States or those in the private sector.

== History ==
Public pensions got their start with various promises, informal and legislated, made to veterans of the Revolutionary War and, more extensively, the Civil War. They were expanded greatly, and began to be offered by a number of state and local governments during the early Progressive Era in the late nineteenth century.

Federal civilian pensions were offered under the Civil Service Retirement System (CSRS), formed in 1920. CSRS provided retirement, disability and survivor benefits for most civilian employees in the federal government, until the creation of a new federal agency, the Federal Employees Retirement System (FERS), in 1987.

== Federal ==
- Federal Employees Retirement System - covers approximately 2.44 million full-time civilian employees (as of Dec 2005).

Retired pay for U.S. Armed Forces retirees is, strictly speaking, not a pension but instead is a form of retainer pay. U.S. military retirees do not vest into a retirement system while they are on active duty; eligibility for non-disability retired pay is solely based upon time in service. Unlike other retirees, U.S. military retirees are subject to involuntary recall to active duty at any time, though the likelihood of such a recall is remote, especially after age 60. In 2008, there were 1,983,467 retired military in the US. There were 856,677 receiving military pensions, the remainder carrying their longevity into federal civil service positions.

== State ==
Each of the 50 US states has at least one retirement system for its employees. There are 3.68 million full-time and 1.39 million part-time state-level-government civilian employees as of 2002.

- Alabama - Retirement Systems of Alabama
- Alaska - Alaska Retirement System
- Arizona - Arizona State Retirement System (ASRS, see external ASRS homepage) and Public Safety Personnel Retirement System of Arizona (PSPRS, see external PSPRS homepage)
- Arkansas - Arkansas currently has six retirement systems which cover most employees at the state and local level: Judicial Retirement, Public Employees Retirement, State Highway Employees Retirement, State Police Retirement, District Judges Retirement, and Teacher Retirement.
- California - CalPERS (California Public Employees' Retirement System), CalSTRS (California State Teachers' Retirement System)
- Colorado - Colorado Public Employees Retirement Association, see external homepage
- Connecticut - Connecticut Teachers' Retirement Board
- Delaware - Delaware Public Employees Retirement System (DPERS), see external homepage
- Florida - State Board of Administration of Florida (SBA), see external SBA homepage
- Georgia - Employees' Retirement System of Georgia (ERSGA, see external homepage) and Teachers Retirement System (TRS, see external homepage).
- Hawaii - State of Hawaii Employees' Retirement System (ERS), see
- Idaho - Public Employee Retirement System of Idaho (PERSI), see
- Illinois - State Employees' Retirement System (SERS)
- Indiana - Indiana Public Retirement System (INPRS)
- Iowa - Iowa Public Employees Retirement System (IPERS), see external IPERS homepage
- Kansas - Kansas Public Employees Retirement System (KPERS)
- Kentucky - Kentucky Public Pensions Authority (KPPA), see external KPPA homepage
- Louisiana - Louisiana State Employees' Retirement System (LASERS), see external LASERS homepage
- Maine - Maine Public Employees Retirement System (MainePERS)
- Maryland - Maryland State Retirement and Pension System (SRPS)
- Massachusetts - Massachusetts State Board of Retirement (Massachusetts Pension Reserves Investment Trust)
- Michigan - Michigan Office of Retirement Services, see external homepage
- Minnesota - Public Employees Retirement Association of Minnesota, see external PERA homepage
- Mississippi - PERS (Public Employees' Retirement System), which also administers the Mississippi Highway Safety Patrol Retirement System (MHSPRS), Supplemental Legislative Retirement Plan (SLRP), and Municipal Retirement Systems (MRS); see external homepage
- Missouri - Missouri State Employees Retirement System
- Montana - Montana Public Employee Retirement Administration, see external MPERA homepage
- Nebraska - Nebraska Public Employees Retirement Systems
- Nevada - Public Employees' Retirement System of Nevada
- New Hampshire - New Hampshire Retirement System
- New Jersey - Public Employees' Retirement System, Teachers' Pension and Annuity Fund, Police and Firemen's Retirement System, State Police Retirement System, Judicial Retirement System, Alternate Benefit Program, Defined Contribution Retirement Program, see external NJ Division of Pension and Benefits page
- New Mexico - Public Employees Retirement Association of New Mexico, see external PERA homepage
- New York - New York State and Local Retirement System, New York State Local Police and Fire Retirement System, New York State Teachers' Retirement System
- North Carolina - North Carolina Retirement Systems (NCRS), see external North Carolina Department of State Treasurer (NCDST)
- North Dakota - North Dakota Public Employees Retirement System, see
- Ohio - Ohio Public Employees Retirement System
- Oklahoma - Oklahoma Public Employees Retirement System
- Oregon - Oregon Public Employees Retirement System
- Pennsylvania - State Employees' Retirement System and Public School Employees' Retirement System
- Rhode Island - Employees' Retirement System of Rhode Island (ERSRI)
- South Carolina - South Carolina Retirement System (PEBA)
- South Dakota - South Dakota Retirement System (SDRS)
- Tennessee - Tennessee State Consolidated Retirement System
- Texas - Employees Retirement System of Texas (ERS), see external ERS homepage, and Teacher Retirement System of Texas (TRS), see
- Utah - Utah Retirement Systems
- Vermont - Vermont Pension Investment Commission / Vermont State Employees' Retirement System
- Virginia - Virginia Retirement System, see external varetire.org
- Washington - Washington Department of Retirement Systems, see external https://www.drs.wa.gov/
- West Virginia - West Virginia Consolidated Public Retirement Board (CPRB)
- Wisconsin - Wisconsin Dept of Employee Trust Funds
- Wyoming - Wyoming Retirement System (WRS)

== Funding ==
Since 2001, U.S. statewide pension funds have experienced significant funding challenges due to the recessions of 2001–2002 and 2008–2009. Prior to the dot-com crash, statewide pension funds were over 95.6% funded in the aggregate. In 2002, the funded ratio had declined to 82.1%. While funds did mostly recover by 2008, the Great Recession resulted in funded ratios declining to 63.8% in 2009.

Over the following decade, funding levels improved from their post-recession lows, until the COVID-19 pandemic ushered in a period of market volatility. The Equable Institute estimated the aggregate funded ratio for state and local retirement systems at 69.4% as of September 2020. Following record investment returns, that figure rose to 83.9% for fiscal year 2021. In 2022, market corrections produced the largest single-year decline since 2009, bringing the aggregate funded ratio to 77.3% based on data available through December 31, 2022. Public pension plans averaged a −6.14% investment return in 2022, against an average assumed rate of return of 6.9%.

Equable Institute estimated unfunded liabilities for state and local plans at $1.45 trillion for the 2022 fiscal year, after the figure had briefly fallen below $1 trillion in 2021. While national aggregates provide insight into larger trends, funded ratios vary significantly by state. The size of unfunded liabilities relative to a state's GDP provides one measure of the resources needed to restore retirement systems to full funding.

As of the end of 2022, Illinois and Kentucky had the lowest aggregate funded ratios in the nation, while pension systems in Iowa, Tennessee, New York, Nebraska, Wisconsin, and South Dakota maintained average funded statuses above 90%.

== Local ==
Many U.S. cities are allowed to participate in the pension plans of their states; some of the largest have their own pension plans. The total number of local government employees in the United States as of 2020 is 14.3 million. There are 11.1 million full-time and 3.1 million part-time local-government civilian employees as of 2020.

== Local Funding ==
Funded ratios for statewide and municipally-managed plans have historically tended to move together, as both are affected by investment performance and changes to actuarial assumptions. The Equable Institute reported that the aggregate funded ratio for municipally-managed plans in 2021 was near its highest point in recent history. Most public pension unfunded liabilities reside within statewide retirement systems rather than local ones, primarily because statewide systems are larger, with more members and more promised benefits.

== Benefits ==
Pension benefits in the U.S. can vary widely. The pension replacement rate, or percentage of a worker's pre-retirement income that the pension replaces, varies significantly across states and benefit tiers within state retirement systems. Whether or not a worker is enrolled in social security can significantly impact how secure a public worker's retirement is. This varies widely by state and profession.

Pension benefits are primarily designed to favor workers who work a full career (typically at least 25 years of service), a group that accounts for approximately 24% of state-level public workers. In a study of 335 statewide retirement plans, the Equable Institute found that 74.1% of pension plans in the US served this group of workers well by its criteria. The same study found that workers with tenures of 10–25 years of service were served well by 10.9% of plans, and workers with less than 10 years of service by 0.5% of plans.

In another study, the Equable Institute found that the total lifetime value of teacher pension benefits declined by $100,000 on average (13%) since 2005. A teacher hired for the 2005 school year could expect to earn $768,000 in retirement benefits, whereas a teacher hired for the 2023 school year can expect to earn $668,000.

== See also ==
- Political divisions of the United States
- States of the United States related lists
- Retirement plans in the United States
- Social Security Administration
