= Timothy A. Chorba =

American diplomat (born 1946)

United States Ambassador to Singapore
- In office August 15, 1994 – January 7, 1998
- President: Bill Clinton
- Preceded by: Ralph L. Boyce
- Succeeded by: Steven J. Green

Personal details
- Born: Timothy Aloysius Chorba; September 23, 1946 (age 79) Yonkers, New York, U.S.
- Education: Regis High School; Georgetown University; Harvard Law School
- Profession: Diplomat

Military service
- Allegiance: United States
- Branch/service: United States Army

Timothy Aloysius Chorba (born September 23, 1946) served as the United States Ambassador to Singapore from 1994 to 1997.

== Education ==
He was born in Yonkers, New York, and attended Regis High School in Manhattan. He graduated from Georgetown University in 1968, where he was in ROTC and a member of the Philodemic Society. He studied International Relations in 1968-69 as a Fulbright Scholar at the University of Heidelberg. He earned his law degree from Harvard Law School in 1972 and then completed his service in the U.S. Army.

Following his tenure, Chorba continued his work as a partner at Patton Boggs in Washington, D.C.

Diplomatic posts
Preceded by Ralph L. Boyce	United States Ambassador to Singapore; 1994–1998	Succeeded by Steven J. Green
