= STRS Ohio =

Pension fund for Ohio public school teachers

State Teachers Retirement System
Agency overview
- Formed: 1920; 106 years ago
- Jurisdiction: State of Ohio
- Headquarters: 275 E. Broad St. Columbus, Ohio 43215
- Employees: 500+
- Website: www.strsoh.org

The State Teachers Retirement System of Ohio (STRS Ohio) provides retirement, healthcare, disability, and survivor benefits for Ohio's 543,000 public educators and their families. STRS Ohio was established in 1920, and is described as legally separate and fiscally independent from the state government of Ohio.

As of June 30, 2024, STRS managed a net portfolio position worth $96.2 billion, placing it among the largest pension schemes in the United States. Despite this size, as of August 2024 the system's funded ratio left $20 billion in unfunded liabilities.

Following a series of governance issues and significant investment losses, STRS has faced scrutiny in the 2020s for its approach that includes internal active management of investments and a relatively large portfolio of alternative assets. The investments in alternatives such as private equity and hedge funds have been criticized as carrying excessive risk and lacking transparency. In 2021, the fund acknowledged a loss of $525 million on a single private equity investment, Panda Power Funds. The following year, losses across the portfolio totaled $5.3 billion. The fund's investment losses in the now-defunct Silicon Valley Bank and cryptocurrency platform FTX were also subjects of controversy.

== Membership ==
STRS Ohio included over 543,000 members as of 2025. Ohio public school teachers and administrators are members of STRS, and faculty at public institutions of higher education can opt to join when they are initially hired. The various educational institutions and school districts whose employees are STRS members total over 1,133.

These members select from the following retirement plans:

- Defined Benefit
- Defined Contribution
- Combined Option

STRS members are not eligible for Social Security, leaving STRS payments as the only retirement benefits for most retired public educators in Ohio.

Members who participate in the defined benefit plan have historically received an inflation-pegged cost of living adjustment as part of a pension arrangement designed to provide retirement security for teachers. This has been described as part of the tradeoff made by public sector employees, who often take jobs with long term benefits to offset comparatively low annual compensation. The average public educator in Ohio makes $67,000 annually. STRS members are typically required to attain at least 34 years of service to be eligible for retirement benefits, and their average end of career compensation is $88,794 as of fiscal year 2024.

Following poor investment performance and ballooning unfunded liabilities, costs of participating in the retirement system have increased for teachers, while benefits have been cut. Beginning in 2012, the retirement system implemented changes to teacher retirement benefits in an effort to improve the percentage of future benefits covered by the value of the fund. The changes included increasing the annual contributions required from teachers' annual salary from 10% to 14% and increasing the retirement age and years of service required for retirement.

In 2016, retiree cost of living adjustments were cut first to 2% that year, then frozen in 2017. Between 2017 and 2024, STRS retirees received a 4% cost of living adjustment while inflation rose by 30% over the same period, due in part to the 2021–2023 inflation surge.

== Governance ==
=== State teachers retirement board ===
STRS Ohio is governed by a retirement board consisting of five elected contributing teacher members, two elected retired teacher members, an investment expert appointed by the governor of Ohio, an investment expert appointed jointly by the speaker of the House and the Senate president, an investment expert designated by the treasurer of state, and the director of the Department of Education and Workforce or their designated investment expert.

=== Executive staff ===
Internally, STRS Ohio is managed by an executive director, three deputy executive directors and seven senior staff members, and employs about 500 associates. Collectively, these employees make up the investment staff that implement an active investing strategy in which pension funds are internally managed by the staff, with a portion of the portfolio entrusted to alternative asset firms. STRS has claimed that internal management saves the retirement system participants more than $130 million in fund management fees annually.

The balance of the fund is entrusted to more than 100 different external managers, who are paid an assortment of fees for management, performance, committed capital, carried interest, and other investment expenses totaling between $650 million and $800 million per year. Management fees alone totaled approximately $300 million annually as of 2021.

==== Performance-based incentives controversy ====
Following announced losses of $3 billion from investments in fiscal year 2022, a move by STRS to grant its investment staff performance-based incentives totaling $10 million attracted criticism from teachers and retirees who argued that investment losses should not be incentivized with bonuses at a time when the retirement system was increasing costs and reducing benefits for participants. Two months after the bonuses were approved, outrage was again sparked in October 2022 when the investment losses were revised to total $5.3 billion, losses 77% greater than announced prior to the vote on bonuses. Months later in April 2023, STRS proposed a 31% increase in staff bonuses.

Following the bankruptcy of FTX and arrest of Sam Bankman-Fried in December 2022, it was revealed that STRS had lost its $10 million investment in the cryptocurrency exchange. Four months later, STRS announced in March 2023 that it had suffered a single day loss of $27.2 million following the collapse of Silicon Valley Bank. Concerns around the bank had led the share price to decrease leading up to the bank run and subsequent collapse, but STRS did not disclose the total cost of the investment at the time that the 171,000 shares of parent company SVB Financial Group were actually purchased, which may have been at least $39.3 million, according to an SEC filing. As of the March 31, 2022 form 13F filed by STRS, the fund declared ownership of 150,604 shares then valued at $84.25 million. The filing for the previous quarter indicated 48,511 shares held, valued at $32.9 million. The fund increased its holdings in SVB by 102,093 shares in the quarter ending March 31, 2022, representing an additional investment of at least $50 million in that quarter alone. This far exceeds the losses of $27.2 million reported by STRS investment staff.

=== Ongoing governance concerns (2020 to present) ===
==== Audit delinquency ====
STRS is required to conduct investment performance audits every 10 years with the Ohio Retirement Study Council. The 2006 audit included a recommendation to establish an external benchmark for the evaluation of alternative investments. Controversially, STRS had used its own performance to evaluate these investments. STRS declined to establish an external performance benchmark for alternatives until 2021, remaining out of compliance with audit recommendations during the 15 year period.

Following the 2006 audit, no audit was conducted for 15 years, causing a 5 year delinquency in oversight from ORSC and the Ohio State Auditor in the period from 2016 until an audit was conducted in 2021. The investments in Panda Power Funds, Silicon Valley Bank, and FTX were made during this period.

==== Executive director termination ====
In part due to the performance of investments made and overseen by the STRS senior staff, in February 2023 the fund's executive director Bill Neville was subject to a confidence vote by the Retirement Board that ended in a 5-5 deadlock. Neville was later terminated by the board in September 2024 as part of an end-of-employment agreement that included payments to Neville totaling $1.65 million to leave the position. In the period leading up to his end-of-employment agreement, Neville had been suspended since November 2023 following allegations of sexual harassment and verbal aggression.

The position of executive director remains vacant as of May 2025, and is filled on an acting basis.

== Finances ==
As of June 30, 2024, STRS managed a net portfolio position worth $96.2 billion, including $91 billion in the pension. According to the Financial Times, STRS had generated unfunded liabilities of $20 billion as of 2024. The inability of the fund's investment returns to cover benefits for retirees without substantial cuts has led to widespread criticism of STRS investment practices.

=== Active management ===
A central objection to the investment strategy adopted by STRS is the emphasis on actively managing the entire fund. Critics of this approach observe that paid money managers fail to beat indexed funds in the long run, a criticism of active management made by Warren Buffett and supported by reputable data, including the SPIVA index from S&P Global Ratings. Commentators have estimated that the fund underperformed indexes by 1.62% annually from 2008 to 2021, resulting in an estimated opportunity cost of $12.5 billion over this time period.

=== Private equity and hedge fund involvement ===
A common focus of media coverage of STRS has been the extent to which pension funds have been entrusted to alternative assets, like private equity firms and hedge funds. Critics point to high fees and disappointing returns for this class of investment, sometimes including large losses to the fund. Alternative investments, which carry high fees that amounted to at least $300 million for STRS in 2021, provided the fund lower returns than traditional investments for the decade 2012-2022, with traditional investments returning 14.8% annually, against 11.84% for alternatives.

In 2021, these investments totaled approximately 18% of fund value. That year, scrutiny of the role of private equity in the pension fund was intensified by the failure of Panda Power Funds, a company that constructed environmentally friendly power plants. After a series of investments from 2011 to 2013 totaling $525 million, the company went bankrupt and entered liquidation, bringing the value of the decade-long investment to zero. Critics also claimed that alternative investments reduced transparency, noting that while Panda had announced bankruptcy in 2018, the loss to the pension fund was not revealed until 2021. Despite this criticism, public figures released by STRS indicated that alternative asset investments had grown to 19.8% of the total fund value in fiscal year 2024.

== See also ==
- CalPERS
- Private equity#Debate
- Jeffrey Tarrant#Buffett bet
