= Stephen T. Owens =

American lawyer

Stephen T. Owens (born 1948) is a civil trial lawyer in Los Angeles, California with the law firm of Alvarez-Glasman & Colvin. Previously, Owens was a partner in the international law firms of Squire Patton Boggs and Graham & James LLP for approximately 39 years.

== Awards ==
- 1992 – President's Pro Bono Service Award, State Bar of California
- 1993 – John Minor Wisdom Award for Professionalism and Public Service, American Bar Association
