= Virginia Retirement System =

Retirement system for public employees in Virginia

Agency overview
- Formed: 1942
- Headquarters: 1200 East Main Street, Richmond, Virginia 23219
- Agency executive: Patricia S. Bishop, Director
- Website: varetire.org

The Virginia Retirement System is an independent state agency that administers pension plans, retirement savings plans, and other benefits to public employees in the U.S. state of Virginia. As of 2018, the agency ranks as the 14th largest public or private pension fund in the United States and is the 42nd largest retirement system in the world.

== Membership ==
As of 2022, there are approximately 835 state employers participating in the system, including municipalities, counties, school districts, colleges and universities, law enforcement agencies, judiciary agencies, and state agencies. The Virginia Retirement System currently serves more than 750,000 members, beneficiaries, and retirees.

== Governance ==
The Virginia Retirement System is governed by a 9-member Board of Trustees, which is a shared responsibility of the Governor of Virginia and the Virginia General Assembly. The legislature's Joint Legislative Audit and Review Commission is responsible for oversight of the system. The current director of the system, Patricia Bishop, was appointed in 2015.

== History ==
The Virginia Retirement System was established in 1942, originally opening its membership to state and school district employees. In 1944, the scope of the system was expanded to include employees of municipalities and counties in the state. In 1995 and 1996, the Constitution of Virginia was amended to require that the system's trust funds be established and operated as independent trusts.

== Benefits ==
The system administers defined benefit pension plans, defined contribution plans, and hybrid plans for Virginia's public sector employees. The system also offers a program known as a Cost-of-Living Adjustment, which graduates member payments with the current amount of state inflation.

== See also ==
- Public employee pension plans in the United States
- List of largest pension funds in the United States
