= Squire Patton Boggs =

Global law firm

- No. of offices: 48 (2026)
- No. of attorneys: 1,500 (2026)
- Major practice areas: General practice
- Key people: Mark J. Ruehlmann; (Chairman and Global CEO); Stephen C. Mahon; (Global Managing Partner); Michele Connell; (Global Managing Partner); Ed Newberry; (Global Managing Partner); Andrew Wilkinson; (European Managing Partner); Gassan Baloul; (Executive Group); Fred Nance; (Executive Group)
- Revenue: ▲US$1.421 billion (2025)
- Profit per equity partner: ▲US$2.510 million (2025)
- Date founded: 1890 in Cleveland as Squire, Sanders & Dempsey; 1887 in Leeds as Hammond Suddards; 1962 in Washington D.C. as Patton Boggs
- Company type: Swiss association
- Website: www.squirepattonboggs.com

Squire Patton Boggs is an international law firm with over 40 offices in 20 countries. It was formed in 2014 by the merger of multinational law firm Squire Sanders with Washington, D.C.–based Patton Boggs. It is one of the largest law firms in the world by total headcount and gross revenue, twelfth largest firm in the UK by revenue, and one of the top 12 by number of countries occupied.

Its largest offices are in Washington, D.C., Leeds, London and Cleveland, each having more than 100 lawyers. The firm serves a diverse base of legal clients ranging from Fortune 100 and FTSE Index 100 corporations to newly emerging companies, private clients and local and national governmental entities.

According to a 2025 analysis, the company is the public relations firm most heavily used by dictatorships. The company lobbies on behalf of the entity of the Saudi government that was directly responsible for the murder of journalist Jamal Khashoggi; after the murder, the company continued to represent the entity for years until a pressure campaign led the company to drop the client. Due to its lobbying role for Saudi Arabia, multiple members of Congress refused to interact with representatives of the firm. In early 2025, the company registered as a lobbyist for the Rashtriya Swayamsevak Sangh, a far-right Hindu paramilitary organisation embroiled in orchestrating violence against Christians and Muslims in India.

Squire Patton Boggs is currently among the largest lobbying firms in the world. The lobbying arm, long managed by Thomas Hale Boggs Jr., is currently managed by Edward Newberry and Robert Kapla.

== History ==
=== Squire, Sanders & Dempsey ===
The firm was founded in Cleveland, Ohio, in 1890 as Squire, Sanders & Dempsey by Cleveland attorneys Andrew Squire and James H. Dempsey, and Judge William B. Sanders.

Until the 1990s, it was primarily an Ohio law firm, with the exception of Washington, DC, and offices in several other US cities and Brussels. It was one of the first US law firms to expand into Eastern Europe in the wake of the Cold War, under the leadership of firm chairman Thomas J. Quigley. It opened several offices in the former Soviet bloc region during the 1990s, taking on a key role in the privatization of state enterprises in the Czech Republic, Slovakia, Hungary, Ukraine and Poland. It subsequently absorbed a number of other legal practices including several Pacific Rim offices of Graham & James and the Florida-based law firm of Steel Hector & Davis. The firm also made overtures toward mergers with Denton Wilde Sapte, Seyfarth Shaw and Bryan Cave under Stanton's leadership.

=== Hammonds ===
Hammonds was an international law firm headquartered in Leeds, United Kingdom, with offices in Beijing, Berlin, Birmingham, Bradford, Brussels, Hong Kong, Leeds, Madrid, Manchester, Munich and Paris. Hammonds' origins date back to the founding of a legal practice in Yorkshire in 1887. Although it was a major firm in Yorkshire and the West Midlands region, it did not open a London office until 1991.

In 2000, Hammond Suddards and Birmingham-based Edge Ellison (previously led by Digby Jones, Baron Jones of Birmingham) merged, forming Hammond Suddards Edge, at that time the 11th-largest law firm in the UK. The firm's rapid expansion left it £30 million in debt in the early 2000s and led to a downsizing through 2005. The firm was ranked 20th in the UK by turnover in The Lawyer UK 100 2006, with a turnover of £132 million. Throughout 2005-2009, the firm underwent significant restructuring under the stewardship of Managing Partner Peter Crossley. As of 2009, the partnership consisted of approximately 180 partners and more than 1,000 employees. Hammonds converted to a Limited Liability Partnership in May 2008.

Hammonds and Squire, Sanders & Dempsey announced that they were in merger talks in August 2010. The partnerships of both firms voted in favor of a merger in November 2010, and it was completed on January 1, 2011, forming the Squire Sanders Swiss association. The merger with Hammonds added offices in Madrid, Berlin, Paris, and Munich to the Squire Sanders network, in addition to significantly boosting its presence in the UK where it previously had only 30 lawyers. London overtook Cleveland as the largest office of the combined firm.

The American Lawyer estimated Squire Sanders to be the 24th largest law firm in the world by number of lawyers and 41st by annual revenue as of 2012.

=== Patton Boggs ===
The firm of Patton Boggs was founded in 1962 by James R. Patton, Jr. and joined soon after by George Blow and Thomas Hale Boggs, Jr. It has "participated in the formation of every major multilateral trade agreement considered by Congress." Boggs joined the firm in 1966 after serving as an economist for the Joint Economic Committee and in the executive office of President Lyndon B. Johnson.

According to OpenSecrets, Patton Boggs was one of the top law firms contributing to federal candidates during the 2012 election cycle, donating US$1.7 million, 67% to Democrats. By comparison, during that same period Akin Gump Strauss Hauer & Feld donated US$2.56 million, 66% to Democrats. Since 1990, Squire Patton Boggs contributed US$14.12 million to federal campaigns, and since 1998 spent US$2.72 million on lobbying.

The 2014 Vault.com survey of more than 18,800 associates ranked Patton Boggs as having the best record for pro bono work in the country, and the firm was among the prestigious white-shoe law firms.

Patton Boggs underwent layoffs and partner exits in 2013 amid a 12% drop in revenue. In May 2014, Patton Boggs paid $15 million as a settlement to Chevron after it pursued damages against Patton Boggs over a lawsuit involving Chevron and Steven Donziger, which Politico described as symbolizing the firm's "weakness and desperation". Patton Boggs entered merger talks with Squire Sanders in 2014 and the firms announced that they would merge on June 1, 2014, under the name Squire Patton Boggs, adding 330 lawyers to the firm's existing headcount.

Squire Patton Boggs now maintains one of the largest lobbying practices in Washington, D.C., gaining extensively from the merger with Patton Boggs, which was the largest US lobbying firm by revenue between 2003 and 2013.

=== Squire Patton Boggs ===
Chart displaying top 25 lobbying firms, (rank for Jan-Jun 2010.) Squire Patton Boggs is on top of the list.

As a result of the merger, Patton Boggs closed its Anchorage, Alaska office, and a number of high-profile attorneys left the firm, including Benjamin Ginsberg and two other prominent Republican lawyers who joined Jones Day, and a number of healthcare-policy lawyers who joined Akin Gump.

The combined firm adopted Squire Sanders' existing merit pay system for partners over Patton Boggs' more traditional "eat what you kill" system. Partner compensation under the merit system ranges from US$300,000 for some non-equity partners to US$3 million for the three most highly compensated partners.

The firm currently posts an abnormally high leverage ratio, with almost eight lawyers to every partner, according to its 2014-end-of-the-year numbers for full-time lawyers. The D.C. offices of Squire Sanders and Patton Boggs recently moved into the same building, previously the long-standing home of legacy Patton Boggs. The combined firm kept separate revenue pools for its two legacy partnerships from the June merger until the end of 2014, but these are now unified.

In 2016, the firm announced a merger with San Francisco–based disputes and compliance boutique Carroll, Burdick & McDonough, adding 50 lawyers in California, China, Hong Kong, and Germany, including a new office near Stuttgart, in Böblingen.

In July 2016, the firm opened an office in Darwin, NT, Australia as part of its Asia-Pacific practice group.

The firm announced that effective January 1, 2017, Fred Nance would become Global Managing Partner of Squire Patton Boggs, U.S. LLP, managing 955 attorneys in 36 offices in 16 countries, including U.S., Asia, the Middle East, and Eastern Europe. This incorporates 688 lawyers in the US and the Dominican Republic. Nance has also been named to the firm's six-member executive committee, where he will be the first African-American partner. Nance has had a storied career with Squire, negotiating a pact between the NFL and the city of Cleveland to return the Browns to the city; becoming a finalist for the position of NFL Commissioner in 2005; saving 1,000 and securing 600 more Defense Finance and Accounting Services (DFAS) jobs for the city, when the Pentagon said it could no longer afford them; and signing up a young high school basketball player, LeBron James, as a client in 2002.

In January 2022, Michele Connell was appointed co-Global Managing Partner alongside Mr. Nance until January 2023 at which point she assumed the role after a transitionary period.

In December 2017, the firm acquired litigation boutique Yarbrough Law Group in Dallas, continuing its expansion in cybersecurity and data privacy law.

In February 2018, the firm opened a new office in Atlanta, Georgia and in 2020 it continued its global expansion, opening an office in Milan, Italy.

The company has lobbied on behalf of the Saudis and continues to do so even after it was speculated that their client Prince Mohammed bin Salman had ordered the 2018 murder of a Saudi-born Washington Post journalist named Jamal Khashoggi for criticizing the absolute monarchy.

To mark the second anniversary of Khashoggi's abduction and murder, and protest the years-long extrajudicial imprisonment and torture of Saudi Arabian feminist activist Loujain al-Hathloul, on 2 October 2020 Amnesty International projected images onto the D.C. office of Squire Patton Boggs—drawing attention to the extensive lobbying Squire Patton Boggs has and continues to engage in on behalf of M.B.S. and other Saudi Aristocrats allegedly responsible, as well as countless other crimes against humanity.

According to a 2025 study, Squire, Patton, Boggs was the most heavily used PR firm employed by authoritarian regimes over the period 1945-2022.

== Notable cases and representations ==
- Represented comedian Dave Chappelle in various transactions since 2005, including his $60 million contract with Netflix in 2016.
- Represented basketball player LeBron James in contract negotiations since his professional debut in 2003.
- Represents Takata Corporation before the United States Congress, National Highway Traffic Safety Administration and United States Department of Transportation on issues relating to air bag safety.
- Represents the Palestinian Authority in relation to procuring aid from the United States government.
- Represents DuPont in multidistrict tort litigation relating to PFOA contamination at the Washington Works plant in West Virginia.
- Represents the government of Turkey as a subcontractor to Gephardt Group in public relations activities related to the Syrian conflict.
- Advised the government of Myanmar on its 2014 telecom joint venture with KDDI and Sumitomo Corporation.
- Squire Sanders represented The Sugar Association and sugar producers in litigation against the Corn Refiners Association and high fructose corn syrup industry regarding the marketing of HFCS as an alternative to sugar. Patton Boggs advised two of the corn refiners involved in the case, leading to an inadvertent conflict of interest following the firms' merger.
- Patton Boggs worked in the mid-1990s for the Guatemalan dictatorship, advocating for its interests before the US Congress. The firm ran a smear campaign against Sister Dianna Ortiz, who was tortured and raped by members of a death squad, describing her instead as the "victim to an out-of-control, sadomasochistic lover."
- Patton Boggs was sued for damages by Chevron with respect to its activities since Spring 2010 on behalf of Burford Capital and other beneficiaries of a US$18 billion judgment obtained by plaintiffs in Ecuador with respect to environmental and health damages resulting from the actions of Texaco, its subsidiary, in the Lago Agrio oil field. The action against Patton Boggs was part of litigation that had been in progress for at least 20 years in a number of national and international venues and on which Chevron was estimated to spend US$250 million a year. In March 2014, the judge in the case issued a scathing ruling that concluded that the plaintiffs' lawyer had indeed violated the RICO statute. Patton Boggs agreed to a settlement in the Chevron litigation, and two partners involved in the litigation left the firm, shortly prior to its merger with Squire Sanders, although an ethical claim filed against the firm shortly before the merger was left outstanding.
- Squire Patton Boggs represents the Central Bank of Venezuela in a Federal court action to prohibit a website, www.dolartoday.com, from publishing a free market exchange rate of the Bolivar Fuerte (BsF "Strong Bolivar") based on what buyers and sellers voluntarily pay at a Colombia border town when trading freely. The dolartoday rate differs by a factor of more than 100 from the official government imposed rate of 6.3. (At which, at the time of this edit, a carton of 30 eggs in Venezuela would in theory cost US$66.66 at the government-imposed price of 420 BsF per carton.)
- Squire Patton Boggs represents defendant Efraín Antonio Campo Flores, one of two Venezuelan Defendants charged with violating various sections of Title 21, USC, by conspiring to fly five kilograms and more of cocaine into the United States. The other Defendant is Franqui Francisco Flores de Freitas. As was widely reported in the press, Mssrs. Campo Flores and Flores De Freitas are cousins, and they are nephews of Cilia Flores, a former Speaker of the Venezuelan National Assembly and current First Lady of Venezuela by virtue of her marriage to Nicolás Maduro Moros, President of Venezuela. Also and at the time of this edit, the international press have widely reported that undercover DEA agents filmed the criminal conspiracy of Mssrs. Campo Flores and Flores De Freitas, and that Haitian and DEA authorities subsequently apprehended them at a hotel in Haiti after traveling by private jet from Caracas. Thereafter, and upon executing a search warrant on the Casa de Campo, La Romana, Dominican Republic home and 135 foot yacht of Mr. Flores De Freitas, authorities confiscated 10 kilograms heroin and a still undetermined amount of cocaine in 54 packages. Weeks later and presumably after further investigation, Campo Flores requested a public defender reportedly because Squire Patton Boggs, in attempting to comply with the Money Laundering Act of 1986 and subsequent case law, was unable to verify the legal—or clean—origin of their two-million dollar up-front retainer to represent Mr. Campo Flores.
- Squire Patton Boggs represented U.S. Ambassador Peter Romero in the Stanford Financial Group Ponzi scheme case.
- Georgian tycoon (later prime minister) Bidzina Ivanishvili was Patton Boggs's third-largest lobbying client in 2012. Patton Boggs also lobbied for ExxonMobil, Shell, Raytheon and Goldman Sachs around the same time.
- in 2016, Squire Patton Boggs signed with Saud al-Qahtani to be paid $100,000 per month, plus expenses, for "legal and strategic policy advice and advocacy on foreign policy and related issues in the U.S. Government".
- In February 2021 a White House report into the abduction and murder of Washington Post journalist Jamal Khashoggi in Istanbul on 2 October 2018 implicated "The Center for Studies and Media Affairs at the Saudi Royal Court", headed at that time by Saud al-Qahtani. After the launch of a campaign by DAWN (the advocacy group founded by Khashoggi) Squire Patton Boggs ended its contract to provide legal services to the "Center" on 17 September 2021.
- Squire Patton Boggs were donors to Trump hardliner Paul Gosar, the congressman from Arizona, who tweeted "Fight for Trump!" and "The time is now! Hold the line" to promote the 6 January 2021 rally which led to the violent attempt to overturn the US election results at the Capitol. Squire Patton Boggs did not withdraw funding until six days later, after the New York Times publicised the connection.
- The company received the worst grade in a scorecard assessing law firms in terms of their impact on climate change.
- In 2022, Trump's Save America political action committee paid Squire Patton Boggs almost $250,000 in legal fees.
- In March 2024, Squire Patton Boggs was sued by Dutch company R.D. Project Development for allegedly failing to pay rent on their subleased Moscow offices after opting to cease office operations during the Russian invasion of Ukraine.
- In early 2025, Squire Patton Boggs registered as a lobbyist for the Rashtriya Swayamsevak Sangh (RSS), a far-right Hindu paramilitary organisation infamous for promoting bigotry, participating in riots, and organising violence against Christians and Muslims in India. Squire Patton Boggs was reported to have received $330,000 to conduct lobbying on behalf of the RSS in the United States Senate and the House of Representatives.

== Locations ==
As of December 2019, Squire Patton Boggs has 45 offices in 20 countries on five continents. The combined firm advises a diverse mix of local and cross-border clients, from Fortune 100 and FTSE 100 corporations to emerging companies and from individuals to local and national governments.

== Notable people and alumni ==
=== Squire Patton Boggs ===
- John Boehner, former Speaker of the House of Representatives
- John Breaux, former United States Senator from Louisiana
- Thomas Hale Boggs, Jr.
- Al Cardenas, former chairman of American Conservative Union
- Joe Crowley, former United States Representative
- Bill Shuster, former United States Representative
- Jack Evans, District of Columbia Council member
- Randy Evans, former ambassador and general counsel to Speaker of the U.S. House of Representatives
- Jack Kingston, former United States Representative
- Petr Kolář, Czech diplomat
- Joseph LeBaron, American diplomat
- Trent Lott, former United States Senator
- Jim Matheson, former United States Representative
- Don McGahn, Trump Administration White House Counsel
- David Aldrich Nelson, former judge on the United States Court of Appeals for the Sixth Circuit
- Stephen T. Owens, litigator
- Vipal J. Patel, Attorney
- Kasim Reed, former Mayor of Atlanta
- Rodney Slater, former United States Secretary of Transportation
- Frank G. Wisner, American diplomat
- Miomir Žužul, Croatian diplomat and politician
- Luka Misetic, American lawyer
- Wayne Barnes, international rugby union referee

=== Squire Sanders ===
- Francis Allegra, judge on the United States Court of Federal Claims
- J. Edward Day, former United States Postmaster General
- William Louis Day, former judge on the United States District Court for the Northern District of Ohio
- Ronald J. James, former Assistant Secretary of the Army
- W. John Kenney, former Undersecretary of the Navy
- Seth Metcalf, former deputy treasurer of Ohio
- Rob Portman, United States senator from Ohio, former director of the Office of Management and Budget
- Louis Stokes, United States House of Representatives

=== Patton Boggs ===
- Nicholas Allard (born 1952), Dean and President of Brooklyn Law School
- Ron Brown, former United States Secretary of Commerce and Democratic National Committee chairman
- Timothy Chorba, former U.S. ambassador to Singapore
- Lanny Davis, special counsel to President Bill Clinton
- Benjamin Ginsberg, Republican strategist behind the 2000 presidential election Florida vote recount
- Don Johnson Jr., former member of House of Representatives and U.S. trade representative
- Darryl Nirenberg, U.S. ambassador to Romania
- Sean Parnell, former governor of Alaska
- Joseph E. Schmitz, former Defense Department Inspector General
