= New York State Common Retirement Fund =

Public pension plan for the employees of New York State government

- Type: Public pension plan
- Industry: Pension fund Investment management
- Founded: 1921; 105 years ago
- Headquarters: Albany, New York, United States
- Key people: Thomas P. DiNapoli (New York State Comptroller); Anastasia Titarchuk (Chief Investment Officer)
- AUM: ▲$207.4 Billion (March 2018)
- Website: www.osc.ny.gov/common-retirement-fund

The New York State Common Retirement Fund is a public pension plan for the employees of New York State government.

As of 2018, it was the third largest public pension plan in the nation, and held $207.4 billion in assets. These assets are overseen by the New York State Comptroller's office and are held on behalf of more than one million members of the New York State and Local Retirement Systems (NYSLRS).

As of March 31, 2018, its one-year return was 11.35%, however its 10-year return was 6.4%. In 2017, the fund was able to cover about 95% of the benefits it paid out. The fund paid out $11.45 billion in the fiscal year ending March 31, 2018.

== Organization ==
The fund is administered by the Office of the New York State Comptroller. As of 2018, the State Comptroller was Thomas P. DiNapoli. The Comptroller's office is headquartered in Albany, New York and employs more than 2,700 people with 8 regional offices and another office in New York City.

== Investment Fees ==
In its 2018 Comprehensive Annual Financial Report (CAFR), the state comptroller's office found that the pension fund spent $663.7 million on investment expenses and fees for the financial year ending March 31, 2018. Jonathan Trichter, a politician who ran for the state comptroller's office in 2018, claimed that the pension fund had historically paid out $6 billion in fees to hedge funds and private equity managers.

Some critics of the pension fund argue that the fund would achieve a better and more affordable return for its investment by investing more of its assets in passively managed ETFs, to which the fund's administrator has publicly responded by stating that investments in hedge funds provide critically needed diversity. About 77% of the fund's assets are invested in public equity and fixed-income investments, with another $17.5 billion invested in private equities.

== Socially responsible investing ==
The pension fund has made news for publicly warning companies with whom it holds investments for their private behavior. In August 2018, state comptroller DiNapoli sent a letter to McDonald's expressing concern for the welfare of the chicken used in their food products. In 2022, the New York State Comptroller's office reviewed and considered divesting from certain Russian assets in relation to the Russian invasion of Ukraine.

== Controversies ==
In 2010, former State Comptroller Alan Hevesi, who during his time in office was responsible for administering a $125 billion pension fund, confessed in court to approving a $250 million pension investment in exchange for nearly $1 million in illegal gifts. He was sentenced to one to four years in prison.
