= Steven J. Green =

American businessman and government official

12th United States Ambassador to Singapore
- In office November 18, 1997 – March 1, 2001
- President: Bill Clinton; George W. Bush
- Preceded by: Timothy Chorba
- Succeeded by: Frank Lavin

Personal details
- Born: July 17, 1945 (age 80) Philadelphia, Pennsylvania, U.S.
- Spouse: Dorothea Langhans

Steven J. Green (born 1945) is an American businessman and Honorary Consul General of the Republic of Singapore in Miami, Florida. He was the United States Ambassador to Singapore from 1997 to 2001.

== Education and family ==
Green was born in 1945 in Philadelphia, Pennsylvania. He attended the University of Miami and New York Institute of Finance. He is married to Dorothea Green (née Langhans), a former Miss New York and model whom he met at the Miss Universe pageant. He has two daughters. One is an attorney who also partakes in horseback riding and was the 1987 Junior Exhibitor Five-Gaited World Grand Champion. Green's other daughter is chairman of the Green Family Foundation.

== Career ==
=== Business ===
Green has participated in many business ventures. In the 1980s, he managed E-II Holdings, a company that had been forced into bankruptcy because of its junk bond debts. The company received an infusion of capital from Leon Black, resulting in its emergence from bankruptcy.

From 1988 to 1996, Green was chairman and CEO of Samsonite Corporation. He was also Chairman and CEO of Astrum International from 1990 to 1995. During this time, Astrum operated Samsonite as a subsidiary as well as Culligan Water. Both Samsonite and Culligan were spun off as separate publicly owned companies in 1995.

As chairman of Astrum, Green directed the company's expansion into emerging markets in Eastern Europe, the former Soviet Union, Asia and the Middle East. In 1992, he was chairman and CEO when the company opened the first American retailing store in Red Square, Moscow.

=== Public service ===
President Clinton appointed Green to the President's Export Council in 1995.

== United States ambassador to the Republic of Singapore ==
On November 18, 1997, Green was sworn in as United States ambassador to Singapore, a position that he would hold until March 1, 2001. A political appointee of President Bill Clinton, he stayed on as ambassador during the early days of the administration of President George W. Bush.

Green spearheaded a number of strategic programs that bilateral relations economic development, intellectual property, immigration and national security. He directly led the effort to start bilateral negotiations which culminated in the US-Singapore Free Trade Agreement.

== Career after being ambassador ==
=== Honorary consul general of Singapore, Miami, Florida ===
In 2002, Green was appointed Honorary Consul General of Singapore in Miami. The Honorary Consulate General in Miami refers consular and visa applications to the Singaporean embassy in Washington.

=== Business career after ambassadorship ===
Green is currently managing director, Greenstreet Partners, a private merchant bank. Previously he was chairman and CEO of Greenstreet Partners, Auburndale Properties, and the CEENIS Property Fund.

== Charities and board membership ==
=== Trustee ===
- Children’s Health Fund
- Florida International University
- The Scripps Research Institute
- United States Olympic Committee’s Champions in Life program
- United Way

=== Board member ===
- Greenstreet Real Estate Partners, a company that manages education-related real estate
- Knowledge Universe Holdings, KLC Knowledge Learning Centers
- Pacific Council on International Policy
- United States Chamber of Commerce
- University of Miami

=== Green Family Foundation ===
Green established the Green Family Foundation in 1991. The foundation supports HIV/AIDS prevention and education, access to the arts, homeless assistance, disaster relief, and community outreach. Green's daughter, Kimberly, is the chair of the foundation.

=== Philanthropy ===
In 2015, Green, his wife Dorothea, daughter Kimberly Green and the Green Family Foundation, made a $20 million donation to Florida International University (FIU). In honor of the donation, the university renamed its School of International and Public Affairs to the Steven J. Green School of International and Public Affairs. In furtherance of the Green Family’s commitment, FIU has also renamed its Latin American and Caribbean Center to the Kimberly Green Latin American and Caribbean Center and established the Kimberly Green Scholarship and Dorothea Green Lecture Series Fund.

Green and his wife have maintained a long association with Florida International University, supporting the institution for nearly 25 years. Prior donations from the Green family have resulted in the naming of the university's library as the Steve and Dorothea Green Library, and contributions to the Frost Art Museum, including the establishment of an art lecture series and support for the Digital Library of the Caribbean. The family also funded the Green Family Foundation NeighborhoodHELP program within the Herbert Wertheim College of Medicine, which places medical students with underserved families throughout Miami-Dade County.

== Awards ==
- American Red Cross Philos Award for a $1 million donation to the Red Cross of Greater Miami & the Keys, 1999.
- The United Way Alexis de Tocqueville Award for Outstanding Philanthropy

Diplomatic posts
| Preceded by Timothy Chorba | United States Ambassador to Singapore; 1998–2001 | Succeeded by Frank Lavin |
