= Teacher Retirement System of Texas =

Public pension plan

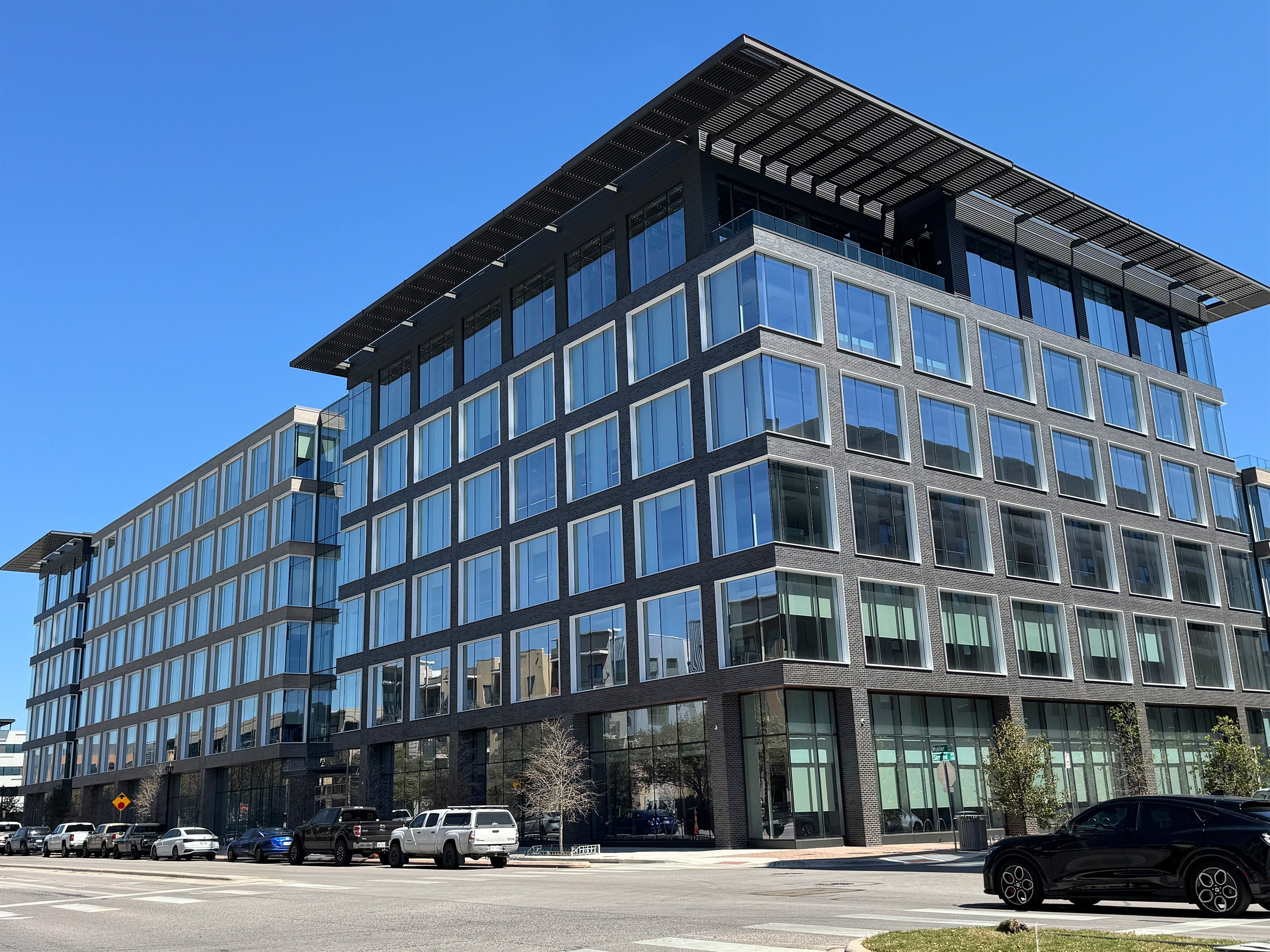
- TRS of Texas headquarters, Austin, TX

Agency overview
- Formed: 1937
- Type: Teacher Retirement System
- Jurisdiction: Texas
- Headquarters: 4655 Mueller Blvd Austin, Texas
- Employees: 1,300 FTEs [FY 2026]
- Annual budget: $385.3 million USD (FY 2026)
- Agency executives: Brian Guthrie, Executive Director; Caasi Lamb, Deputy Director
- Key document: Section 67, Article XVI Texas Constitution
- Website: https://www.trs.texas.gov/

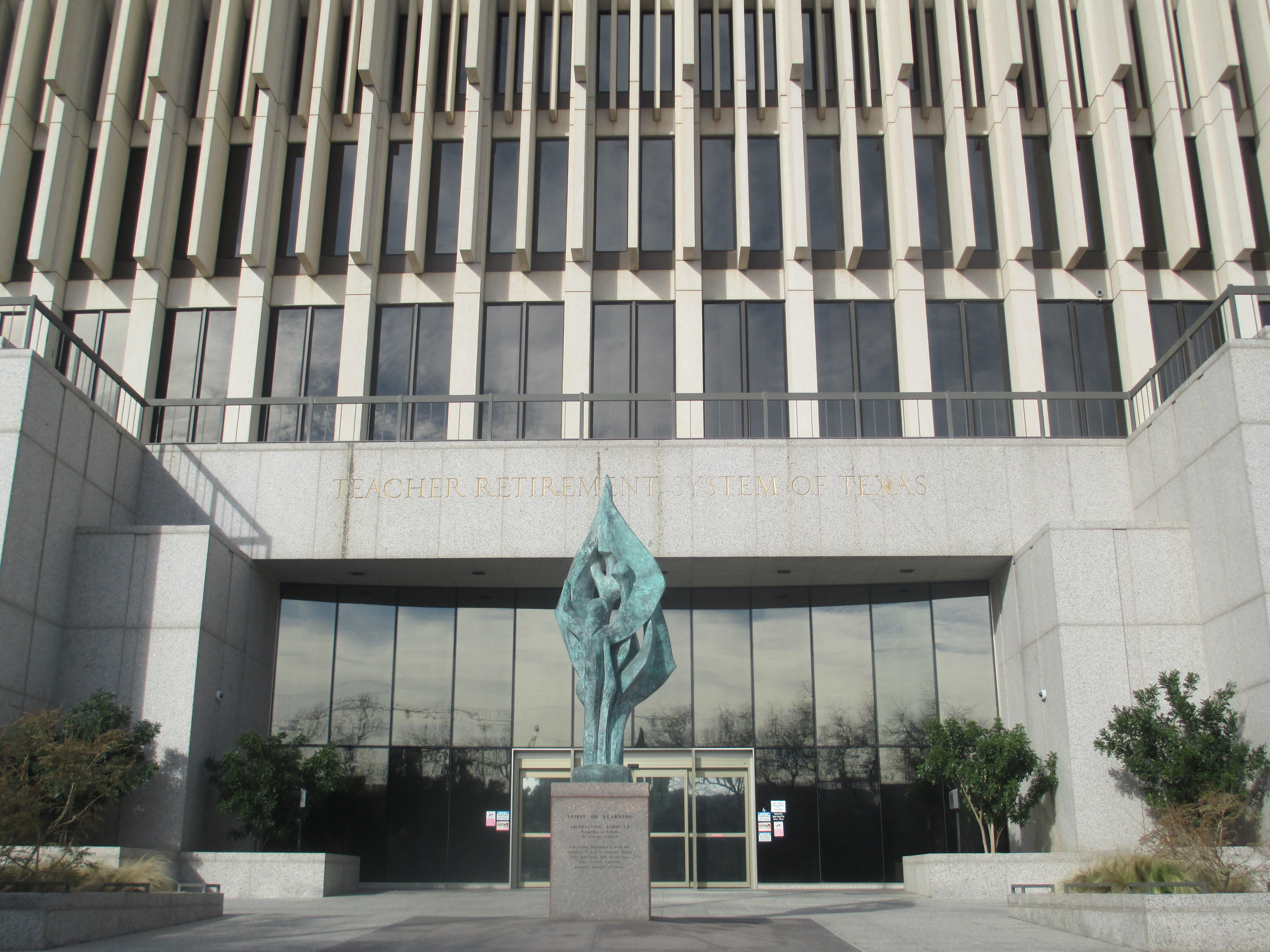
The entrance to the former TRS building on Red River Street in Austin (1973-2025)

Teacher Retirement System of Texas (TRS) is a public pension plan of the State of Texas. Established in 1937, TRS provides retirement and related benefits for those employed by the public schools, colleges, and universities supported by the State of Texas and manages a ~$225 billion trust fund established to help finance member benefits long term.

More than 2.1 million public education and higher education employees and retirees and their beneficiaries participate in the system. TRS is the largest public retirement system in Texas in both membership and assets and the sixth largest public pension fund in America. The agency is headquartered at 4655 Mueller Blvd in the capital city of Austin.

A Board of Trustees governs the retirement system. The Executive Director is Brian Guthrie. The administrative operating budget for FY 2026 was $385.3 million USD.

== History ==
The effort to establish the Teacher Retirement System of Texas was a 20-year process which began in 1916, with leadership provided by the Texas State Teachers Association (TSTA). TSTA was the only major organization for Texas teachers in that era. The struggle culminated in three final steps: (1) Passage by the 1935 Legislature of a joint resolution which put a proposed constitutional amendment on the ballot for voters in November 1936; (2) voter approval of the constitutional amendment authorizing the Legislature to pass a law setting up the system; and (3) legislative enactment in 1937 of the "enabling legislation" which put the constitutional amendment into action. Governor James V. Allred signed the bill into law on June 9, 1937 and the Teacher Retirement System of Texas was in effect as of July 1, 1937. The system is established and operates under Section 67, Article XVI of the Texas Constitution.

== Member, beneficiary, and fiduciary services ==
=== Primary functions ===
TRS of Texas serves active and retired public and higher education employees across Texas.The defined benefit pension plan administers service and disability retirement benefits, death and survivor benefits, health benefit programs, and long-term care insurance. It also manages a pension trust fund for the benefit of its members. The TRS trust fund is the largest public pension fund in the state and the sixth largest overall in the nation, based on asset size ($225 billion at the end of FY 2025). The fund is established through contributions from the State of Texas and members' employers (approximately 19.5%), TRS members themselves (approximately 18.5%) and investment returns (approximately 62%) (percentages as of Oct. 2024).

=== Benefit programs ===
- TRS administers a defined benefit retirement plan that is a qualified pension trust under Section 401(a) of the Internal Revenue Code. The pension trust fund provides service and disability retirement, as well as death and survivor benefits, to eligible Texas public education employees and their beneficiaries.
- Retirement benefits are financed by member and state contributions, employer contributions in some circumstances, and through investment earnings of the pension trust fund.
- TRS administers TRS-ActiveCare, a statewide health benefit program for eligible public education employees of participating entities. It is financed by plan participant premium payments and investment income.
- In addition, TRS administers a separate trust that provides health benefit coverage for TRS retirees and eligible dependents. This program is financed by contributions from the state, active public school employees, reporting entities, premium payments from plan participants, and investment income.
- TRS also administers an optional long-term care insurance program for eligible retirees and public school employees. Certain family members are also eligible. The plan is available on an enrollee-pay-all basis.

=== Health care for public education employees ===
On September 1, 2002, TRS introduced TRS-ActiveCare, a new statewide health coverage program for public education employees established by the 77th Texas Legislature. Participation in that program has grown to over 445,969 employees and dependents. Of the 1,246 districts/entities eligible to participate in TRS-ActiveCare, over 88.9 percent, or 1,108 now do so.

=== Health care for retirees ===
TRS-Care is the group retiree health benefits program administered by TRS. TRS retirees who are not eligible for ERS, UT, or Texas A&M system health benefit coverage may be eligible for TRS-Care. In 2025, TRS introduced Vision and Dental benefits for its retirees.TRS-Care is currently funded on a pay-as-you-go basis and is subject to change based on available funding. At the inception of the plan in fiscal year 1986, funding was projected to last ten years through fiscal year 1995. The original funding was sufficient to maintain the solvency of the fund through fiscal year 2000. Since that time, the appropriations and contributions have been established to be sufficient to provide benefits for the biennium. The Texas Legislature determines the funding of benefits and has no continuing obligation to provide benefits beyond each fiscal year.

== Cost-of-living adjustments (COLAs) and stipends ==
Unlike Social Security, which offered Cost of Living Allowances from 1975 through 2009 and again from 2013 through 2015, TRS had not been able to provide a COLA to its annuitants since 2001.

=== 2008 COLA ===
In January, 2008, TRS issued a one-time "13th" check to approximately 245,000 eligible retirees. Eligible annuitants who retired on or before December 31, 2006 received an extra amount equal to their normal monthly pension payment (up to a maximum of $2,400). TRS issued the payment without any increase to the active member contribution rate. It was the first time that such an extra annuity payment has been issued by the System and made possible by passage of Senate Bill 1846, sponsored by Senator Robert L. Duncan of Lubbock and Representative Vicki Truitt of Southlake. More than $372 million was paid to eligible retirees through these supplemental checks.

=== 2013 COLA ===
In May 2013, during the regular session of the 83rd Texas Legislature, provisions in Senate Bill 1458 resulted in the pension fund being actuarially sound. That soundness and other provisions of the bill allowed legislators to direct TRS to provide a benefit enhancement—a 3% COLA (capped at $100) for members who retired before August 31, 2004. A total of 195,000 retirees received the COLA which began with the annuity payable for September 2013.

=== 2024 COLA and one-time stipends ===
The 88th Texas Legislative Regular Session concluded May 29, 2023 with approval of retiree benefit enhancements incliuding one-time 2024 cost-of-living adjustments and one-time 2024 stipends. More than 400,000 eligible annuitants had their payments adjusted, for a total increase in benefit payments of over $30 million. Funding for the one-time 2024 COLA was provided by the 88th Texas Legislature to protect the health of the pension trust fund.

== Legislative hearing note ==
In February 2020, Senator John Whitmire called out TRS' real estate investment practices, days after he lambasted TRS over its aborted plan to lease office space in the luxury Indeed Tower high-rise under construction in downtown Austin. In July 2021, TRS exited its pending lease agreement when the building was sold. No improper investment practices were determined.
