= Oregon Public Employees Retirement System =

U.S. public employee retirement and disability fund

State of Oregon Public Employees Retirement System
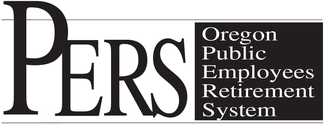

Agency overview
- Formed: July 1, 1946
- Jurisdiction: Oregon, U.S.
- Headquarters: Tigard, Oregon
- Agency executives: Kevin Olineck, Director; John Thomas, Board of Trustees Chair
- Website: www.oregon.gov/pers/pages/index.aspx

The Public Employees Retirement System (PERS) is the retirement and disability fund for public employees in the U.S. state of Oregon. Employees of the state's government, its school districts, and local governments are eligible for coverage. PERS was established in 1946, and a health insurance plan for covered retirees was added to the program in 1987. The program is administered by a twelve-member board of trustees, appointed to three-year terms by the Governor and subject to confirmation by the Senate. The board also administers the Oregon Savings Growth Plan, a voluntary deferred compensation plan established in 1991.

As of 2024, the PERS program had 415,493 members, 166,136 of whom were retired.

== Agency ==
The Oregon PERS agency has about 440 employees. Its executives include director Kevin Olineck; deputy director Kai Turner; Chief Information Officer Jordan Masanga; Chief Operations Officer Sam Paris; Jason Stanley as Chief Compliance, Audit, and Risk Officer; and Richard Horsford as Chief Financial Officer.

== Pension benefits ==
=== Tier one ===
Public employees hired before January 1, 1996, receive the system's most generous pension benefit. Benefits under this program have been described as "expensive" and "overly generous," often entitling retired workers to lifetime monthly payments over 100% of their pre-retirement earnings. In 1979, the PERS governing board set as its goal that the system's benefits, when added to social security, shall replace 75–85% of pre-retirement earnings. Actual payments grew because of a program called "money match", which guaranteed member account returns between 5–8%, without regard to greater market performance or the health of the economy. During the 1980s and 1990s, the governing board awarded account earnings in excess of 8%, placing little or no money in reserves for eventual market downturns (such as the Great Recession) in the 2000s. Member accounts saw appreciable and consistent growth during this time, but underlying pension assets did not grow to cover the increased benefit guarantee. Career public employees who worked from 1970 to 2000 often were entitled to retirement income replacement rates greater than 130% of their pre-retirement earnings.

=== Tier two ===
If hired between January 1, 1996, and August 28, 2003, a public employee is entitled to a somewhat reduced pension benefit as a result of changes passed by the Oregon Legislative Assembly in 1995. Member account (money match) returns are not guaranteed for Tier Two employees, and the age to qualify for general service full retirement is increased from 58 to 60 years. Tier Two employees are also not eligible for an Oregon state tax remedy, whereas Tier One employees can have a certain portion of state income tax reimbursed as an incremental increase to their pension benefit. Benefits paid under this program are still considered generous and above average, normally offering income replacement rates far in excess of the PERS board's stated goal.

=== Oregon Public Service Retirement Plan ===
Sometimes referred to as "Tier Three," the Oregon Public Service Retirement Plan (OPSRP) applies to employees hired after August 29, 2003. This further reduced pension sought to bring state actuarial liabilities in line with employer contributions by raising the retirement age and by vesting benefits more slowly. Benefits under this program are considered in line with comparative government pension programs. OPSRP payouts more or less meet the replacement rate target set by the PERS board. Unlike Tier One and Tier Two public employees, OPSRP members' benefits may be calculated only on the basis of their final salary and employment length. Vesting occurs at 1.5% of final salary per year, capped at 30 years.

== Individual Account Program ==
The Individual Account Program (IAP) was created originally as a mechanism to divert member contributions away from the "money match" pension program that was partially responsible for generous benefits above the system's income replacement target. The IAP is a qualified defined contribution plan akin to a 401(k), 403(b), or 457(b). Member contributions are invested alongside pension assets and realize market gains and losses.

== Reforms ==
The pension system has been reformed by the Oregon Legislative Assembly several times. Most recently, pension reforms signed by Oregon Governor John Kitzhaber in 2013 were challenged at, then subsequently reversed by, the Oregon Supreme Court.

=== Unfunded actuarial liability ===
As of the end of 2016, the Oregon PERS defined benefit program expected its promised benefits to exceed then-current assets by US$19.9 billion. By the end of 2018, the same unfunded actuarial liability (UAL) had grown to at least $26.6 billion.

== Oregon Savings Growth Plan ==
The State of Oregon 457(b) Deferred Compensation Plan, known as the Oregon Savings Growth Plan (or OSGP), is provided to state and other eligible public sector employees as a supplement to the defined benefit (pension) mandatory to all PERS participants. It is designed to "bridge the gap" between the participant's income before and after retirement. Contributions to the plan are made by payroll deduction by participating employers to accounts that are recordkept by Voya Financial. Assets may be invested in a number of core plan options, or swept to a self-directed brokerage account for broader investment choice. The plan allows Roth and pre-tax contributions, as well as rollover contributions from qualified retirement plans and accounts, including the Oregon PERS Individual Account Program (IAP).

As of October 2017, total assets of the DC plan were approximately 2.1 billion USD, with about 29,000 participants.

== See also ==
- CalPERS
- Canada Pension Plan
- Economy of Oregon
- Pensions in the United States
- Public employee pension plans in the United States
- Retirement plans in the United States

== Sources ==
- "Oregon Public Employees Retirement System – Present Duties". Oregon Blue Book (Online). Salem, Oregon: Oregon Secretary of State. 2011.
- "Public Employees Retirement System – Agency History". Oregon Blue Book (Online). Salem, Oregon: Oregon Secretary of State. 2011.
