= Pennsylvania State Employees' Retirement System =

Pennsylvania State Employees’ Retirement System
- Founded: 1923
- Headquarters: 30 North Third Street; Harrisburg, Pennsylvania
- Total assets: $34.5 billion (2020)
- Website: http://sers.pa.gov

The Pennsylvania State Employees’ Retirement System (also known as SERS or Pen SERS) is an independent administrative board of the Commonwealth of Pennsylvania that manages the public pension system for state employees in Pennsylvania.

One of the oldest and largest statewide retirement systems for public employees in the United States, it was founded on March 13, 1923 during the administration of Pennsylvania Governor Gifford Pinchot.

== History ==
Founded on March 13, 1923 during the first term of Pennsylvania Governor Gifford Pinchot, the Pennsylvania State Employees’ Retirement System was established as part of Pinchot's efforts to reorganize state government and strengthen the state's safety net for Pennsylvania. While eliminating a $23 million state deficit and creating a retirement system for state employees, Pinchot also created an old age pension system, settled a coal mining strike in 1923, and revised laws for the care and treatment of individuals with mental illness and developmental disabilities. Assisting Pinchot in creating the Pennsylvania State Employees’ Retirement System was Leon Henderson, who would later be referred to by newspapers as "The Paul Bunyan of Bureaucracy."

In June 1980, John V. Corrigan, a former administrator of the retirement system, pleaded guilty to twenty-six counts of forgery and twenty-six counts of theft connected with his embezzlement of $366,750 from the fund. At that time, the retirement system had 127,000 active members.

In early 1990, the Pennsylvania State Employees’ Retirement System committed to providing $5 million of the goal of Frederic J. Beste III, the president and chief executive officer of NEPA Management Corp., to raise $15 to $20 million in economic development investment funds for businesses in the northeastern Pennsylvania region. In 1992, the retirement system administered more than $12 billion in assets for more than 190,000 beneficiaries. By 1994, "Pennsylvania's state pension funds [had] the most active program of in-state investments in the country," according to the Richmond Times-Dispatch, which also noted that Pennsylvania's pension system had "committed $259.5 million to venture capital funds that invest in the state or in out-of-state companies that create jobs in Pennsylvania."

In 1997, retirement system executives faced increasing pressure to divest the system from its holdings in cigarette manufacturers, tobacco companies, and tobacco-related stock.

In 2000, the Pennsylvania State Employees’ Retirement System was documented as a co-owner of the Willow Grove Park Mall in Abington, Pennsylvania.

== Investments ==
As of February 2021 the fund held $30 billion in assets.

== See also ==
- List of Pennsylvania state agencies
