= 2-Furoyl chloride =

Names
- Preferred IUPAC name Furan-2-carbonyl chloride
- Other names 2-Furancarbonyl chloride 2-Furancarboxylic acid chloride 2-Furanoyl chloride

Identifiers
CAS Number	527-69-5
3D model (JSmol)	Interactive image
ChemSpider	13861158
ECHA InfoCard	100.007.658
EC Number	208-422-9
PubChem CID	68242
UNII	2US0DXI75S
CompTox Dashboard (EPA)	DTXSID7060176
- InChI: InChI=1S/C5H3ClO2/c6-5(7)4-2-1-3-8-4/h1-3H Key: OFTKFKYVSBNYEC-UHFFFAOYSA-N; InChI=1/C5H3ClO2/c6-5(7)4-2-1-3-8-4/h1-3H Key: OFTKFKYVSBNYEC-UHFFFAOYAN
- SMILES: C1=COC(=C1)C(=O)Cl

Properties
Chemical formula	C_{5}H_{3}ClO_{2}
Molar mass	130.53 g·mol^{−1}
Appearance	liquid
Density	1.3227 g/mL @ 20 °C
Melting point	−2 °C (28 °F; 271 K)
Boiling point	173 °C (343 °F; 446 K)

Hazards
- GHS labelling
Pictograms	(GHS05: Corrosive) (GHS07: Exclamation mark)
Signal word	Danger
Hazard statements	H302, H314
Precautionary statements	P260, P264, P270, P280, P301+P312, P301+P330+P331, P303+P361+P353, P304+P340, P305+P351+P338, P310, P321, P330, P363, P405, P501
- Except where otherwise noted, data are given for materials in their standard state (at 25 °C [77 °F], 100 kPa). Infobox references

2-Furoyl chloride is an acyl chloride of furan. It takes the form of a corrosive liquid, which is more irritating to the eyes than benzoyl chloride. 2-Furoyl chloride is a useful pharmaceutical intermediate and is used in the synthesis of mometasone furoate, an antiinflammatory prodrug used in the treatment of skin disorders, hay fever and asthma.

== Synthesis ==
2-Furoyl chloride was prepared in 1924 by Gelissen by refluxing 2-furoic acid in excess thionyl chloride on a water bath.

== Applications ==
2-Furoyl chloride has no major applications but it has been used as a chemical intermediate in the synthesis of various pharmaceuticals; examples include mometasone furoate, fluticasone furoate, diloxanide furoate, Ceftiofur (Excenel), mirfentanil, quinfamide, and diclofurime.

== See also ==
- Furfurylamine - corresponding amine
- Furfuryl alcohol - corresponding alcohol
- Furan-2-ylmethanethiol - corresponding thiol
- 2-Furoic acid - corresponding carboxylic acid
