= Furfurylamine =

Chemical compound

Names
- Preferred IUPAC name 1-(Furan-2-yl)methanamine
- Other names furfurylamine, 2-Aminomethylfuran

Identifiers
CAS Number	617-89-0
3D model (JSmol)	Interactive image
ChemSpider	3320
ECHA InfoCard	100.009.580
EC Number	210-536-9
PubChem CID	3438
UNII	86GAN59F7R
UN number	2526
CompTox Dashboard (EPA)	DTXSID6052295
- InChI: InChI=1S/C5H7NO/c6-4-5-2-1-3-7-5/h1-3H,4,6H2 Key: DDRPCXLAQZKBJP-UHFFFAOYSA-N; InChI=1/C5H7NO/c6-4-5-2-1-3-7-5/h1-3H,4,6H2 Key: DDRPCXLAQZKBJP-UHFFFAOYAX
- SMILES: o1c(ccc1)CN

Properties
Chemical formula	C_{5}H_{7}NO
Molar mass	97.117 g·mol^{−1}
Density	1.099 g/mL liquid
Melting point	−70 °C (−94 °F; 203 K)
Boiling point	145 °C (293 °F; 418 K)
Solubility in water	Soluble

Hazards
- GHS labelling
Pictograms	(GHS02: Flammable) (GHS05: Corrosive) (GHS05: Corrosive) (GHS07: Exclamation mark)
Signal word	Danger
Hazard statements	H226, H301, H302, H310, H311, H312, H314, H332
Precautionary statements	P210, P233, P240, P241, P242, P243, P260, P262, P264, P270, P271, P280, P301+P310, P301+P312, P301+P330+P331, P302+P350, P302+P352, P303+P361+P353, P304+P312, P304+P340, P305+P351+P338, P310, P312, P321, P322, P330, P361, P363, P370+P378, P403+P235, P405, P501
Flash point	37 °C (99 °F; 310 K)
- Except where otherwise noted, data are given for materials in their standard state (at 25 °C [77 °F], 100 kPa). verify (what is ?) Infobox references

Furfurylamine is an aromatic amine typically formed by the reductive amination of furfural with ammonia.

The pharmaceutical drug furtrethonium, a parasympathomimetic cholinergic, is a trimethyl ammonium derivative of furfurylamine.

Furfurylamine also has use in the synthesis of Barmastine.

== See also ==
- 2-Furonitrile - corresponding nitrile
- Furan-2-ylmethanethiol - corresponding thiol
- Furfuryl alcohol - corresponding alcohol
- 2-Furoic acid - corresponding carboxylic acid
