= 3-Bromofuran =

Names
- Preferred IUPAC name 3-Bromofuran
- Other names 3-Furyl bromide; β-Bromofuran

Identifiers
CAS Number	22037-28-1
3D model (JSmol)	Interactive image
ChemSpider	80460
ECHA InfoCard	100.040.662
PubChem CID	89164
UNII	YQ2XT7CKM5
CompTox Dashboard (EPA)	DTXSID10176508
- InChI: InChI=1S/C4H3BrO/c5-4-1-2-6-3-4/h1-3H Key: LXWLEQZDXOQZGW-UHFFFAOYSA-N; InChI=1/C4H3BrO/c5-4-1-2-6-3-4/h1-3H Key: LXWLEQZDXOQZGW-UHFFFAOYAM
- SMILES: Brc1ccoc1

Properties
Chemical formula	C_{4}H_{3}BrO
Molar mass	146.971 g·mol^{−1}
Density	1.6606 @20 °C
Boiling point	102.5 to 102.6 °C (216.5 to 216.7 °F; 375.6 to 375.8 K)
- Except where otherwise noted, data are given for materials in their standard state (at 25 °C [77 °F], 100 kPa). verify (what is ?) Infobox references

3-Bromofuran is a colorless, organic compound with the molecular formula C_{4}H_{3}BrO. A versatile intermediate product for synthesizing more complex compounds, it used in the syntheses of a variety of economically important drugs.

A liquid at room temperature, it has a similar boiling point to water (102.5-102.6 °C), but with a significantly higher density (1.6606 g/cm3 at 20 °C). While colorless when pure, it can appear light yellow when minor impurities are present. It is usually stabilized by calcium carbonate.

== Synthesis ==
3-Bromofuran was obtained in minor amounts in 1887 as a by-product in a reaction of 3-bromofuroic acid with calcium hydroxide. Four decades later, it was prepared deliberately and in higher yield. 3-bromofuran has since also been prepared from 3,4-dibromofuran via ortho-metalation with butyllithium in good yield. A synthesis of 3-bromofuran is due to Fechtel who prepared this compound via a Diels Alder-bromination-reverse Diels Alder sequence.

== Applications ==
3-Bromofuran is a useful starting material for 3-substituted furans, a structural motif widespread in chemotherapy agents, HIV drugs, type 2 diabetes treatments, drugs for osteoporosis and experimental drugs for Alzheimer's disease. For example, the total synthesis of (+)Cacospongionolide B, a sesterterpene with anti-inflammatory properties, has been accomplished using 3-bromofuran as a starting compound. It was also used to synthesize Rosefuran, a constituent chemical of the odor of the rose and an insect sex attractant. 3-bromofuran was reacted with 3,3-dimethylallyl bromide and lithium diisopropylamide, followed by reaction at with iodomethane and N-butyllithium.

The total synthesis of (−)-neothiobinupharidine, a bioactive alkaloid isolated from Nuphar pumila (the small yellow pond-lily) was accomplished in eight steps employing two moles of 3-bromofuran. Similarly, one of the steps of the total synthesis of Salvinorin A, the primary hallucinogenic compound in Salvia divinorum, a Mexican plant used by Mazatec shamans, used 3-bromofuran as a reactant.
