= Copper chromite =

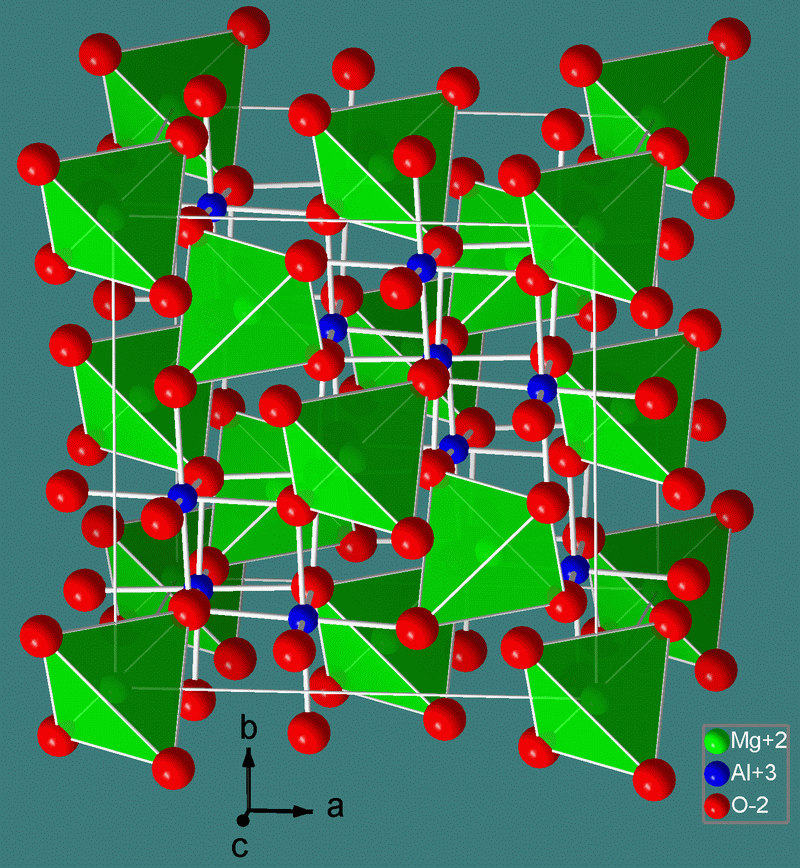

Identifiers
CAS Number	12053-18-8; CuCrO_{2}: 12017-79-7
3D model (JSmol)	Interactive image
ChemSpider	2341215; CuCrO_{2}: 57449068
ECHA InfoCard	100.031.806
EC Number	235-000-1; CuCrO_{2}: 234-627-8
PubChem CID	3084101; CuCrO_{2}: 44150493
UNII	10A808NO02
CompTox Dashboard (EPA)	DTXSID60152897
- InChI: Key: JGDFBJMWFLXCLJ-UHFFFAOYSA-N; InChI=1S/2Cr.2Cu.5O
- SMILES: O=[Cr]O[Cr]=O.O=[Cu].O=[Cu]

Properties
Chemical formula	Cu_{2}Cr_{2}O_{5}
Molar mass	311.0812 g/mol
Appearance	grey powder
Density	5.42 g/cm^{3}

Hazards
- GHS labelling
Pictograms	(GHS03: Oxidizing) (GHS07: Exclamation mark)
Signal word	Danger
Hazard statements	H272, H319, H335
Precautionary statements	P210, P220, P261, P264+P265, P271, P280, P304+P340, P305+P351+P338, P319, P337+P317, P370+P378, P403+P233, P405, P501
- NIOSH (US health exposure limits)
PEL (Permissible)	TWA 1 mg/m^{3} (as Cu)
REL (Recommended)	TWA 1 mg/m^{3} (as Cu)
IDLH (Immediate danger)	TWA 100 mg/m^{3} (as Cu)
- Except where otherwise noted, data are given for materials in their standard state (at 25 °C [77 °F], 100 kPa). Infobox references

Copper chromite often refers to inorganic compounds with the formula Cu_{2}Cr_{2}O_{x}. They are black solids. Cu_{2}Cr_{2}O_{4} is a well-defined material. The other copper chromite often is described as Cu_{2}Cr_{2}O_{5}. It is used to catalyze reactions in organic chemistry.

== History ==
Copper chromite was first described in 1908. The catalyst was further developed by Homer Burton Adkins and Wilbur Arthur Lazier, partly based on interrogation of German chemists after World War II in relation to the Fischer–Tropsch process. For this reason it is sometimes referred to as the Adkins catalyst or the Lazier catalyst. Adkins was the first to incorporate barium into the structure, which prevents the catalyst from being reduced to an inactive form during hydrogenation reactions.

== Chemical structures ==
The stoichiometry of the Laziar or Adkins catalyst is not well defined, thus the structure of their material is not defined either.

== Production ==
Copper chromites catalyst are produced by thermal decomposition of diverse precursors. The traditional method is by the calcining of copper chromate:

2 CuCrO_{4} → 2 CuCrO_{3} + O_{2}

Copper barium ammonium chromate is the most commonly used substance for production of copper chromite. The resulting copper chromite mixture produced by this method can only be used in procedures that contain materials inert to barium, as barium is a product of the decomposition of copper barium ammonium chromate, and is thus present in the resulting mixture. The by-product copper oxide is removed using an acetic acid extraction, consisting of washing with the acid, decantation and then heat drying of the remaining solid to yield isolated copper chromite. Copper chromite is produced by the exposure of copper barium ammonium chromate to temperatures of 350-450 °C, generally by a muffle furnace:

Ba_{2}Cu_{2}(NH_{4})_{2}(CrO_{4})_{5} → CrCuO_{3} + CuO + 2 Ba + 4 H_{2}O + 4 Cr + N_{2} + 6 O_{2}

Copper ammonium chromate is also used for production of copper chromite. It is generally utilized as an alternative to the route of barium ammonium chromate for usage in chemicals reactive with barium. This can also be washed with acetic acid and dried to remove impurities. Copper chromite is produced through the exposure of copper ammonium chromate to temperatures of 350-450 °C:

Cu(NH_{4})_{2}(CrO_{4})_{2} → CrCuO_{3} + CrO + 4 H_{2}O + N_{2}

An active copper chromite catalyst which includes barium in its structure can be prepared from a solution containing barium nitrate, copper(II) nitrate, and ammonium chromate. When these compounds are mixed a resulting precipitate is formed. This solid product is then calcined at 350–400 °C to yield the catalyst:

Cu(NO_{3})_{2} + Ba(NO_{3})_{2} + (NH_{4})_{2}CrO_{4} → CuCr_{2}O_{4}·BaCr_{2}O_{4}

== Illustrative reactions ==
Conversion of dimethyl ester of sebacic acid to cyclodecanediol by acyloin condensation followed by hydrogenation using a copper chromite catalyst.

- Hydrogenolysis of ester compounds to the corresponding alcohols. This approach is useful for conversion of fatty acid esters, such as fatty acid methyl esters (FAMEs) to fatty alcohols:

RCO_{2}CH_{3} + 2 H_{2} → RCH_{2}OH + HOCH_{3}

In some cases, alkene groups are hydrogenated.

- Diethyl maleate can similarly be hydrogenated to either butyrolactone or 1,4-butanediol, depending on conditions.
- Sebacoin, derived from the acyloin condensation of dimethyl sebacate, is hydrogenated to 1,2-cyclodecanediol in the presence of this catalyst.
- Phenanthrene is reduced at the 9,10 position.
- Hydrogenolysis of tetrahydrofurfuryl alcohol to 1,5-pentanediol at 250–300 °C under 3300-6000 psi of H_{2}.
- Decarboxylation of α-phenylcinnamic acid to cis-stilbene.

Reactions involving hydrogen are conducted at relatively high gas pressure (135 atm) and high temperatures (150–300 °C) in a so-called hydrogenation bomb. More active catalysts, such as W-6 grade Raney nickel, also catalyze hydrogenations such as ester reductions. The latter catalyst benefits from requiring less vigorous conditions (i.e., it works at room temperature under similar hydrogenation pressures) but requires a higher ratio of catalyst to reagents.

== See also ==
- Amide reduction
