= 2-Acetylfuran =

Names
- Preferred IUPAC name 1-(Furan-2-yl)ethan-1-one
- Other names 1-(Furan-2-yl)ethanone; 1-(2-Furanyl)-ethanone; 2-Acetylfuran; Acetyl furan 2-Furyl methyl ketone

Identifiers
CAS Number	1192-62-7
3D model (JSmol)	Interactive image
ChEBI	CHEBI:59983
ChemSpider	13849
ECHA InfoCard	100.013.416
PubChem CID	14505
UNII	Q5ZRP80K02
CompTox Dashboard (EPA)	DTXSID0051601
- InChI: InChI=1S/C6H6O2/c1-5(7)6-3-2-4-8-6/h2-4H,1H3 Key: IEMMBWWQXVXBEU-UHFFFAOYSA-N; InChI=1/C6H6O2/c1-5(7)6-3-2-4-8-6/h2-4H,1H3 Key: IEMMBWWQXVXBEU-UHFFFAOYAG
- SMILES: CC(=O)C1=CC=CO1

Properties
Chemical formula	C_{6}H_{6}O_{2}
Molar mass	110.112 g·mol^{−1}
Appearance	Low melting solid
Density	1.0975 at 20 °C
Melting point	30 °C (86 °F; 303 K)
Boiling point	168 to 169 °C (334 to 336 °F; 441 to 442 K)
- Except where otherwise noted, data are given for materials in their standard state (at 25 °C [77 °F], 100 kPa). Infobox references

2-Acetylfuran is an organic compound with the formula C_{6}H_{6}O_{2}. It has a low melting point and a high boiling point. The solid melts at 30 °C and has a density of 1.0975 g/ml at 20 °C, while the normal boiling point of the liquid is 168–169 °C. 2-Acetylfuran is a useful intermediate in the synthesis of fine chemicals and pharmaceuticals, and is used in the production of the generic cephalophosphorin antibiotic cefuroxime.

== Synthesis ==
2-Acetylfuran was prepared by Ashina in 1914 via the reaction of the methyl Grignard reagent on 2-furonitrile. Modern industrial synthesis generally involves the Friedel–Crafts acylation of furan with acetic anhydride.

== Applications ==
=== Pharmaceuticals ===
A one-pot synthesis of an intermediate to the HIV integrase inhibitor S-1360 was based on the Friedel-Crafts alkylation of 2-acetylfuran with 4-fluorobenzyl chloride using zinc chloride catalyst.

Reaction of 2-acetylfuran with aqueous sodium nitrite gave 2-furanyloxoacetic acid, an intermediate to Cefuroxime, a second-generation cephalosporin antibiotic.

=== Artificial flavouring ===
This compound has a balsamic, caramellic, sweet, almond, nutty profile with recommended uses in bakery, chocolate, cocoa, coffee, nut and tomato products.

== See also ==
- Isomaltol - same core, with a hydroxy group in the 3-position
- 2-Furoic acid
