= C16H13Cl2NO4 =

The molecular formula C_{16}H_{13}Cl_{2}NO_{4} (molar mass: 354.185 g/mol, exact mass: 353.0222 u) may refer to:

- Aceclofenac
- Quinfamide
