= C6H6O2 =

The molecular formula C_{6}H_{6}O_{2} (molar mass: 110.1 g/mol) may refer to:

- 2-Acetylfuran
- Benzenediols
  - Catechol (benzene-1,2-diol)
  - Resorcinol (benzene-1,3-diol)
  - Hydroquinone (benzene-1,4-diol)
- Hexa-2,4-diyne-1,6-diol
- 5-Methylfurfural
