= Kebony =

Norwegian wood producer

- Predecessor: Wood Technologies
- Founded: 2007
- Headquarters: Skien, Norway
- Products: Wood
- Website: kebony.com

Kebony is a Norwegian wood producer, which manufactures furfurylated wood. The company has its roots in Wood Polymer Technologies (WPT), which was founded in 1996 and changed its name to Kebony in 2007. Kebony has a factory in Skien (Norway) and in Antwerp (Belgium).

== Technology ==
Kebony has developed an environmentally friendly technology, which provides an alternative to threatened and endangered tropical hardwoods, and traditional impregnated wood. In the process, a liquid byproduct of the sugar industry, furfuryl alcohol, is used to treat the wood. Using pressure, vacuum and heat treatment, the liquid transforms to furan resin and is tied together with the cell structure of the wood in order to improve the wood's abilities permanently. The woods used are FSC-certified, PEFC-certified and carry the Nordic Ecolabel "the Swan".

The technology has been described in multiple articles in media such as CNN, BBC, The Economist and Financial Times. CNBC Business has listed Kebony as one of Europe's 25 most creative companies.
