= Furfuryl alcohol =

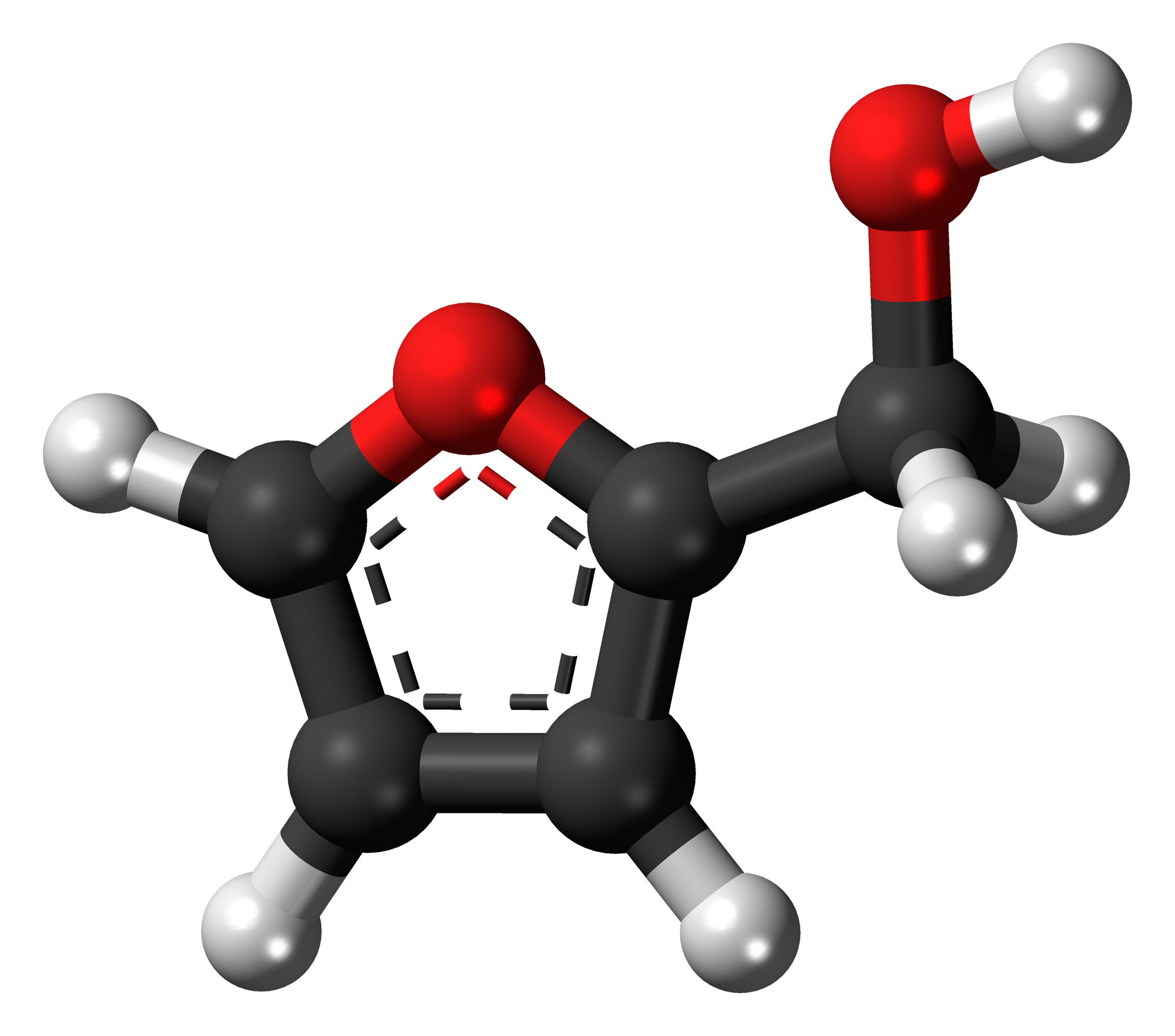

Names
- Preferred IUPAC name (Furan-2-yl)methanol
- Other names Furan-2-ylmethanol; Furfuryl alcohol 2-Furanmethanol; 2-Furancarbinol; 2-(Hydroxymethyl)furan

Identifiers
CAS Number	98-00-0
3D model (JSmol)	Interactive image
ChEBI	CHEBI:207496
ChEMBL	ChEMBL308187
ChemSpider	7083
ECHA InfoCard	100.002.388
PubChem CID	7361
UNII	D582054MUH
CompTox Dashboard (EPA)	DTXSID2025347
- InChI: InChI=1S/C5H6O2/c6-4-5-2-1-3-7-5/h1-3,6H,4H2 Key: XPFVYQJUAUNWIW-UHFFFAOYSA-N; InChI=1/C5H6O2/c6-4-5-2-1-3-7-5/h1-3,6H,4H2 Key: XPFVYQJUAUNWIW-UHFFFAOYAV
- SMILES: c1cc(oc1)CO

Properties
Chemical formula	C_{5}H_{6}O_{2}
Molar mass	98.10 g/mol
Appearance	colorless liquid
Odor	burning odor
Density	1.128 g/cm^{3}
Melting point	−29 °C (−20 °F; 244 K)
Boiling point	170 °C (338 °F; 443 K)
Solubility in water	miscible

Hazards
NFPA 704 (fire diamond)	3 2 1
Flash point	65 °C; 149 °F; 338 K
Explosive limits	1.8–16.3%
- Lethal dose or concentration (LD, LC)
LC_{50} (median concentration)	397 ppm (mouse, 6 hr); 85 ppm (rat, 6 hr); 592 ppm (rat, 1 hr)
LC_{Lo} (lowest published)	597 ppm (mouse, 6 hr)
- NIOSH (US health exposure limits)
PEL (Permissible)	TWA 50 ppm (200 mg/m^{3})
REL (Recommended)	TWA 10 ppm (40 mg/m^{3}) ST 15 ppm (60 mg/m^{3}) [skin]
IDLH (Immediate danger)	75 ppm
Safety data sheet (SDS)	External MSDS
- Except where otherwise noted, data are given for materials in their standard state (at 25 °C [77 °F], 100 kPa). verify (what is ?) Infobox references

Furfuryl alcohol is an organic compound containing a furan substituted with a hydroxymethyl group. It is a colorless liquid, but aged samples appear amber. It possesses a faint odor of burning and a bitter taste. It is miscible with but unstable in water. It is soluble in common organic solvents.

== Synthesis ==
Furfuryl alcohol is manufactured industrially by hydrogenation of furfural, which is itself typically produced from waste bio-mass such as corncobs or sugar cane bagasse. As such furfuryl alcohol may be considered a green chemical. One-pot systems have been investigated to produce furfuryl alcohol directly from xylose using solid acid catalysts.

Although hardly a pure source of the compound, the Maillard reaction produces furfuryl alcohol (among many others).

== Reactions ==
It undergoes many reactions including Diels–Alder additions to electrophilic alkenes and alkynes. Hydroxymethylation gives 1,5-bis(hydroxymethyl)furan. Hydrolysis gives levulinic acid. Upon treatment with acids, heat and/or catalysts, furfuryl alcohol can be made to polymerize into a resin, poly(furfuryl alcohol). Hydrogenation of furfuryl alcohol can proceed to give hydroxymethyl derivative of tetrahydrofuran and 1,5-pentanediol. The etherification reaction of furfuryl alcohol with alkyl or aryl halide (e.g. benzyl chloride) in the liquid-liquid-liquid triphase system with the help of a phase transfer catalyst also reported. In the Achmatowicz reaction, also known as the Achmatowicz rearrangement, furfuryl alcohol is converted to a dihydropyran.

== Applications ==
=== Resins, composites ===
The primary use of furfuryl alcohol is as a monomer for the synthesis of furan resins. These polymers are used in thermoset polymer matrix composites, cements, adhesives, coatings and casting/foundry resins. Polymerization involves an acid-catalyzed polycondensation, usually giving a black cross-linked product. A highly simplified representation is shown below.

Because of its low molecular weight, furfuryl alcohol can impregnate the cells of wood, where it can be polymerized and bonded with the wood by heat, radiation, and/or catalysts or additional reactants. The treated wood has improved moisture-dimensional stability, hardness, and decay and insect resistance; catalysts can include zinc chloride, citric, and formic acid, as well as borates.

=== Rocket fuel ===
Furfuryl alcohol has been used in rocketry as a fuel which ignites hypergolically (immediately and energetically in contact) with white fuming nitric acid or red fuming nitric acid oxidizer. The use of hypergolics avoids the need for an igniter. Mixtures of furfuryl alcohol and aniline in different proportions were used in American MGM-5 Corporal ballistic missile and WAC Corporal and Aerobee sounding rockets. Mixture of 41% of furfuryl alcohol, 41% of xylidine and 18% of methanol, called Furaline, was used in France for experimental rocket engines for aircraft, developed by SEPR.

In late 2012, Spectra, a concept liquid rocket engine using white fuming nitric acid as the oxidizer to furfuryl alcohol fuel was static tested by Copenhagen Suborbitals.

=== Flavoring ===
Furfuryl alcohol is sometimes used to impart a nutty or caramel-like flavor by the food industry.

== Safety ==
The median lethal dose for furfuryl alcohol ranges from 160 to 400 mg/kg (mouse or rabbit, oral).

== See also ==
- Furfurylamine – corresponding amine
- 2-Furonitrile – corresponding nitrile
- Furan-2-ylmethanethiol – corresponding thiol
- 2-Furoic acid – corresponding carboxylic acid
