= Furonazide =

Names
- Preferred IUPAC name N′-[1-(Furan-2-yl)ethylidene]pyridine-4-carbohydrazide
- Other names 4-Pyridinecarboxylic acid [1-(2-furanyl)ethylidene]hydrazide Furilazone; Clitizina; Menazone; FKI

Identifiers
CAS Number	3460-67-1
3D model (JSmol)	Interactive image
ChEBI	CHEBI:134941
ChemSpider	4655810
ECHA InfoCard	100.020.375
EC Number	222-411-6
PubChem CID	5338184
UNII	3OUZ124988
CompTox Dashboard (EPA)	DTXSID90876716
- InChI: InChI=1S/C12H11N3O2/c1-9(11-3-2-8-17-11)14-15-12(16)10-4-6-13-7-5-10/h2-8H,1H3,(H,15,16)/b14-9- Key: GNDPAVKYAUIVEB-ZROIWOOFSA-N
- SMILES: C/C(=N/NC(=O)c1ccncc1)/c2ccco2

Properties
Chemical formula	C_{12}H_{11}N_{3}O_{2}
Molar mass	229.239 g·mol^{−1}
Appearance	crystals
Melting point	199 to 201.5 °C (390.2 to 394.7 °F; 472.1 to 474.6 K)
- Except where otherwise noted, data are given for materials in their standard state (at 25 °C [77 °F], 100 kPa). Infobox references

Furonazide is a crystalline tuberculostatic drug substance with a reported melting point of 199-201.5 °C.

== Synthesis ==
Furonazide was first prepared in 1955 by Miyatake from isoniazid and 2-Acetylfuran by refluxing in ethanol, followed by filtration of the crystalline product.

== Applications ==
Furonazide has shown bacteriostatic action and is tuberculostatic at levels of 10^{−8} molar. The in vitro antibacterial activity of furonazide against Bacillus Calmette-Guerin was found to be essentially equal to that of isoniazid on an equimolar basis. In vivo studies in the guinea pig showed furonazide slightly more active than isoniazid as a tuberculostatic agent. The drug has relatively low toxicity. The median lethal dose (LD_{50}, rat oral) was reported as 2,600 mg/kg.
