= THFA =

THFA may refer to:

- Tetrahydrofolic acid, a folic acid derivative
- Tetrahydrofurfuryl alcohol, a colorless liquid that is used as a specialty solvent and synthetic intermediate
