= Aniline acetate test =

- Classification: Colorimetric method
- Analytes: Pentoses

The aniline acetate test is a chemical test for the presence of certain carbohydrates, in which they are converted to furfural with hydrochloric acid, which reacts with aniline acetate to produce a bright pink color. Pentoses give a strong reaction, and hexoses give a much weaker reaction.

== Procedure and mechanism ==
A dry sample is dissolved in a small volume of hydrochloric acid and briefly heated. A piece of paper, previously impregnated with aniline acetate, is exposed to the vapor from the sample solution. A bright pink color on the paper is positive for the presence of pentoses.

Furfural

Hydrochloric acid dehydrates pentoses (sugars containing five carbon atoms) to produce furfural. The reaction of furfural and aniline produces a bright pink color. Hexoses, which are sugars which contain six carbons, are not dehydrated to furfural, and so they do not produce a pink color.

== Interferences ==
3-Furanaldehyde responds to the usual tests for aldehydes, but unlike 2-furanaldehyde it gives no color test with aniline acetate.
