= Mirfentanil =

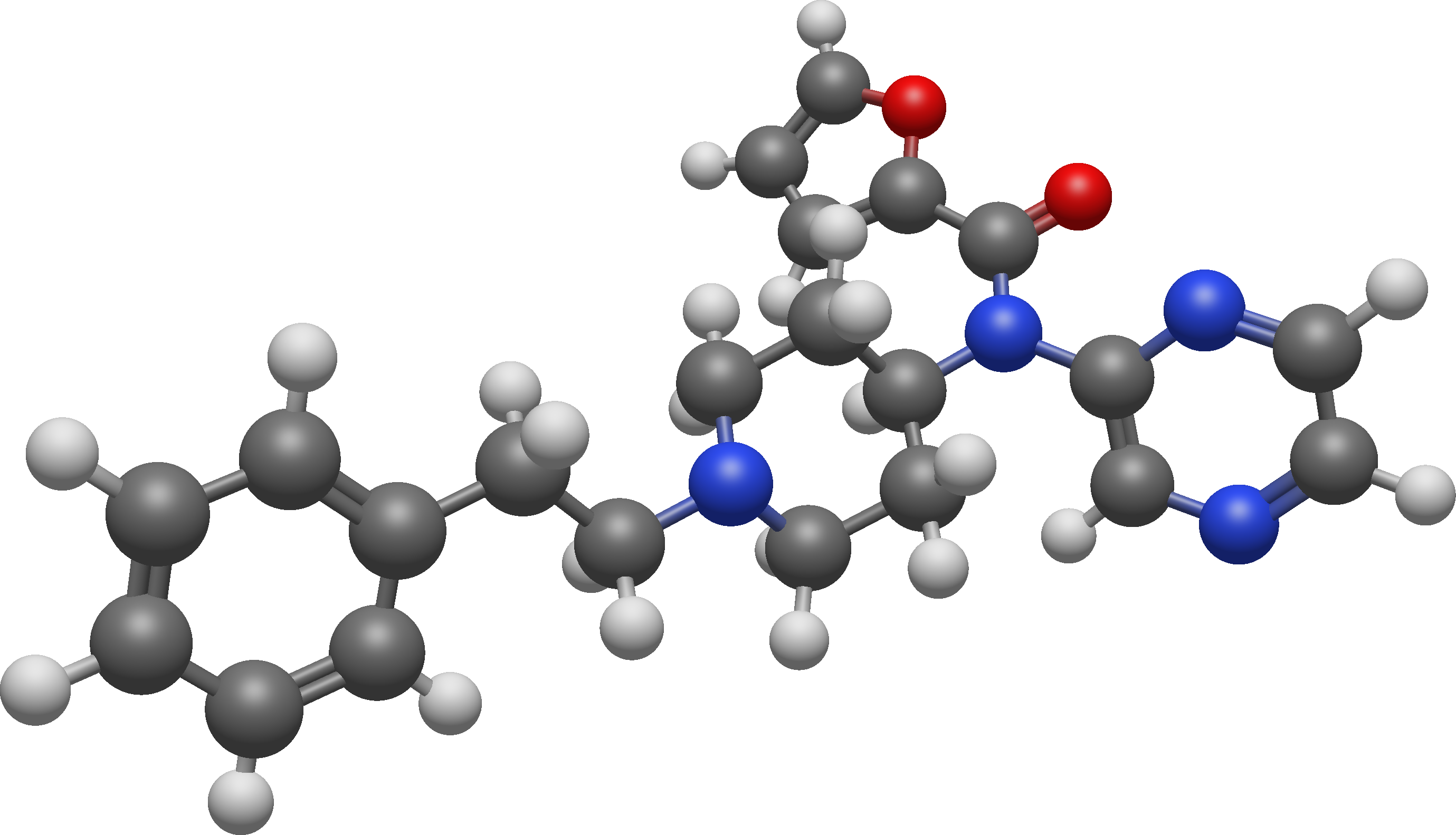

Names
- Preferred IUPAC name N-[1-(2-Phenylethyl)piperidin-4-yl]-N-pyrazinylfuran-2-carboxamide
- Other names MS-32, NIH-10647

Identifiers
CAS Number	117523-47-4
3D model (JSmol)	Interactive image
ChemSpider	54703
MeSH	C069209
PubChem CID	60698
UNII	Q2U943H24P
CompTox Dashboard (EPA)	DTXSID10151799
- InChI: InChI=1S/C22H24N4O2/c27-22(20-7-4-16-28-20)26(21-17-23-11-12-24-21)19-9-14-25(15-10-19)13-8-18-5-2-1-3-6-18/h1-7,11-12,16-17,19H,8-10,13-15H2 Key: BJZZDOLVVLWFHN-UHFFFAOYSA-N; InChI=1/C22H24N4O2/c27-22(20-7-4-16-28-20)26(21-17-23-11-12-24-21)19-9-14-25(15-10-19)13-8-18-5-2-1-3-6-18/h1-7,11-12,16-17,19H,8-10,13-15H2 Key: BJZZDOLVVLWFHN-UHFFFAOYAN
- SMILES: C1CN(CCC1N(C2=NC=CN=C2)C(=O)C3=CC=CO3)CCC4=CC=CC=C4

Properties
Chemical formula	C_{22}H_{24}N_{4}O_{2}
Molar mass	376.460 g·mol^{−1}
- Except where otherwise noted, data are given for materials in their standard state (at 25 °C [77 °F], 100 kPa). verify (what is ?) Infobox references

Mirfentanil is a fentanyl derivative with strong selectivity for the μ opioid receptor. At lower doses, it antagonizes the analgesic effects of alfentanil and substitutes for naloxone in morphine-treated monkeys; however, it also reverses naloxone-precipitated withdrawal in pigeons trained to discriminate morphine from naloxone.

At high doses, it exhibits analgesic activity which is not fully reversed by opioid antagonists, suggesting that the drug has both opioid and non-opioid mechanisms of action.

Side effects of fentanyl analogs are similar to those of fentanyl itself, which include itching, nausea and potentially serious respiratory depression, which can be life-threatening. Fentanyl analogs have killed hundreds of people throughout Europe and the former Soviet republics since the most recent resurgence in use began in Estonia in the early 2000s, and novel derivatives continue to appear.

== Synthesis ==
Mirfentanil was synthesized via acylation of the product of the reaction of 2-chloropyrazine and 1-(2-phenylethyl)-4-piperidinone oxime with 2-furoyl chloride.

== See also ==
- 3-Methylbutyrfentanyl
- 3-Methylfentanyl
- 4-Fluorofentanyl
- α-Methylfentanyl
- Acetylfentanyl
- Butyrfentanyl
- Furanylfentanyl
