= Achmatowicz reaction =

Organic synthesis

Named after	Osman Achmatowicz Jr.
Reaction type	Rearrangement reaction

Identifiers
RSC ontology ID	RXNO:0000233

The Achmatowicz reaction, also known as the Achmatowicz rearrangement or the Achmatowicz oxidation, is an organic synthesis in which a furan is converted to a dihydropyran. In the original publication by the Polish chemist Osman Achmatowicz Jr. (b. 20 December 1931 in Vilnius) in 1971 furfuryl alcohol is reacted with bromine in methanol to 2,5-dimethoxy-2,5-dihydrofuran which rearranges to the dihydropyran with dilute sulfuric acid. Additional reaction steps, alcohol protection with methyl orthoformate and boron trifluoride) and then ketone reduction with sodium borohydride produce an intermediate from which many monosaccharides can be synthesised.

The Achmatowicz protocol has been used in total synthesis, including those of desoxoprosophylline, pyrenophorin Recently it has been used in diversity oriented synthesis

and in enantiomeric scaffolding.
