= Furan fatty acids =

Group of fatty acids contain a furan ring

Furan fatty acids are a group of fatty acids that contain a furan ring. To this furan ring, an unbranched carboxylic acid and, at another position, an alkyl residue are attached. Natural furan fatty acids are mono- or di-methylated on the furan ring. Furan fatty acids can be found in a variety of plant and animal species.

Carboxy-substituted furan fatty acids are known as urofuran acids. Urofuran fatty acids are metabolic products of furan fatty acids and can be detected, for example, in human urine.

General structure of furan fatty acids General structure of furan fatty acids
The most abundant methyl-substituted furan fatty acids
m	n	R
2	8	CH_{3}
4	8	H
4	8	CH_{3}
2	10	CH_{3}
4	10	H
4	10	CH_{3}
4	12	H
4	12	CH_{3}

== Occurrence ==
Furan fatty acids are found mainly in the liver fat of fish, in crustaceans and horn corals. They can also be found in the liver of cattle and rats, as well as in human blood; either in free form or in triglycerides or esterified to cholesterol. In fish, the concentration of furan fatty acids is particularly high in the liver after hunger periods.

Furan fatty acids can be detected in a variety of organisms and products such as butter and butter oil. It is now assumed that this class of compounds is ubiquitous.

Furan fatty acids in animals are based on the uptake and accumulation of furan fatty acids from plant constituents. In human blood, the total furan fatty acid content is about 50 ng/ml. Per day, a person separates between 0.5 and 3 mg of urofuran acids - the metabolic product of the furans acids. Animals are not able to synthesize furan fatty acids. Larger amounts of furan fatty acids are produced mainly by algae, but also some plants and microorganisms. These serve fish and mammals as food. The furan fatty acids thus absorbed are incorporated into phospholipids and cholesterol esters.

== Function and physiological effects ==
The metabolism of furan fatty acids to urofuranic acids in humans. In rats and cattle, the methyl group of the alkyl group is oxidized.

Furan fatty acids are reactive compounds. They are easily oxidizable by photooxygenation, autoxidation, or catalyzed by lipoxygenase-1. Upon the exposure to light, the aroma 3-methyl-2,4-nonanedione (MND) is formed from furan fatty acids in the reaction with singlet oxygen, which has a hay-like odor and is found, for example, in green tea.

Furan fatty acids act as radical scavengers. In the example, two hydroxyl radicals are trapped to form a dioxoenoic fatty acid.

Furan fatty acids are very effectively acting as radical scavengers. In this process dioxoenoic fatty acids are formed, which are by themselves very unstable and form thioethers with thiols such as cysteine or glutathione. As potent antioxidants, they specifically trap hydroxyl radicals. It is therefore believed that this is in different biological systems their main function. They also inhibit the singlet oxygen-induced hemolysis of red blood cells (red blood cell disintegration).

Plants and algae produce furan fatty acids during the biosynthesis from polyunsaturated fatty acids (PUFA). These are seemingly used in these organisms as protection against free radicals generated by sunlight.

The biosynthesis of furan fatty acids

Occasionally it is speculated that the health-promoting properties originally attributed to omega-3 fatty acids may not be based on themself, but on the furan fatty acids also present in the fish. A clinical trial of isolated omega-3 fatty acids such as eicosapentaenoic acid (EPA) or docosahexaenoic acid (DHA) in patients who have had a myocardial infarction previously showed no significant difference in cardiovascular effects compared to a placebo.

The exact pathological effects of furan fatty acids have not yet been clarified in detail and are the subject of current research. In addition to the antioxidant effect, anti-tumor (against malignant tumors) and antithrombotic effects (anti-thrombosis) are also suspected. In 2002, xenohormonal properties were observed for the two furan fatty acids 9,(12)-oxy-10,13-dihydroxystearic acid and 10,(13)-oxy-9,12-dihydroxystearic acid. In vitro experiments on MCF-7 cells (breast cancer cells with estrogen receptor) revealed mitogenic properties as well as an influence on estrus. In the latter case, the transition to metestrus was initiated. In vivo, a reduction in mating willingness was observed after intake of furan fatty acids on female color rats. However, neither estrogen nor anti-estrogenic activity has been demonstrated. Chickens were found to have no adverse effects on feeding, fertility, egg weight, eggshell thickness, and other reproductive parameters after the intake of furan fatty acids.

== History ==
Furan fatty acids were first detected in 1966 by L. J. Morris and colleagues as part of an oil derived from seeds of Exocarpus cupressiformis (a sandalwood-type plant). Years later, other analysis methods showed that the furan fatty acid 9,12-epoxyoctadeca-9,11-dienoic acid was in fact not contained in the oil of Exocarpus cupressiformis as described by Morris. Instead, it was formed during the sample preparation used by Morries and colleagues for the argentation chromatography by oxidation of hydroxyfatty acids, in a base-catalyzed transesterification. In 1974, furan fatty acids were first identified in pike (Esox lucius) by Robert L. Glass and colleagues using coupled gas chromatography–mass spectrometry (GC-MS).

== Literature ==
- N. Hinrichsen: "Synthese und Analytik von Furanfettsäuren". Dissertation, Universität Hamburg, 2009, ISBN 3-86853-028-2
- Dembitsky, V. M.; Rezanka, T. (1996). "Furan fatty acids of some brackish invertebrates from the Caspian sea". Comparative Biochemistry and Physiology Part B: Biochemistry and Molecular Biology. 114 (3): 317–320. doi:10.1016/0305-0491(96)00063-6.
- Prinsep, MR; Blunt, JW; Munro, MH (1994). "Isolation of the furan fatty acid, (8Z,11Z,14Z,17Z)-3,6-epoxyeicos-3,5,8,11,14,17-hexenoic acid from the New Zealand sponge Hymeniacidon hauraki". J Nat Prod. 57 (11): 1557–9. doi:10.1021/np50113a014. PMID 7853004.
- Wahl, H. G. (1988). "Die Bedeutung von Furanfettsäuren als Inhaltsstoffe von Fischölpräparaten". GIT Labor-Fachzeitschrift. 4: 368–372.
- Ishii, K; Okajima, H; Okada, Y; Watanabe, H (1988). "Studies on furan fatty acids of salmon roe phospholipids". J Biochem. 103 (5): 836–9. doi:10.1093/oxfordjournals.jbchem.a122356. PMID 3182753.
- Spiteller, G. (1987). "Furanfettsäuren". Nachrichten aus Chemie, Technik und Laboratorium. 35 (12): 1240–1243. doi:10.1002/nadc.19870351204.
- Rahn, C. H.; et al. (1979). "Synthesis of naturally occurring furan fatty acids". The Journal of Organic Chemistry. 44 (19): 3420–3424. doi:10.1021/jo01333a036.
- Glass, RL; Krick, TP; Sand, DM; Rahn, CH; Schlenk, H (1975). "Furanoid fatty acids from fish lipids". Lipids. 10 (11): 695–702. doi:10.1007/bf02532763. PMID 1196019. S2CID 4052488.
- R. Jónsdóttir, P. Hamaguchi, G. Ólafsdóttir, T. Wang: "Antioxidants from Icelandic marine sources." (PDF-File; 429 kB), May 2010.
