= Nuphar × porphyranthera =

Scientific classification
- Kingdom: Plantae
- Clade: Tracheophytes
- Clade: Angiosperms
- Order: Nymphaeales
- Family: Nymphaeaceae
- Genus: Nuphar
- Species: N. × porphyranthera

Binomial name
- Nuphar × porphyranthera Lansdown & Ruhsam
- Nuphar × porphyranthera occurs in Great Britain

Hybrid of perennial aquatic plant

Nuphar × porphyranthera is a species of rhizomatous aquatic plant native to Great Britain. It is a hybrid of Nuphar lutea and Nuphar advena.

The parent species of the natural hybrid Nuphar × porphyranthera Lansdown & Ruhsam

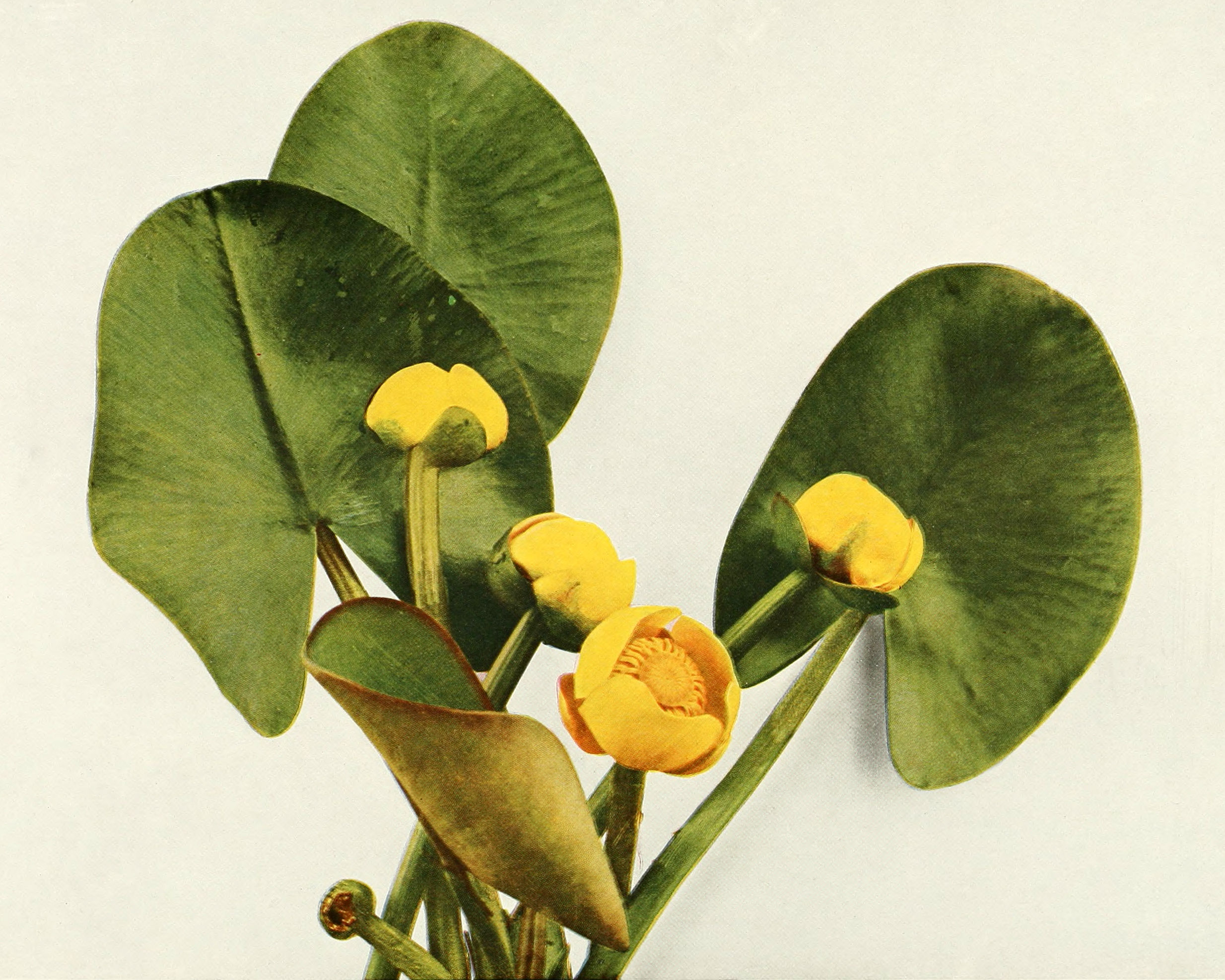
Nuphar advena (Aiton) W.T.Aiton

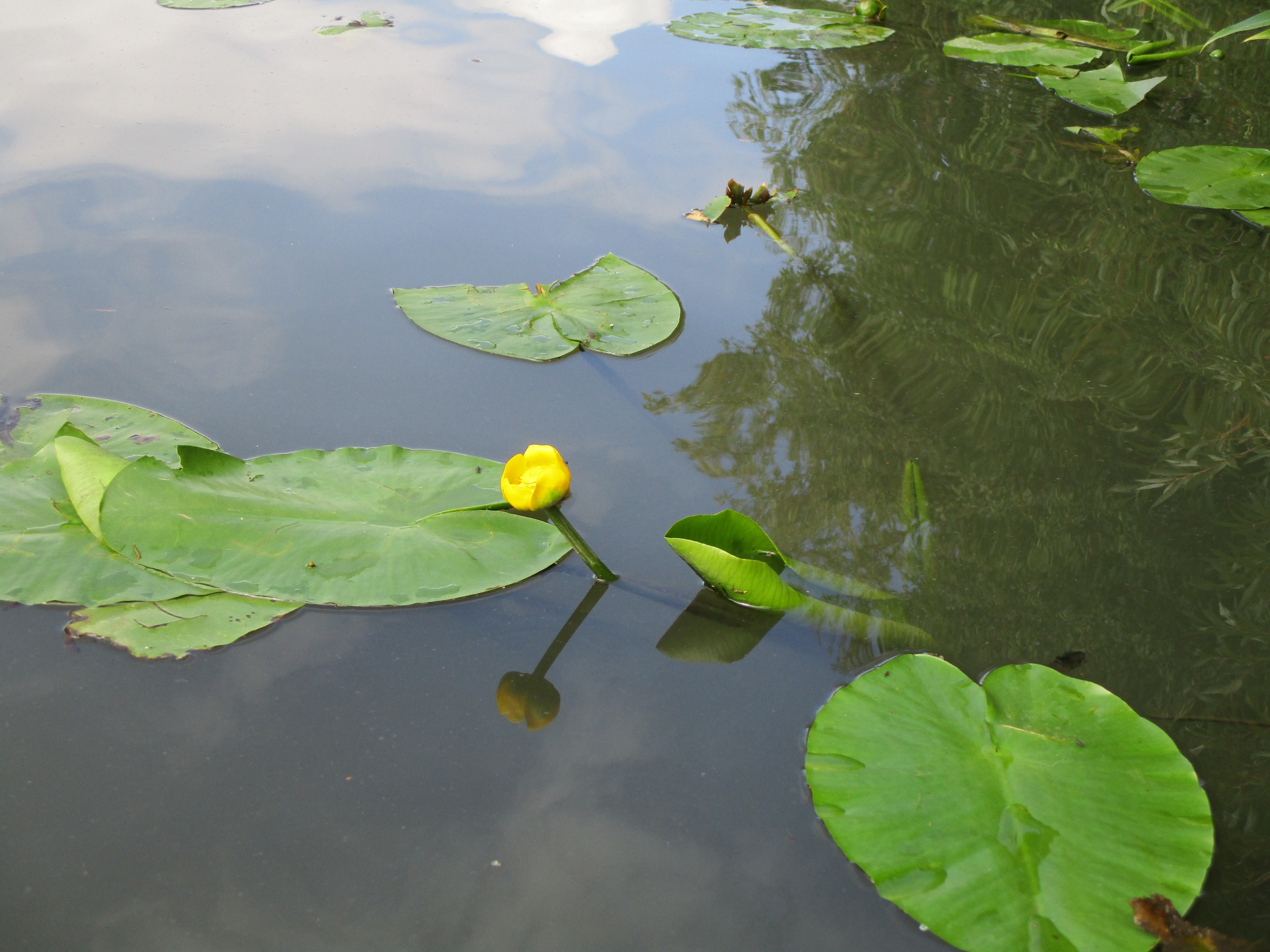
Nuphar lutea (L.) Sm.

== Description ==
=== Vegetative characteristics ===
Nuphar × porphyranthera is an aquatic plant with predominantly emerging leaves.

=== Generative characteristics ===
The flowers have 5-6 sepals. The yellow filaments are 4.1–9.9 mm long. The sterile, purple or yellow anthers are 5–11 mm long. The fruit does not develop.

== Reproduction ==
=== Generative reproduction ===
The hybrid is sterile.

== Taxonomy ==
=== Publication ===
It was first described by Lansdown & Ruhsam in 2022.

=== Natural hybridisation ===
Hybridisation occurred after introduction of the non-native Nuphar advena to Great Britain. It hybridised with the native species Nuphar lutea and formed the new hybrid Nuphar × porphyranthera.

=== Type specimen ===
The type specimen was collected from a shaded former gravel pit beneath trees in Ferry Lane, Shepperton, Middlesex, United Kingdom.

== Ecology ==
=== Habitat ===
It occurs in ornamental ponds, and in a gravel pit. It doesn't appear to spread into new habitats.
