= Furan resin =

Polymer produced from furan compounds

Formation of furan resin from furfuryl alcohol.

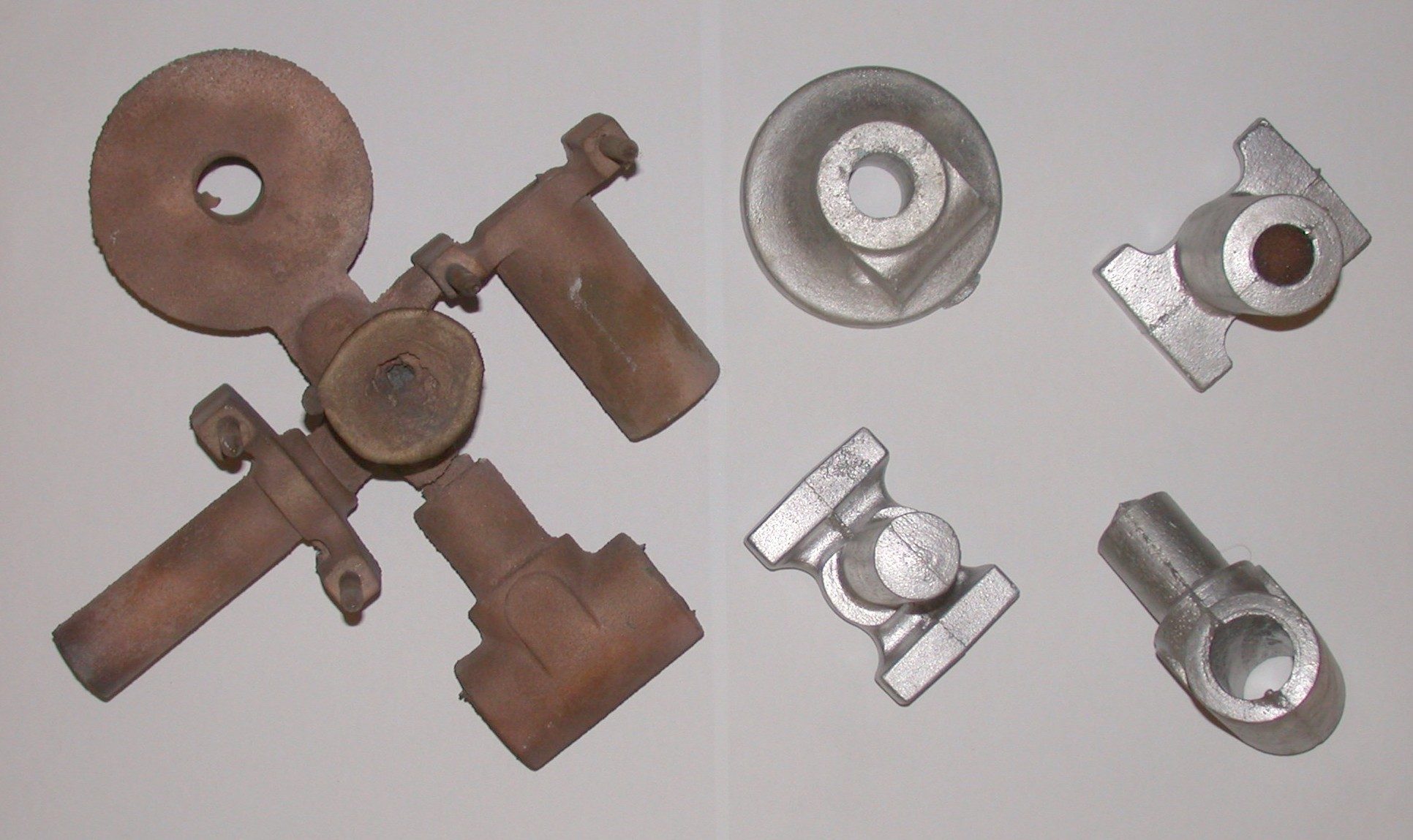
Components produced by sand casting. Furan resins serve as binders for the casting moulds.

Furan resin refers to polymers produced from various furan compounds, of which the most common starting materials are furfuryl alcohol and furfural. In the resin and in the cured polyfurfurol, the furan rings are not connected by conjugation. The resins are generally used as binders for sand castings. The furan monomer is typically converted to a free-flowing resin with mild acid catalysis. Curing is achieved using strong acid.

== Types ==
The term furan resins is not used uniformly in the literature. For example, some authors refer to resins based on furfuryl alcohol and furan as furan resins, while others use the term only for resins based on furfuryl alcohol. In addition to homopolymers of the two starting materials, also copolymers comprising for example methanal, urea or phenol are counted as furan resins. Furfurylated wood is made by impregnating wood and then forming a furan resin.

== Production ==
Furan resins based on furfuryl alcohol are produced by polycondensation under the presence of weak acids. The polycondensation leads to various linear oligomers that differ on chainlength and linking between the furan units. The linking of the furan units via methylenbridge (–CH_{2}–) is predominating but the rings can be linked via dimethylenetherbridges (–CH_{2}–O–CH_{2}–) The etherbridges are unstable especially in very acidic environment. They can be converted to methylenbridges by release of formaldehyde.

To produce a storable resin, the reaction is interrupted by the addition of sodium hydroxide. The products are brownish in colour and have a low to medium viscosity. They are stable at 40 °C for approximately 6 months. In a second step, the resins can be cured to a thermoset either at room temperature by adding acids (e.g. p-toluenesulfonic acid, phosphoric acid) or at higher temperatures by adding latent curing agents such as ammonium nitrate. The reactions involved are complex and have been studied for a long time. Segments with conjugated double bonds are proposed to lead to cross-linking.

== Properties ==
Before curing, the properties of furan resins are similar to those of other curable resins. They can be used as binders, are reactive to acids, thermally reactive and cross-linkable. Cured furan resins are resistant to attack by strong acids, bases, and halogenated hydrocarbons. They are attacked by oxidizing agents. Furan resins exhibit good thermal stability. Continuous use at 100-120 °C is routine. Some furan resins can even be used at up to 150 °C. Some grades are characterized by their low flammability and low smoke emission. They also have a high strength.
