= 2-Furonitrile =

Names
- Preferred IUPAC name Furan-2-carbonitrile
- Other names 2-Cyanofuran; 2-Furancarbonitrile; 2-Furyl cyanide

Identifiers
| CAS Number | 617-90-3 |
| 3D model (JSmol) | Interactive image |
| ChemSpider | 62458 |
| ECHA InfoCard | 100.009.581 |
| PubChem CID | 69245 |
| UNII | 2LRK86H722 |
| CompTox Dashboard (EPA) | DTXSID40210707 |
- InChI: InChI=1S/C5H3NO/c6-4-5-2-1-3-7-5/h1-3H Key: YXDXXGXWFJCXEB-UHFFFAOYSA-N; InChI=1/C5H3NO/c6-4-5-2-1-3-7-5/h1-3H Key: YXDXXGXWFJCXEB-UHFFFAOYAE
- SMILES: N#Cc1occc1

Properties
| Chemical formula | C_{5}H_{3}NO |
| Molar mass | 93.085 g·mol^{−1} |
| Appearance | colorless liquid (yellow if impure) |
| Density | 1.0650 @20 °C |
| Boiling point | 147 °C (297 °F; 420 K) |

Hazards
| Flash point | 35 °C; 95 °F; 308 K |
- Except where otherwise noted, data are given for materials in their standard state (at 25 °C [77 °F], 100 kPa). verify (what is ?) Infobox references

2-Furonitrile is a colorless derivative of furan possessing a nitrile group.

== Synthesis ==
Industrial synthesis is based on the vapor phase ammoxidation of furfural with ammonia over bismuth molybdate catalyst at 440–480 °C.

Numerous laboratory methods also exist; for the instance oxidative dehydration of furfural with ammonia salts using hypervalent iodine reagents or n-bromosuccinimide. From furfural aldoxime (with thionyl chloride-benzotriazole, triphenylphosphine-iodine reagents, or heating in DMSO) and furoic acid amide (flash vacuum pyrolysis).

== Applications ==
2-Furonitrile currently has no major applications but it is used as an intermediate in pharmaceutical and fine chemical synthesis. It has been suggested as a potential sweetening agent, as it has about 30 times the sweetening power of sucrose.
