= Quinfamide =

Chemical compound with anti-parasitic properties

Clinical data
- Routes of administration: Oral
- ATC code: None

Identifiers
- IUPAC name: [1-(2,2-dichloroacetyl)-3,4-dihydro-2H-quinolin-6-yl] furan-2-carboxylate
- CAS Number: 62265-68-3
- PubChem CID: 71743
- ChemSpider: 64787
- UNII: O1ZB1046R1
- KEGG: D00641
- CompTox Dashboard (EPA): DTXSID90211320
- ECHA InfoCard: 100.057.690

Chemical and physical data
- Formula: C_{16}H_{13}Cl_{2}NO_{4}
- Molar mass: 354.18 g·mol^{−1}
- 3D model (JSmol): Interactive image
- SMILES: C1CC2=C(C=CC(=C2)OC(=O)C3=CC=CO3)N(C1)C(=O)C(Cl)Cl
- InChI: InChI=1S/C16H13Cl2NO4/c17-14(18)15(20)19-7-1-3-10-9-11(5-6-12(10)19)23-16(21)13-4-2-8-22-13/h2,4-6,8-9,14H,1,3,7H2; Key:SBJGFIXQRZOVTO-UHFFFAOYSA-N

Quinfamide is a drug that has anti-parasitic properties.

== Synthesis ==
Quinfamide is one of a relatively small family of antiamoebic compounds containing a dichloroacetamide function.

Quinfamide synthesis:

The synthesis begins by amidation of 6-hydroxytetrahydroquinoline with dichloroacetyl chloride. The sequence is completed by acylation with 2-furoyl chloride.
