= 1,5-Pentanediol =

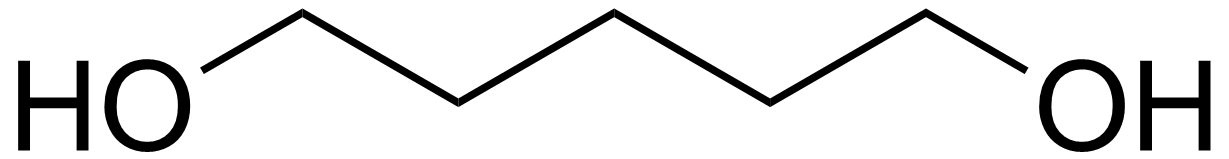

Names
- Preferred IUPAC name Pentane-1,5-diol
- Other names Pentamethylene glycol 1,5-Dihydroxypentane

Identifiers
CAS Number	111-29-5
3D model (JSmol)	Interactive image
ChEMBL	ChEMBL448289
ChemSpider	13839441
ECHA InfoCard	100.003.505
EC Number	203-854-4
PubChem CID	8105
UNII	07UXZ0SCST
CompTox Dashboard (EPA)	DTXSID2041256
- InChI: InChI=1S/C5H12O2/c6-4-2-1-3-5-7/h6-7H,1-5H2 Key: ALQSHHUCVQOPAS-UHFFFAOYSA-N; InChI=1/C5H12O2/c6-4-2-1-3-5-7/h6-7H,1-5H2 Key: ALQSHHUCVQOPAS-UHFFFAOYAE
- SMILES: OCCCCCO

Properties
Chemical formula	C_{5}H_{12}O_{2}
Molar mass	104.14758
Density	0.994 g/mL at 25 °C
Melting point	−18 °C (0 °F; 255 K)
Boiling point	242 °C (468 °F; 515 K)
Solubility in water	Miscible

Hazards
- GHS labelling
Pictograms	(GHS07: Exclamation mark)
Signal word	Warning
Hazard statements	H302
Precautionary statements	P261, P264, P264+P265, P270, P271, P280, P301+P317, P302+P352, P304+P340, P305+P351+P338, P319, P321, P330, P332+P317, P337+P317, P362+P364, P403+P233, P405, P501
NFPA 704 (fire diamond)	2 1 0
- Except where otherwise noted, data are given for materials in their standard state (at 25 °C [77 °F], 100 kPa). verify (what is ?) Infobox references

1,5-Pentanediol is the organic compound with the formula HO(CH_{2})_{5}OH. Like other diols, this viscous, colorless liquid is used as a plasticizer and also forms polyesters, which are used as emulsifying agents and resin intermediates.

== Synthesis and reactions ==
1,5-Pentanediol is produced by hydrogenation of glutaric acid and its derivatives. It can also be prepared by hydrogenolysis of tetrahydrofurfuryl alcohol. 1,4-Pentadiene can be prepared from 1,5-pentadiol via the diacetate.

== Contamination of Bindeez ==
A toy called Bindeez (Aqua Dots in North America) was recalled by the distributor in November 2007 due to the unauthorized substitution of 1,5-pentanediol with 1,4-butanediol. The toy consists of small beads that stick to each other when sprinkled with water. 1,4-Butanediol, which when ingested is metabolized to gamma-hydroxybutyric acid, was detected by GC-MS. ChemNet China lists the price of 1,4-butanediol at between US$1,350–2,800/tonne, while the price for 1,5-pentanediol is about US$9,700/tonne.
