= Rosefuran =

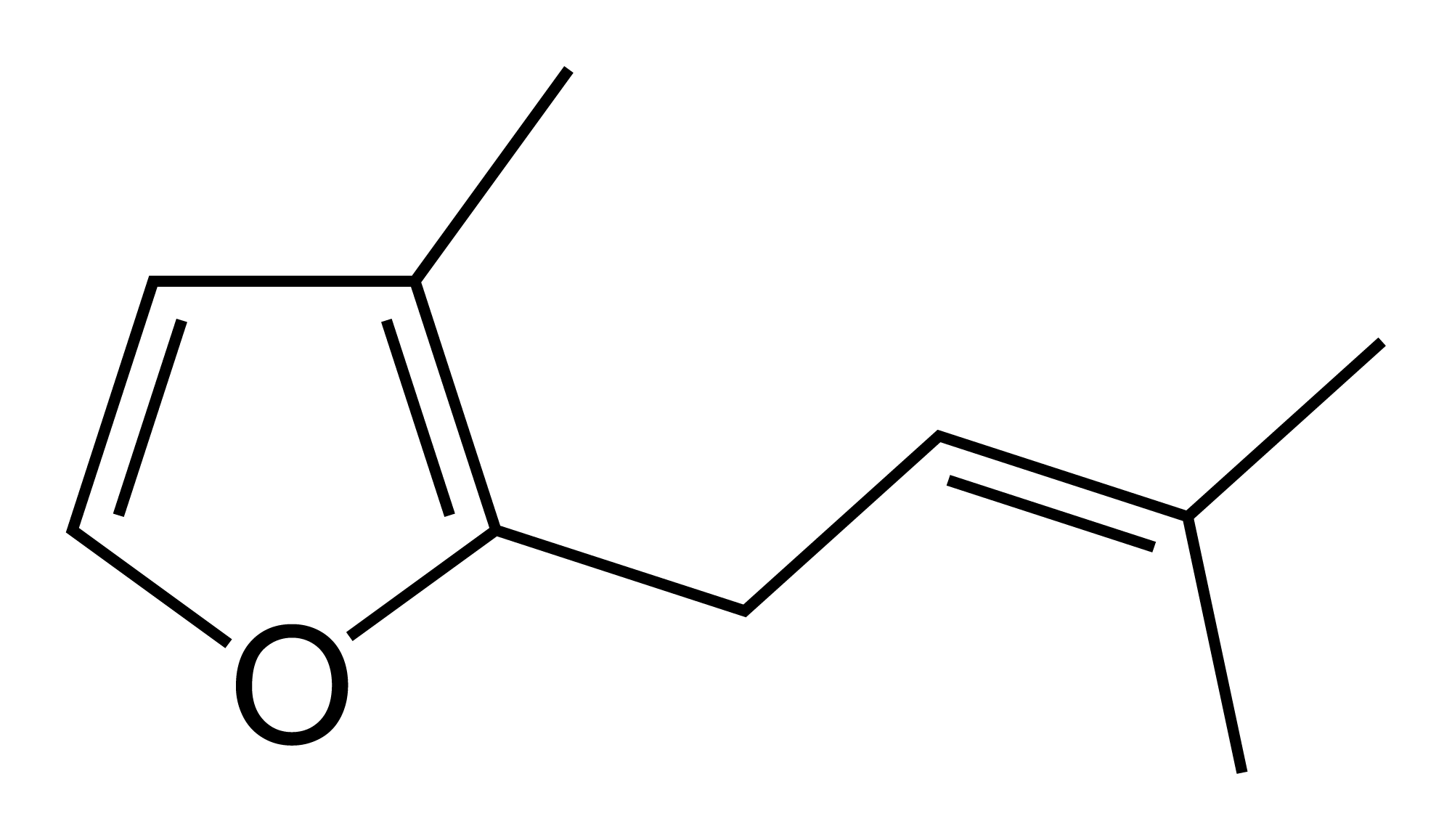

Names
- Preferred IUPAC name 3-Methyl-2-(3-methylbut-2-en-1-yl)furan
- Other names 3-methyl-2-prenylfuran; 2-(3-Methyl-2-butenyl)-3-methylfuran

Identifiers
CAS Number	15186-51-3
3D model (JSmol)	Interactive image
ChemSpider	76521
PubChem CID	84825
UNII	PNC9VDU98G
CompTox Dashboard (EPA)	DTXSID9065865
- InChI: InChI=1S/C10H14O/c1-8(2)4-5-10-9(3)6-7-11-10/h4,6-7H,5H2,1-3H3 Key: UTSGPHXOHJSDBC-UHFFFAOYSA-N; InChI=1/C10H14O/c1-8(2)4-5-10-9(3)6-7-11-10/h4,6-7H,5H2,1-3H3 Key: UTSGPHXOHJSDBC-UHFFFAOYAR
- SMILES: o1c(c(cc1)C)C\C=C(/C)C

Properties
Chemical formula	C_{10}H_{14}O
Molar mass	150.221 g·mol^{−1}
Appearance	colorless liquid
Density	0.9089 @30 °C
Boiling point	103 to 104 °C (217 to 219 °F; 376 to 377 K) at 50 mmHg

Hazards
Flash point	62.22 °C; 144.00 °F; 335.37 K
- Except where otherwise noted, data are given for materials in their standard state (at 25 °C [77 °F], 100 kPa). verify (what is ?) Infobox references

Rosefuran (3-methyl-2-prenylfuran) is an organic compound, classified as a terpenoid. It is a minor constituent of the aroma of the rose (Rosa damascene). Rosefuran is a 2,3-disubstituted furan (3-methyl-2-(3-methyl-2-buten-1-yl)furan). It has an odor threshold of 200 ppb and constitutes 0.16% of Bulgarian rose oil. Rosefuran has been established as a female sex pheromone of an acarid mite, Caloglyphus sp. Concentrations of less than 100 ng of synthetic rosefuran caused sexual excitation in males of the species.

== Synthesis ==
Rosefuran was synthesized in 1968 by George Büchi via the organomercury compound bis(3-methyl-2-furyl)mercury. Rosefuran has been synthesized in many steps from common starting materials starting with prenyl chloride (3-methyl-but-2-en-1-yl chloride). Rosefuran has also been synthesized via cyclization of suitable acyclic precursors, such as, 5-oxogeraniol and 5-hydroxycitral (4-hydoxy-3,7-dimethyl-(E)-2,6-octadienol). Rosefuran has also been prepared via palladium catalyzed cross coupling of the methyl ester of 4-bromo-5-methyl-2-furancarboxylic acid followed by decarboxylation.

Alternatively, rosefuran has been prepared from other furan derivatives. Thus, Wittig reaction of 3-methyl-2-furanacetaldehyde with triphenylphosphonium isopropylide gave rosefuran in 67% yield. The aldehyde was obtained via Claisen rearrangement of 3-(vinyloxymethyl)furan. Similarly, the readily available 3-bromofuran was reacted with 3,3-dimethylallyl bromide and lithium diisopropylamide in THF solution, followed by reaction at with methyl iodide and N-butyllithium in THF, yielding rosefuran.

A patented process for the manufacture of rosefuran via condensation of 3-formylpropionic acid methyl ester with crotonaldehyde has been described. The intermediate ketoaldehyde is cyclized to a furan derivative which is converted to rosefuran in 33% overall yield via Grignard reaction to give 2-methyl-4-(3-methyl-2-furanyl)-2-butanol followed by dehydration.

== Applications ==
Rosefuran is a desirable component of rose oil, a natural fragrance material. Rosefuran is the major constituent (58% by weight) of the essential oil of Perilla ocimoides, a herbaceous, annual plant cultivated in Bangladesh and used as a component of a common spice. Additionally, synthetic rosefuran is recommended (average recommended level in parentheses) for use as a flavor, fragrance chemical for a wide variety of applications including baked goods (5 ppm), breakfast cereal (2 ppm), cheese (3 ppm), condiments (2 ppm), frozen dairy (3 ppm), soups (2 ppm) and snack foods (5 ppm).
