= Furan-2-ylmethanethiol =

- Kekulé, skeletal formula of furan-2-ylmethanethiol

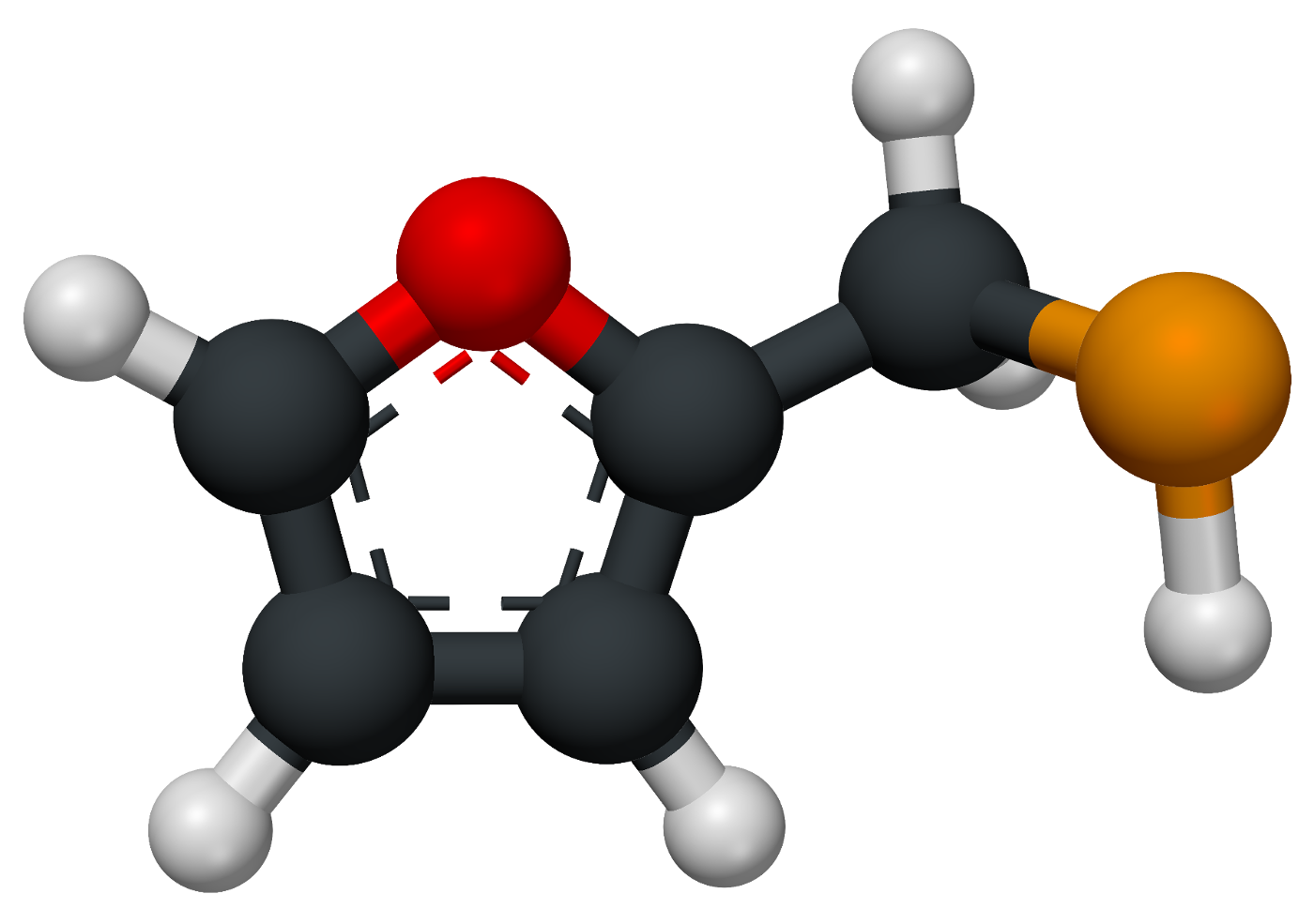
- Ball-and-stick model

Names
- Preferred IUPAC name (Furan-2-yl)methanethiol
- Other names: Furan-2-ylmethanethiol; (2-Furanyl)methylmercaptan; 2-Furfurylmercaptan; Furfuryl mercaptan; 2-Furfurylthiol; Furfuryl thiol; 2-Furylmethanethiol; 2-Furylmethyl mercaptan; 2-(Mercaptomethyl)furan

Identifiers
CAS Number	98-02-2
3D model (JSmol)	Interactive image; Interactive image
Beilstein Reference	383594
ChemSpider	7085
ECHA InfoCard	100.002.390
EC Number	202-628-2
MeSH	furfuryl+mercaptan
PubChem CID	7363
RTECS number	LU2100000
UNII	29W096TCPG
UN number	3336
CompTox Dashboard (EPA)	DTXSID7052654
- InChI: InChI=1S/C5H6OS/c7-4-5-2-1-3-6-5/h1-3,7H,4H2 Key: ZFFTZDQKIXPDAF-UHFFFAOYSA-N
- SMILES: SCc1ccco1; SCC1=CC=CO1

Properties
Chemical formula	C_{5}H_{6}OS
Molar mass	114.16 g·mol^{−1}
Appearance	Colourless liquid
Odor	Roasted coffee, caramel, sulfurous, waxy
Density	1.132 g cm^{−3}
Boiling point	155 °C; 311 °F; 428 K
Vapor pressure	531 Pa

Hazards
- GHS labelling
Pictograms	(GHS02: Flammable)
Signal word	Warning
Hazard statements	H226
Flash point	45 °C (113 °F; 318 K)
- Lethal dose or concentration (LD, LC)
LD_{50} (median dose)	100-200 mg kg^{−1} (mouse)
- Except where otherwise noted, data are given for materials in their standard state (at 25 °C [77 °F], 100 kPa). verify (what is ?) Infobox references

Furan-2-ylmethanethiol (2-furanmethanethiol) is an organosulfur compound. It is classified as a furan substituted with a methylthiol group. It is a colourless liquid, but impure samples can appear yellow. It possesses a strong odour of roasted coffee and a bitter taste. It is a key component of the aroma of roasted coffee. It has been identified as a trigger molecule for parosmia following COVID-19 infection.

== Synthesis ==
Furan-2-ylmethanethiol is prepared by treating furfuryl alcohol with thiourea in hydrochloric acid via an intermediate isothiouronium salt, which is hydrolized to the thiol by heating with sodium hydroxide.

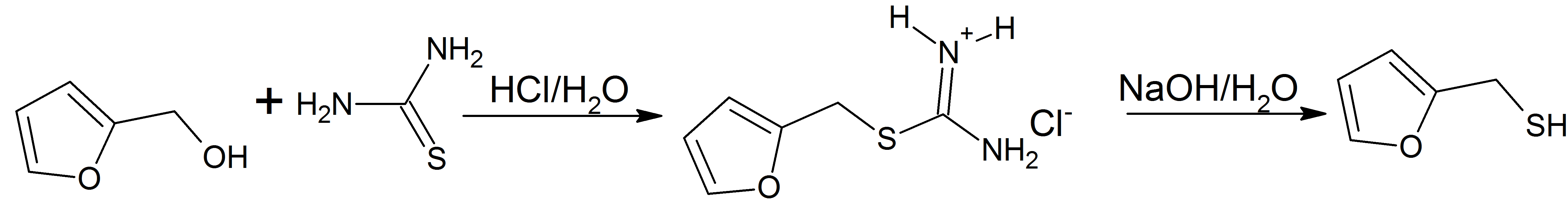
Synthesis of furfuryl mercaptane (Furan-2-ylmethanethiol)
