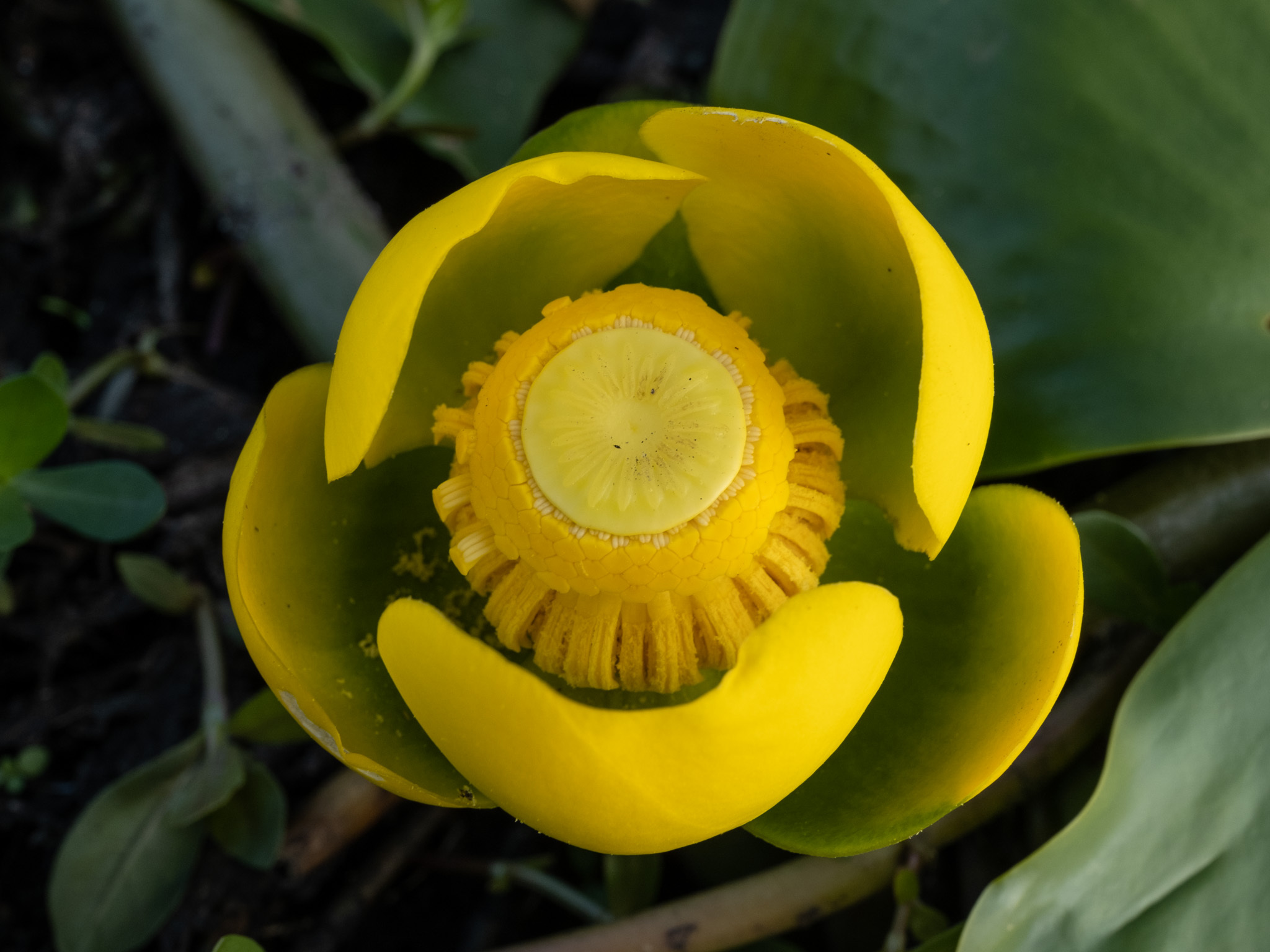

Conservation status
- Secure (NatureServe)

Scientific classification
- Kingdom: Plantae
- Clade: Tracheophytes
- Clade: Angiosperms
- Order: Nymphaeales
- Family: Nymphaeaceae
- Genus: Nuphar
- Section: Nuphar sect. Astylus
- Species: N. advena

Binomial name
- Nuphar advena (Aiton) W.T.Aiton

Synonyms
- List: Castalia advena (Aiton) Conz.; Nenuphar advena (Aiton) Link; Nuphar advena subsp. typica R.T.Clausen; Nuphar lutea subsp. advena (Aiton) J.T.Kartesz & Gandhi; Nymphaea advena Aiton; Nymphona advena (Aiton) Nieuwl.; Nymphozanthus advena (Aiton) Fernald; Nuphar advena var. cubana P.Ponce de León; Nuphar advena var. erythraea (G.S.Mill. & Standl.) Standl.; Nuphar advena var. minor Morong; Nuphar advena var. tomentosa Torr. & A.Gray; Nuphar chartacea (G.S.Mill. & Standl.) Standl.; Nuphar fluviatilis (R.M.Harper) Standl.; Nuphar interfluitans Fernald; Nuphar ludoviciana (G.S.Mill. & Standl.) Standl.; Nuphar lutea subsp. macrophylla (Small) Beal; Nuphar microcarpa (G.S.Mill. & Standl.) Standl.; Nuphar ovata (G.S.Mill. & Standl.) Standl.; Nuphar puberula (G.S.Mill. & Standl.) Standl.; Nuphar puteorum Fernald; Nuphar tomentosa Nutt.; Nymphaea advena subsp. erythraea G.S.Mill. & Standl.; Nymphaea advena var. macrophylla (Small) G.S.Mill. & Standl.; Nymphaea advena subsp. macrophylla (Small) G.S.Mill. & Standl.; Nymphaea arifolia Salisb.; Nymphaea chartacea G.S.Mill. & Standl.; Nymphaea fluviatilis R.M.Harper; Nymphaea ludoviciana G.S.Mill. & Standl.; Nymphaea macrophylla Small; Nymphaea microcarpa G.S.Mill. & Standl.; Nymphaea ovata G.S.Mill. & Standl.; Nymphaea puberula G.S.Mill. & Standl.; Nymphozanthus advena var. macrophyllus (Small) Fernald; Nymphozanthus fluviatilis (R.M.Harper) Fernald

= Nuphar advena =

Species of aquatic plant

Nuphar advena (spatterdock or cow lily or yellow pond-lily) is a species of Nuphar native throughout the eastern United States and in some parts of Canada, as well as Mexico and Cuba. It is locally naturalized in Britain.

== Description ==
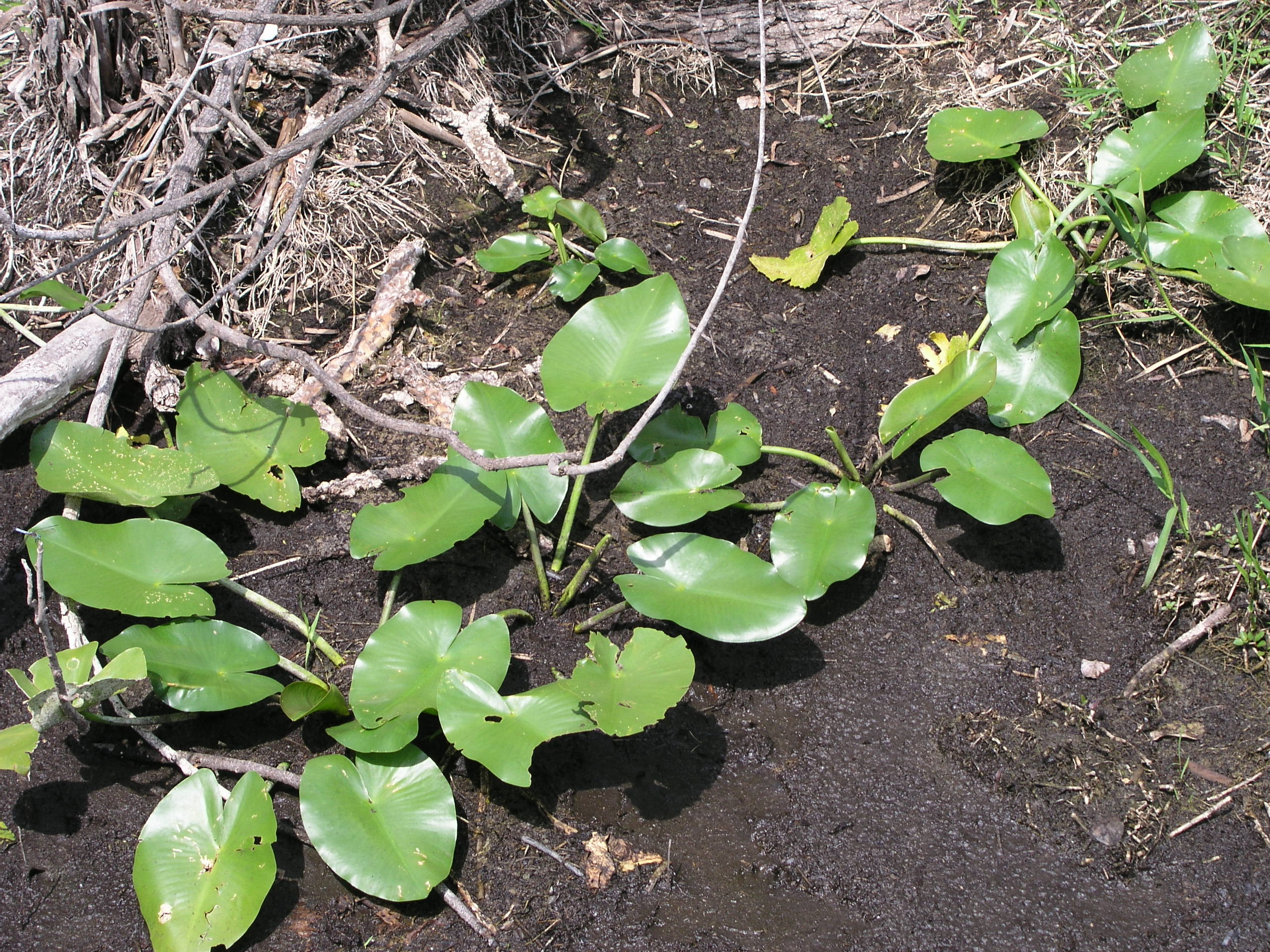
Nuphar advena growing in shallow water

Nuphar advena is a perennial, aquatic herb with spongy rhizomes that are 5–10 centimetres (2–4 in) wide. The leaves are mostly emergent, but can also be floating, or submersed. The submerged leaves are 12–40 cm (4 1/2–15 1/2 in) long and 7–30 cm (3–12 in) wide.

The flowers are protogynous, fragrant, nectariferous, solitary, yellow-green, and up to 4 cm wide. They float on the water surface or extend beyond it. The flowers have six sepals while the gynoecium consists of 9–23 carpels. The fruit is fleshy, ovoid to broadly obovate, ribbed, green, and 2–5 cm long and wide. It contains 186–353 seeds, which are 3–6 mm long.

=== Cytology ===
The chromosome count is 2n = 34. The chloroplast genome is 160866 bp long.

== Taxonomy ==
It was first published as Nymphaea advena Aiton by William Aiton in 1789. It was placed into the genus Nuphar Sm. as Nuphar advena (Aiton) W.T.Aiton published by William Townsend Aiton in 1811. It is placed in the section Nuphar sect. Astylus.

=== Natural hybridisation ===
In the United Kingdom, it has hybridised with Nuphar lutea, resulting in the hybrid Nuphar × porphyranthera.

=== Etymology ===
The specific epithet advena means immigrant, outsider, foreigner, or stranger.

== Distribution and habitat ==
It is native to Canada (such as Nova Scotia), the United States, Mexico, and Cuba. It has been introduced to the United Kingdom.

It occurs in ponds, lakes, streams, rivers, marshes, and swamps.

Herbarium specimen

== Ecology ==
The flowers are pollinated by sweat bees, syrphid flies, and leaf beetles.

The seeds are eaten by turtles and waterfowl.

The rootstocks are sometimes collected by muskrats.

== Conservation ==
The NatureServe conservation status is T5 Secure.

== Uses ==
The plant is used as food. The dried seeds can be eaten or ground to flour. Native Americans cooked the rootstocks and removed the rind to prepare the sweetish, glutinous contents in various ways.

It is also cultivated as an ornamental plant.
