= Neothiobinupharidine =

Names
- Preferred IUPAC name (2′R,3′′R,6S,6′′S,9R,9′′R,9aS,9′′aS)-6,6′′-Di(furan-3-yl)-9,9′′-dimethyldodecahydro-2H,2′′H,4H,4′′H-dispiro[quinolizine-3,2′-thiolane-4′,3′′-quinolizine]

Identifiers
CAS Number	4850-09-3; 30343-72-7
3D model (JSmol)	Interactive image
ChEBI	CHEBI:9548
ChEMBL	ChEMBL138622
ChemSpider	23215070
KEGG	C09990
PubChem CID	12313251
CompTox Dashboard (EPA)	DTXSID401046194
- InChI: InChI=1S/C30H42N2O2S/c1-21-3-5-27(23-9-13-33-15-23)31-18-29(11-7-25(21)31)17-30(35-20-29)12-8-26-22(2)4-6-28(32(26)19-30)24-10-14-34-16-24/h9-10,13-16,21-22,25-28H,3-8,11-12,17-20H2,1-2H3/t21-,22-,25+,26+,27+,28+,29-,30-/m1/s1 Key: WBMOHCBEBDKSBI-GUUMEGLWSA-N
- SMILES: C[C@@H]1CC[C@H](N2[C@H]1CC[C@]3(C2)C[C@@]4(CC[C@H]5[C@@H](CC[C@H](N5C4)c6ccoc6)C)SC3)c7ccoc7

Properties
Chemical formula	C_{30}H_{42}N_{2}O_{2}S
Molar mass	494.74 g·mol^{−1}
- Except where otherwise noted, data are given for materials in their standard state (at 25 °C [77 °F], 100 kPa). Infobox references

Neothiobinupharidine is a dimeric thiaspirane alkaloid isolated from the dwarf water lily Nuphar pumila. It exhibits weak immunosuppressive and cytotoxic bioactivity in cell line experiments.
