= Tetrahydrofurfuryl alcohol =

Names
- Preferred IUPAC name (Oxolan-2-yl)methanol
- Other names Tetrahydrofuran-2-yl methanol; Tetrahydro-2-furanyl methanol; THFA

Identifiers
CAS Number	97-99-4
3D model (JSmol)	Interactive image
ChemSpider	7082
ECHA InfoCard	100.002.387
PubChem CID	7360
RTECS number	LU2450000
UNII	XD95821VF9
CompTox Dashboard (EPA)	DTXSID1029128
- InChI: InChI=1S/C5H10O2/c6-4-5-2-1-3-7-5/h5-6H,1-4H2 Key: BSYVTEYKTMYBMK-UHFFFAOYSA-N
- SMILES: C1CC(OC1)CO

Properties
Chemical formula	C_{5}H_{10}O_{2}
Molar mass	102.133 g·mol^{−1}
Appearance	Colorless liquid
Density	1.0511 g/cm^{3}
Boiling point	178 °C (352 °F; 451 K)

Hazards
Flash point	83.9 °C (183.0 °F; 357.0 K)
- Except where otherwise noted, data are given for materials in their standard state (at 25 °C [77 °F], 100 kPa). Infobox references

Tetrahydrofurfuryl alcohol (THFA) is an organic compound with the formula HOCH_{2}C_{4}H_{7}O. In terms of its structure, it consists of a tetrahydrofuran ring substituted in the 2-position with a hydroxymethyl group. It is a colorless liquid that is used as a specialty solvent and synthetic intermediate, e.g. to 3,4-dihydropyran. It is prepared by hydrogenation of furfural. It is a precursor to 1,5-pentanediol.

== Other uses ==
THFA is often used in epoxy resin formulations in either the epoxy component or amine hardener as well as other general resin applications.
