= Dihydropyran =

In organic chemistry, dihydropyran refers to two heterocyclic compounds with the formula C_{5}H_{8}O:

- 3,4-Dihydro-2H-pyran
- 3,6-dihydro-2H-pyran

== Nomenclature ==
In IUPAC names, "dihydro" refers to the two added hydrogen atoms needed to remove one double bond from the parent compound pyran. The numbers in front of the prefix indicate the position of the added hydrogen atoms (and not the position of the double bonds). The italicized capital H denotes the "indicated hydrogen", which is a second hydrogen atom present on the location where no double bond is present.

== See also ==
- Pyran
- Tetrahydropyran
- Achmatowicz reaction
