= Furfural =

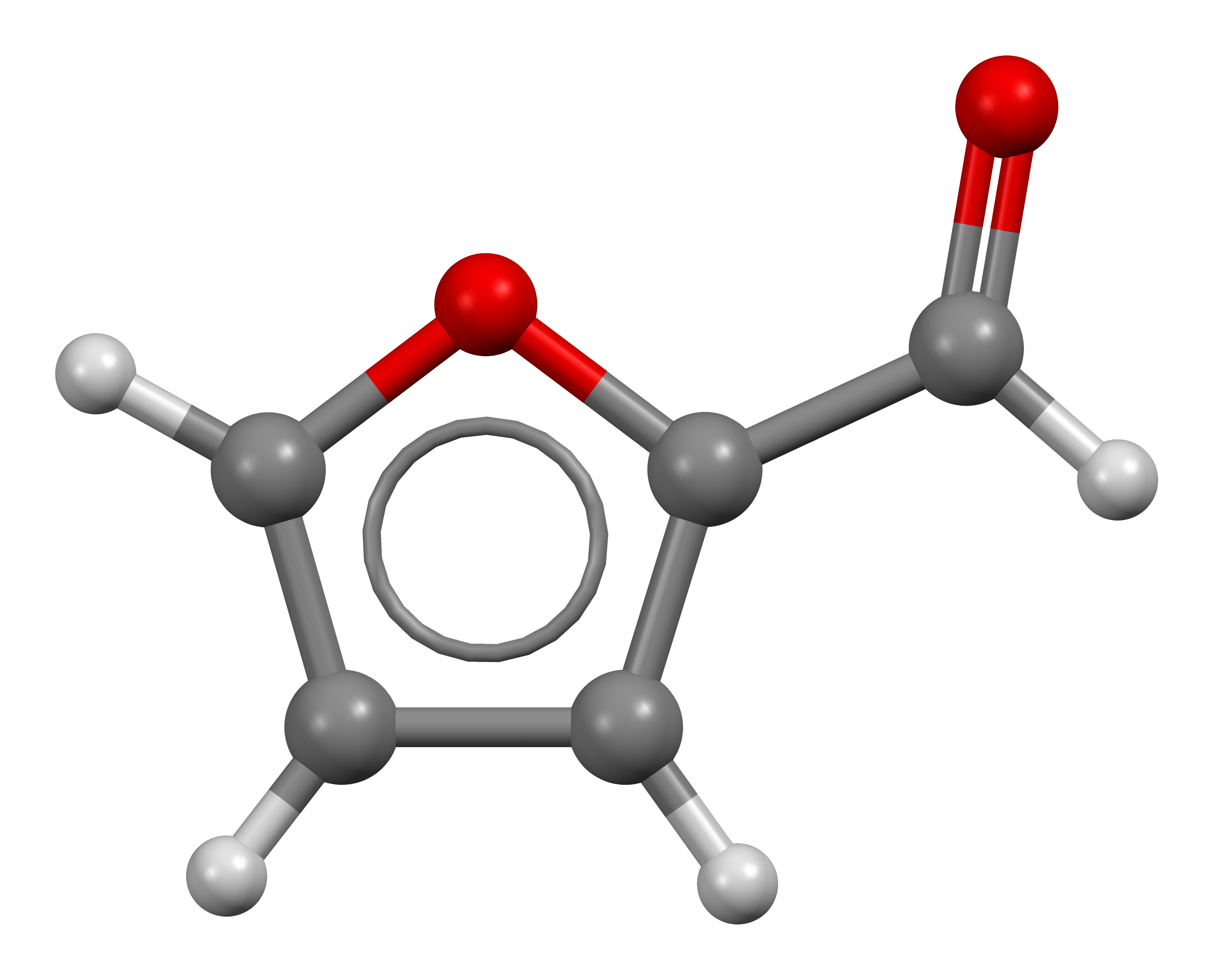

Names
- Preferred IUPAC name Furan-2-carbaldehyde
- Other names Furfural, furan-2-carboxaldehyde, fural, furfuraldehyde, 2-furaldehyde, pyromucic aldehyde

Identifiers
CAS Number	98-01-1
3D model (JSmol)	Interactive image
ChEBI	CHEBI:34768
ChEMBL	ChEMBL189362
ChemSpider	13863629
ECHA InfoCard	100.002.389
KEGG	C14279
PubChem CID	7362
UNII	DJ1HGI319P
CompTox Dashboard (EPA)	DTXSID1020647
- InChI: InChI=1S/C5H4O2/c6-4-5-2-1-3-7-5/h1-4H Key: HYBBIBNJHNGZAN-UHFFFAOYSA-N; InChI=1/C5H4O2/c6-4-5-2-1-3-7-5/h1-4H Key: HYBBIBNJHNGZAN-UHFFFAOYAD
- SMILES: c1cc(oc1)C=O

Properties
Chemical formula	C_{5}H_{4}O_{2}
Molar mass	96.085 g·mol^{−1}
Appearance	Colorless oil
Odor	Almond-like
Density	1.1601 g/mL (20 °C)
Melting point	−37 °C (−35 °F; 236 K)
Boiling point	162 °C (324 °F; 435 K)
Solubility in water	83 g/L
Vapor pressure	2 mmHg (20 °C)
Magnetic susceptibility (χ)	−47.1×10^{−6} cm^{3}/mol

Hazards
Flash point	62 °C (144 °F; 335 K)
Explosive limits	2.1–19.3%
- Lethal dose or concentration (LD, LC)
LD_{50} (median dose)	300–500 mg/kg (oral, mice)
LC_{50} (median concentration)	370 ppm (dog, 6 hr); 175 ppm (rat, 6 hr); 1037 ppm (rat, 1 hr)
LC_{Lo} (lowest published)	370 ppm (mouse, 6 hr); 260 ppm (rat)
- NIOSH (US health exposure limits)
PEL (Permissible)	TWA 5 ppm (20 mg/m^{3}) [skin]
REL (Recommended)	No established REL
IDLH (Immediate danger)	100 ppm

Related compounds
Related Furan-2-carbaldehydes	Hydroxymethylfurfural; Methoxymethylfurfural
- Except where otherwise noted, data are given for materials in their standard state (at 25 °C [77 °F], 100 kPa). verify (what is ?) Infobox references

Furfural is an organic compound with the formula C_{4}H_{3}OCHO. It is a colorless liquid, although commercial samples are often brown. It has an aldehyde group attached to the 2-position of furan. It is a product of the dehydration of sugars, as occurs in a variety of agricultural byproducts, including corncobs, oat, wheat bran, and sawdust. The name furfural comes from the Latin word furfur, meaning bran, referring to its usual source. Furfural is derived only from dried biomass. In addition to ethanol, acetic acid, and sugar, furfural is one of the oldest known organic chemicals available readily purified from natural precursors.

== History ==
Furfural was first isolated in 1821 (published in 1832) by the German chemist Johann Wolfgang Döbereiner, who produced a small sample as a byproduct of formic acid synthesis. In 1840, the Scottish chemist John Stenhouse found that the same chemical could be produced by distilling a wide variety of crop materials, including corn, oats, bran, and sawdust, with aqueous sulfuric acid; he also determined furfural's empirical formula (C_{5}H_{4}O_{2}). George Fownes named this oil "furfurol" in 1845 (from furfur (bran), and oleum (oil)). In 1848, the French chemist Auguste Cahours determined that furfural was an aldehyde. Determining the structure of furfural required some time: the furfural molecule contains a cyclic ether (furan), which tends to break open when it's treated with harsh reagents. In 1870, German chemist Adolf von Baeyer speculated about the structure of the chemically similar compounds furan and 2-furoic acid. Additional research by German chemist Heinrich Limpricht supported this idea. From work published in 1877, Baeyer had confirmed his previous belief on the structure of furfural. By 1886, furfurol was being called "furfural" (short for "furfuraldehyde") and the correct chemical structure for furfural was being proposed. By 1887, the German chemist Willy Marckwald had inferred that some derivatives of furfural contained a furan nucleus. In 1901, the German chemist Carl Harries determined furan's structure through work with succindialdehyde and 2-methylfuran, thereby also confirming furfural's proposed structure.

Furfural remained relatively obscure until 1922, when the Quaker Oats Company began mass-producing it from oat hulls. Today, furfural is still produced from agricultural byproducts like sugarcane bagasse and corn cobs. The main countries producing furfural today are the Dominican Republic, South Africa and China.

== Properties ==
Furfural dissolves readily in most polar organic solvents, but it is only slightly soluble in either water or alkanes.

Furfural participates in the same kinds of reactions as other aldehydes and other aromatic compounds. It exhibits less aromatic character than benzene, as can be seen from the fact that furfural is readily hydrogenated to tetrahydrofurfuryl alcohol. When heated in the presence of acids, furfural irreversibly polymerizes, acting as a thermosetting polymer.

== Production ==
Furfural may be obtained by the acid catalyzed dehydration of 5-carbon sugars (pentoses), particularly xylose.

C_{5}H_{10}O_{5} → C_{5}H_{4}O_{2} + 3 H_{2}O

These sugars may be obtained from pentosans obtained from hemicellulose present in lignocellulosic biomass.

Between 3% and 10% of the mass of crop residue feedstocks can be recovered as furfural, depending on the type of feedstock. Furfural and water evaporate together from the reaction mixture, and separate upon condensation. The global production capacity is about 800,000 tons as of 2012. China is the biggest supplier of furfural, and accounts for the greater part of global capacity. The other two major commercial producers are Illovo Sugar in South Africa and Central Romana in the Dominican Republic.

In the laboratory, furfural can be synthesized from plant material by heating with sulfuric acid or other acids. With the purpose to avoid toxic effluents, an effort to substitute sulfuric acid with easily separable and reusable solid acid catalysts has been studied around the world. The formation and extraction of xylose and subsequently furfural can be favored over the extraction of other sugars with varied conditions, such as acid concentration, temperature, and time.

In industrial production, some lignocellulosic residue remains after the removal of the furfural. This residue is dried and burned to provide steam for the operation of the furfural plant. Newer and more energy efficient plants have excess residue, which is or can be used for co-generation of electricity, cattle feed, activated carbon, mulch/fertiliser, etc.

== Uses and occurrence ==
It is commonly found in many cooked or heated foods such as coffee (55–255 mg/kg) and whole grain bread (26 mg/kg).

In petrochemical industry, furfural is utilized as a specialized chemical solvent for diene extraction.

Furfural is an important renewable, non-petroleum based, chemical feedstock which can be converted into solvents, polymers, fuels and other useful chemicals by a range of catalytic reduction.

Hydrogenation of furfural provides furfuryl alcohol (FA), which is used to produce furan resins, which are exploited in thermoset polymer matrix composites, cements, adhesives, casting resins and coatings. Further hydrogenation of furfuryl alcohol leads to tetrahydrofurfuryl alcohol (THFA), which is used as a solvent in agricultural formulations and as an adjuvant to help herbicides penetrate the leaf structure.

Palladium-catalyzed decarbonylation on furfural manufactures industrially furan.

Another important solvent made from furfural is methyltetrahydrofuran. Furfural is used to make other furan derivatives, such as furoic acid, via oxidation, and furan itself via palladium catalyzed vapor phase decarbonylation.

There is a good market for value added chemicals that can be obtained from furfural, especially in the eco-friendly economy. Recently, a method to use it to directly and simply produce Γ-Butyrolactone with electrolytic catalysts was developed.

== Safety ==
Furfural is carcinogenic in lab animals and mutagenic in single cell organisms, but there is no data on human subjects. It is classified in IARC Group 3 due to the lack of data on humans and too few tests on animals to satisfy Group 2A/2B criteria. It is hepatotoxic.

The median lethal dose is high, 650–900 mg/kg (oral, dogs), consistent with its pervasiveness in foods.

The Occupational Safety and Health Administration has set a permissible exposure limit for furfural at 5 ppm over an eight-hour time-weighted average (TWA), and also designates furfural as a risk for skin absorption.

== See also ==
- Aniline acetate test
- Bial's test
- Molisch's test
- Tollens' reagent
