= 2-Furoic acid =

2-Furoic Acid

Names
- Preferred IUPAC name Furan-2-carboxylic acid
- Other names: 2-Furoic acid; Pyromucic acid; 2-Furancarboxylic acid; α-Furancarboxylic acid; α-Furoic acid; 2-Carboxyfuran

Identifiers
CAS Number	88-14-2
3D model (JSmol)	Interactive image
Beilstein Reference	110149
ChEBI	CHEBI:30845
ChemSpider	10251740
ECHA InfoCard	100.001.639
Gmelin Reference	3056
KEGG	C01546
PubChem CID	6919
UNII	P577F6494A
CompTox Dashboard (EPA)	DTXSID6041420
- InChI: InChI=1S/C5H4O3/c6-5(7)4-2-1-3-8-4/h1-3H,(H,6,7) Key: SMNDYUVBFMFKNZ-UHFFFAOYSA-N; InChI=1/C4H9.Li/c1-3-4-2;/h1,3-4H2,2H3;/rC4H9Li/c1-2-3-4-5/h2-4H2,1H3 Key: MZRVEZGGRBJDDB-NESCHKHYAE
- SMILES: OC(=O)C1=CC=CO1

Properties
Chemical formula	C_{5}H_{4}O_{3}
Molar mass	112.084 g·mol^{−1}
Appearance	White/ Off-White (Beige) Crystalline Powder
Density	0.55 g/cm^{3}
Melting point	128 to 132 °C (262 to 270 °F; 401 to 405 K)
Boiling point	230 to 232 °C (446 to 450 °F; 503 to 505 K)
Solubility in water	Easily soluble in cold and hot water, 27.1 g/L
Acidity (pK_{a})	3.12 at 25 °C

Hazards
- Occupational safety and health (OHS/OSH)
Main hazards	Irritating to eyes, respiratory system and skin.
- GHS labelling
Pictograms	(GHS07: Exclamation mark)
Signal word	Warning
Hazard statements	H315, H319, H335
Precautionary statements	P261, P264, P271, P280, P302+P352, P304+P340, P305+P351+P338, P312, P321, P332+P313, P337+P313, P362, P403+P233, P405, P501
NFPA 704 (fire diamond)	2 1 0

Related compounds
Related compounds	2-Thiophenecarboxylic acid, 3-Furoic acid, Furfuryl alcohol, 2,5-Furandicarboxylic acid, Furfurylamine
- Except where otherwise noted, data are given for materials in their standard state (at 25 °C [77 °F], 100 kPa). verify (what is ?) Infobox references

2-Furoic acid is an organic compound, consisting of a furan ring and a carboxylic acid side-group. Along with other furans, its name is derived from the Latin word furfur, meaning bran, from which these compounds were first produced. The salts and esters of furoic acids are known as furoates. 2-Furoic acid is most widely encountered in food products as a preservative and a flavouring agent, where it imparts a sweet, earthy flavour.

== History ==
The compound was first described by Carl Wilhelm Scheele in 1780, who obtained it by the dry distillation of mucic acid. For this reason it was initially known as pyromucic acid. This was the first known synthesis of a furan compound, the second being furfural in 1821. Despite this, it was furfural which came to set naming conventions for later furans.

== Preparation and synthesis ==
Biotransformation of furfuryl alcohol (R = CH_{2}OH) or furfural (R = CHO) to 2-furoic acid by Nocardia corallina

2-Furoic acid can be synthesized by the oxidation of either furfuryl alcohol or furfural. This can be achieved either chemically or biocatalytically.

The current industrial route involves the Cannizzaro reaction of furfural in an aqueous NaOH solution. This is a disproportionation reaction and produces a 1:1 ratio of 2-furoic acid and furfuryl alcohol (a 50% yield of each). It remains economical because both products have commercial value. The bio-catalytic route involves the microorganism Nocardia corallina. This produces 2-furoic acid in higher yields: 98% from 2-furfuryl alcohol and 88% from 2-furfural, but has yet to be commercialised.

== Applications and occurrences ==
Diloxanide, an amebicide derived from 2-feroic acid, is on the World Health Organization's List of Essential Medicines.

In terms of commercial uses, 2-furoic acid is often used in the production of furoate esters, some of which are drugs and pesticides.

=== In foods ===
It is a flavoring ingredient and achieved a generally recognized as safe (GRAS) status in 1995 by the Flavor and Extract Manufacturers Association (FEMA). 2-Furoic acid has a distinct odor described as sweet, oily, herbaceous, and earthy.

2-Furoic acid helps sterilize and pasteurize many foods. It forms in situ from 2-furfural. 2-Furoic acid is also formed during coffee roasting, with up to 205 mg/kg.

=== Optic properties ===
2-Furoic acid crystals are highly transparent in the 200–2000 nm wavelength region, are stable up to 130 °C, and generally have low absorption in the UV, visible, and IR ranges. In optical and dielectric studies, 2-furoic acid crystals may act as paraelectrics in the temperature range < 318 K and ferroelectrics in temperature ranges > 318 K.

== Microbial metabolism ==
2-Furoic acid can be the sole source of carbon and energy for the organism Pseudomonas putida. The organism aerobically degrades the compound.

== Hazards ==
The LD50 is 100 mg/kg (oral, rats).
