= Furan =

Heterocyclic organic compound,

Full structural formula of furan
Skeletal formula showing numbering convention
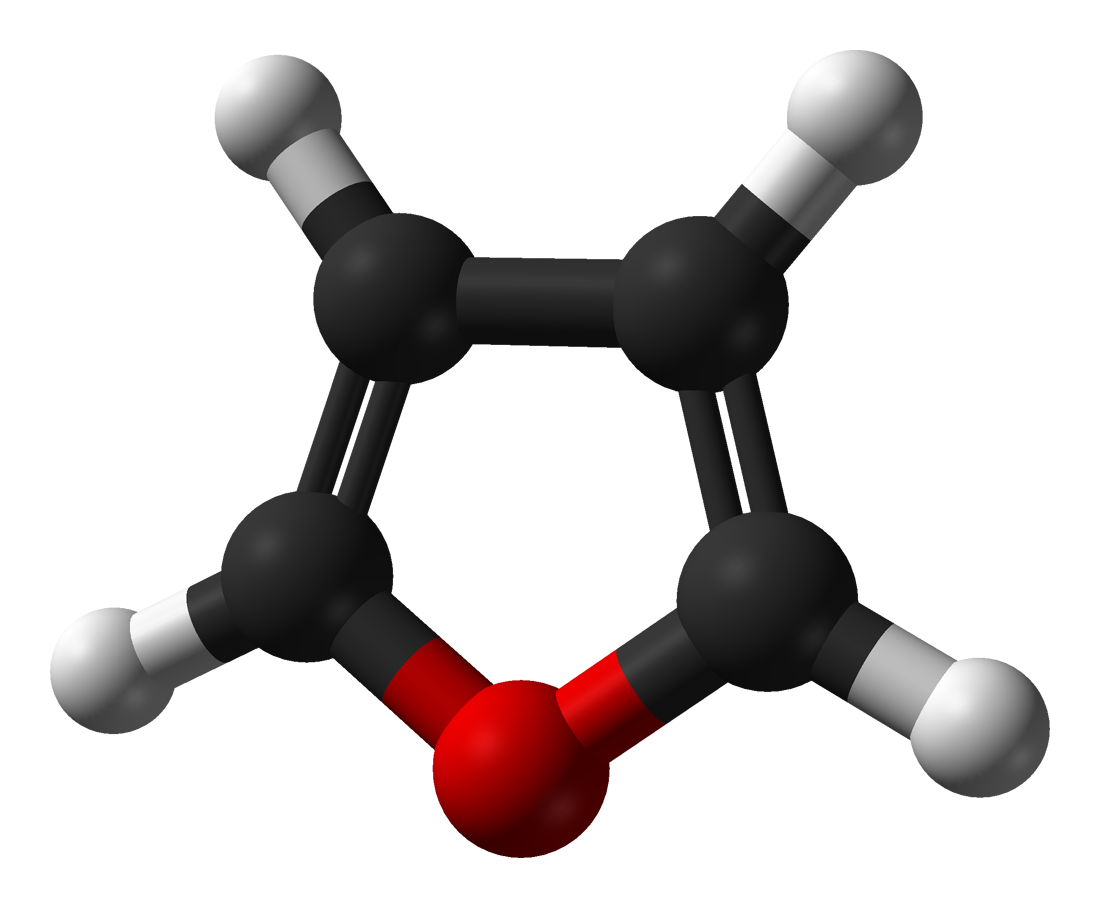
Ball-and-stick model
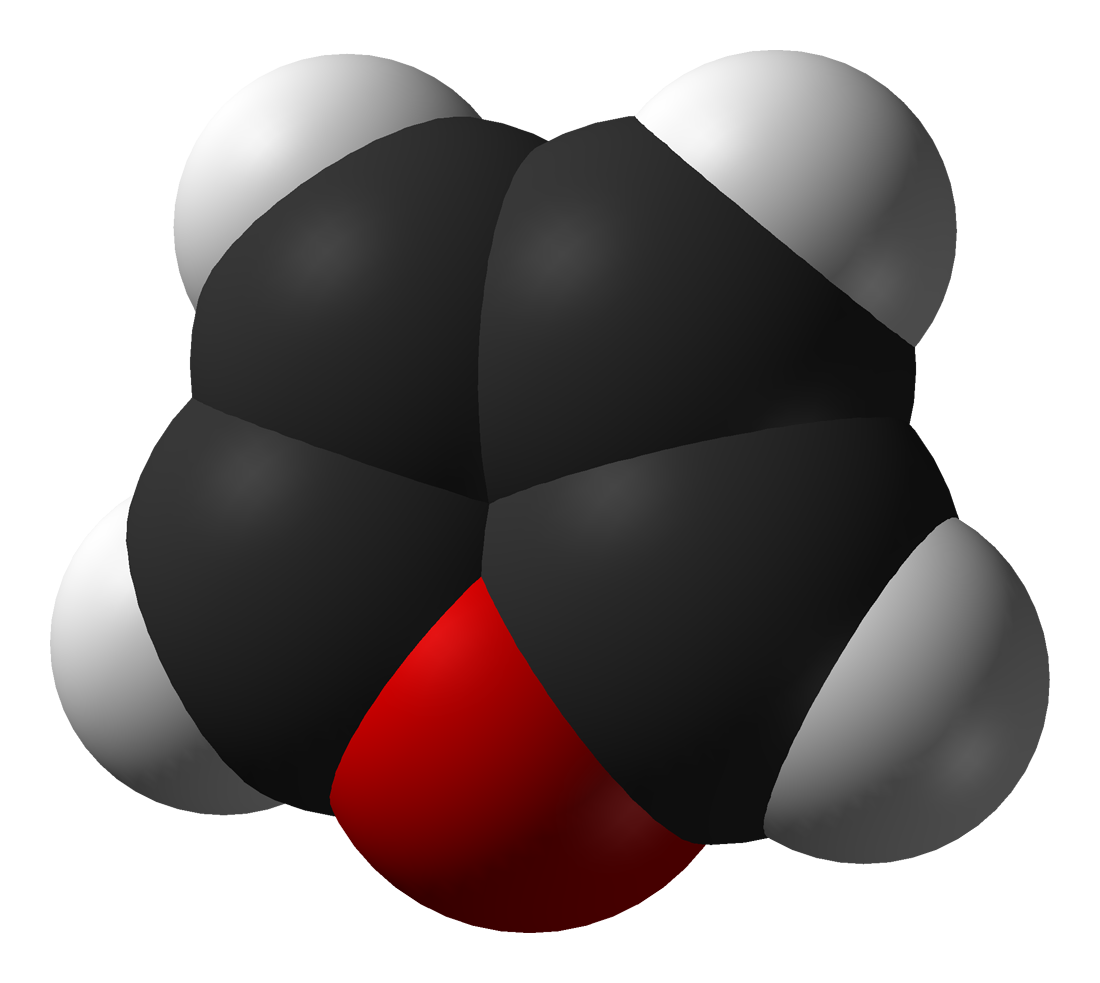
Space-filling model

Names
- Preferred IUPAC name Furan
- Systematic IUPAC name 1,4-Epoxybuta-1,3-diene; 1-Oxacyclopenta-2,4-diene
- Other names Oxole; Oxa[5]annulene; 1,4-Epoxy-1,3-butadiene; 5-Oxacyclopenta-1,3-diene; 5-Oxacyclo-1,3-pentadiene; Furfuran; Divinylene oxide

Identifiers
CAS Number	110-00-9
3D model (JSmol)	Interactive image
Beilstein Reference	103221
ChEBI	CHEBI:35559
ChEMBL	ChEMBL278980
ChemSpider	7738
ECHA InfoCard	100.003.390
EC Number	203-727-3
Gmelin Reference	25716
KEGG	C14275
PubChem CID	8029
RTECS number	LT8524000
UNII	UC0XV6A8N9
UN number	2389
CompTox Dashboard (EPA)	DTXSID6020646
- InChI: InChI=1S/C4H4O/c1-2-4-5-3-1/h1-4H Key: YLQBMQCUIZJEEH-UHFFFAOYSA-N; InChI=1/C4H4O/c1-2-4-5-3-1/h1-4H Key: YLQBMQCUIZJEEH-UHFFFAOYAC
- SMILES: c1ccoc1

Properties
Chemical formula	C_{4}H_{4}O
Molar mass	68.075 g·mol^{−1}
Appearance	Colorless, volatile liquid
Density	0.936 g/mL
Melting point	−85.6 °C (−122.1 °F; 187.6 K)
Boiling point	31.3 °C (88.3 °F; 304.4 K)
Magnetic susceptibility (χ)	−43.09·10^{−6} cm^{3}/mol

Hazards
- GHS labelling
Pictograms	(GHS02: Flammable) (GHS07: Exclamation mark) (GHS08: Health hazard)
Signal word	Danger
Hazard statements	H224, H302, H315, H332, H341, H350, H373, H412
Precautionary statements	P201, P202, P210, P233, P240, P241, P242, P243, P260, P264, P270, P271, P273, P280, P281, P301+P312, P302+P352, P303+P361+P353, P304+P312, P304+P340, P308+P313, P312, P314, P321, P330, P332+P313, P362, P370+P378, P403+P235, P405, P501
NFPA 704 (fire diamond)	3 4 1
Flash point	−36 °C (−33 °F; 237 K)
Autoignition temperature	390 °C (734 °F; 663 K)
Explosive limits	Lower: 2.3% Upper: 14.3% at 20 °C
- Lethal dose or concentration (LD, LC)
LD_{50} (median dose)	> 2 g/kg (rat)
Safety data sheet (SDS)	Pennakem

Related compounds
Related heterocycles	Pyrrole; Thiophene
Related compounds	Tetrahydrofuran (THF); 2,5-Dimethylfuran; Benzofuran; Dibenzofuran

Structure
Point group	C_{2v}
- Except where otherwise noted, data are given for materials in their standard state (at 25 °C [77 °F], 100 kPa). verify (what is ?) Infobox references

Furan is a heterocyclic organic compound, consisting of a five-membered aromatic ring with four carbon atoms and one oxygen atom. Chemical compounds containing such rings are also referred to as furans.

Furan is a colorless, flammable, highly volatile liquid with a boiling point close to room temperature. It is soluble in common organic solvents, including alcohol, ether, and acetone, and is slightly soluble in water. Its odor is strong and chloroform-like. It is toxic and may be carcinogenic in humans. Furan is used as a starting point for other speciality chemicals.

== History ==
The name "furan" comes from the Latin furfur, which means bran (furfural is produced from bran). The first furan derivative to be described was 2-furoic acid, by Carl Wilhelm Scheele in 1780. Another important derivative, furfural, was reported by Johann Wolfgang Döbereiner in 1831 and characterised nine years later by John Stenhouse. Furan itself was first prepared by Heinrich Limpricht in 1870, although he called it "tetraphenol" (as if it were a four-carbon analog to phenol, C_{6}H_{5}OH).

== Production ==
Industrially, furan is manufactured by the palladium-catalyzed decarbonylation of furfural, or by the copper-catalyzed oxidation of 1,3-butadiene:

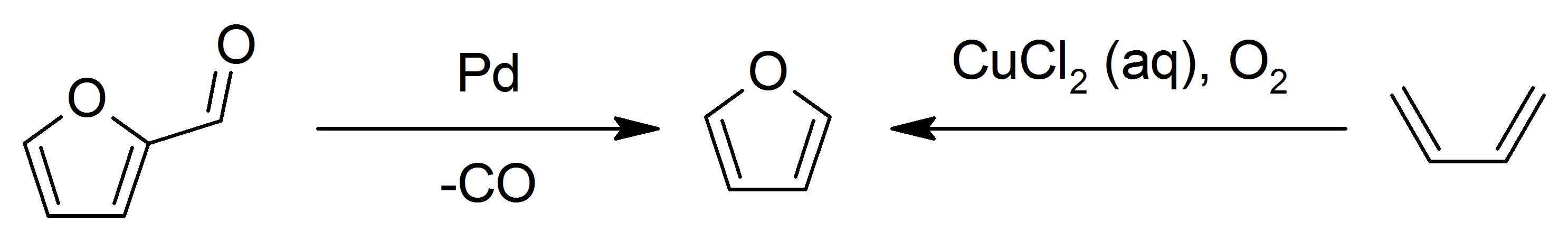

In the laboratory, furan can be obtained from furfural by oxidation to 2-furoic acid, followed by decarboxylation. It can also be prepared directly by thermal decomposition of pentose-containing materials, and cellulosic solids, especially pine wood.

=== Synthesis of furans ===
The Feist–Benary synthesis is a classic way to synthesize furans. The reaction involves alkylation of 1,3-diketones with α-bromoketones followed by dehydration of an intermediate hydroxydihydrofuran. The other traditional route involve the reaction of 1,4-diketones with phosphorus pentoxide (P_{2}O_{5}) in the Paal–Knorr synthesis.

Many routes exist for the synthesis of substituted furans.

Furan in nature and commerce

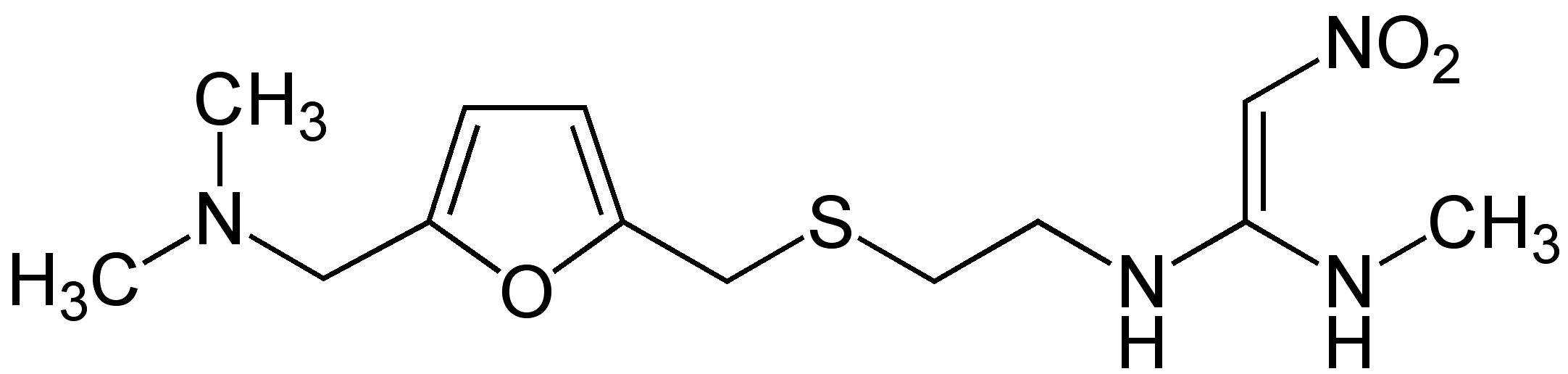
The drug ranitidine, also known as Zantac.

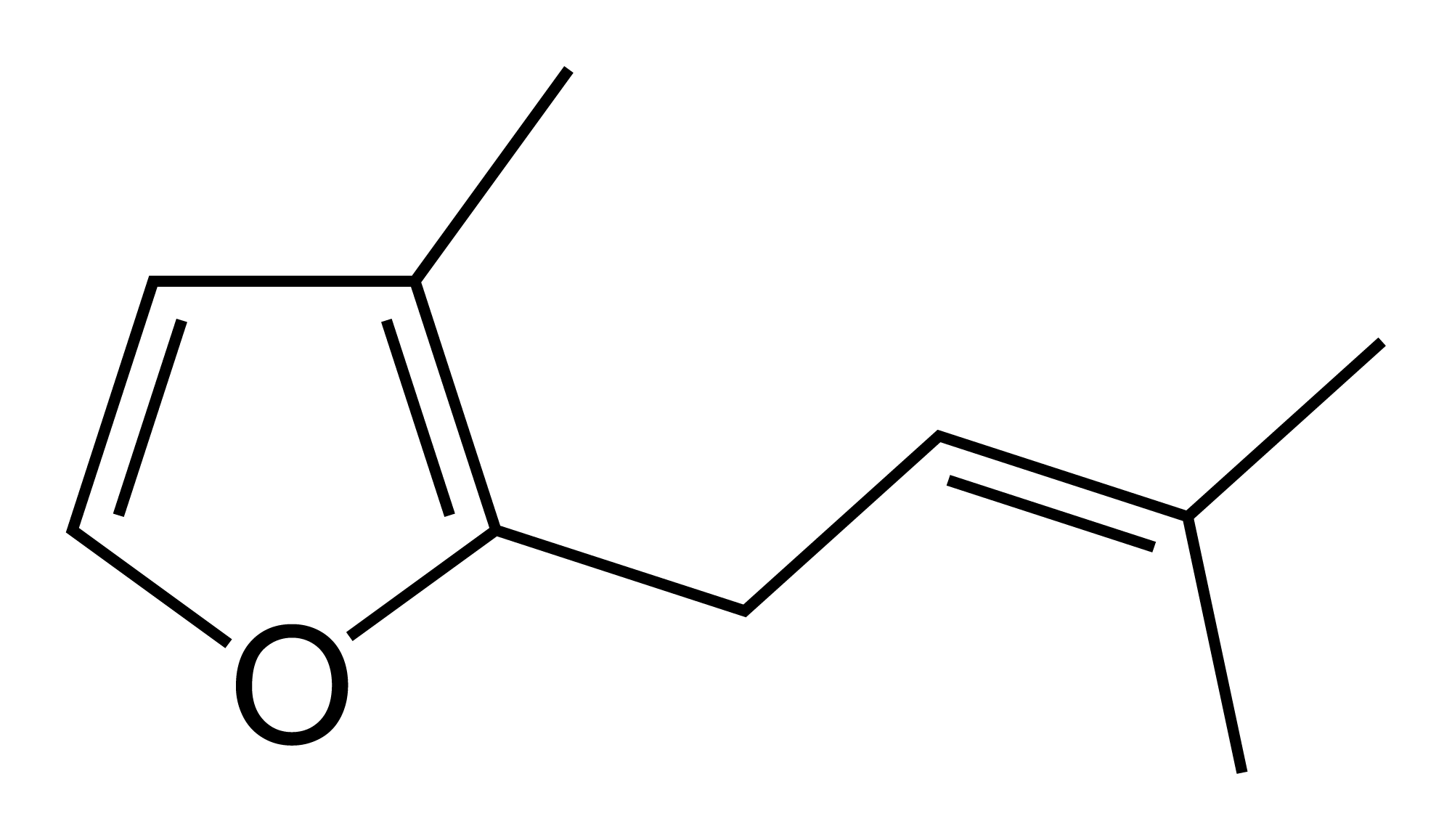
Rosefuran, an aroma compound found in rose oil.

Furfural, derived from sugars, is the major source of furans.

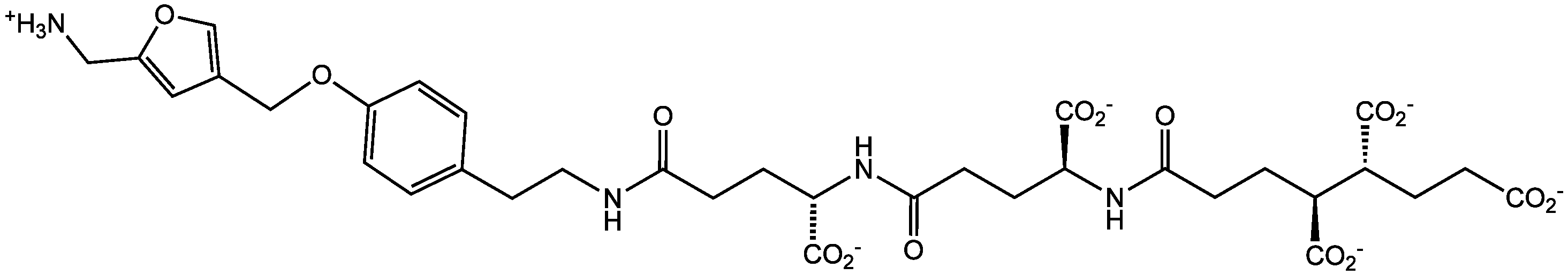
Methanofuran is a cofactor in methanogenesis.

== Structure and bonding ==
Furan has aromatic character because one of the lone pairs of electrons on the oxygen atom is delocalized into the ring, creating a 4n + 2 aromatic system (see Hückel's rule). The aromaticity is modest relative to that for benzene and related heterocycles thiophene and pyrrole. The resonance energies of benzene, pyrrole, thiophene, and furan are, respectively, 152, 88, 121, and 67 kJ/mol (36, 21, 29, and 16 kcal/mol). Thus, these heterocycles, especially furan, are far less aromatic than benzene, as is manifested in the lability of these rings. The molecule is flat but the C=C groups attached to oxygen retain significant double bond character. The other lone pair of electrons of the oxygen atom extends in the plane of the flat ring system.

Examination of the resonance contributors shows the increased electron density of the ring relative to benzene, leading to increased rates of electrophilic substitution.

== Reactivity ==
Because of its partial aromatic character, furan's behavior is intermediate between that of an enol ether and an aromatic ring. It is dissimilar vs ethers such as tetrahydrofuran.

Furan slowly oxidizes in air to give succinaldehyde.

Like enol ethers, 2,5-disubstituted furans are susceptible to hydrolysis to reversibly give 1,4-diketones.

Furan serves as a diene in Diels–Alder reactions with electron-deficient dienophiles such as ethyl (E)-3-nitroacrylate. The reaction product is a mixture of isomers with preference for the endo isomer:

Diels-Alder reaction of furan with arynes provides corresponding derivatives of dihydronaphthalenes, which are useful intermediates in synthesis of other polycyclic aromatic compounds.

- It is considerably more reactive than benzene in electrophilic substitution reactions, due to the electron-donating effects of the oxygen heteroatom. It reacts with bromine at 0 °C to give 2-bromofuran.
- Hydrogenation of furans sequentially affords dihydrofurans and tetrahydrofurans.
- In the Achmatowicz reaction, furans are converted to dihydropyran compounds.
- Pyrrole can be prepared industrially by treating furan with ammonia in the presence of solid acid catalysts, such as SiO_{2} and Al_{2}O_{3}.

== Safety ==
Furan is found in heat-treated commercial foods and is produced through thermal degradation of natural food constituents. It can be found in roasted coffee, instant coffee, and processed baby foods. Research has indicated that coffee made in espresso makers and coffee made from capsules contain more furan than that made in traditional drip coffee makers, although the levels are still within safe health limits.

Exposure to furan at doses about 2,000 times the projected level of human exposure from foods increases the risk of hepatocellular tumors in rats and mice and bile duct tumors in rats. Furan is therefore listed as a possible human carcinogen.

== See also ==
- BS 4994 – Furan resin as thermoset FRP for chemical process plant equipments
- Furanocoumarin
- Furanoflavonoid
- Furanose
- Furantetracarboxylic acid
- Simple aromatic rings
- Furan fatty acids
- Tetrahydrofuran
