= Earl R. Kooi =

American biochemist

- Born: 13 June 1917; Morrison, Illinois
- Died: 23 April 2003 (aged 85); Upland, California
- Occupation: Biochemist

Earl R. Kooi (1917–2003) was an American biochemist best known for being the first to make high fructose corn syrup in 1957 with his partner Richard O. Marshall at the Oklahoma Agricultural Experiment Station. They first discovered how to use the glucose isomerase enzyme to convert glucose to fructose while working at the Corn Products Company. They patented the process in 1960.

== See also ==
- High maltose corn syrup
- High fructose corn syrup and health
