= Richard O. Marshall =

American inventor and scientist

Richard O. Marshall was an American inventor and scientist. He is best known for being the first person to create High Fructose Corn Syrup along with his partner Earl R. Kooi in 1957. They first discovered how to use the glucose isomerase enzyme to convert glucose to fructose while working at the Corn Products Company. They patented the process in 1960.

== See also ==
- High-maltose corn syrup
- High fructose corn syrup and health
