= CMF =

CMF, a three letter abbreviation, may stand for:

== Entertainment ==
- Campus MovieFest, the world's largest student film festival
- Chern Medal Foundation, an organization that bestows the Chern Medal Award in mathematics

== Military ==
- Central Mediterranean Forces, the British component of the Mediterranean theatre of World War II
- Citizen Military Forces (1943–1980), became Australian Army Reserve
- Combined Maritime Forces, a multi-national naval force

== Religion ==
- Christian Missionary Fellowship International (CMF International, formerly CMF), a non-denominational Christian missionary
- Claretians, Roman Catholic religious order, 'CMF' is used as a post nominal

== Science and technology ==
- CMF (chemotherapy), a chemotherapy regimen commonly used in treating breast cancer
- Centre of mass frame in mechanics
- Chaikin Money Flow, a technical stock chart indicator
- Color matching fields or functions, a triplet of spectral sensitivity curves in color vision modeling. See CIE 1931 color space#Color matching functions
- Common Monomial Factor, the factored form of a polynomial, also known as the greatest common divisor of two polynomials
- Composite metal foam, a type of metal foam formed from hollow beads of one metal within a solid matrix of another
- Content management framework for customizing management of media content
- Cranio-maxillofacial surgery, involves the correction of congenital and acquired conditions of the head and face.
- Creative Music File, an AdLib/MIDI hybrid music format developed by Creative Labs
- Critical Manufacturing, a spin-off company of Critical Software
- Cymomotive force, a measurement of radiated power or signal strength from an antenna
- 5-Chloromethylfurfural, an organochlorine compound obtained from fructose
- Renault–Nissan Common Module Family, a modular automobile platform developed by Renault–Nissan Alliance
- Crash Modification Factor, a way of predicting the change in safety for roadway design changes

== Society and law ==
- California Medical Facility, a male-only state prison in California
- Canada Media Fund, a not-for-profit public-private partnership which financially supports the creation of Canadian television and new media
- Certificate of Management Fundamentals, a professional certification from the Commonwealth of Kentucky
- Chambéry Airport (IATA: CMF), in Savoie, France
- Christian Medical Fellowship, an evangelical, interdenominational organisation that links together Christian doctors and medical students in the UK
- Country Music Foundation, a non-profit, educational organisation, operating The Country Music Hall of Fame and Museum

== Other ==
- City Music Foundation, a music charity in the City of London, England
- CMF by Nothing, a budget sub-brand of consumer electronics company Nothing
- Collectible Minifigure, individually sold collectible Lego figures
- Color, Material and Finishes, in CMF design
