= 5-Methylfurfuryl alcohol =

Chemical compound

Names
- IUPAC name (5-methylfuran-2-yl)methanol
- Other names: 2-Furanmethanol, 5-methyl-; (5-Methylfur-2-yl)-methanol; Furfural propyleneglycol acetal

Identifiers
CAS Number	3857-25-8
3D model (JSmol)	Interactive image
ChemSpider	454366
ECHA InfoCard	100.197.708
EC Number	672-135-9
PubChem CID	520911
UNII	0JVO5EFA0A
CompTox Dashboard (EPA)	DTXSID30191894
- InChI: InChI=1S/C6H8O2/c1-5-2-3-6(4-7)8-5/h2-3,7H,4H2,1H3 Key: VOZFDEJGHQWZHU-UHFFFAOYSA-N
- SMILES: CC1=CC=C(O1)CO

Properties
Chemical formula	C_{6}H_{8}O_{2}
Molar mass	112.128 g·mol^{−1}
Density	1.082-1.088 g/mL (20 °C)

Hazards
- GHS labelling
Pictograms	(GHS07: Exclamation mark)
Signal word	Warning
Hazard statements	H302
Precautionary statements	P264, P270, P301+P317, P330, P501
- Except where otherwise noted, data are given for materials in their standard state (at 25 °C [77 °F], 100 kPa). Infobox references

5-Methylfurfuryl alcohol is an organic compound with the formula C_{6}H_{8}O_{2}. It is one of many volatile compounds present in Nicotiana tabacum, and is formed from the reduction of 5-methylfurfural, a compound formed from the reduction of 5-bromo- or 5-chloromethylfurfural. It is a colorless liquid listed as a food additive with FEMA number 4544 and JECFA number 2099.

== Occurrence ==
5-Methylfurfuryl alcohol naturally occurs as one of many volatile compounds present in Nicotiana tabacum, or cultivated tobacco. The compound appears at much lower concentration in tobacco leaves than the more common aldehyde furfural.

As the reduction product of 5-methylfurfural, 5-methylfurfuryl alcohol occurs in barrel-aged wines along with 5-methylfurfuryl ethyl ether.

== Synthesis ==
5-Methylfurfuryl alcohol can be produced through a reduction of 5-methylfurfural with lithium aluminium hydride, though historically the reduction has been performed starting with methyl 5-methyl–2-furoate rather than 5-methylfurfural.
