= C6H8O3 =

The molecular formula C_{6}H_{8}O_{3} (molar mass: 128.13 g/mol, exact mass: 128.0473 u) may refer to:

- 2,5-Bis(hydroxymethyl)furan
- Adipic anhydride
- Dihydrolevoglucosenone
- Dihydrophloroglucinol
- Furaneol
- HOCPCA
- Sotolon
