= Richard Marshall =

Richard Marshall may refer to:

- Richard Marshal, 3rd Earl of Pembroke (1191–1234)
- Richard Marshall (priest) (1517–?), English dean of Christ Church and administrator at Oxford University
- Richard Marshall (United States Army officer) (1895–1973), U.S. Army general who served in both World War I and World War II
- Richard Marshall (rugby league) (born 1975), rugby league footballer
- Richard Marshall (defensive back) (born 1984), American football player for the San Diego Chargers
- Richard Bud Marshall (1941–2009), American football defensive lineman
- Richard Marshall (DJ), British DJ who has also recorded under the name Scanty Sandwich
- Richard Purvis Marshall (1818–1872), British pastoral squatter and Native Police officer in the colonies of New South Wales and Queensland
- Richard O. Marshall, creator of high fructose corn syrup with his partner Earl R. Kooi
- Richard Marshall (entrepreneur), British barber and business leader, founder of Pall Mall Barbers
- Richard Marshall (Zodiac Killer suspect)
