= AJ Dungo =

American surfer and illustrator

Dungo in 2026

AJ Dungo is an American surfer and illustrator known for his 2019 graphic novel In Waves. While writing In Waves, Dungo was a CMF designer for a footwear manufacturer. The book was originally an art school project about surfer Tom Blake, but expanded to include information on Duke Kahanamoku in what Surfer magazine calls "the creeping face of the commercialization of Hawaiian surf culture." While he was writing the book, Dungo's partner of eight years died from cancer, and his grief over that greatly influenced the final story.

Dungo cites Raymond Pettibon and James Jean as early influences. His illustrations have appeared in the New York Times, Bleacher Report, and in Nike's Runner's Journal.

Dungo was born in Fort Myers, Florida, and grew up in Southern California. His parents were both nurses. He has an older brother who he illustrated a story about for the New York Times. He attended ArtCenter College of Design.
