= 5-Methylfurfural =

Chemical compound

Names
- IUPAC name 5-Methylfuran-2-carbaldehyde
- Other names: 5-Methyl-2-furaldehyde; 2-Furancarboxaldehyde, 5-methyl-

Identifiers
CAS Number	620-02-0
3D model (JSmol)	Interactive image
ChEBI	CHEBI:2091
ChEMBL	ChEMBL2230304
ChemSpider	11600
ECHA InfoCard	100.009.658
EC Number	210-622-6
KEGG	C11115
PubChem CID	12097
UNII	4482BZC72D
CompTox Dashboard (EPA)	DTXSID1060714
- InChI: InChI=1S/C6H6O2/c1-5-2-3-6(4-7)8-5/h2-4H,1H3 Key: OUDFNZMQXZILJD-UHFFFAOYSA-N
- SMILES: CC1=CC=C(O1)C=O

Properties
Chemical formula	C_{6}H_{6}O_{2}
Molar mass	110.112 g·mol^{−1}
Density	1.098-1.108 g/mL (20 °C)
Boiling point	187 °C (369 °F; 460 K)
Solubility in water	3.3 g/100mL

Hazards
- GHS labelling
Pictograms	(GHS07: Exclamation mark)
Signal word	Warning
Hazard statements	H315, H319, H335
Precautionary statements	P261, P264, P264+P265, P271, P280, P302+P352, P304+P340, P305+P351+P338, P319, P321, P332+P317, P337+P317, P362+P364, P403+P233, P405, P501
- Except where otherwise noted, data are given for materials in their standard state (at 25 °C [77 °F], 100 kPa). Infobox references

5-Methylfurfural is an organic compound with the formula C_{6}H_{6}O_{2}. An aldehyde that is derived through various extractions and reductions from cellulose products, it has applications as a synthetic intermediate relevant to the fields of medicine, agriculture and cosmetics. It is a food additive, and has FEMA number 270s and JECFA number 745. Reduction of 5-methylfurfural gives the product 5-methylfurfuryl alcohol.

== Synthesis ==
The synthesis of 5-methylfurfural has been documented from as early as 1891. It was originally synthesized from rhamnose, but can be produced from the dehydration of sucrose and other cellulose products. Several synthetic pathways have been proposed from 5-hydroxymethylfurfural. The compound has been produced in the 21st century using the historical precursor of rhamnose with the aim to use it as a precursor to biogasoline.
