= C6H8O =

The molecular formula C_{6}H_{8}O (molar mass: 96.13 g/mol, exact mass: 96.05751 u) may refer to:

- Cyclohexenone
- 2,5-Dimethylfuran
- 2,3-Dimethylfuran
- 2,4-Dimethylfuran
- 3,4-Dimethylfuran
- 2,4-Hexadienal
