= Clino Castelli =

Italian industrial designer and artist

Clino Trini Castelli (born in Civitavecchia, 1944) is an Italian industrial designer and artist. He used the concept of "noform" throughout his work in environmental and industrial design, developed through the use of Design Primario and CMF design.

== Career ==
After graduating school in Turin in 1961, Castelli started working at the design center of Fiat Automobiles. After three years, he moved to Olivetti in Milan, where he worked in the studio of Ettore Sottsass. At the same time, he was part of the growing Arte Povera movement in Turin, alongside artists like Michelangelo Pistoletto, Piero Gilardi and Alighiero Boetti. In Milan, he worked in fashion, meeting Nanni Strada and Elio Fiorucci. In 1967, he founded Intrapresa Design with Fiorucci.

From 1969 to 1973, he devised the Red Books, the first manuals developed in the "metaproject" format, which led to the creation of Olivetti's corporate identity programme. In 1973, with Andrea Branzi and Massimo Morozzi, he started the Centro Design Montefibre. A year later, he founded the CDM (Consulenti Design Milano) company with the same partners. In 1978, he founded the Colorterminal IVI di Milano, the first center to use RGB color technologies and CMF design, and four years later, he formed Gruppo Colorscape for urban planning.

Throughout the 1980s, he worked with Louis Vuitton and Vitra in Europe, Herman Miller in the United States, and Mitsubishi in Japan. During this period, he re-established his partnership with Fiat, which led to the creation in 1985 of the Centro di Qualistica Fiat, the "Qualistic Compendium" program with Olivetti, and CMF product range planning with Cassina. He was also one of the first in Europe to explore the concept of home automation, in collaboration with Bticino, Legrand, and Somfy.

During the 1990s, he started new design ventures in Japan with Hitachi, Toli, and Itoki. At the same time, he taught design at the Politecnico di Milano and the Domus Academy, of which he was one of the founders in 1983. From 1994 to 2005, he wrote articles on design culture for the magazine Interni. In 2000, he founded the Qualistic Lab, a division of Castelli Design that developed new instruments for the emotional positioning of images and products.

== Awards ==
- ADI Compasso d'Oro award for Meraklon Sistema "Fibermatching 25", Centro Design Montefibre, 1979
- ADI Compasso d'Oro award for Abito Politubolare, Calza Bloch, 1979
- Interior Design Magazine Annual Award for Showroom Design, Herman Miller. Neocon XV, Chicago, 1983
- IBD Product Design Gold Award for Color, Fabric, Finish Program for Seating, CMF Design for Fabric Collection, Herman Miller Inc., 1984
- Intel Design '99 award for the CMF Design of the products Wood & Metal, Sfera Modulare and Metal & Metal, Bticino, 1999
- IF Product Design Gold Award for Hitachi Enterprise Server EP8000 Series, Hitachi, 2007
- IF Product Design Award 2011 for VSP – Virtual Storage Platform, Hitachi, 2011
- Machine Design Award 2011 Grand Prize, Japan / Ministry of Economy, Trade and Industry for VSP – Virtual Storage Platform, Hitachi, 2011

== Publications ==
- Servizio di Corporate Image. Sistemi di identificazione (Red Books) Olivetti, Ivrea, 1971
- Il Lingotto Primario Arcadia, Milan, 1985. ISBN 9788885684102
- Transitive Design, A Design Language for the Zeroes, Milan: Electa, 1999. ISBN 978-8843571390
- Worldscape. The new domotic landscape, Milan: Nava, 2006
- The Glamour System. Stephen Gundle, Clino Trini Castelli. Palgrave Macmillan, 2006 ISBN 978-0333733806
- Observatory on Interni n. 445–550, Milan: Mondadori, 1994–2005
- No-form 2020 Corraini, 2019 ISBN 9788875707804
- Ali Salman Alighiero Boetti Forma, Milan, 2021

== Bibliography ==
- Akiko Takehara, The "Philosopher of Color" Clino Castelli, on: Car Styling n. 48, Los Angeles: Car Styling Publishing, 1984, pp. 13–36
- John Thackara, Designing without form, on: Design n. 440, August 1985, pp. 38–39
- Mikio Kuranishi, Clino Castelli. Great Design of the World, Bekkan Taiyo n. 30, Tokyo, December 1989, pp. 98–99
- Thomas C. Mitchell, New Thinking In Design, Conversations on Theory and Practice, New York: Van Nostrand Reinhold, 1996, pp. 60–71
- Guido Musante, Mater Materia 2, on: Interni n. 649, Milan: Mondadori, 2015, pp. 62–65
