= Levoglucosenone =

Names
- Preferred IUPAC name (1S,5R)-6,8-Dioxabicyclo[3.2.1]oct-2-en-4-one
- Systematic IUPAC name 1,6-Anhydro-3,4-dideoxy-β-d-glycero-hex-3-enoyranos-2-ulose

Identifiers
CAS Number	37112-31-5
3D model (JSmol)	Interactive image
ChEBI	CHEBI:30999
ChemSpider	492755
PubChem CID	699486
UNII	B7N23SN1LB
CompTox Dashboard (EPA)	DTXSID70880912
- InChI: InChI=1S/C6H6O3/c7-5-2-1-4-3-8-6(5)9-4/h1-2,4,6H,3H2/t4-,6+/m0/s1 Key: HITOXZPZGPXYHY-UJURSFKZSA-N
- SMILES: C1[C@@H]2C=CC(=O)[C@H](O1)O2

Properties
Chemical formula	C_{6}H_{6}O_{3}
Molar mass	126.111 g·mol^{−1}
Appearance	yellow liquid
Density	1.304 g/cm^{3} (20 °C)
Boiling point	231 °C; 448 °F; 504 K
Vapor pressure	6.2 Pa (25 °C)
Refractive index (n_{D})	1.5065 (20 °C)
- Except where otherwise noted, data are given for materials in their standard state (at 25 °C [77 °F], 100 kPa). Infobox references

Levoglucosenone is an organic compound with the formula [OCH_{2}(CH)_{4}CO_{2}]. A pale-yellow liquid, it is an unsaturated bicyclic ketone-diether formed from cellulose, two pathways exist levoglucosan by loss of two molecules of water, to which it turns into DGP and AGF, however a second pathway occurs in the Cellulose in the absence of acid, an event not seen when just conducted with levoglucosan which suggests an unknown pathway. As a product of the acid-catalysed pyrolysis of cellulose, _{D}-glucose, and levoglucosan, this liquid hydrocarbon is of interest as a biofuel and bio feedstock.

== Production ==
The compound was first identified in 1970 as a product of the thermal decomposition of cellulose.

Pyrolysis of Cellulose to form Levoglucosenone

The primary way of obtaining levoglucosenone is via pyrolysis of carbohydrates, particularly cellulose. Levoglucosenone can be derived from biomass or from other cellulosic materials including domestic/commercial wastepaper. The availability of multiple sources is a key advantage when compared to other platform chemicals which are solely derived from biomass.

The title compound is produced when cellulose is heated above 170 °C with sulfuric acid with various additives. Alongside levoglucosenone as a major product, 2-furfuraldehyde is sometimes formed in 5-10%. The bio-oil can be vacuum distilled, resulting in purified levoglucosenone. The use of polar, aprotic solvents such as THF, γ-valerolactone and sulfolane has been found to improve pyrolytic yields, as the solvents cause swelling of the cellulose and inhibit repolymerisation back to levoglucosan. These solvents also promote catalytic dehydration of levoglucosan to levoglucosenone.

Microwave irradiation of microcrystalline cellulose can also be used to produce levoglucosenone.

Catalytic hydrogenation of LGO

Cellulose-containing waste from biorefineries can also be converted into 6-8% LGO under microwave irradiation in addition to the usual decomposition products such as hydroxymethylfurfural (HMF), formic acid, formaldehyde, CO_{2} and water.

== Reactions ==
As a highly functionalized, chiral compound, levoglucosenone is a precursor to a variety of compounds. Levoglucosenone is a potential bio-renewable platform for the production of commodity chemicals. This is due to new insight provided by Huber and co-workers into how to transform this molecule into α,ω-diols, monomers for the production of polyesters and polyurethanes.

Palladium on carbon (and related Pd- and Pt-based catalysts) act on the title compound by hydrogenation (i.e. dihydrolevoglucosenone and levoglucosanol) and hydrogenolysis (i.e. tetrahydrofurandimethanol (THFDM) and 1,6-hexanediol).

Levoglucosenone is a Michael acceptor enabling its conversion to a variety of derivatives.

== See also ==
- Dihydrolevoglucosenone
