= C7H8O3 =

The molecular formula C_{7}H_{8}O_{3} (molar mass: 140.14 g/mol, exact mass: 140.0473 u) may refer to:

- Ethyl maltol
- Methoxymethylfurfural (MMF or 5-methoxymethylfuran-2-carbaldehyde)
