= Streptomyces murinus =

Scientific classification
- Domain: Bacteria
- Kingdom: Bacillati
- Phylum: Actinomycetota
- Class: Actinomycetes
- Order: Streptomycetales
- Family: Streptomycetaceae
- Genus: Streptomyces
- Species: S. murinus

Binomial name
- Streptomyces murinus Frommer 1959 (Approved Lists 1980)

Type strain
- ATCC 19788, BCRC 12061, CBS 540.68, CCRC 12061, CECT 3309, DSM 40091, DSMZ 40091, IFO 12799, IFO 14802, ISP 5091, Ital. 1131, Ital1131, JCM 4333, JCM 4595, KCC S-0333, KCCS-0333, KCTC 9492, LMG 10475, NBRC 12799, NBRC 14802, NCIMB 12701, NRRL B-2286, NRRL-ISP 5091, PCM 2369, ptcc1136, RIA 1067, Shirling ISP 5091, UNIQEM 174, VKM Ac-1190

Synonyms
- Streptomyces costaricanus Esnard et al. 1995; Streptomyces phaeogriseichromatogenes Goodfellow et al. 2008

Species of bacterium

Streptomyces murinus is a bacterium species from the genus of Streptomyces which has been isolated from soil. Streptomyces murinus produces the actinomycin X complex and glucose isomerase Streptomyces murinus can be used for its production of glucose isomerase in the food industry. Streptomyces murinus produces lankamycin and lankacidin.

== See also ==
- List of Streptomyces species
