= FDCA =

FDCA may refer to:

- 2,5-furandicarboxylic acid, oxidized furan derivative and important building block for range of polymers
- Federal Food, Drug, and Cosmetic Act, set of laws passed by Congress giving authority to the U.S. Food and Drug Administration
