= Nanni Strada =

Italian fashion designer

Nanni Strada is a Milan based fashion and textile designer who has produced collections for Dolomite, Ermenegildo Zegna, Fiorucci, La Perla, Max Mara, Nordica, and Visconti di Modrone among others. Strada produced the first plastic sandals and injected-molded footwear for Fiorucci in 1966.

== History ==
In 1973, Nanni Strada made a film with Clino Castelli titled "The Cloak and the Skin", which combined documentation of two of her most well known projects to illustrate two fundamental different approaches to clothing's function and manufacture. Strada's "Cloak" is made of layers of quilted cloth cut along straight lines, the seams being simply placed edge-to-edge and overstitched. The design of the "Cloak" is determined by the structure of its single-piece construction. The "Skin" was the first complete one-piece body stocking produced in a single manufacturing operation. The film analyzed the application of the Pantysol method in the manufacturing of the "Skin", illustrating how the fabrication of an H-shaped tubular structure in which the cut of the neckline corresponds to the crotch of the tights.

In 1999, Nanni Strada inaugurated the first laboratory of fashion design at the School of Design of the Politecnico di Milano, Milan. Her ‘anti-academic’ classes were collected in the book “Lectures. Fashion‐Design and Project Culture”, published by Lupetti in 2013.

== Exhibitions ==
The 2008 Somerset House exhibition of "Skin and Bones" curated Strada's work alongside figures such as Junya Watanabe, Shigeru Ban, Bernard Tschumi, Zaha Hadid, and Peter Eisenman.

Nanni Strada's work has been exhibited in major museums around the world including the Cooper Hewitt Museum in New York (1976), the Musée de la Mode de la Ville de Paris (2000), the MOCA - Museum of Contemporary Art in Los Angeles (2006–2007), the National Art Center in Tokyo (2007), the Mori Arts Museum in Tokyo (2007), Somerset House in London (2008), the NAMOC - National Art Museum of China in Beijing (2008), the National Museum of Science and Technology in Milan (2011), the State Historical Museum in Moscow (2011–2012).

== Awards and recognition ==
Nanni Strada received a Compasso d'Oro in 1979, and a Lifetime Achievement Compasso d'Oro in 2018.
