= Streptomyces rubiginosus =

Scientific classification
- Domain: Bacteria
- Kingdom: Bacillati
- Phylum: Actinomycetota
- Class: Actinomycetes
- Order: Streptomycetales
- Family: Streptomycetaceae
- Genus: Streptomyces
- Species: S. rubiginosus

Binomial name
- Streptomyces rubiginosus Pridham et al. 1958

Type strain
- ATCC 19927, ATCC 23961, BCRC 13781, CBS 944.68, CCRC 13781, CGMCC 4.1773, DSM 40177, ETH 28445, IFO 12913, INA 11852, ISP 5177, JCM 4416, KCC S-0416, KCTC 9042, LMG 20268, NBRC 12913, NRRL B-3983, NRRL-ISP 5177, RIA 1137, VKM Ac-1089

Synonyms
- Actinomyces rubiginosus

Species of bacterium

Streptomyces rubiginosus is a bacterium species from the genus of Streptomyces which has been isolated from soil. Streptomyces rubiginosus produces glucose isomerase. glucose isomerase from Streptomyces rubiginosus can be used to texture fish and meat products.

== See also ==
- List of Streptomyces species
