= 2,5-Bis(hydroxymethyl)furan =

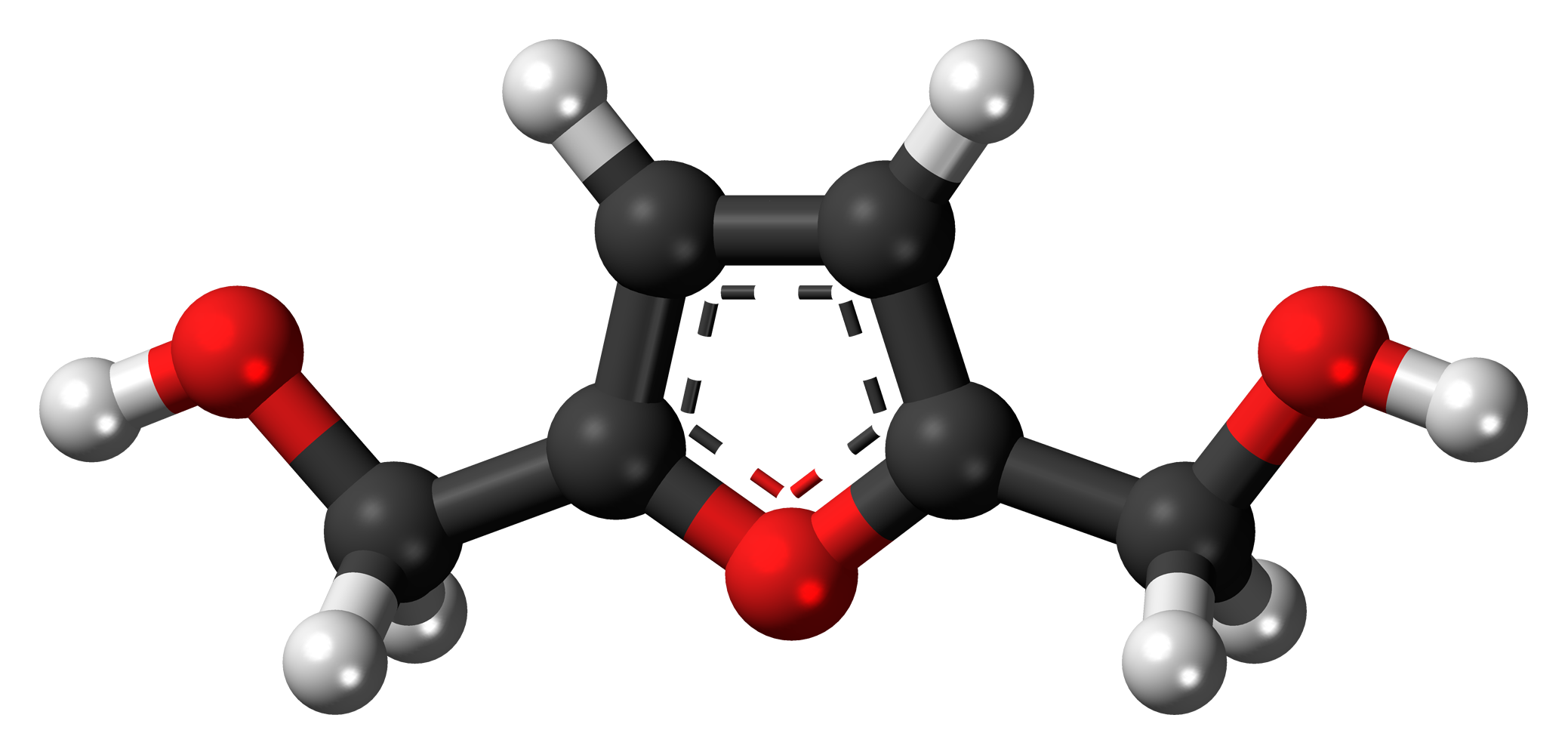

Names
- Preferred IUPAC name (Furan-2,5-diyl)dimethanol
- Other names Furan-2,5-diyldimethanol [5-(hydroxymethyl)furan-2-yl]methanol 2,5-Furandimethanol; 2,5-Bis(hydroxymethyl)furan; 2,5-Di(hydroxymethyl)furan; 5-(Hydroxymethyl)-furfuryl alcohol

Identifiers
CAS Number	1883-75-6
3D model (JSmol)	Interactive image
ChEBI	CHEBI:59984
ChemSpider	67238
ECHA InfoCard	100.015.950
PubChem CID	74663
UNII	4XE4JYN4G7
CompTox Dashboard (EPA)	DTXSID2062036
- InChI: InChI=1S/C6H8O3/c7-3-5-1-2-6(4-8)9-5/h1-2,7-8H,3-4H2 Key: DSLRVRBSNLHVBH-UHFFFAOYSA-N
- SMILES: OCc1oc(cc1)CO

Properties
Chemical formula	C_{6}H_{8}O_{3}
Molar mass	128.127 g·mol^{−1}
Appearance	white solid
Density	1.283 g/cm^{3}
Melting point	74 to 77 °C (165 to 171 °F; 347 to 350 K)
Boiling point	275 °C (527 °F; 548 K)

Hazards
Flash point	120 °C (248 °F; 393 K)

Related compounds
Related furans	Furfural; Methoxymethylfurfural
- Except where otherwise noted, data are given for materials in their standard state (at 25 °C [77 °F], 100 kPa). verify (what is ?) Infobox references

2,5-Bis(hydroxymethyl)furan (BHMF) is a heterocyclic organic compound, and is a derivative of a broader class of compounds known as furans. It is produced from cellulose and has received attention as a biofeedstock. It is a white solid, although commercial samples can appear yellowish or tan.

== Synthesis ==
2,5-BHMF may be obtained from the reduction of the formyl group of 5-hydroxymethylfurfural (HMF). HMF is the product of acid-catalyzed dehydration of fructose. Fructose is both an isomer of and a derivative of glucose, which can be derived from the hydrolysis of cellulose. The reduction is catalyzed by nickel, copper chromite, platinum oxide, cobalt oxide, or molybdenum oxide, and sodium amalgam, under high temperatures and high hydrogen pressure. Hydrogenation in the presence of a copper or platinum catalyst in an aqueous environment gives 2,5-BHMF as the main product. Under more forcing conditions, the furan ring is reduced as well, resulting in 2,5-bis(hydroxymethyl)tetrahydrofuran.

== Applications ==
Functioning as a diol, 2,5-BHF has applications in the manufacture of polyurethane foams and polyesters.
