= 2,5-Furandicarboxylic acid =

Names
- Preferred IUPAC name Furan-2,5-dicarboxylic acid
- Other names Dehydromucic acid

Identifiers
| CAS Number | 3238-40-2 |
| 3D model (JSmol) | Interactive image; Interactive image |
| ChEBI | CHEBI:78036 |
| ChemSpider | 69178 |
| ECHA InfoCard | 100.019.819 |
| PubChem CID | 76720 |
| UNII | 73C4JJ695C |
| CompTox Dashboard (EPA) | DTXSID0062927 |
- InChI: InChI=1S/C6H4O5/c7-5(8)3-1-2-4(11-3)6(9)10/h1-2H,(H,7,8)(H,9,10) Key: CHTHALBTIRVDBM-UHFFFAOYSA-N; InChI=1/C6H4O5/c7-5(8)3-1-2-4(11-3)6(9)10/h1-2H,(H,7,8)(H,9,10) Key: CHTHALBTIRVDBM-UHFFFAOYAD
- SMILES: C1=C(OC(=C1)C(=O)O)C(=O)O; O=C(O)c1oc(C(=O)O)cc1

Properties
| Chemical formula | C_{6}H_{4}O_{5} |
| Molar mass | 156.093 g·mol^{−1} |
| Appearance | White solid |
| Density | 1.604 g/cm^{3} |
| Melting point | 342 °C (648 °F; 615 K) |
| Boiling point | 420 °C (788 °F; 693 K) |
| Solubility in water | soluble in DMSO |
| Acidity (pK_{a}) | 4.38, 5.85 |

Hazards
| Flash point | 207 °C (405 °F; 480 K) |
- Except where otherwise noted, data are given for materials in their standard state (at 25 °C [77 °F], 100 kPa). verify (what is ?) Infobox references

2,5-Furandicarboxylic acid (FDCA) is an organic chemical compound consisting of two carboxylic acid groups attached to a central furan ring. It was first reported as dehydromucic acid by Rudolph Fittig and Heinzelmann in 1876, who produced it via the action of concentrated hydrobromic acid upon mucic acid. It can be produced from certain carbohydrates and as such is a renewable resource, it was identified by the US Department of Energy as one of 12 priority chemicals for establishing the "green" chemistry industry of the future. Furan-2,5-dicarboxylic acid (FDCA) has been suggested as an important renewable building block because it can substitute for terephthalic acid (PTA) in the production of polyesters and other current polymers containing an aromatic moiety.

== Synthesis of FDCA ==
Methods for the synthesis of the FDCA may be divided into four groups:

- Dehydration of hexose derivatives
- Oxidation of 2,5-disubstituted furans
- Catalytic conversions of various furan derivatives
- Biological conversion of HMF

=== Dehydration of hexose derivatives ===
First group is based on the acid-promoted triple dehydration of aldaric (mucic) acids. This reaction requires severe conditions (highly concentrated acids, temp > 120 °C, React time > 20h) and all the methods were non-selective with yields < 50%. The process has also been patented by the French company Agro Industrie Recherches et Developpements. This is also the process which DuPont and ADM are using according to patent literature.

=== Oxidation of 2,5-disubstituted furans ===
Oxidation routes of HMF into FDCA

The second class of synthesis routes include the oxidation reactions of various 2,5-disubstituted furans utilizing a variety of inorganic oxidants. Several routes to FDCA via oxidation of hydroxymethylfurfural (HMF) with air over different catalysts have been reported. Oxidation of HMF under strongly alkaline conditions over noble metal catalysts gives almost quantitative formation of FDCA. HMF and methoxymethylfurfural (MMF) oxidation was also studied with a series of conventional metal bromide catalysts (Co, Mn, Br) used for the oxidation of para-xylene to terephthalic acid. Also, the direct, one pot dehydration and oxidation of fructose to FDCA via intermediate HMF has been investigated with good selectivities, unfortunately this system does not work in water.

=== Catalytic conversions of various furan derivatives ===
The third class includes reactions describing the synthesis of FDCA from furfural. Furfural can be oxidized to 2-furoic acid with nitric acid and the latter was subsequently converted to its methyl ester. The ester was then converted via chloromethylation at position 5 to give 5-chloromethylfuroate. The latter was oxidized with nitric acid to form dimethyl 2,5-furandicarboxylate, which, after the alkaline hydrolysis gave FDCA in 50% yield. Andrisano reported that potassium 2-furoate, when heated up to 300 °C in a nitrogen atmosphere, underwent decarboxylation to furan with simultaneous carboxylation at position 5 to di-potassium 2,5-furandicarboxylate.

=== Biological conversion of HMF ===
FDCA has also been detected in human urine. A healthy human produces 3–5 mg/day. Numerous studies were undertaken to establish the metabolism of this compound and to determine the quantity, which is produced depending on the healthiness of the human. It was demonstrated that the individual quantity of produced FDCA increased after the injection of fructose. FDCA was also detected in blood plasma. Recently, the enzyme furfural/HMF oxidoreductase was isolated from the bacterium Cupriavidus basilensis HMF14. This enzyme might be able to convert HMF to FDCA using molecular oxygen, although an aldehyde dehydrogenase might also play a role. A Pseudomonas putida strain that was genetically engineered to express this enzyme can completely and selectively convert HMF to FDCA. This biocatalysis is performed in water, at ambient temperature and pressure, without toxic or polluting chemicals, making it very environmentally friendly. Several other enzymes have been described later, including HMFO. This flavin dependent oxidase catalyzes the three consecutive oxidations to form FDCA from HMF.

=== Industrial production ===
DuPont has announced the production of FDCA for use in PTF. In 2011, Avantium was the first company to build a FDCA pilot plant in Geleen, the Netherlands. Avantium has fully proven its technology to produce FDCA in this pilot plant and the company now plans to open the world's first commercial FDCA plant. Currently Avantium has begun the construction of a 5kt FDCA commercial plant in Delfzijl, the Netherlands. The plant will be finished at the end of 2023 with commercial production starting early in 2024. Ten offtake agreements have been signed.

== Properties and conversions ==
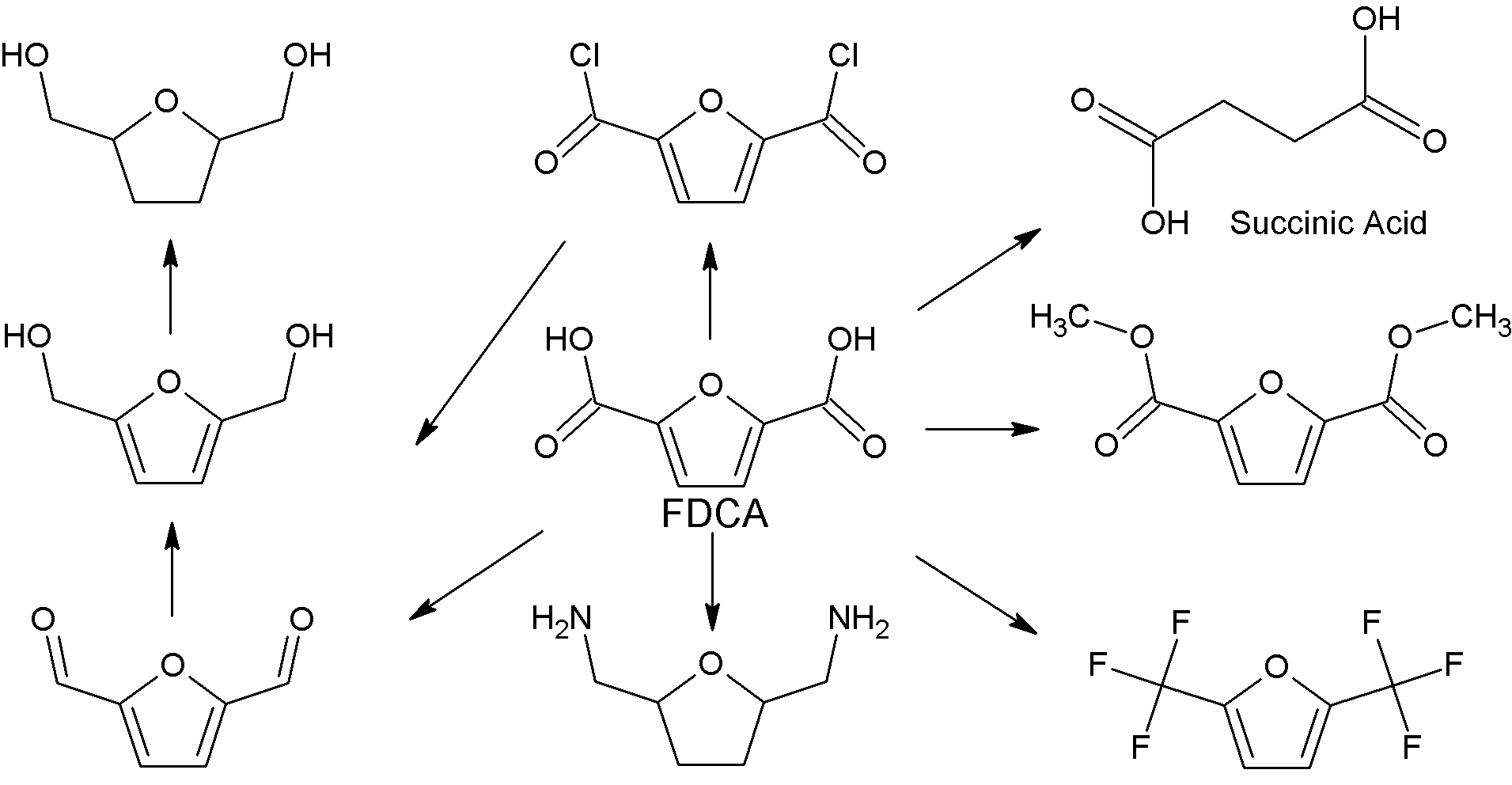
Derivatives of FDCA

FDCA is a very stable compound. Its physical properties, such as insolubility in most of common solvents and a very high melting point (it melts at 342 °C) seem to indicate intermolecular hydrogen bonding. Despite its chemical stability, FDCA undergoes reactions typical for carboxylic acids, such as halogen substitution to give carboxylic dihalides, the di-ester formation and the formation of amides. All these reactions were elaborated at the end of 19th and in the beginning of 20th century. Newer methods have been described by Janda et al., who introduced the synthesis of 2,5-furandicarboxylic dichloride, by the reaction of FDCA with thionyl chloride The synthesis of diethyl ester and dimethyl ester as well as the amidation as well as several other modifications have been reported. The versatility of FDCA is also seen in the number of derivatives available via relatively simple chemical transformations. Selective reduction can lead to partially hydrogenated products, such as 2,5 dihydroxymethylfuran, and fully hydrogenated materials, such as 2,5 bis(hydroxymethyl)tetrahydrofuran.

== Applications ==
The most important group of FDCA conversions is undoubtedly the polymerization. The potential applications of furan-based building blocks for polymer applications has been extensively reviewed by Gandini. A notable example is polyethylene 2,5-furandicarboxylate (PEF), but also other polyesters and various polyamides and polyurethanes have been described in literature. For example, PEF is only a member of the vast poly(alkylene 2,5-furandicarboxylate) family, in which FDCA is combined with diols of variable alkyl chain length (containing up to 12 methyl groups). The longer the diol alkyl chain, the higher the molecular mobility, the lower the glass transition and melting temperature, the higher the ductility

Amongst others like Dupont and Corbion, the company Avantium claims to have developed a cost-effective route to produce FDCA and the derived polyesters. FDCA has also been applied in pharmacology. It was demonstrated that its diethyl ester had a strong anaesthetic action similar to cocaine. Dicalcium 2,5-furandicarboxylate was shown to inhibit the growth of Bacillus megatorium. Screening studies on FDCA-derived anilides showed their important anti-bacterial action. The diacid itself is a strong complexing agent, chelating such ions as: Ca^{2+}, Cu^{2+} and Pb^{2+}; it is utilized in medicine to remove kidney stones. HMF is metabolized via FDCA in mammals including humans. A very diluted solution of FDCA in tetrahydrofuran is utilized for preparing artificial veins for transplantation. At the beginning of this chapter, it was mentioned that FDCA is a chemically stable compound. This property has been well benefited in industry – FDCA as most of polycarboxylic acids can be an ingredient of fire foams. Such foams help to extinguish fires in a short time caused by polar and non-polar solvents. FDCA has a large potential as a replacement for terephthalic acid, a widely used component in various polyesters, such as polyethylene terephthalate (PET) and polybutyleneterephthalate (PBT). The versatility of FDCA is also seen in the number of derivatives available via relatively simple chemical transformations. Selective reduction can lead to partially hydrogenated products, such as 2,5-dihydroxymethylfuran, and fully hydrogenated materials, such as 2,5-bis(hydroxymethyl)tetrahydrofuran. Both of these latter materials can serve as alcohol components in the production of new polyester, and their combination with FDCA would lead to a new family of completely biomass-derived products. Extension of these concepts to the production of new nylons, either through reaction of FDCA with diamines, or through the conversion of FDCA to 2,5-bis(aminomethyl)tetrahydrofuran. FDCA can also serve as a starting material for the production of succinic acid, whose utility is elsewhere.

== Technical barriers ==
The primary technical barrier in the production and use of FDCA is the development of an effective and selective dehydration process from sugars. The control of sugar dehydration could be a very powerful technology, leading to a wide range of additional, inexpensive building blocks, but it is not yet well understood. Currently, dehydration processes using hydroxymethylfurfural (HMF) as intermediate are generally non-selective, unless, immediately upon their formation, the unstable intermediate products can be transformed into more stable materials such as methoxymethylfurfural (MMF). Necessary R&D will include development of selective dehydration systems and catalysts. FDCA formation will require development of cost-effective and industrially viable oxidation technology that can operate in concert with the necessary dehydration processes.
