= Methoxymethylfurfural =

Names
- Preferred IUPAC name 5-[(Methoxy)methyl]furan-2-carbaldehyde
- Other names 5-Methoxymethyl furfural; Methoxymethylfurfurol; 5-(Methoxymethyl)furan-2-carbaldehyde; 5-Methoxymethylfurfural; 5-(Methoxymethyl)-2-furaldehyde

Identifiers
CAS Number	1917-64-2
3D model (JSmol)	Interactive image; Interactive image
ChemSpider	67284
ECHA InfoCard	100.149.478
PubChem CID	74711
UNII	5XBV4H5CX7
CompTox Dashboard (EPA)	DTXSID30172704
- InChI: InChI=1S/C7H8O3/c1-9-5-7-3-2-6(4-8)10-7/h2-4H,5H2,1H3
- SMILES: O=Cc1oc(cc1)COC; COCC1=CC=C(O1)C=O

Properties
Chemical formula	C_{7}H_{8}O_{3}
Molar mass	140.138 g·mol^{−1}
Appearance	Colorless liquid
Density	1140 kg/m^{3}
Melting point	−8 °C (18 °F; 265 K)
Boiling point	109 to 111 °C (228 to 232 °F; 382 to 384 K) at 11-12 tor

Hazards
- Occupational safety and health (OHS/OSH)
Main hazards	Skin irritation/Skin sensitizer

Related compounds
Related furan-2-carbaldehydes	Furfural; Hydroxymethylfurfural
- Except where otherwise noted, data are given for materials in their standard state (at 25 °C [77 °F], 100 kPa). Infobox references

Methoxymethylfurfural (MMF or 5-methoxymethylfuran-2-carbaldehyde) is an organic compound derived from dehydration of sugars and subsequent etherification with methanol. This colorless liquid is soluble in a wide range of solvents including lower alcohols. The molecule is a derivative of furan, containing both aldehyde and ether (methoxymethyl) functional groups. MMF has been detected in the leaves and roots of Chilean Jaborosa magellanica (Solanaceae). It has a typical odor suggestive of maraschino cherries. MMF can be made from a wide range of carbohydrate containing feedstocks including sugar, starch and cellulose using a chemical catalytic process and is a potential "carbon-neutral" feedstock for fuels and chemicals.

== Production ==
Related to the production of furfural, MMF can be produced from C-6 sugars hexoses such as glucose and fructose. It is formed via the dehydration of the hexoses and subsequent etherification of hydroxymethylfurfural (HMF). Already in 1936 a batch process was patented for the production of MMF and methyl levulinate. Bicker reported first order kinetics for the dehydration of fructose, etherification of HMF into MMF and by-products formation in methanol. An MMF yield of 78% at 99% conversion was obtained at 240°C and a residence time of 2 s. At short residence times, especially at lower temperatures significant amounts of HMF were observed and smaller amount of MMF. The amount of MMF increased with residence time at the cost of the amount of HMF, which indicates that MMF formation goes through HMF. Reactions in various alcohols by Brown et al. led to the formation of the appropriate HMF ether and levulinic acid ester. A number of primary and secondary alcohols was tested, from methanol to 2-butanol. In methanol a yield of 43% MMF was reported in combination with 47% methyl levulinate. Garves has shown that also cellulose is efficiently degraded by alcohols and strong acid-catalysts at 180°C to 200°C within minutes. In methanol methylglucosides, MMF and methyl levulinates plus methyl formates are formed in consecutive reactions, accompanied by some humic residues.

== Uses ==
The synthesis of novel biomass-based vinyl polymers from 5-methoxymethyl furfural as the starting material was described by Yoshida. HMF and MMF are also key molecules into the conversion of liquid biofuels. HMF and MMF can be converted to a wide range of mono- and dialkoxymethyl ethers. The compounds can also further converted to 2,5-dimethylfuran (DMF) and valeric biofuels. Oxidation of MMF results in the formation of 2,5-furandicarboxylic acid, which has been proposed as a replacement of terephthalic acid for the production of a wide range of plastics including polyesters and polyamides. The potential applications of furan based building blocks for polymer applications has been extensively reviewed by Gandini. Patents have appeared that MMF prevents the growth of fungi in leathers, paints, foods and fabrics and that MMF as a part of a much broader spectrum of active compounds is effective against cardio, cerebro-vascular and Alzheimer's diseases and depression. The addition of MMF and other alkoxymethyl furfurals to a tobacco product has been patented because it acts as a fragrance to provide a sweet flavor in the smoke.

== As an ingredient in food ==
Unlike HMF, MMF has not been found to a major extent in natural products and in food items. However, Podesta has shown that MMF is a constituent of the leaves and roots of Chilean Jaborosa magellanica (Griseb.) Dusen (Solanaceae). MMF occurs at concentrations of 5 mg MMF per kg dried roots and leaves. It was also present as a component of the roots of Asparagus cochinchinesis and Asparagus lucidus, however it was assumed that the A. lucidus product had been formed as an artifact from fructose during the isolation process. On the contrary EMF, the ethanol ether of HMF can be found in many alcoholic beverages such as beer and wine, especially those who still contain high sugar levels at the end of the fermentation.

== Toxicity ==
It has been claimed that 5-methoxymethyl-2-furaldehyde prevents the growth of fungi in leathers, paints, foods and fabrics. However, the first phase of REACH testing has shown that the oral LD50 value of MMF in Wistar rats was established to exceed 2000 mg/kg body weight. According to the Regulation (EC) No 1272/2008 on classification, labelling and packaging of substances and mixtures, MMF does not have to be classified and has no obligatory labelling requirement for oral toxicity. It was found that MMF gave positive results in the skin irritation test and should be classified as a skin sensitizer.

== Quantification ==
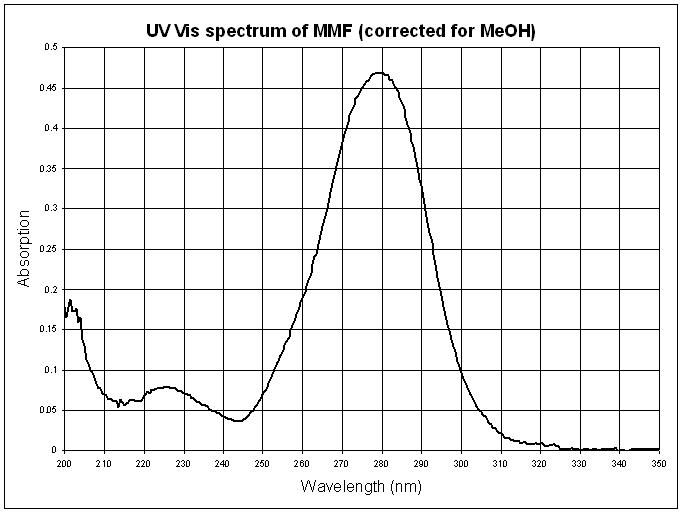
MMF UV

MMF can be quantified by using both GC and HPLC. MMF can routinely been analyzed on a GC using for example a Varian VF-WAXms column with a temperature profile up to 250˚C and FID detector. When analyzed by HPLC it can be quantified by UV. In the picture below the UV spectrum is shown. The peak maximum in methanol is at 279.5 nm (Molar extinction coefficient ε 13854 M^{−1}.cm^{−1}).

The IR sample below was recorded on a Nicolet 6700 FT-IR at room temperature using the liquid film (diamond ATR-cell) procedure.

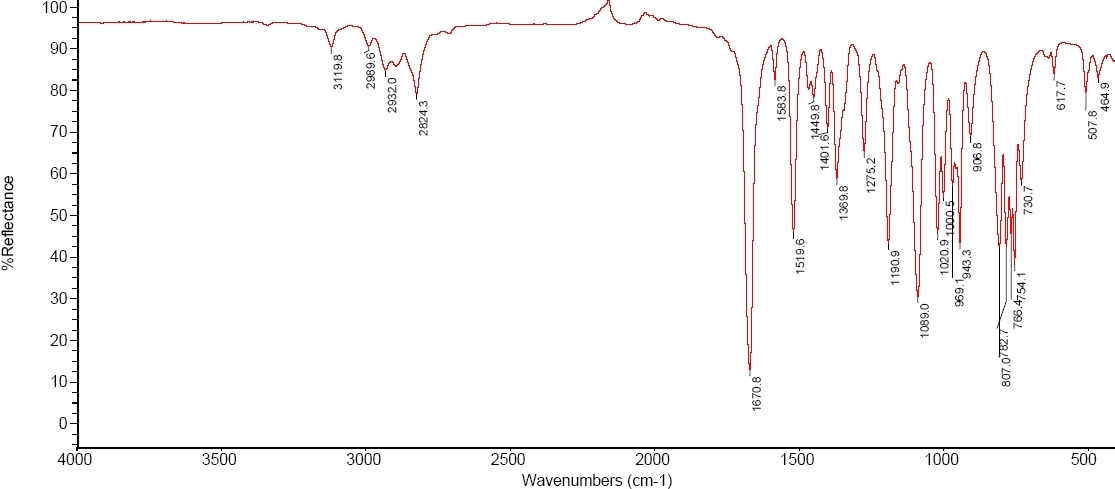

== History ==
The first publication on MMF dates from 1927, by Haworth et al., in which it was observed as a product of tetramethylfructose dehydration in an attempt to deduce the structure of sucrose. Already in 1936 a German patent was published on the production of MMF from fructose. It was later also synthesised by Wolfrom et al. from tetramethyl glucoseen. Both substrates showed an efficient conversion into MMF under aqueous acidic conditions. The first claims for industrial applications arose in the sixties.
