= Dihydrolevoglucosenone =

Names
- IUPAC name (1R,5S)-7,8-Dioxabicyclo[3.2.1]octan-2-one
- Other names Cyrene

Identifiers
CAS Number	53716-82-8
3D model (JSmol)	Interactive image
ChemSpider	9150700
ECHA InfoCard	100.234.612
EC Number	807-130-4
PubChem CID	16762483
CompTox Dashboard (EPA)	DTXSID30450332
- InChI: InChI=1S/C6H8O3/c7-5-2-1-4-3-8-6(5)9-4/h4,6H,1-3H2/t4-,6+/m0/s1 Key: WHIRALQRTSITMI-UJURSFKZSA-N
- SMILES: [C@H]12CCC([C@H](OC1)O2)=O

Properties
Chemical formula	C_{6}H_{8}O_{3}
Molar mass	128.127 g·mol^{−1}
Appearance	clear to yellowish liquid
Density	1.2473 g/cm^{3} (25 °C)
Boiling point	226 °C (439 °F; 499 K)
Solubility in water	miscible
Vapor pressure	12.98 Pa (25 °C) 14.4 Pa (25 °C)
Refractive index (n_{D})	1.4732 (20 °C)

Hazards
- GHS labelling
Pictograms	(GHS07: Exclamation mark)
Signal word	Warning
Hazard statements	H319
Precautionary statements	P305+P351+P338, P313
Flash point	108 °C (226 °F; 381 K)
Autoignition temperature	296 °C (565 °F; 569 K)
- Except where otherwise noted, data are given for materials in their standard state (at 25 °C [77 °F], 100 kPa). Infobox references

Dihydrolevoglucosenone (known also with the trade name of Cyrene) is a bicyclic, chiral, seven-membered heterocyclic cycloalkanone which is a waste derived and fully biodegradable aprotic dipolar solvent. It is an environmentally friendly alternative to dimethylformamide (DMF) and N-methyl-2-pyrrolidone (NMP).

== Preparation ==
Dihydrolevoglucosenone can be prepared through the hydrogenation of unsaturated ketone levoglucosenone (LGO) with heterogenous palladium catalysts under mild conditions. LGO is a chemical building block obtained by acid-catalyzed pyrolysis of lignocellulosic biomass such as sawdust.

Acidic pyrolysis of cellulose to yield levoglucosenone (LGO)

== Properties ==
Dihydrolevoglucosenone is a clear colorless, to light-yellow liquid with a mild, smoky ketone-like odor. It is miscible with water and many organic solvents. Dihydrolevoglucosenone has a boiling point of 226 °C at 101.325 kPa (vs 202 °C for NMP), and a vapor pressure of 12.98 Pa near room temperature (25 °C). It has a comparatively high dynamic viscosity of 14.5 cP (for comparison DMF: 0.92 cP at 20 °C, NMP: 1.67 cP at 25 °C).

The compound is stable at temperatures up to 195 °C and weak acids and bases. Dihydrolevoglucosenone can react with inorganic bases via an aldol condensation mechanism. Dihydrolevoglucosenone is readily biodegradable (99% within 14 days) and reacts to oxidants such as aqueous 30% hydrogen peroxide solution even at room temperature.

== Applications ==
=== Dihydroglucosenone as a precursor ===
Dihydrolevoglucosenone can be used as a renewable building block to produce valuable chemicals such as drugs, flavours and fragrances and specialty polymers.

As dihydrolevoglucosenone is produced as a single enantiomer, it can be used for chiral pool synthesis. For instance, oxidation with peroxy acids such as peroxyacetic acid produces optically pure 5-hydroxymethyldihydrofuranone, from which zalcitabine, formerly a HIV drug, is available.

Formation of 5-hydroxymethyldihydrofuranone [(S) - (+) - 4-hydroxymethyl-γ-butyrolactone]

In a two-step hydrogenation process with a metal catalyst – first at 60 °C then at 180 °C – 1,6-hexanediol is mainly obtained via several intermediates. 1,6-hexanediol can be used as a starting material for the production of polyesters, polyurethanes and diamine 1,6-diaminohexane.

At elevated temperature and in the presence of a palladium catalyst, hydrogenolysis of dihydrolevoglucosenone via levoglucosanol selectively yields tetrahydrofuran-2,5-dimethanol (THF-dimethanol), which is a biodegradable solvent and a bio-based precursor to 1,6-hexanediol (and 1,6-diaminohexane).

Hydrogenation of LGO zu tetrahydrofuran-2,5-dimethanol

=== Dihydroglucosenone as a safer solvent ===
The search for alternative "green" solvents made from biomass or low-cost renewable raw materials, which are accessible through high-efficiency processes, in high yields, and meet the performance of conventional solvents, has triggered intensive research activities in industry and academia worldwide.

Dihydrolevoglucosenone is considered a "green" replacement for DMF. Several standard reactions of organic chemistry, e.g. Menshutkin reaction, Sonogashira coupling, Suzuki-Miyaura coupling and the production of ureas have been carried out in dihydrolevoglucosenone.

=== Cyrene as a wood plasticizer ===
In 2026, a new research in Italy found out that this chemical compound can act as an excellent sweller for wood, thus enabling a uniform plasticization and a large deformation of intact hardwood elements.

Formation of ureas using dihydrolevoglucosenone as a solvent

== Production ==
Circa Group produces dihydrolevoglucosenone from cellulose under the Cyrene brand and has built a 50-tonne demonstration plant with partners in Tasmania. The company estimates that dihydroglucosenone performs better than NMP in 45% and comparably to NMP in 20% of trials to date. Circa received authorization in 2018 from the European Chemicals Agency (ECHA) to produce or import up to 100 tonnes per year of dihydroglucosenone to the EU.

== Literature ==
- DS van Es: Study into alternative (biobased) polar aprotic solvents. Wageningen University, Wageningen 2017 (wur.nl [PDF]).
- JH Clark, A. Hunt, C. Topi, G. Paggiola, J. Sherwood: Sustainable Solvents: Perspectives from Research, Business and Institutional Policy . Royal Society of Chemistry, London 2017, ISBN 978-1-78262-335-9 .
- Dickson Kong and Anton V. Dolzhenko. "Cyrene: A Bio-Based Sustainable Solvent for Organic Synthesis." Sustainable Chemistry and Pharmacy 25 (April 1, 2022): 100591. https://doi.org/10.1016/j.scp.2021.100591
