= Pall Mall Barbers =

Barber shop chain

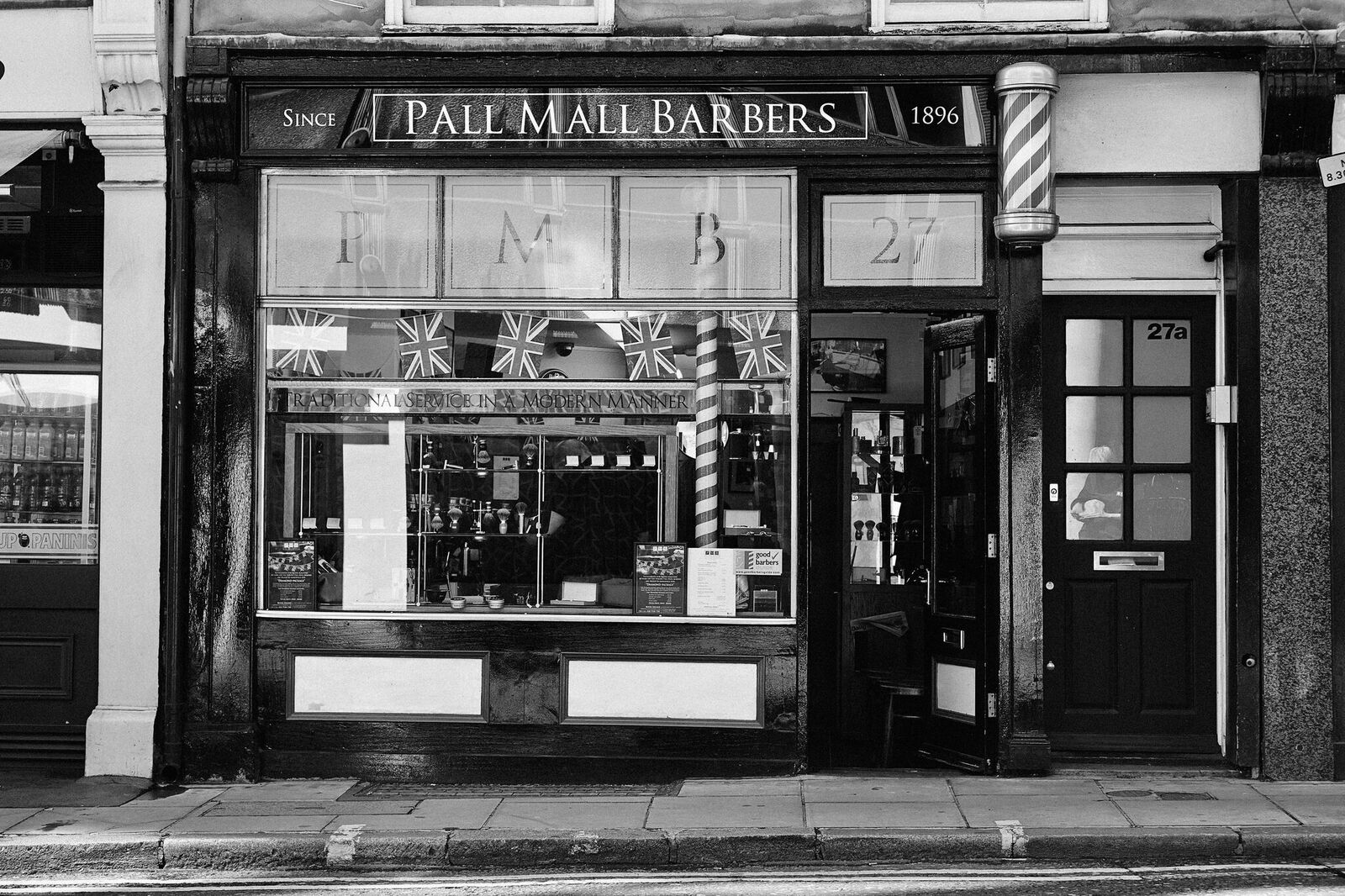
- Industry: Male grooming
- Founded: 2005; 21 years ago
- Founder: Richard Marshall
- Headquarters: London, England, United Kingdom
- Number of locations: 7
- Owner: Richard Marshall
- Website: Official website

Pall Mall Barbers is a barbershop chain with six locations in London and one in New York City. The company is owned and managed by Richard Marshall.

The first Pall Mall Barbers store is located on a historic site at 27 Whitcomb Street, near Trafalgar Square, London. Records indicate that the building has been a barber shop since the original Pall Mall Toilet Salon was established in 1896. Marshall purchased the premises in 2005 and renamed it Pall Mall Barbers.

== History ==
Pall Mall Barbers was founded by Richard Marshall in 2005 when he converted the former Pall Mall Toilet Company into the original Pall Mall Barbers location at Trafalgar Square. Marshall expanded the brand from 1 store to 7, the most recent one being in New York City.

By the end of the 2000s leading into the 2010s, the "wet shave" was experiencing a resurgence in popularity thanks to the introduction of replaceable blades in straight razors.

By early 2018, Pall Mall Barbers expanded to a further two shops in London bringing the total to six, while plans for a debut international store in New York City were also underway.

In December 2018, Pall Mall Barbers opened in New York City, at the Rockefeller Center.

=== Royal visit ===
On February 14, 2019, Prince William visited the Pall Mall Barbers Paddington location in London. According to People Magazine, Pall Mall Barbers is a member of the Lion's Barber Collective, a group of barber shops that instructs its employees in how to recognize the signs of mental illness and help prevent suicide. The training provided to these barbers is called BarbersTalk.

== Awards ==
On January 20, 2019, Pall Mall Barbers was awarded the Board of Trade Award from the British Board of Trade.

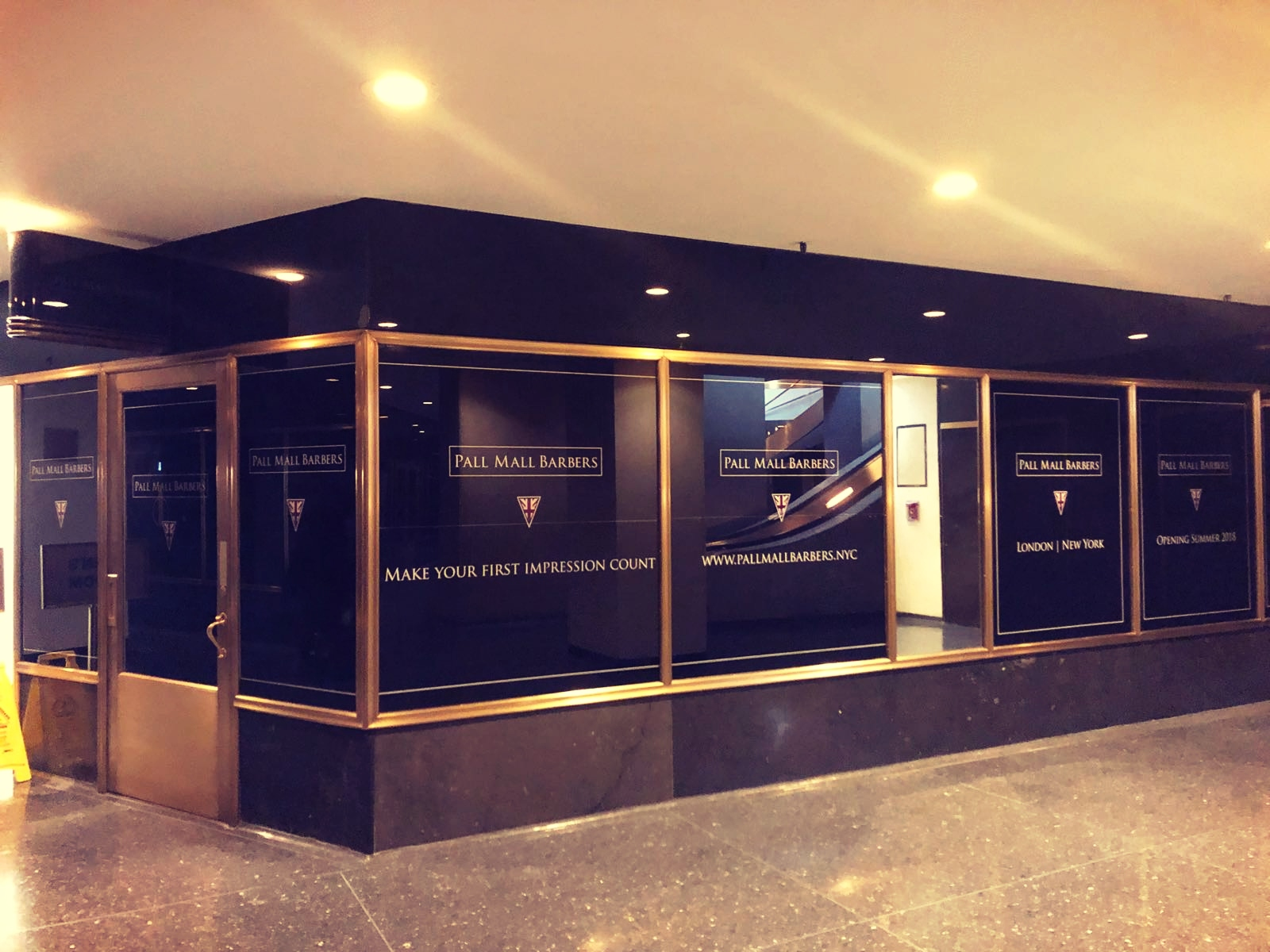
Pall Mall Barbers New York City
