= 5-Chloromethylfurfural =

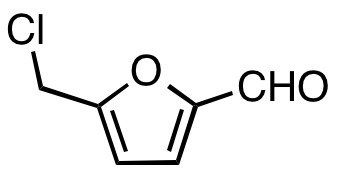

Names
- Preferred IUPAC name 5-(Chloromethyl)furan-2-carbaldehyde
- Other names 5-(Chloromethyl)-2-furaldehyde

Identifiers
CAS Number	1623-88-7
3D model (JSmol)	Interactive image
ChemSpider	66800
ECHA InfoCard	100.015.099
EC Number	216-608-6
PubChem CID	74191
UNII	MXU4UQA8XG
CompTox Dashboard (EPA)	DTXSID70167351
- InChI: InChI=1S/C6H5ClO2/c7-3-5-1-2-6(4-8)9-5/h1-2,4H,3H2 Key: KAZRCBVXUOCTIO-UHFFFAOYSA-N
- SMILES: c1cc(oc1CCl)C=O

Properties
Chemical formula	C_{6}H_{5}ClO_{2}
Molar mass	144.55 g·mol^{−1}
Appearance	Colourless liquid
Melting point	37 °C (99 °F; 310 K)

Hazards
- GHS labelling
Pictograms	(GHS05: Corrosive) (GHS07: Exclamation mark) (GHS08: Health hazard)
Signal word	Danger
Hazard statements	H227, H302, H314, H351
Precautionary statements	P203, P210, P260, P264, P264+P265, P270, P280, P301+P317, P301+P330+P331, P302+P361+P354, P304+P340, P305+P354+P338, P316, P317, P318, P321, P330, P363, P370+P378, P403, P405, P501
- Except where otherwise noted, data are given for materials in their standard state (at 25 °C [77 °F], 100 kPa). Infobox references

5-Chloromethylfurfural is an organic compound with the formula C_{4}H_{2}O(CH_{2}Cl)CHO. It consists of a furan substituted at the 2- and 5-positions with formyl (CHO) and chloromethyl (CH_{2}Cl) groups. CMF, as it is called, is obtained by dehydration of fructose and other cellulose derivatives using hydrochloric acid. It is a colourless liquid. It can be reduced to give 5-methylfurfural, and can be hydrolyzed to give hydroxymethylfurfural.

Typical nitrile gloves do not protect against CMF. The compound, even when handled as a solid, can absorb through gloves and stain the skin a dark brown black color. The health implications of dermal CMF exposure are unclear; CMF should be handled with caution.
