= 2,5-Dimethylfuran =

- Skeletal formula

- Space-filling model

Names
- Preferred IUPAC name 2,5-Dimethylfuran

Identifiers
CAS Number	625-86-5
3D model (JSmol)	Interactive image; Interactive image
ChEBI	CHEBI:89052
ChemSpider	11763
ECHA InfoCard	100.009.923
EC Number	210-914-3
PubChem CID	12266
UNII	DR5HL9OJ7Y
CompTox Dashboard (EPA)	DTXSID7022093
- InChI: InChI=1S/C6H8O/c1-5-3-4-6(2)7-5/h3-4H,1-2H3 Key: GSNUFIFRDBKVIE-UHFFFAOYSA-N; InChI=1/C6H8O/c1-5-3-4-6(2)7-5/h3-4H,1-2H3 Key: GSNUFIFRDBKVIE-UHFFFAOYAS
- SMILES: o1c(ccc1C)C; Cc1ccc(o1)C

Properties
Chemical formula	C_{6}H_{8}O
Molar mass	96.13
Appearance	Liquid
Density	0.8897 g/cm^{3}
Melting point	−62 °C (−80 °F; 211 K)
Boiling point	92 to 94 °C (198 to 201 °F; 365 to 367 K)
Solubility in water	Insoluble
Magnetic susceptibility (χ)	−66.37·10^{−6} cm^{3}/mol
Refractive index (n_{D})	1.44 – 1.442

Hazards
- Occupational safety and health (OHS/OSH)
Main hazards	Very flammable, harmful
Flash point	−1 °C (30 °F; 272 K)
Autoignition temperature	285.85 °C (546.53 °F; 559.00 K)
- Except where otherwise noted, data are given for materials in their standard state (at 25 °C [77 °F], 100 kPa). verify (what is ?) Infobox references

2,5-Dimethylfuran is a heterocyclic compound with the formula (CH_{3})_{2}C_{4}H_{2}O. Although often abbreviated DMF, it should not be confused with dimethylformamide. A derivative of furan, this simple compound is a potential biofuel, being derivable from cellulose.

== Production ==
Fructose can be converted into 2,5-dimethylfuran in a catalytic biomass-to-liquid process. The conversion of fructose to DMF proceeds via hydroxymethylfurfural.

Fructose is obtainable from glucose, a building block in cellulose.

== Potential as a biofuel ==
DMF has a number of attractions as a biofuel. It has an energy density 40% greater than that of ethanol, making it comparable to gasoline (petrol). It is also chemically stable and, being insoluble in water, does not absorb moisture from the atmosphere. Evaporating dimethylfuran during the production process also requires around one third less energy than the evaporation of ethanol, although it has a boiling point some 14 °C higher, at 92 °C, compared to 78 °C for ethanol.

The ability to efficiently and rapidly produce dimethylfuran from fructose, found in fruit and some root vegetables, or from glucose, which can be derived from starch and cellulose - all widely available in nature - adds to the attraction of dimethylfuran, although safety issues must be examined. Bioethanol and biodiesel are currently the leading liquid biofuels.

The stoichiometric air/fuel ratio of dimethylfuran is 10.72, compared to ethanol at 8.95 and gasoline at 14.56. This means that burning dimethylfuran requires approximately 33% less air than the same quantity of gasoline, but approximately 20% more air than the same quantity of ethanol.

The calorific value of liquid dimethylfuran is 33.7 MJ/kg, compared to 26.9 MJ/kg for ethanol and 43.2 MJ/kg for gasoline. The research octane number (RON) of dimethylfuran is 119. The latent heat of vaporization at 20 °C is 31.91 kJ/mol. Recent tests in a single-cylinder gasoline engine found that the thermal efficiency of burning dimethylfuran is similar to that of gasoline.

== Other uses ==
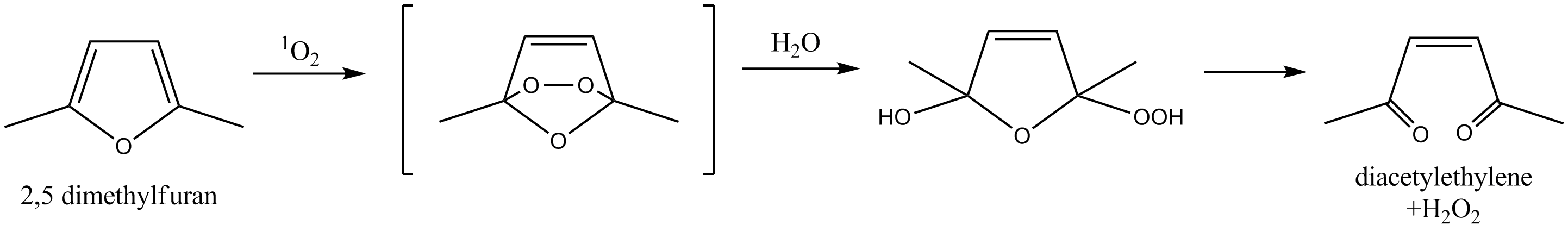
2,5-Dimethylfuran serves as a scavenger for singlet oxygen, a property which has been exploited for the determination of singlet oxygen in natural waters. The mechanism involves a Diels-Alder reaction followed by hydrolysis, ultimately leading to diacetylethylene and hydrogen peroxide as products. More recently, furfuryl alcohol has been used for the same purpose.

2,5-Dimethylfuran has also been proposed as an internal standard for NMR spectroscopy. 2,5-Dimethylfuran has singlets in its ^{1}H NMR spectrum at δ 2.2 and 5.8; the singlets give reliable integrations, while the positions of the peaks do not interfere with many analytes. The compound also has an appropriate boiling point of 92 °C which prevents evaporative losses, yet is easily removed.

== Role in food chemistry ==
2,5-Dimethylfuran forms upon thermal degradation of some sugars and has been identified in trace amounts as a component of caramelized sugars.

== Toxicology ==
2,5-Dimethylfuran plays a role in the mechanism for the neurotoxicity of hexane in humans. Together with hexane-2,5-dione and 4,5-dihydroxy-2-hexanone, it is one of the main metabolites of hexane.

2,5-Dimethylfuran has been identified as one of the components of cigar smoke with low ciliary toxicity (ability to adversely affect the cilia in the respiratory tract that are responsible for removing foreign particles). Its blood concentration can be used as a biomarker for smoking.

Comparison of Safety Data Sheets shows that human handling of 2,5-dimethylfuran is approximately as hazardous as handling gasoline.
