= Flavor and Extract Manufacturers Association =

The Flavor and Extract Manufacturers Association (FEMA) is a food industry trade group based in the United States. FEMA was founded in 1909 by several flavor firms in response to the passage of the Pure Food and Drug Act of 1906. Founding members were McCormick & Company, Ulman Driefus & Company, Jones Brothers, Blanke Baer Chemical Company, Frank Tea & Spice Company, Foote & Jenkes, Sherer Gillett Company, and C.F. Sauer Company.

Since its founding, FEMA has played instrumental roles in creating a program to assess the safety and "generally recognized as safe" status of flavor ingredients, advocating for policies that positively impact the food and flavor industry, and in representing its members' interests during the creation of the Food Additives Amendment of 1958, an amendment to the United States' Food, Drugs, and Cosmetic Act of 1938.

FEMA maintains a Flavor Ingredient Library, a list of all flavoring ingredients allowed in the United States.

Critics of FEMA have said that the organization and the safety assessments it makes lack transparency. The Center for Science in the Public Interest has written that the Flavor and Extract Manufacturers Association typically makes determinations that substances are generally recognized as safe without FDA oversight, and that the process is often secretive.

== See also ==
- Food safety
