= Hydroxymethylfurfural =

Chemical compound

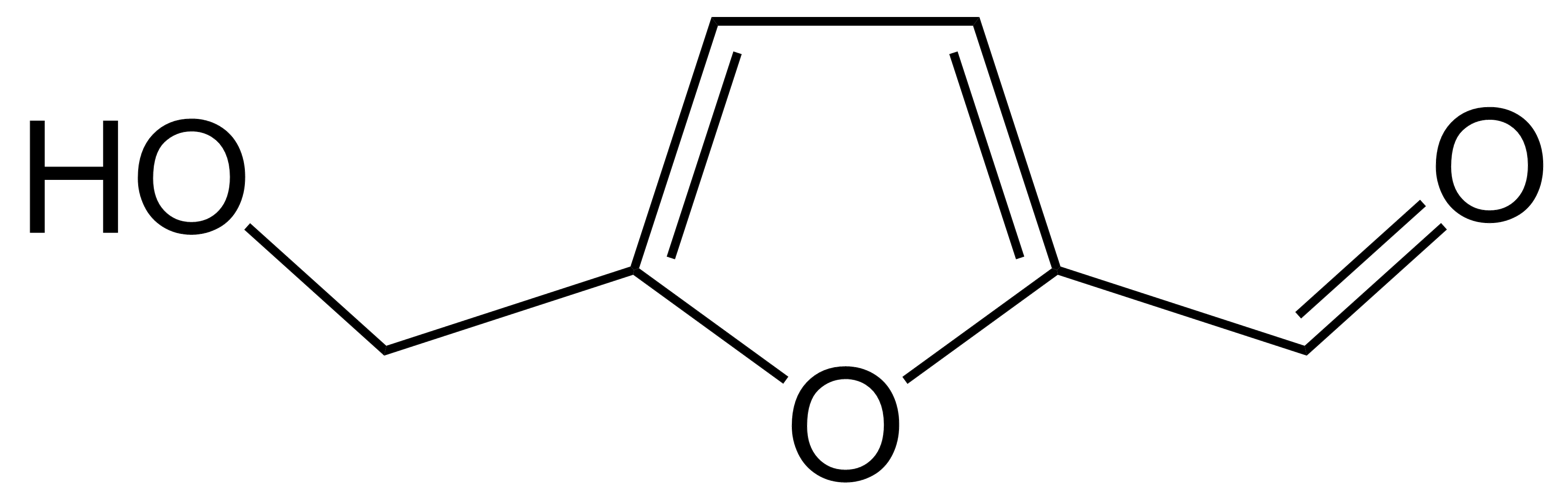
- Hydroxymethylfurfural

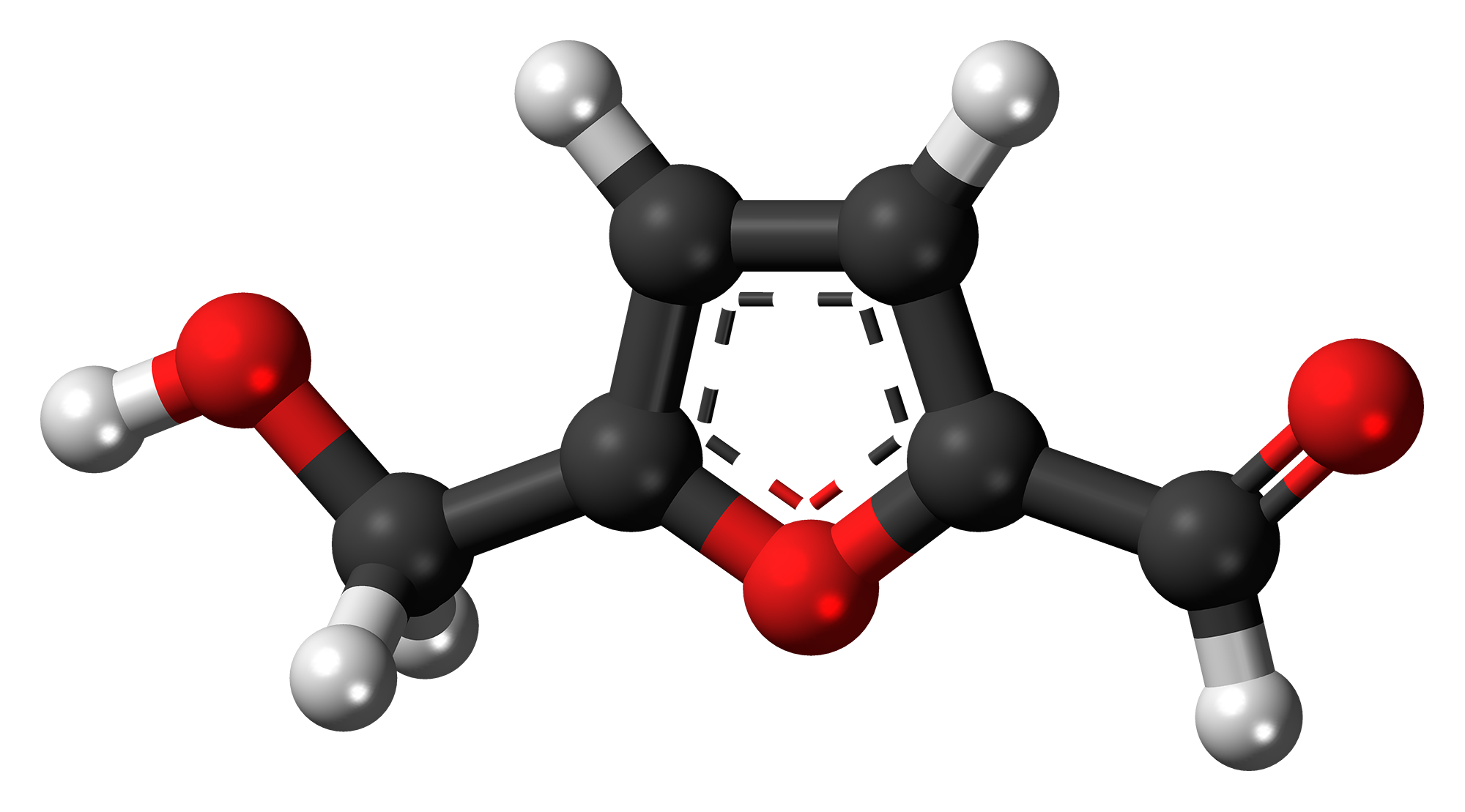

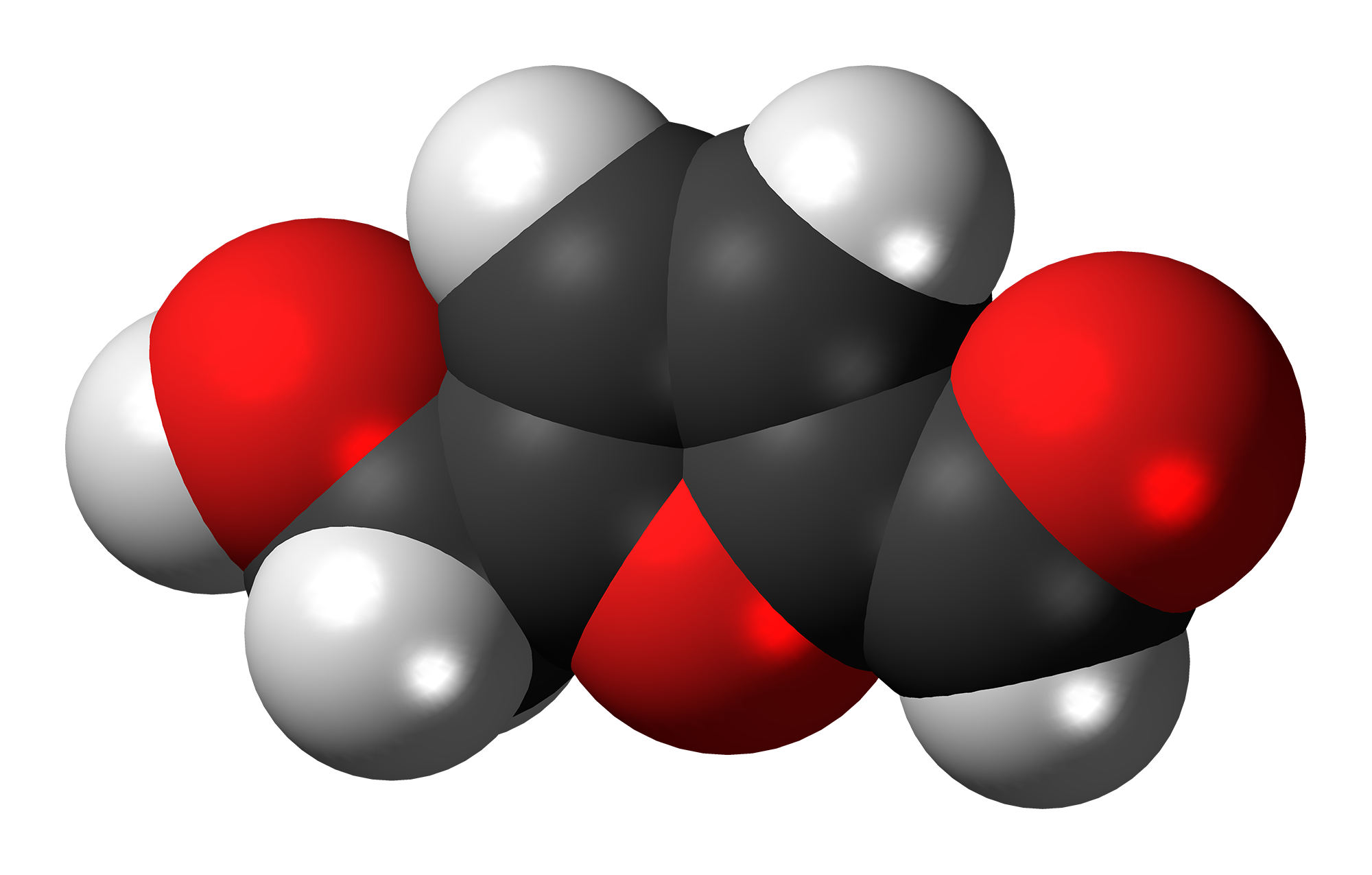

Names
- Preferred IUPAC name 5-(Hydroxymethyl)furan-2-carbaldehyde
- Other names 5-(Hydroxymethyl)-2-furaldehyde; 5-(Hydroxymethyl)furfural

Identifiers
CAS Number	67-47-0
3D model (JSmol)	Interactive image
Beilstein Reference	110889
ChEBI	CHEBI:412516
ChEMBL	ChEMBL185885
ChemSpider	207215
ECHA InfoCard	100.000.595
EC Number	200-654-9
Gmelin Reference	278693
KEGG	C11101
PubChem CID	237332
UNII	70ETD81LF0
CompTox Dashboard (EPA)	DTXSID3030428
- InChI: InChI=1S/C6H6O3/c7-3-5-1-2-6(4-8)9-5/h1-3,8H,4H2 Key: NOEGNKMFWQHSLB-UHFFFAOYSA-N; InChI=1/C6H6O3/c7-3-5-1-2-6(4-8)9-5/h1-3,8H,4H2 Key: NOEGNKMFWQHSLB-UHFFFAOYAB
- SMILES: c1cc(oc1CO)C=O

Properties
Chemical formula	C_{6}H_{6}O_{3}
Molar mass	126.111 g·mol^{−1}
Appearance	Low melting white solid
Odor	Buttery, caramel
Density	1.29 g/cm^{3}
Melting point	30 to 34 °C (86 to 93 °F; 303 to 307 K)
Boiling point	114 to 116 °C (237 to 241 °F; 387 to 389 K) (1 mbar)
UV-vis (λ_{max})	284 nm

Related compounds
Related furan-2-carbaldehydes	Furfural Methoxymethylfurfural

Hazards
- GHS labelling
Pictograms	(GHS07: Exclamation mark)
Signal word	Warning
Hazard statements	H315, H319, H335
Precautionary statements	P261, P305+P351+P338, P310
- Except where otherwise noted, data are given for materials in their standard state (at 25 °C [77 °F], 100 kPa). verify (what is ?) Infobox references

Hydroxymethylfurfural (HMF), also known as 5-(hydroxymethyl)furfural, is an organic compound formed by the dehydration of reducing sugars. It is a white low-melting solid (although commercial samples are often yellow) which is highly soluble in both water and organic solvents. The molecule consists of a furan ring, containing both aldehyde and alcohol functional groups.

HMF can form in sugar-containing food, particularly as a result of heating or cooking. Its formation has been the topic of significant study as HMF was regarded as being potentially carcinogenic to humans. However, so far in vivo genotoxicity was negative. No relevance for humans concerning carcinogenic and genotoxic effects can be derived. HMF is classified as a food improvement agent and is primarily being used in the food industry in form of a food additive as a biomarker as well as a flavoring agent for food products. It is also produced industrially on a modest scale as a carbon-neutral feedstock for the production of fuels and other chemicals.

== Production and reactions ==
HMF was first reported in 1875 as an intermediate in the formation of levulinic acid from sugar and sulfuric acid. This remains the classical route, with 6-carbon sugars (hexoses) such as fructose undergoing acid catalyzed poly-dehydration. When hydrochloric acid is used 5-chloromethylfurfural is produced instead of HMF. Similar chemistry is seen with 5-carbon sugars (pentoses), which react with aqueous acid to form furfural.

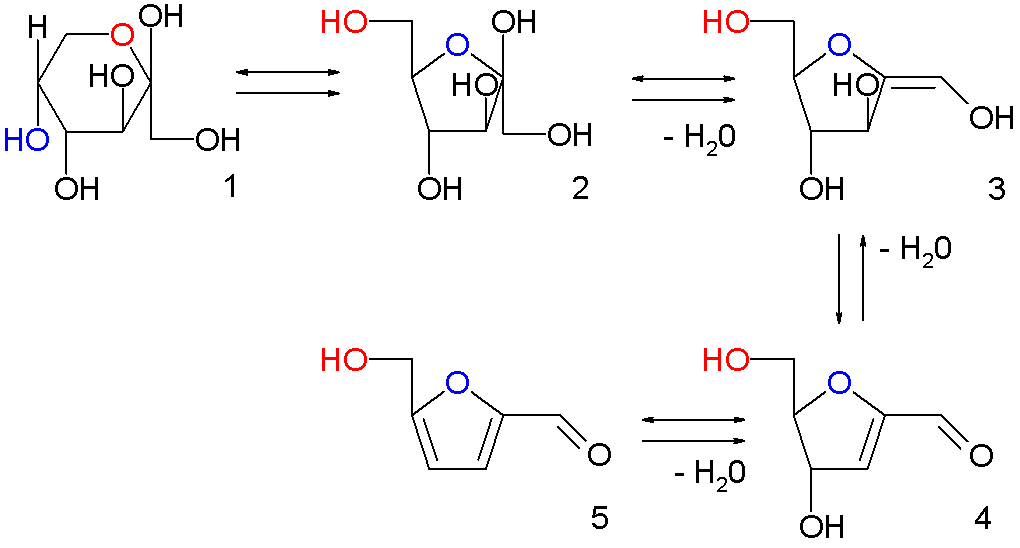
fructopyranose 1, fructofuranose 2, two intermediate stages of dehydration (not isolated) 3,4 and finally HMF 5

The classical approach tends to suffer from poor yields as HMF continues to react in aqueous acid, forming levulinic acid. As sugar is not generally soluble in solvents other than water, the development of high-yielding reactions has been slow and difficult; hence while furfural has been produced on a large scale since the 1920s, HMF was not produced on a commercial scale until over 90 years later. The first production plant coming online in 2013. Numerous synthetic technologies have been developed, including the use of ionic liquids, microdroplets, continuous liquid-liquid extraction, reactive distillation, and solid acid catalysts to either remove the HMF before it reacts further or to otherwise promote its formation and inhibit its decomposition.

=== Derivatives ===
HMF itself has few applications. It can however be converted into other more useful compounds. Of these the most important is 2,5-furandicarboxylic acid, which has been proposed as a replacement for terephthalic acid in the production of polyesters. HMF can be converted to 2,5-dimethylfuran (DMF), a liquid that is a potential biofuel with a greater energy content than bioethanol. Hydrogenation of HMF gives 2,5-bis(hydroxymethyl)furan. Acid-catalysed hydrolysis converts HMF into gamma-hydroxyvaleric acid and gamma-valerolactone, with loss of formic acid.

== Occurrence in food ==
HMF is practically absent in fresh food but is naturally generated in sugar-containing food during heat treatments like drying or cooking. Along with many other flavor- and color-related substances, HMF is formed in the Maillard reaction as well as during caramelization. In these foods it is also slowly generated during storage. Acid conditions favour generation of HMF. HMF is a well known component of baked goods. Upon toasting bread, the amount increases from 15 (5 min) to 2000 mg/kg (60 min). It is also formed during coffee roasting, with up to 769 mg/kg.

It is a good wine storage time−temperature marker, especially in sweet wines such as Madeira and those sweetened with grape concentrate arrope.

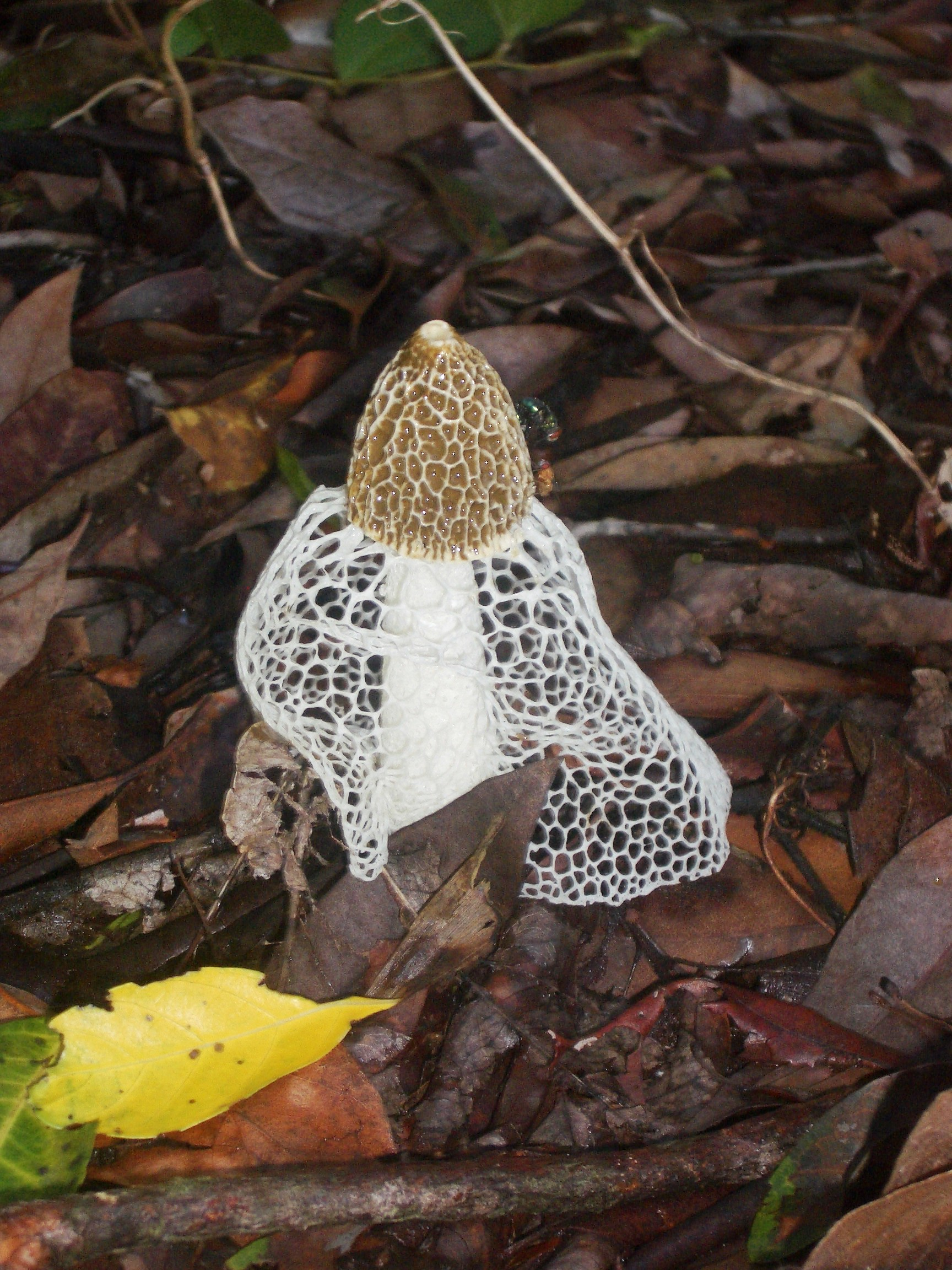
Phallus indusiatus. Cooktown, Queensland, Australia. The fruiting body contains hydroxymethylfurfural.

HMF can be found in low amounts in honey, fruit-juices and UHT-milk. Here, as well as in vinegars, jams, alcoholic products or biscuits, HMF can be used as an indicator for excess heat treatment. For instance, fresh honey contains less than 15 mg/kg, depending on pH value and temperature and age, and the codex alimentarius standard requires that honey have less than 40 mg/kg HMF to guarantee that the honey has not undergone heating during processing, except for tropical honeys, which must be below 80 mg/kg.

Higher quantities of HMF are found naturally in coffee and dried fruits. Several types of roasted coffee contained 300–2900 mg/kg HMF. Dried plums were found to contain up to 2200 mg/kg HMF. In dark beer, 13 mg/kg were found, bakery-products contained 4–150 mg/kg HMF.

It can be found in glucose syrup.

HMF can form in high-fructose corn syrup (HFCS), levels around 20 mg/kg HMF were found, increasing during storage or heating. This is a problem for American beekeepers because they use HFCS as a source of sugar when there are not enough nectar sources to feed honeybees, and HMF is toxic to them. Adding bases such as soda ash or potash to neutralize the HFCS slows the formation of HMF.

Depending on production technology and storage, levels in food vary considerably. To evaluate the contribution of a food to HMF intake, its consumption pattern has to be considered. Coffee is the food that has a very high relevance in terms of levels of HMF and quantities consumed.

HMF is a natural component in heated food but usually present in low concentrations. The daily intake of HMF may underlie high variations due to individual consumption-patterns. It has been estimated that the intakes range between 4 and 30 mg per person per day, while an intake of up to 350 mg can result from, e.g., beverages made from dried plums.

== Biomedical ==
A major metabolite in humans is 5-hydroxymethyl-2-furoic acid (HMFA), also known as Sumiki's acid, which is excreted in urine.

HMF bind intracellular sickle hemoglobin (HbS). Preliminary in vivo studies using transgenic sickle mice showed that orally administered 5HMF inhibits the formation of sickled cells in the blood. Under the development code Aes-103, HMF has been considered for the treatment of sickle cell disease.

== Quantification ==
Today, HPLC with UV-detection is the reference-method (e.g. DIN 10751–3). Classic methods for the quantification of HMF in food use photometry. The method according to White is a differential UV-photometry with and without sodium bisulfite-reduction of HMF. Winkler photometric method is a colour-reaction using p-toluidine and barbituric acid (DIN 10751–1). Photometric test may be unspecific as they may detect also related substances, leading to higher results than HPLC-measurements. Test-kits for rapid analyses are also available (e.g. Reflectoquant HMF, Merck KGaA).

== Other ==
HMF is an intermediate in the titration of hexoses in the Molisch's test. In the related Bial's test for pentoses, the hydroxymethylfurfural from hexoses may give a muddy-brown or gray solution, but this is easily distinguishable from the green color of pentoses.

Acetoxymethyl furfural (AMF) is also bio-derived green platform chemicals as an alternative to HMF.
