= High-fructose corn syrup =

Processed corn syrup

Structural formulae (Fischer projections) of fructose (left) and glucose (right)

In food science and food engineering, high-fructose corn syrup (HFCS), glucose–fructose syrup (Note: As with the term glucose syrup, "glucose-fructose syrup" also includes compositionally similar syrups not made from corn starch, e.g. from Jerusalem artichoke where the inulin naturally provides a high fructose content. A related term, also used in this context, is high-fructose syrup.) or isoglucose (Note: Refers to any glucose-fructose syrup produced by isomerization of glucose. Also high fructose starch syrup.) is a sweetener made from corn, typically produced via industrial applications of enzyme. Conventional corn syrup is first produced by enzymatic break down of corn starch into glucose, part of which is further converted into fructose using D-xylose isomerase. HFCS was first marketed in the early 1970s by the Clinton Corn Processing Company, together with the Japanese Agency of Industrial Science and Technology, where the enzyme was discovered in 1965.

HFCS is generally sold in two fructose concentrations, 42% and 55%, the rest being glucose. 42% HFCS is mainly used for processed foods and breakfast cereals, whereas 55% HFCS is used mostly for production of soft drinks. As a sweetener, HFCS is similar to granulated table sugar (which is generally 50% fructose and 50% glucose, conjoined as sucrose). Manufacturing advantages of HFCS over granulated sugar include that it is cheaper and easier to work with, especially as it can be directly pumped as a liquid with less labor involved.

The United States Food and Drug Administration (FDA) states that it is not aware of evidence showing that HFCS is less safe than traditional sweeteners such as sucrose and honey. Like any sugar, it should not be consumed to excess. As of 2026, there is no scientific consensus that fructose or HFCS impacts cardiometabolic health when substituted for table sugar. Uses and exports of HFCS from American producers have grown steadily during the early 21st century.

== Uses ==
In the United States, HFCS is among the sweeteners that have mostly replaced sucrose (table sugar) in the food industry. Factors contributing to the increased use of HFCS in food manufacturing include production quotas of domestic sugar, import tariffs on foreign sugar, and subsidies of U.S. corn, raising the price of sucrose and reducing that of HFCS, creating a manufacturing-cost advantage among sweetener applications. In spite of having a 10% greater fructose content, the relative sweetness of HFCS 55, used most commonly in soft drinks, is comparable to that of sucrose. HFCS provides advantages in food and beverage manufacturing, such as simplicity of formulation, stability, and enabling processing efficiencies.

HFCS (or standard corn syrup) is the primary ingredient in most brands of commercial "pancake syrup," as a less expensive substitute for maple syrup. Assays to detect adulteration of sweetened products with HFCS, such as liquid honey, use differential scanning calorimetry and other advanced testing methods.

== Production ==
=== Process ===
In the contemporary process, corn is milled to extract corn starch and an acid–enzyme process is used, in which the corn-starch solution is acidified to begin breaking up the existing carbohydrates. High-temperature enzymes are added to further metabolize the starch and convert the resulting sugars to fructose. The first enzyme added is alpha-amylase, which breaks the long chains down into shorter sugar chains (oligosaccharides). Glucoamylase is mixed in and converts them to glucose (with some unconverted oligosaccharides). The resulting solution is filtered to remove protein using activated carbon. Then the solution is demineralized using ion-exchange resins. That purified solution is then run over immobilized xylose isomerase, which converts glucose into fructose, resulting in a mixture of ~50–52% glucose and 42% fructose; demineralized and again purified using activated carbon, the result is HFCS 42. Some is processed into HFCS 90 by liquid chromatography, and then mixed with HFCS 42 to form HFCS 55. The enzymes used in the process are made by microbial fermentation.

=== Composition and varieties ===
HFCS is 24% water, the rest being mainly fructose and glucose with 0–5% unprocessed glucose oligomers.

The most common forms of HFCS used for food and beverage manufacturing contain fructose in either 42% ("HFCS 42") or 55% ("HFCS 55") by dry weight, as described in the U.S. Code of Federal Regulations (21 CFR 184.1866).

- HFCS 42 (approx. 42% fructose if water were ignored) is used in beverages, processed foods, cereals, and baked goods.
- HFCS 55 is mostly used in soft drinks.
- HFCS 70 is used in filling jellies.

== Commerce and consumption ==
Consumption of sugar and corn-based sweeteners in the United States from 1966 to 2013, in dry-basis pounds per capita

The global market for HFCS is expected to grow from $5.9 billion in 2019 to a projected $7.6 billion in 2024.

=== China ===
HFCS in China makes up about 20% of sweetener demand. HFCS has gained popularity due to rising prices of sucrose, while selling for a third the price. Production was estimated to reach 4,150,000 tonnes in 2017. About half of total produced HFCS is exported to the Philippines, Indonesia, Vietnam, and India. HFCS is known as guǒ pú táng jiāng (果葡糖浆; 'glucose–fructose syrup') in Chinese ingredient labels and gāo guǒ táng jiāng (高果糖浆; 'high-fructose syrup') in the Chinese food industry.

=== European Union ===
In the European Union (EU), HFCS is known as isoglucose or glucose–fructose syrup (GFS), which has 20–30% fructose content compared to 42% (HFCS 42) and 55% (HFCS 55) in the United States. While HFCS is produced exclusively with corn in the U.S., manufacturers in the EU use corn and wheat to produce GFS. GFS was once subject to a sugar production quota, which was abolished on 1 October 2017, removing the previous production cap of 720,000 tonnes, and allowing production and export without restriction. Use of GFS in soft drinks is limited in the EU because manufacturers do not have a sufficient supply of GFS containing at least 42% fructose content. As a result, soft drinks are primarily sweetened by sucrose, which has a 50% fructose content.

=== Japan ===
In Japan, HFCS is also referred to as iseika-to (異性化糖, isomerized sugar). HFCS production arose in Japan after government policies created a rise in the price of sugar. Japanese HFCS is manufactured mostly from imported U.S. corn, and the output is regulated by the government. For the period from 2007 to 2012, HFCS had a 27–30% share of the Japanese sweetener market. Japan consumed approximately 800,000 tonnes of HFCS in 2016. The United States Department of Agriculture states that HFCS is produced in Japan from U.S. corn. Japan imports at a level of 3 million tonnes per year, leading 20 percent of corn imports to be for HFCS production.

=== Mexico ===
Mexico is the largest importer of U.S. HFCS. HFCS accounts for about 27 percent of total sweetener consumption, with Mexico importing 983,069 tonnes of HFCS in 2018. Mexico's soft drink industry is shifting from sugar to HFCS which is expected to boost U.S. HFCS exports to Mexico according to a U.S. Department of Agriculture Foreign Agricultural Service report.

On 1 January 2002, Mexico imposed a 20% beverage tax on soft drinks and syrups not sweetened with cane sugar. The United States challenged the tax, appealing to the World Trade Organization (WTO). On 3 March 2006, the WTO ruled in favor of the U.S. citing the tax as discriminatory against U.S. imports of HFCS without being justified under WTO rules.

=== Philippines ===
The Philippines was the largest importer of Chinese HFCS before 2018. Imports of HFCS would peak at 373,137 tonnes in 2016. Complaints from domestic sugar producers would result in a crackdown on Chinese exports. On 1 January 2018, the Philippine government imposed a tax of 12 pesos ($.24) on drinks sweetened with HFCS versus 6 pesos ($.12) for drinks sweetened with other sugars.

=== United States ===
In the United States, HFCS has been widely used in food manufacturing since the 1970s, primarily as a replacement for sucrose because of its similar sweetness. HFCS improved manufacturing quality, was easier to use, and was cheaper. Domestic production of HFCS increased from 2.2 million tons in 1980 to a peak of 9.5 million tons in 1999. Although HFCS use is about the same as sucrose use in the United States, more than 90% of sweeteners used in global manufacturing is sucrose.

Production of HFCS in the United States was 8.3 million tons in 2017. HFCS is easier to handle than granulated sucrose, although some sucrose is transported as solution. Unlike sucrose, HFCS cannot be hydrolyzed, but the free fructose in HFCS may produce hydroxymethylfurfural when stored at high temperatures; these differences are most prominent in acidic beverages. Soft drink makers such as Coca-Cola and Pepsi continue to use sugar in other nations but transitioned to HFCS for U.S. markets in 1980 before completely switching over in 1984. Large corporations, such as Archer Daniels Midland, lobby for the continuation of government corn subsidies.

Consumption of HFCS in the U.S. has declined since it peaked at 37.5 lb (17.0 kg) per person in 1999. The average American consumed approximately 22.1 lb (10.0 kg) of HFCS in 2018, versus 40.3 lb (18.3 kg) of refined cane and beet sugar. This decrease in domestic consumption of HFCS resulted in a push in exporting of the product. In 2014, exports of HFCS were valued at $436 million, a decrease of 21% in one year, with Mexico receiving about 75% of the export volume.

In 2010, the Corn Refiners Association petitioned the FDA to call HFCS "corn sugar," but the petition was denied.

=== Vietnam ===
90% of Vietnam's HFCS import comes from China and South Korea. Imports would total 89,343 tonnes in 2017. One ton of HFCS was priced at $398 in 2017, while one ton of sugar would cost $702. HFCS has a zero cent import tax and no quota, while sugarcane under quota has a 5% tax, and white and raw sugar not under quota have an 85% and 80% tax. In 2018, the Vietnam Sugarcane and Sugar Association (VSSA) called for government intervention on current tax policies. According to the VSSA, sugar companies face tighter lending policies which cause the association's member companies with increased risk of bankruptcy.

== Health ==
High-fructose corn syrup
Nutritional value per 100 g (3.5 oz)
- Energy: 1,176 kJ (281 kcal)
- Carbohydrates: 76 g
- Sugars: 76 g
- Dietary fiber: 0 g
- Fat: 0 g
- Protein: 0 g
Vitamins and minerals
Vitamins	Quantity %DV^{†}
Riboflavin (B2)	1% 0.019 mg
Niacin (B3)	0% 0 mg
Pantothenic acid (B5)	0% 0.011 mg
Vitamin B6	1% 0.024 mg
Folate (B9)	0% 0 μg
Vitamin C	0% 0 mg
Minerals	Quantity %DV^{†}
Calcium	0% 6 mg
Iron	2% 0.42 mg
Magnesium	0% 2 mg
Phosphorus	0% 4 mg
Potassium	0% 0 mg
Sodium	0% 2 mg
Zinc	2% 0.22 mg
- Other constituents: Quantity
- Water: 24 g
- Full report from USDA National Nutrient Database
- ^{†}Percentages estimated using US recommendations for adults, except for potassium, which is estimated based on expert recommendation from the National Academies.

=== Nutrition ===
HFCS is 76% carbohydrates and 24% water, containing no fat, protein, or micronutrients in significant amounts. In a 100-gram reference amount, it supplies 281 calories, while in one tablespoon of 19 grams, it supplies 53 calories.

=== Metabolic syndrome and obesity ===
The role of fructose in metabolic syndrome has been the subject of controversy about whether HFCS consumed in typical amounts is a direct contributor to disease or if overall calorie intake is more significant. As of 2026, there is no scientific consensus or regulatory concern that fructose or HFCS impacts cardiometabolic health when substituted for sucrose.

Excessive HFCS consumption, like that of other sugar, is a risk factor for type 2 diabetes, elevation of blood lipids, and obesity. However, a specific cause-and-effect relationship of fructose in the onset of metabolic syndrome remains undetermined in epidemiological studies. In Europe, high fructose intake (more than 20% of daily food energy) is not reflective of a typical daily diet, with one consumer organisation stating that proof of a direct fructose effect on metabolic syndrome or obesity has not been shown.

A 2014 systematic review found little evidence for an association between HFCS consumption and liver diseases, enzyme levels or fat content. A 2018 review found that lowering consumption of sugary beverages and fructose products may reduce hepatic fat accumulation, which is associated with non-alcoholic fatty liver disease.

Excess HFCS consumption may lead to obesity, but it does not appear to be solely or uniquely responsible for the obesity epidemic. Countries which use the least amount of HFCS have some of the highest obesity rates in the world. HFCS consumption has decreased in the United States, while obesity rates have continued to climb. When HFCS is removed from consumer products, it is generally replaced with other equally sugary substances, which does not resolve the underlying excess sugar consumption.

=== Safety ===
Since 2014, the United States FDA has determined that HFCS is safe (GRAS) as an ingredient for food and beverage manufacturing, and there is no evidence that retail HFCS products differ in safety from those containing alternative nutritive sweeteners.

In 2026, the American Heart Association recommended that people limit total sugar consumption – without singling out HFCS – to nine teaspoons (45 ml) per day for men and six teaspoons (30 ml) for women. The Dietary Guidelines for Americans 2020-2025 recommended that added sugars should be limited in the diet, and that HFCS is the typical sugar added in large amounts to sweetened sodas, lemonade, or iced tea.

=== Manufacturing concerns ===
One consumer concern about HFCS is that processing of corn is more complex than used for common sugar sources, such as fruit juice concentrates or agave nectar, but all sweetener products derived from raw materials involve similar processing steps of pulping, hydrolysis, enzyme treatment, and filtration, among other common steps of sweetener manufacturing from natural sources. In the contemporary process to make HFCS, an "acid-enzyme" step is used in which the corn starch solution is acidified to digest the existing carbohydrates, then enzymes are added to further metabolize the corn starch and convert the resulting sugars to their constituents of fructose and glucose. Analyses published in 2014 showed that HFCS content of fructose was consistent across samples from 80 randomly selected carbonated beverages sweetened with HFCS.

A concern in manufacturing was whether HFCS contains reactive carbonyl compounds or advanced glycation end-products evolved during processing. This concern was dismissed, however, with evidence that HFCS poses no dietary risk from these compounds.

As late as 2004, some factories manufacturing HFCS used a chlor-alkali corn processing method which, in cases of applying mercury cell technology for digesting corn raw material, left trace residues of mercury in some batches of HFCS. In a 2009 release, The Corn Refiners Association stated that all factories in the American industry for manufacturing HFCS had used mercury-free processing over several previous years, making the prior report outdated.

== Other ==
=== Taste difference ===
Most countries, including Mexico, use sucrose, or table sugar, in soft drinks. In the U.S., soft drinks, such as Coca-Cola, are typically made with HFCS 55. Some Americans seek out drinks such as Mexican Coca-Cola in ethnic groceries because they prefer the taste over that of HFCS-sweetened Coca-Cola. Kosher-for-Passover Coca-Cola, sold in the U.S. around the Jewish holiday of Passover, also uses sucrose rather than HFCS.

=== Beekeeping ===
In apiculture in the United States, HFCS is a honey substitute for some managed honey bee colonies during times when nectar is in low supply. However, when HFCS is heated to about 45 °C (113 °F), hydroxymethylfurfural, which is toxic to bees, can form from the breakdown of fructose. Although some researchers cite honey substitution with HFCS as one factor among many for colony collapse disorder, there is no evidence that HFCS is the only cause. Compared to hive honey, both HFCS and sucrose caused signs of malnutrition in bees fed with them, apparent in the expression of genes involved in protein metabolism and other processes affecting honey bee health. The difference between the effects of HFCS and sucrose diets on bee gene expression is very subtle in comparing to their differences from honey.

=== Public relations ===
There are various public relations concerns with HFCS, including how HFCS products are advertised and labeled as "natural." As a consequence, several companies reverted to manufacturing with sucrose (table sugar) from products that had previously been made with HFCS. In 2010, the Corn Refiners Association applied to allow HFCS to be renamed "corn sugar," but that petition was rejected by the FDA in 2012.

In August 2016, in a move to please consumers with health concerns, McDonald's announced that it would be replacing all HFCS in their buns with sucrose (table sugar) and would remove preservatives and other artificial additives from its menu items. Marion Gross, senior vice president of McDonald's stated, "We know that they [consumers] don't feel good about high-fructose corn syrup so we're giving them what they're looking for instead." Over the early 21st century, other companies such as Yoplait, Gatorade, and Hershey's also phased out HFCS, replacing it with conventional sugar because consumers perceived sugar to be healthier. Companies such as PepsiCo and Heinz have also released products that use sugar in lieu of HFCS, although they still sell HFCS-sweetened products.

== History ==
Commercial production of HFCS began in 1964. In the late 1950s, scientists at Clinton Corn Processing Company of Clinton, Iowa, tried to turn glucose from corn starch into fructose, but the process they used was not scalable. In 1965–1970, Yoshiyuki Takasaki, at the Japanese National Institute of Advanced Industrial Science and Technology developed a heat-stable xylose isomerase enzyme from yeast. In 1967, the Clinton Corn Processing Company obtained an exclusive license to manufacture glucose isomerase derived from Streptomyces bacteria and began shipping an early version of HFCS in February 1967. In 1983, the FDA accepted HFCS as "generally recognized as safe," and that decision was reaffirmed in 1996.

Prior to the development of the worldwide sugar industry, dietary fructose was limited to only a few items. Milk, meats, and most vegetables, the staples of many early diets, have no fructose, and only 5–10% fructose by weight is found in fruits such as grapes, apples, and blueberries. Most traditional dried fruits, however, contain about 50% fructose. From 1970 to 2000, there was a 25% increase in "added sugars" in the U.S. When recognized as a cheaper, more versatile sweetener, HFCS replaced sucrose as the main sweetener of soft drinks in the United States.

Since 1789, the U.S. sugar industry has had trade protection in the form of tariffs on foreign-produced sugar, while subsidies to corn growers cheapen the primary ingredient in HFCS, corn. Accordingly, industrial users looking for cheaper sugar replacements rapidly adopted HFCS in the 1970s.

== See also ==
- High-maltose corn syrup
- Agave syrup, similar in fructose content
- Inverted sugar syrup, 1:1 fructose-to-glucose ratio from table sugar
- List of syrups
