= High-maltose corn syrup =

Food additive

High-maltose corn syrup (HMCS) is a food additive used as a sweetener and preservative. The majority of sugar is maltose. It is less sweet than high-fructose corn syrup and contains little to no fructose. It is sweet enough to be useful as a sweetener in commercial food production, however. To be given the label "high", the syrup must contain at least 50% maltose. Typically, it contains 40–50% maltose, though some have as high as 70%.

By using β-amylase or fungal α-amylase, glucose syrups containing over 50% maltose, or even over 70% maltose (extra-high-maltose syrup) can be produced.^{p. 465} This is possible because these enzymes remove two glucose units, that is, one maltose molecule at a time, from the end of the starch molecule.

== Uses ==
High-maltose corn syrup is used as a substitute for normal glucose syrup in the production of hard candy: at a given moisture level and temperature, a maltose solution has a lower viscosity than a glucose solution, but will still set to a hard product. Maltose is also less humectant than glucose, so candy produced with high-maltose syrup will not become sticky as easily as candy produced with standard glucose syrup.^{p. 81}

Since maltose syrups (like all sugar syrups) have a low freezing point, HMCS is useful in frozen desserts. It is also used in brewing because it has a balanced fermentability, can be added at high concentrations to the wort kettle, increasing throughput, and reduces haze caused by varying malt quality. Another of HMCS's uses is to preserve food. According to the Center for Science in the Public Interest, HMCS preserves food by inhibiting fermentation and bacterial growth.

== Health effects ==
In recent years, HMCS has seen an increase in use as a food additive due to the negative reputation of HFCS.

High-maltose syrups produced from corn are gluten-free, but certain syrups produced from wheat or barley may contain small amounts of gluten. It is unclear whether gluten occurring in wheat- or barley-based syrup can have significant effects in celiac disease.

== See also ==
- List of syrups
