= CMF design =

Aspects of color, materials, finish

Color, material, and finish (CMF) is an area of industrial design that focuses on the chromatic, tactile and decorative identity of products and environments.

== Characteristics ==
CMF design uses metadesign logic, the simultaneous planning of the identity of entire ranges of products for a given brand. This makes it possible, for example, to adopt a single color matrix, instead of using a series of separate and different color cards for each line of products, as previously done. A contribution to the development of this approach to design was the impetus provided by the proliferation in the 1980s of complete ranges of new systemic products.

Brand products are often thought up by different designers who through the use of ad-hoc CMF design manuals can work together to ensure a unique but coordinated identity for the products. This working process is advantageous in terms of the choice of color base for systemic products that are either of heterogeneous origin or are considered OEM products. The latter, even if characterized by different forms, can be connoted with the base colors or materials that are representative of the brand due to CMF design. Since CMF design manuals and the color matrix have a prescriptive role, the designers who create them are rarely involved in the applicative distribution of colors, materials or finishes of individual products.

== Bibliography ==
- Hope, Augustine (Fall 1983). "Herman Miller: Color Systems for Systems Furniture". American Fabrics and Fashions (129): 43–50.
- Marberry, Sarah O. (January 1985). "Compendium helps designers coordinate color program". Contract. p. 99.
- Thomas, Mitchell C. (1996). New Thinking In Design. Conversations on Theory and Practice. Van Nostrand Reinhold. pp. 60–71. ISBN 9780442017330.
