= Xylose isomerase =

Class of enzymes

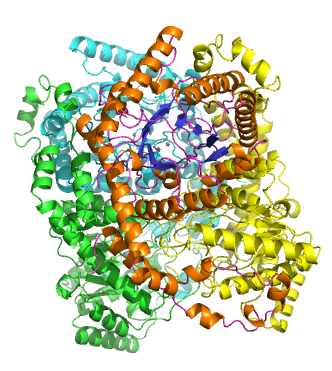
- d-Xylose isomerase tetramer from Streptomyces rubiginosus PDB 2glk. One monomer is coloured by secondary structure to highlight the TIM barrel architecture.

Identifiers
- EC no.: 5.3.1.5
- CAS no.: 9023-82-9

Databases
- BRENDA: enzyme data
- ExPASy: NiceZyme view
- KEGG: enzyme entry
- MetaCyc: metabolic pathway
- Rhea: reactions
- PDB structures: RCSB PDB PDBe PDBsum
- Gene Ontology: AmiGO / QuickGO
Search
- PMC: articles
- PubMed: articles
- NCBI: proteins

In enzymology, a xylose isomerase (EC 5.3.1.5) is an enzyme that catalyzes the interconversion of d-xylose and d-xylulose. This enzyme belongs to the family of isomerases, specifically those intramolecular oxidoreductases interconverting aldoses and ketoses. The isomerase has now been observed in nearly a hundred species of bacteria. Xylose-isomerases are also commonly called glucose isomerase or fructose isomerases due to their ability to interconvert glucose and fructose. The systematic name of this enzyme class is α-D-xylopyranose aldose-ketose-isomerase. Other names in common use include d-xylose isomerase, d-xylose ketoisomerase, and d-xylose ketol-isomerase.

== History ==
The activity of d-xylose isomerase was first observed by Mitsuhashi and Lampen in 1953 in the bacterium Lactobacillus pentosus. It has also been successfully produced in transformed E. coli. In 1957, the d-xylose isomerase activity on d-glucose conversion to d-fructose was noted by Kooi and Marshall. It is now known that isomerases have broad substrate specificity. Most pentoses and some hexoses are all substrates for d-xylose isomerase. Some examples include d-ribose, l-arabinose, l-rhamnose, and d-allose.

Conversion of glucose to fructose by xylose isomerase was first patented in the 1960s. However, the process was not industrially practical as the enzymes were in solution, and recycling the enzyme was problematic. An immobile xylose isomerase that was fixed on a solid surface was first developed in Japan by Takahashi. These developments were essential to the development of industrial fermentation processes used in manufacturing high-fructose corn syrup.

The tertiary structures of several microbial xylose isomerases were determined from the mid 1980s (Streptomyces olivochromogenes in 1988, Streptomyces violaceoniger in 1988, Streptomyces rubiginosus in 1984, Arthrobacter B3728 in 1986, Actinoplanes missouriensis in 1992, and Clostridium thermosulfurogenes in 1990).

== Function ==
This enzyme participates in pentose and glucuronate interconversions and fructose and mannose metabolism. The most bio-available sugars according to the International Society of Rare Sugars are: glucose, galactose, mannose, fructose, xylose, ribose, and l-arabinose. Twenty hexoses and nine pentoses, including xylulose, were considered to be "rare sugars". Hence, d-xylose isomerase is used to produce these rare sugars which have very important applications in biology despite their low abundance.

== Characterization ==
Xylose isomerase can be isolated from red Chinese rice wine, which contains the bacterium Lactobacillus xylosus. This bacterium was mistakenly classified as a L. plantarum, which normally grows on the sugar l-arabinose, and rarely grown on d-xylose. L. xylosus was recognized to be distinct for its ability to grow on d-xylose. Xylose isomerase in L. xylosus has a molecular weight of about 183000 daltons. Its optimum growth pH is about 7.5 for the L. lactis; however, strains such as the L. brevis xylose enzyme prefer a more alkaline environment. The L. lactis strain is stable over the pH range of 6.5 to 11.0, and the L. brevis enzyme, which is less tolerant of pH changes, show activity over the pH range of 5.7–7.0. Thermal tests were also done by Kei Y. and Noritaka T. and the xylose isomerase was found to be thermally stable to about 60 degrees Celsius

== Active site and mechanism ==
Xylose isomerase has a structure that is based on eight alpha/beta barrels that create an active site holding two divalent magnesium ions. Xylose isomerase enzymes exhibit a TIM barrel fold with the active site in the centre of the barrel and a tetrameric quaternary structure. PDB structures are available in the links in the infobox to the right. The protein is a tetramer where paired barrels are nearly coaxial, which form two cavities in which the divalent metals are both bound to one of the two cavities. The metals are in an octahedral geometry. Metal site 1 binds the substrate tightly, while metal site 2 binds the substrate loosely. Both share an acid residue, Glutamic acid 216 of the enzyme, that bridges the two cations. Two basic amino acids surround the negatively charged ligands to neutralize them. The second cavity faces the metal cavity and both cavities share the same access route. The second cavity is hydrophobic, and has a histidine residue activated by an aspartate residue that is hydrogen bonded to it. This histidine residue is important in the isomerization of glucose.

In the isomerization of glucose, Histidine 53 is used to catalyze the proton transfer of O1 to O5; the diagram for the ring opening mechanism is shown below. The first metal, mentioned earlier, coordinates to O3 and O4, and is used to dock the substrate.

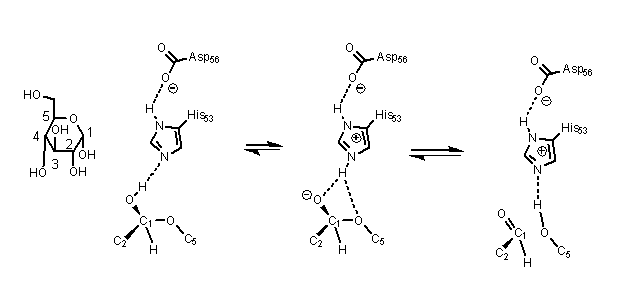
ring opening mechanism of glucose

In the isomerization of xylose, crystal data shows that xylose binds to the enzyme as an open chain. Metal 1 binds to O2 and O4, and once bound, metal 2 binds to O1 and O2 in the transition state. These interactions along with a lysine residue help catalyze the hydride shift necessary for isomerization. The transition state consists of a high energy carbonium ion that is stabilized through all the metal interactions with the sugar substrate.

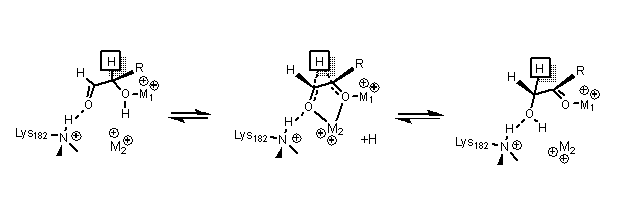
mechanism of xylose isomerization

== Application in industry ==
The most widely used application of this enzyme is in the conversion of glucose to fructose to produce high fructose corn syrup (HFCS). There are three general steps in producing HFCS from starch:

- enzymatic degradation of the starch using α-amylase. Also known as liquification.
- further degradation using glucoamylase and a debranching enzyme.
- Production of fructose by xylose isomerase

The process is carried out in bioreactors at 60–65 °C. Many enzyme become denatured at these temperatures, and one focus of research has been engineering more thermostable versions of xylose isomerase and the other enzymes in the process. The enzymes are generally immobilized to increase throughput, and finding better ways to do this has been another research focus.

Xylose isomerase is one of the enzymes used by bacteria in nature in order to utilize hemicellulose as an energy source, and another focus of industrial and academic research has been developing versions of xylose isomerase that could be useful in the production of biofuel.

== As a dietary supplement ==
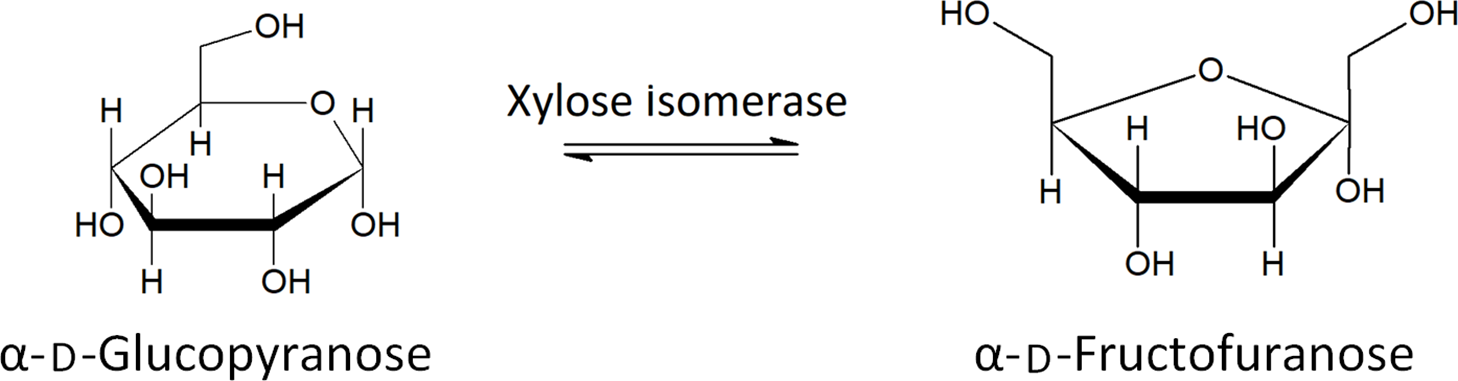
The conversion of glucose to fructose by xylose isomerase. Image taken from doi:10.1017/S0007114521001215 under the conditions of CC BY 4.0 license; authors: Miles Benardout, Adam Le Gresley, Amr ElShaer and Stephen P. Wren.

The ability of xylose isomerase to convert between glucose and fructose has led to its proposal as a treatment for fructose malabsorption. This enzyme is used in industrial settings and has been shown to produce no allergic response in humans.

Products containing xylose isomerase are sold as over-the-counter (OTC) dietary supplements to combat fructose malabsorption, under brand names including Fructaid, Fructease, Fructase, Fructose Digest and Fructosin. Apart from general concerns over the effectiveness of OTC-enzymes, there is currently very limited research available on Xylose-Isomerase as a dietary supplement, with the sole scientific study indicating a positive effect on malabsorption-related nausea and abdominal pain, but none on bloating. This decrease in breath hydrogen excretion demonstrated in this study is a potential sign that fructose was absorbed much better. However, the results of this study was not confirmed by other studies, and this study did not assess the long-term health effects and did not try to determine which patients are best suited to treatment with xylose isomerase, if at all.
