= Sugar marketing =

Marketing of sugar

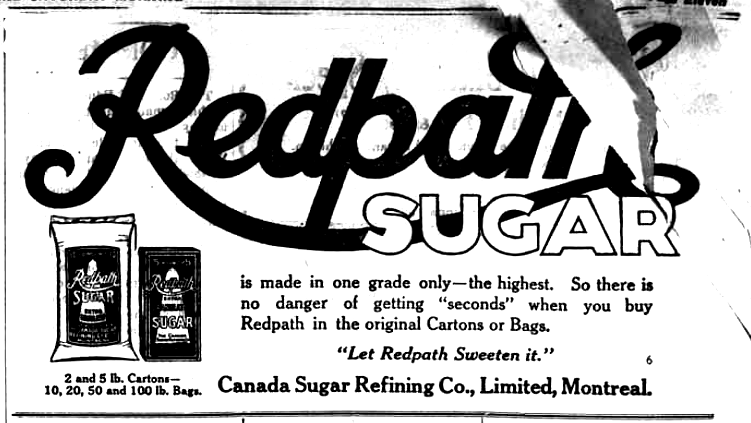
A Redpath Sugar advertisement

Sugar is heavily marketed both by sugar producers and the producers of sugary drinks and foods. Apart from direct marketing methods such as messaging on packaging, television ads, advergames, and product placement in setting like blogs, industry has worked to steer coverage of sugar-related health information in popular media, including news media and social media.

Sugar refiners and manufacturers of sugary foods and drinks have also sought to influence medical research and public health recommendations. The results of research on the health effects of sugary food and drink differ significantly, depending on whether the researcher has financial ties to the food and drink industry. The authors of a 2016 review of funding bias concluded that "This industry seems to be manipulating contemporary scientific processes to create controversy and advance their business interests at the expense of the public's health".

== History ==
In the early 1950s, sugar was marketed as a healthy substance that would help curb hunger and provide an energy boost. More recent methods are necessarily less direct. Methods of marketing sugary products include:

- marketing high-sugar versions of established low-sugar brands as flavour variations
- using words associated with health, such as "healthy", "natural", "naturally sweetened" and "lightly sweetened"
- using associations with fruit to imply healthiness
- shill advertising, through front groups and individuals with no obvious connection to the sugar industry, including people presenting themselves as independent scientists
- targeting women, who make many food purchasing decisions
- targeting children; below age seven, they have difficulty recognizing persuasive intent, and below the age of twelve, they are more easily distracted from it than adults. Almost a quarter of food industry advertising money is spent on advertising to children.
- positioning sugary drinks and foods as a freedom-of-choice issue rather than a public health one

=== Influence on health information and guidelines ===
Sugar refiners and manufacturers of sugary foods and drinks have sought to influence medical research and public health recommendations, with substantial spending documented from the 1960s to 2016. The results of research on the health effects of sugary food and drink differ significantly, depending on whether the researcher has financial ties to the food and drink industry. The authors of a 2016 review of funding bias concluded that "This industry seems to be manipulating contemporary scientific processes to create controversy and advance their business interests at the expense of the public's health". A 2013 review concluded that "unhealthy commodity industries should have no role in the formation of national or international NCD [non-communicable disease] policy".

There have been similar efforts to steer coverage of sugar-related health information in popular media, including news media and social media.

The Sugar Research Foundation, a trade association for the sugar industry, conceived, funded, and participated in an influential 1967 medical review. It was called "SRF Funds Project 226", and published as "Dietary Fats, Carbohydrates and Atherosclerotic Vascular Disease". While this took place in 1965–1967, it was documented in a 2016 JAMA Internal Medicine publication which reviewed industry documents. Among the researchers who put their names to the 1967 review, David Mark Hegsted went on to write national nutrition guidelines, and Fredrick J. Stare was head of Harvard University's nutrition department. Rules surrounding conflicts of interest in academic publishing were laxer then, helping the payment to go undeclared. Taking into account "other recent analyses of sugar industry documents", the 2016 review concludes that such actions were part of a wider industry-sponsored research program in the 1960s and 1970s. It also concludes that "Policymaking committees should consider giving less weight to food industry–funded studies".

Immediately afterwards, the same Sugar Research Foundation funded a study comparing sugar-fed and starch-fed rats. "SRF Funds Project 259: Dietary Carbohydrate and Blood Lipids in Germ-Free Rats" was funded from 1967 until 1971, when, after reporting preliminary results to the funders, it did not have its funding renewed. The research was never published.

The U.S. National Institute of Dental Research's 1971 National Caries Program was lobbied by the sugar industry, which substantially influenced the types of research the caries program called for. Research on food cariogenicity that could have harmed the sugar industry was omitted from funding priorities. The NIDR's public health task force on caries and an industry task force on caries had almost exactly the same members. The NIDR copied 78% of the industry groups' report into their own, with portions being copied verbatim.

After the WHO recommended cutting sugar consumption to less than 10% of daily energy intake in 1990, the International Life Sciences Institute gained accreditation as a research organization the WHO and FAO. The institute was founded by parties including Coca-Cola, PepsiCo and General Foods. Phillip James, head of the International Obesity Taskforce, considered that this accreditation increased industry influence over world health guidelines.

The development of official European dietary guidelines was influenced by European sugar industry groups, who in 2000 threatened to block the report if a recommendation to limit sugar consumption to less than 10% of daily energy intake were not removed. The medical experts felt forced change the recommendation, to one that sugar should not be eaten more than four times a day.

Industry groups also criticized the evidence behind the World Health Organization 2003 recommended limit on free sugar consumption (again, to less than 10% of daily energy intake). The US sugar industry additionally lobbied the US Congress to cut funding to the WHO.

When the WHO updated the recommendations, a decade later in 2013, it commissioned two reviews, and found support for both the earlier recommendation and a new, stricter one, half as high as the old limit. This also met with industry opposition. The WHO began requiring anyone submitting formal comments on the proposal to fill out a conflict-of-interest form.

In 2011, the competing Corn Refiners Association (which makes sugar syrups (Note: Note: corn syrups are common in the US, as government market intervention makes them cheaper than granulated sugar; outside the US, it is uncommon.)) and the Sugar Association became involved in a lawsuit against one another, which continued as of 2015. In the course of this lawsuit, numerous internal documents were made public. These revealed funding of over $10 million to James Rippe for health research and media outreach, and a combined $4 million to Citizens for Health and Center for Consumer Freedom, which publicly opposed one another's views on the healthiness of the rival products without acknowledging their funding (such shilling is legal in the US following the Citizens United ruling).

In 2015, it was reported that Coca-Cola had paid millions to promote controversial health messages related to sweet drinks, ranging from academic research to social media posts, since 2008. The money went to researchers, dietitians, health experts, research organizations, and professional associations, among others.

Following this media attention, Coca-Cola released information on almost $120 million U.S. dollars given out to medical, health and community organizations between 2010 and 2015. These include $29 million for academic research; the largest donation was $7.5 million to Louisiana State University's Pennington Biomedical Research Center. Coca-Cola has now announced that it will "pull back" (reporter's phrasing) from funding health experts and obesity research, in order to improve its transparency.

== Labeling ==
Sugar is added to ingredients lists under dozens of different names, which, where ingredients lists are in order from largest to smallest quantity, can let sugars appear spuriously lower on the ingredients list.

=== 2016 US nutritional labeling changes ===
In 2016, the FDA enacted new requirements for US nutrition labels, which include calorie count in larger type and a separate line for added sugars. By July 2018 most manufacturers will need to use the new label.

The new FDA requirements were initially proposed in 2014, they met with strong opposition from sugar and sugary food producers. Industry claimed the new rule lacked any scientific justification. Many specific companies also wrote letters requesting certain products to be exempt from the rule. The head of Ocean Spray Cranberries wrote a letter to the FDA explaining that cranberries without sugar are "unpalatable" and claimed that they needed to be an exception to the bill. The American Beverage Association wanted the measurement on the back of their labels to be in grams instead of teaspoons, saying that teaspoon measurements would carry a negative connotation that misrepresents the factual nature of nutritional information.

The changes had bipartisan support; George W. Bush supported the FDA in its request for the legislation, and, after it was enacted under Barack Obama, said that the government had "got this right".

== Campaigns to lower sugar consumption ==
A community campaign in Howard County, Maryland, used the media to influence the attitudes and behaviors about the relationship between sugary drinks and obesity. The "Howard County Unsweetened" campaign used social media, television ads, in-person marketing, and community organizations to encourage people to drink less sugary drinks, and promoted water as a substitute. This campaign was modeled after a study done in Portland, Oregon that found community based interventions were successful in influencing consumers likelihood of purchasing sugary drinks in supermarkets. Researchers associated sugary drinks with obesity, heart disease, and diabetes to influence the attitudes of the consumers and the purchasing behaviors of consumers.

=== Sugar taxes ===
Sugar taxes have been used to reduce the consumption of sugary drinks, often in combination with public information campaigns.

A 2010 study of a sugar taxes in the US found that they decreased consumption of taxed drinks, but increased the consumption of untaxed high-calorie drinks, removing the benefit.

In Mexico, sugary drink consumption dropped after a public health campaign including a sugar tax came in in 2014, and dropped further a year later. A 2015 tax in Berkeley, California, had a similar effect, although overall grocery spending did not decline. In 2016, the far larger city of Philadelphia brought in a sugar tax to fund children's programs.

In Chile, a law implemented in 2016, was the first national regulation to jointly mandate front-of-package warning labels, restrict child-directed marketing, and ban sales in schools of all foods and beverages containing added sugars, sodium, or saturated fats that exceed set nutrient or calorie thresholds. A study later confirmed that purchases of high-in beverages significantly declined following implementation of Chile's Law of Food Labeling and Advertising; these reductions were larger than those observed from single, standalone policies, including sugar-sweetened-beverage taxes previously implemented in Latin America.

== See also ==
- Ancel Keys
- Sugar § Health effects
- Sugar industry
