= Obstetric transition =

In reproductive health, obstetric transition is a concept around the secular trend of countries gradually shifting from a pattern of high maternal mortality to low maternal mortality, from direct obstetric causes of maternal mortality to indirect causes, aging of maternal population, and moving from the natural history of pregnancy and childbirth to institutionalization of maternity care, medicalization and over medicalization. This concept was originally proposed in the Latin American Association of Reproductive Health Researchers (ALIRH, 2013) in analogy of the epidemiological, demographic and nutritional transitions.

== Overview ==
In the last two decades, the world has seen a substantial reduction of maternal mortality.(1) Considering that maternal mortality is vastly determined by social, societal and contextual factors, this reduction is important not only because of the number of lives that have been spared in this period (an estimated 2,000,000 between 1990 and 2010), but because it denotes that the world is making progress towards development and gender equality.(1,2) However, this progress is still insufficient, unequal and slow: recent estimates suggest that 287,000 women died of causes related to pregnancy and childbirth in 2010. Maternal mortality remains a global tragedy, but the observed progress inspires the international community to believe and strive for the elimination of maternal mortality in the decades to come.(3)

The vast majority of maternal deaths is avoidable and takes place in developing countries. In developed countries, the maternal mortality ratio can be as low as 10 maternal deaths per 100,000 live births while among the least developed countries it can be as a high as 1,000 maternal deaths or more per 100,000 live births.(4) This disparity is also observed within countries and when the population is disaggregated in quintiles of income or education.(5-7) Thus, countries, regions within countries and different population groups within country experience a specific momentum in a dynamic process of reduction of maternal mortality, which may benefit from specific approaches.

In 1929, Thompson described the phenomenon of demographic transition characterized by a gradual shift from a pattern of high mortality and high fertility to a pattern of low mortality and low fertility.(8) Omram (1971) described the epidemiologic transition, with a shift from a pattern of high prevalence of communicable diseases to a pattern of high prevalence of non-communicable diseases.(9) Finally, Poppkin (1993) proposed the nutritional transition model, which helps to understand the transformations in human diets and the global epidemic of obesity.(10) These transitions and other socioeconomic and cultural changes (e.g. globalization, urbanization) led us to develop the concept of “obstetric transition” (11).

== Concept ==
As a result of the Millennium Development Goals Project, improved data related to maternal mortality and severe maternal morbidity became available for the period between 1990 and 2010. Altogether, these data reflect a secular trend where countries are gradually shifting from a pattern of high maternal mortality to low maternal mortality, from direct obstetric causes of maternal mortality to indirect causes, moving from the natural history of pregnancy and childbirth to institutionalization of maternity care, medicalization and over medicalization, and aging of maternal population. This is the “obstetric transition” phenomenon, which has implications for the strategies aimed at reducing maternal mortality.

Figure 1 presents trends of maternal mortality by world region for the period 1990 to 2010 derived from recent estimates (2). Considering that countries and world regions are transitioning in the same pathway towards elimination of maternal deaths, five stages can be devised. Countries are experiencing this transition at different paces, and have started this process in different moments of their history (e.g. most developed countries started their transitions more than a century ago, while some developing countries have started their transition much more recently).

== Classification ==
In the Stage I (MMR> 1,000 / 100,000) most women are experiencing a situation close to the natural history of pregnancy and childbirth, with very little being done – if anything at all – to reduce the risk of maternal mortality at the population level. Considering 2010 data, Chad and Somalia are countries that could illustrate this stage. Hopefully, as time passes (and progress occurs), no country will remain in this stage. Stage I is characterized by very high maternal mortality, high fertility and the predominance of direct causes of maternal deaths together with a substantial proportion of deaths attributable to communicable diseases such as malaria.

In the Stage II (MMR: 999 – 300) mortality and fertility remain very high, with a similar pattern of causes as compared to the Stage I. However, a greater proportion of women in the population are being able to somewhat detach from the natural history of pregnancy and childbirth. Several countries in the Sub-Saharan Africa could illustrate the Stage II. For Stages I and II, the main issue is access to care. In general, these are countries with a substantial lack of basic infrastructure (such as roads, transportation, health facilities), very low education levels (particularly female literacy), weak health systems, severe shortages of skilled birth attendants and low capacity to deliver essential life-saving interventions. In this context, poor quality of care functions as deterrent for generating demand for health services. In countries in these stages, focus should be directed to creating the basic infra-structure and implement maternal-mortality primary prevention measures (e.g. family planning, iron supplementation, insecticide treated nets, intersectorial measures to remove barriers to access the health system). As the minimal infra-structure is created, health services should strive to deliver quality care in order to become a sensible alternative to pregnant women (demand generation). (21)

In the obstetric transition, the tipping point occurs in the Stage III. In this stage the mortality is still high (MMR 299 – 100 maternal deaths / 100,000 live births), the fertility is variable and direct causes of mortality still predominates. This is a complex stage because access remain an issue for a great deal of the population, but as a large proportion of pregnant women are indeed reaching health facilities, quality of care becomes a major determinant of health outcomes. Not only primary prevention is important, but also secondary and tertiary prevention are critical for improving maternal health outcomes in this stage. In other words, quality of care, with skilled birth attendance and appropriate management of complications and disabilities, is essential to reduce maternal mortality. India, Guatemala and South Africa are countries that could illustrate this stage.

In the Stage IV (MMR <50 maternal deaths / 100,000 live births), the maternal mortality is moderate or low, there is low fertility and the indirect causes of maternal mortality, particularly the non-communicable diseases, acquire greater importance. In order to further advance the reduction of maternal mortality, the main issue becomes quality of care and elimination of delays within health systems. Another aspect that emerges in this stage is the growing role of over medicalization as a threat to quality and improved health outcomes. Various Asian countries and most Latin American countries have joined developed countries in this stage.

In the Stage V, all avoidable maternal deaths are indeed avoided. The maternal mortality rate is very low, the fertility is low or very low, and the non-communicable diseases are the main causes of maternal mortality. As this is an aspirational, largely theoretical stage at the moment, the maternal mortality levels remain uncertain, but could be lower than 5 maternal deaths per 100,000 live births. The main issue in this stage would be the sustainability of excellence in quality of care.

It is worth noting that the main purpose of this framework is to illustrate different phases of a dynamic process and offer a rationale for different focus and solutions for reducing mortality according to the stage in the obstetric transition. The ranges of maternal mortality ratio uses to define the proposed stages of obstetric transition are frequently in country stratification, (2, 16) but the boundaries between these stages are somewhat imprecise and one stage tends to fade into another. Progression is not always linear and, largely due to equity issues, different stages often co-exist in the same country.

== See also ==
- Demographic transition
- Epidemiological transition
- Maternal mortality
- Maternal near miss
- Nutritional transition
- Perinatal mortality
