= Public perception of high-fructose corn syrup =

Overview of public relations campaigns

Critics and competitors of high-fructose corn syrup (HFCS), notably the sugar industry, have for many years used various public relations campaigns to claim the sweetener causes certain health conditions, despite the lack of scientific evidence that HFCS differs nutritionally from sugar. The HFCS industry has tried to respond to these campaigns with their own efforts.

== Labeling as "natural" ==
In May 2006, the Center for Science in the Public Interest (CSPI) threatened to file a lawsuit against Cadbury Schweppes for labeling 7 Up as "All Natural" or "100% Natural", despite the presence of high-fructose corn syrup. The U.S. Food and Drug Administration (FDA) has no general definition of "natural"; however, FDA regulations define "natural flavoring" to include products of vegetables. Current FDA policy is that it does not object to labeling HFCS as "natural". The CSPI also state that HFCS is not a "natural" ingredient due to the high level of processing and the use of at least one genetically modified (GMO) enzyme required to produce it. On January 12, 2007, Cadbury Schweppes agreed to stop calling 7 Up "all natural". They now label it "100% Natural Flavors".

== HFCS advertisements ==
In September 2008, the Corn Refiners Association launched a series of United States television advertisements that stated that HFCS "is made from corn", "is natural" (changed from previously stated "doesn't have artificial ingredients"), "has the same calories as sugar or honey", "is nutritionally the same as sugar", and "is fine in moderation", in the ambition of keeping consumers from avoiding HFCS products. The ads feature actors portraying roles in upbeat domestic situations with sugary foods, with one actor disparaging a food's HFCS content but being unable to explain why, and another actor questioning the comments with these claims. Finally, the ads each make reference to the Corn Refiners Association website.

2010 Corn Refiners Association ads feature parents walking through a corn field, talking about children's nutrition concerns and being confused by recent HFCS information. So they consulted "medical and nutrition experts" and discovered that "Whether it's corn sugar or cane sugar, your body can't tell the difference."

Michael Jacobson, executive director of the Center for Science in the Public Interest, called the advertisements "deceptive", stating: "High-fructose corn syrup starts out as cornstarch, which is chemically or enzymatically degraded to glucose and some short polymers of glucose. Another enzyme is then used to convert varying fractions of glucose into fructose...High-fructose corn syrup just doesn't exist in nature." However, Jacobson also stated that: "The special harmfulness of high-fructose corn syrup has become one of those urban myths that sounds right, but is basically wrong. Nutritionally, high-fructose corn syrup and sucrose may be identical."

Since HFCS is present in a "staggering" amount of food in the US, and in most foods marketed to children, there are doubts as to whether it can be consumed in moderation:

...unless you're making a concerted effort to avoid it, it's pretty difficult to consume high-fructose corn syrup in moderation

— Time magazine

== Moves back to sugar ==
A March 21, 2009 The New York Times article said that some food companies and restaurants were using sugar in their product as a selling point in order to attract customers who prefer not to consume high-fructose corn syrup. As one example, the article cited Jason's Deli, a chain of delis with 200 restaurants in 27 states. The chain had replaced high-fructose corn syrup with sugar in everything except a few soft drinks. Daniel Helfman, a spokesman for the deli chain, was quoted as saying, "Part of this is a huge rebellion against HFCS... but part of it is taste."

In the late 2000s, PepsiCo put forth a "throwback" version of Mountain Dew and Pepsi-Cola, designed to taste the same as these drinks did in the 1960s and 1970s. One aspect of the formulation is that sugar is used instead of HFCS. PepsiCo stated that HFCS and sugar are "essentially the same" and that the only reason HFCS was eschewed was in order to accurately reflect the taste of the past. Dr Pepper also released a "heritage" version of Dr Pepper Soda in 2009 that was made to the original formula and used beet sugar instead of HFCS. Since its establishment in 1891, the Dr Pepper bottling plant in Dublin, TX has continued to use the original formula sweetened with Imperial Cane Sugar (see Dublin Dr Pepper). In addition, the Coca-Cola bottling plant in the Lehigh Valley, Pennsylvania, and most Coca-Cola bottling plants in Europe also uses sucrose. Sucrose-based Mexican imports of Coca-Cola and other soft drinks are getting increasing penetration into US markets.

In May 2010, Hunt's removed high-fructose corn syrup from its ketchup due to buyer preference as a result of health concerns, but has since put High Fructose Corn Syrup back in their ketchup. Heinz now offers a ketchup made with sugar instead of HFCS called "Simply Heinz."

Popular campaigns by nutritional experts and assumption by a rapidly increasing faction of the consuming public in the United States that high-fructose corn syrup has harmful health effects unique to it continues to result in increasing reformulation of popular processed foods and reduced sales of HFCS by 9% in 2009 as compared with 2007. Known health risks include weight gain/obesity, type-2 diabetes, elevated LDL ("bad") cholesterol levels, long-term liver damage and mercury exposure.

Ivan Royster of South Carolina, now residing in Raleigh, North Carolina began a Facebook page which has grown to over 190,000 fans, lobbying for the ban of HFCS in the U.S. An article recently published by Organic Connections magazine covered Ivan's protest and the Corn Refiners Association's counter to his efforts. The article includes links to Ivan's Facebook page and a study on HFCS.

== Proposed name change to corn sugar ==
On September 14, 2010, the Corn Refiners Association applied for permission to use the name "corn sugar" in place of "high-fructose corn syrup" on food labels for products sold in the United States. According to a press release, "Consumers need to know what is in their foods and where their foods come from and we want to be clear with them," said CRA president Audrae Erickson. "The term 'corn sugar' succinctly and accurately describes what this natural ingredient is and where it comes from – corn." The association, however, did not provide clarification as to a change in what the FDA already considers corn sugar, i.e., dextrose or any of the other corn-derived sugars such as corn syrup and maltodextrin.

Time stated that the CRA's decision to change the name of HFCS was because HFCS had such a bad reputation. In response to the proposed name change, The New York Times ran an article asking nutrition experts what they would suggest as appropriate names for HFCS. Three of the five experts recommended alternate names, including Michael Pollan who suggested "enzymatically altered corn glucose". Dr. Andrew Weil recommended not changing from HFCS, calling the term corn sugar "too vague" and the CRA's attempt to change HFCS's name "Orwellian". However Dr. Barry Popkin felt that "corn sugar" was an appropriate term.

On May 31, 2012, the Food and Drug Administration ultimately rejected the petition. In its decision, the FDA defined sugar as a "solid, dried and crystallized food" while syrup was "an aqueous solution or liquid food". In addition, the term "corn sugar" had already been approved as another name for dextrose, which has been commonly used as a food ingredient since the 1970s. Among the public health concerns cited were those individuals with hereditary fructose intolerance or fructose malabsorption, who have been advised to avoid ingredients that contain fructose. While individuals with fructose allergies have associated "corn sugar" (dextrose) to be an acceptable ingredient to their health when "high-fructose corn syrup" is not, changing the name of HFCS to "corn sugar" could put these individuals at risk.

== See also ==
- Citizens for Health
- High-fructose corn syrup and health
- That Sugar Film
