= Funding bias =

Tendency of a scientific study to support the interests of its funder

Funding bias, also known as sponsorship bias, funding outcome bias, funding publication bias, and funding effect, is a tendency of a scientific study to support the interests of the study's financial sponsor. This phenomenon is recognized sufficiently that researchers undertake studies to examine bias in past published studies. Funding bias has been associated, in particular, with research into chemical toxicity, tobacco, and pharmaceutical drugs. It is an instance of experimenter's bias.

== Causes ==
=== Human nature ===
The psychology text Influence: Science and Practice describes the act of reciprocity as a trait in which a person feels obliged to return favors. This trait is embodied in all human cultures. Human nature may influence even the most ethical researchers to be affected by their sponsors, although they may genuinely deny it.

=== Misconduct ===
Scientific malpractice involving shoddy research or data manipulation does occur in rare instances. Often, however, the quality of manufacturers' studies are at least as good as studies that were not funded by a special interest. Therefore, bias usually occurs for other reasons, such as hiding scientific malpractice under the guise of due diligence.

=== Predetermined conclusion ===
Research results can be selected or discarded to support a predetermined conclusion. The tobacco industry, for example, would publish their own internal research that invariably found minimal adverse health effects of passive smoking.

A company that hires researchers to perform a study may require the researchers to sign a nondisclosure agreement before they are funded, by which researchers waive their right to release any results independently and release them only to the sponsor. The sponsor may fund several studies at the same time, suppressing results found contrary to their business interests while publicizing the results that support their interests. Indeed, a review of pharmaceutical studies revealed that research funded by drug companies was less likely to be published, but the drug-company-funded research that was published was more likely to report outcomes favorable to the sponsor.

A double-blind study with only objective measures is less likely to be biased to support a given conclusion. However, the researchers or the sponsors still have opportunities to skew the results by discarding or ignoring undesirable data, qualitatively characterizing the results, and ultimately deciding whether to publish at all. Also, not all studies are possible to conduct double-blind.

=== Publication bias ===
Scientist researcher Anders Sandberg writes that funding bias may be a form of publication bias. Because it is easier to publish positive results than inconclusive or no results, positive results may be correlated with being positive for the sponsor.

Outcome reporting bias is related to publication bias and selection bias, in which multiple outcomes are measured but only the significant outcomes are reported, while insignificant or unfavorable outcomes are ignored.

=== Selection of subjects or comparators ===
Selection bias may result in a non-representative population of test subjects in spite of best efforts to obtain a representative sample. Even a double-blind study may be subject to biased selection of dependent variables, population (via inclusion and exclusion criteria), sample size, statistical methods, or inappropriate comparators, any of which can bias the outcome of a study to favor a particular conclusion.

== Examples ==
- A 1996 study on the effects of nicotine on cognitive performance revealed that findings of nicotine or smoking improving performance were more likely to be published by scientists who acknowledged tobacco industry support.
- A 1998 study found that review articles were 90 times more likely to conclude that passive smoking is not harmful when funded by the tobacco industry.
- A 2003 study of published research on antidepressants found that studies sponsored by manufacturers of selective serotonin reuptake inhibitors (SSRI) and newer antidepressants tended to favor their products over alternatives when compared to non-industry-funded studies. Also, modelling studies funded by industry were more favorable to industry than studies funded by non-industry sponsors. In general, studies funded by drug companies are four times more likely to favor the drug under trial than studies funded by other sponsors.
- A 2006 review of experimental studies examining the health effects of cell phone use found that studies funded exclusively by industry were least likely to report a statistically significant result.
- The US Food and Drug Administration (FDA) determined in 2008 that the bisphenol A (BPA) in plastic containers is safe when leached into food, citing chemical industry studies. Independent research studies reached different conclusions, with over 90 percent of them finding health effects from low doses of BPA.
- Two opposing commercial sponsors can be at odds with the published findings of research they sponsor. A 2008 Duke University study on rats, funded by the Sugar Association, found adverse effects of consuming the artificial sweetener Splenda. The manufacturer, Johnson & Johnson subsidiary McNeil Nutritionals LLC, responded by sponsoring its own team of experts to refute the study.
- In 2016, an analysis of studies exploring health effects of sugary soda consumption published between 2001 and 2016 found a 100% probability that a study was funded by sugar-sweetened beverage companies if it found no link between sugar-sweetened beverage consumption and poorer metabolic health. Only 2.9% of studies that found sugary beverages linked to higher rates of diabetes and obesity were underwritten by the sugar-sweetened beverage industry (see also sugar marketing). The authors concluded "This industry seems to be manipulating contemporary scientific processes to create controversy and advance their business interests at the expense of the public's health.”
- A 2017 Cochrane review analysis of outcomes of studies pertaining to drugs and medical devices revealed that manufacturing company sponsorship "leads to more favorable results and conclusions than sponsorship by other sources."

== See also ==
- Advocacy group
- Conflict of interest
- Conflicts of interest in academic publishing
- Metascience
- Regulatory capture
