= Sugar industry in the United States =

The sugar industry in the United States produces sugarcane and sugar beets, operates sugar refineries, and produces and markets refined sugars, sugar-sweetened goods, and other products. The United States is among the world's largest sugar producers. Unlike most other sugar producing countries, the United States has both large and well-developed sugarcane and sugar beet industries. Refined sugarcane, processed sugar beet, and high-fructose corn syrup are all commonly used in the U.S. as added sugars to sweeten food and beverages.

Historically, sugar production was important in the growth of slavery in Louisiana and in the U.S. annexation of Hawaii.

The Sugar Association is the trade association for the sugar industry in the United States. Sugar marketing in the U.S. is supported by sugar producers and the producers of sweetened food and beverages.

== History ==
Caribbean sugarcane already accounted for a large part of New York City trade by the 1720s.

=== Louisiana ===
Sugarcane was first planted in New Orleans in 1751 by French Jesuit priests. After Étienne de Boré introduced sugar refining to Louisiana in 1795, sugarcane production in Louisiana expanded dramatically; practically all Louisiana sugar was grown on plantations using slave labor. By the 1840s, Louisiana produced between 25% and 50% of sugar consumed in the US but it was far from the World's biggest producer, which was Cuba.

In the first half of the 19th century, the output of the Louisiana sugar industry increased substantially. The American Civil War paralyzed the sugarcane industry in Louisiana, causing a decline in output from 177,000 tons in 1855 to 5,000 tons in 1865. By 1875, the output had risen to 60,000 tons.

=== Georgia ===
Sugar cane plants were being grown in Georgia prior to 1760. Cultivation declined over the period 1820 to 1835 when the value of other crops, such as cotton and rice, increased.

=== Florida ===
Sugar cane was grown in Florida, but cultivation declined over the period 1820 to 1835 when the value of other crops, such as cotton and rice, increased.

== Sugar production ==
Between the mid-2000s and 2019, sugarcane accounted for between 40 and 45 percent of the total sugar produced domestically and sugar beet for between 55 and 60 percent of production. U.S. sugar production expanded from an early-1980s average of 6.0 million short tons, raw value (STRV) to an average 8.4 million STRV between 2005/06 and 2019.

=== Sugarcane ===
Sugarcane production by state (thousands of short tons)
State	2016/17	2019/20
Florida	16,120	17,011
Louisiana	11,520	14,629
Texas	1,395	1,251
Source: United States Department of Agriculture

In the 2020s, sugarcane is grown commercially in Florida, Louisiana, and Texas.

Florida's sugarcane production expanded significantly since the United States ceased importing sugar from Cuba in 1960. Florida is the largest cane-producing region in the United States. Most of the sugarcane is produced in organic soils along the southern and southeastern shore of Lake Okeechobee in Southern Florida, where the growing season is long and winters are generally warm.

In Louisiana, the northernmost cane-growing state, sugarcane production has been largely confined to the Mississippi River Delta, where soils are fertile and the climate is warm. However, the sugar industry in Louisiana has expanded northward and westward into nontraditional sugarcane growing areas. Most of the expansion in sugarcane acreage has occurred when returns for competing crops, such as rice and soybeans, have decreased. Louisiana production has also expanded because of the adoption of high-yielding sugarcane varieties, along with investments in new harvesting combines.

Texas sugarcane was produced in the Lower Rio Grande Valley in the southern tip of the state. The area has a subtropical climate with long, hot summers and short, mild winters. Hurricane and drought had significantly reduced production in some years. Production of sugarcane in Texas resumed with the 1973 crop after years of inactivity. The overall area harvested in the 1980s changed little and averaged around 35,000 acres. Sugarcane production averaged about 100,000 tons per year for the same period, but varied from year to year because of changes in yields. Fiscal year 2001 saw a 50-percent expansion in sugarcane acreage from the previous year. Area harvested has averaged about 39,000 acres since FY 2010, and sugar produced averaged 138,500 short tons raw value.

However, as of April 23, 2024, the last sugarcane mill in Texas, the Rio Grande Valley Sugar Growers, Inc, in Santa Rosa, closed its doors after 51 years in operations due to water scarcity in the region.

==== Hawaii ====
Historically, Hawaii's sugarcane production was spread among the islands of Hawaii, Kauai, Maui, and Oahu. Sugar production in Hawaii ended when the final sugar mill on Maui closed in 2016.

=== Sugar beet ===
Sugar beet production by state (thousands of short tons)
State	2016/17	2019/20	% of total
Minnesota	12,510	11,578	33%
North Dakota	6,252	6,124	18%
Idaho	7,038	6,789	20%
Michigan	4,589	4,336	12%
Nebraska	1,411	1,365	4%
Montana	1,586	1,390	4%
California	1,137	1,043	3%
Wyoming	951	894	3%
Colorado	927	767	2%
Washington	91	93	0.3%
U.S. total	36,920	34,751	99.3%
Source: United States Department of Agriculture

Sugar beets are the other leading raw material for manufactured sugar in the United States. This is a sturdy crop grown in a wide variety of temperate climatic conditions and planted annually. Sugar beets can be stored for a short while after harvest, but must be processed before sucrose deterioration occurs. A recent development has been the introduction of genetically modified seed varieties. In the 2009/10 crop year, genetically modified varieties accounted for about 95 percent of planted area, up from about 60 percent in 2008/09.

Sugar beets are grown in five regions encompassing eleven states and tend to be grown in rotation with other crops. Two of the regions are east of the Mississippi River, while the three other areas are in the Great Plains and Far West. The western regions represent dryland farming that depends on irrigation as a primary water source. The eastern regions depend on rainfall. Historically, sugar beet yields in the western areas have tended to be higher than in the east. However, with the adoption of new disease-resistant and genetically modified seed varieties, yields in the eastern areas are much closer to those in western areas. In all areas, sugar production is enhanced by technologies that allow the desugaring of molasses, which otherwise would be a relatively low-value byproduct.

The largest region for sugar beet production is the Red River Valley of western Minnesota and eastern North Dakota. Area planted in the Red River region increased consistently through the 1990s and into the 2000s and has accounted for the majority of total planted U.S. sugar beet acreage. Long, cold winters aid the storage of sugar beets harvested in October and allow the slicing of sugar beets well into the following spring, thereby making more efficient use of slicing capacity at the factories. Michigan, which is typically the third-largest sugar beet producer by planted area, has a similar production system, although relatively warmer temperatures mean the slicing season is more constrained to the late winter and early spring.

Sugar beet production in the Northwest occurs in Idaho (which is typically the second-largest sugar beet-producing state by planted area), Washington, and portions of Oregon and California is typically on irrigated land. The sugar beet processing campaign is also shorter than in the Red River Valley, although investment in ventilated and covered storage techniques has allowed for a longer season and improved the quality of processed sugar beets. Contraction of production in this area is primarily due to the closure of three out of the four mills in California over the past few decades; with California production only occurring in the Imperial Valley.

Sugar beet production occurs in the Upper Great Plains (north-central Wyoming, Montana, and western North Dakota) and Central Great Plains (southeastern Wyoming, Colorado, and Nebraska). This region typically accounts for about one-eighth of national planted area. As in the Far West, most sugar beet production in the plains areas occurs on irrigated land. Investment in covered and ventilated storage facilities has also lengthened the slicing season and improved processed sugar beet quality and processing efficiency in these areas.

== Sugar refining ==
In the late 19th century, sugar refining in the United States was controlled by the American Sugar Refining Company. The federal government attempted to take antitrust action against the company, but was blocked by the Supreme Court's ruling in United States v. E. C. Knight Co. in 1895.

As of 2019, companies that operate sugar refineries in the United States include American Sugar Refining, whose refinery in Arabi, Louisiana, is the largest sugar refinery in North America.

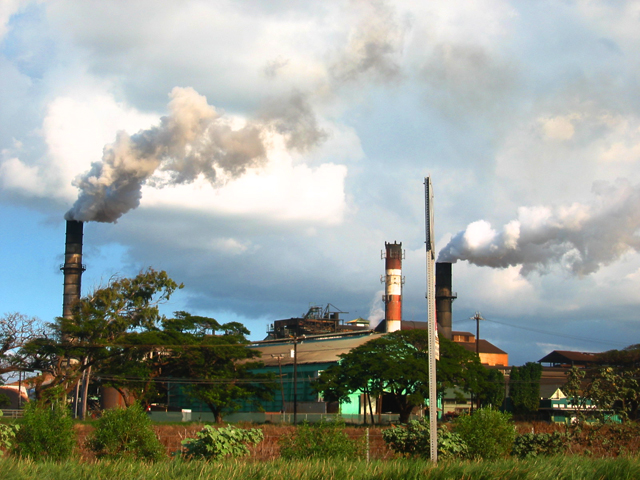
Hawaii Commercial Sugar (HC&S) sugar mill in Puʻunene, Hawaii

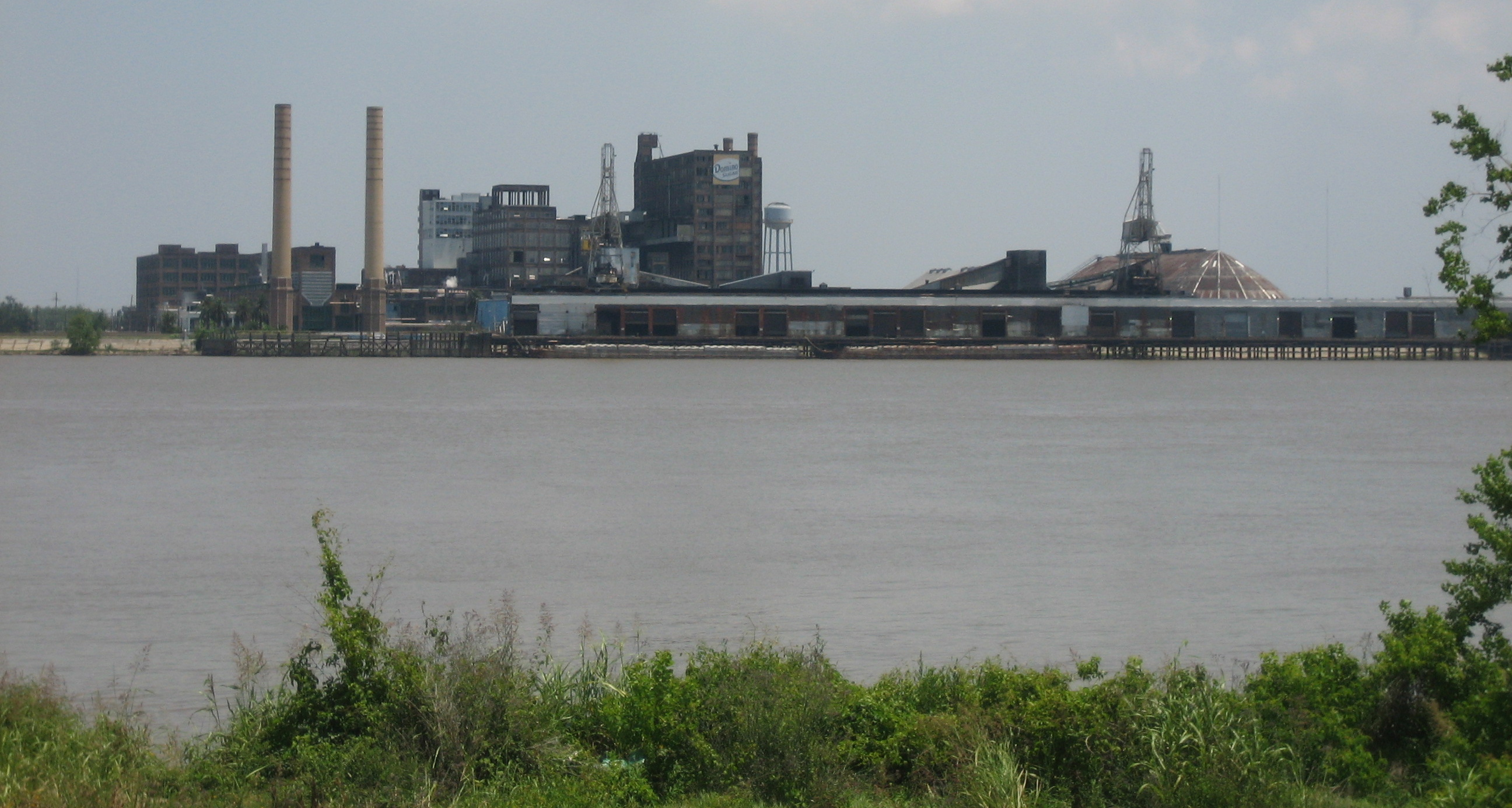
Sugar refinery in Arabi, Louisiana

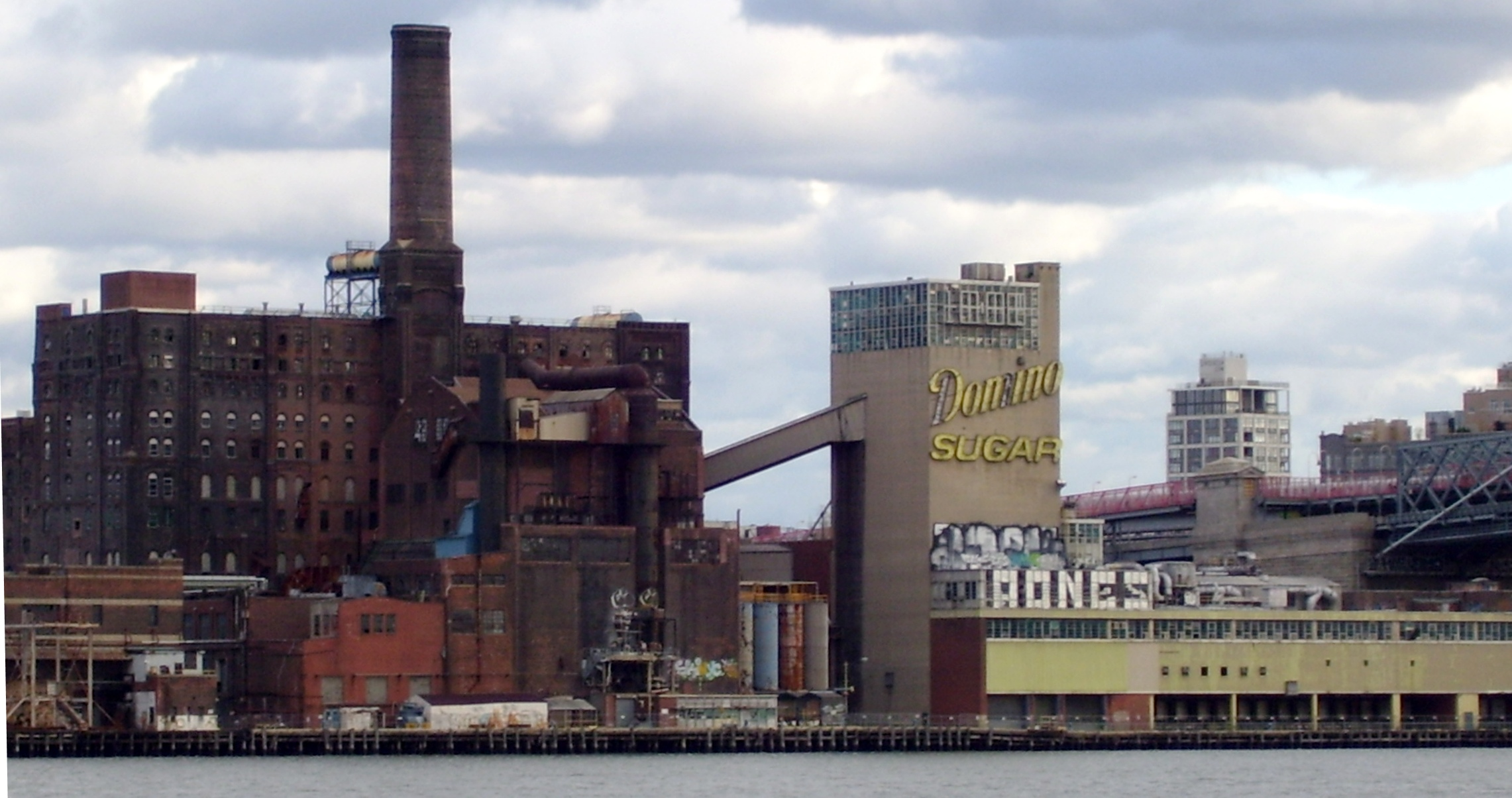
The Domino Sugar Refinery in Brooklyn, New York City, which ceased operations in 2004

== Government support ==
The United States Department of Agriculture administers a program to ensure a price floor for sugarcane and sugar beet producers by limiting the amount of sugar that can be produced. It does this using:

1. Loans to producers for price support
2. Limits on the amount of sugar each producer can sell
3. An import quota on foreign-made sugar
4. A program to convert excess sugar to ethanol fuel, when the other tools are not effective

In August 2014, the United States imposed import tariffs on Mexican sugarcane after U.S. farmers complained that Mexican sugar was flooding the market. After the government of Mexico objected, the two countries came to an agreement in December 2014, in which the U.S. would drop the tariffs while the Mexican government would enforce limits on sugar exports to the U.S.

== See also ==
- Hacienda Mercedita
- Sugar production in the Danish West Indies
- 2008 Georgia sugar refinery explosion
- Fanjul family
- Sugar Cane Growers Cooperative of Florida
