= John Sievenpiper =

Canadian nutrition scientist

John L. Sievenpiper is a Canadian nutrition scientist and professor at the University of Toronto's Department of Nutritional Sciences. He is known for his research on fructose and weight gain, which has reported that fructose does not have any more adverse health effects than other sources of calories. However, in March 2015 the World Health Organization recommended to reduce sugars intake among adults and children.

== Criticism ==
Sievenpiper's statements on fructose metabolism and weight gain were disputed by Robert Lustig. Lustig's experiments that contradicted Sievenpiper's statements were later revealed to be poorly done by peers and others in the field. He has come under fire for his research because some of it has been funded by the sugar and soft drink industries; he has also been retained as an expert witness by the Corn Refiners Association.
