= Mexico–United States sugarcane trade dispute =

In 2014, a trade dispute over sugarcane arose between Mexico and the United States. In August 2014 the United States implemented a series of sugar tariffs on Mexican plantation owners in order to establish minimum prices on sugar. These tariffs were issued after U.S. sugar growers criticized the United States for allowing Mexican sugar growers to flood the United States market with a much cheaper supply of sugar.

== Opposing positions ==
=== Mexico ===
Spanish settlers brought sugarcane to Mexico, where large plantations quickly began to rise, due to Mexico's high native population, plantation owners were able to find a large neighborhood workforce. After the Mexican Revolution in 1910 the Mexican sugar industry took a dramatic change and is now run by government agencies. Today, Mexico is one of the top ten largest sugar producers in the world. Sugar is the second largest crop in Mexico (after corn). Sugar crops span 1.6 million acres throughout 12 Mexican states and employ 2.5 million of Mexico's people.

As a part of North American Free Trade Agreement, the United States enabled free trading of all goods and services free of quotas. According to the United States quotas were mentioned in a previous letter, while Mexico claims that the letter does not take into account the amount of consumption, and that exports were not limited in the letter. If the United States were to maintain their stand on banning Mexico's sugar, Mexican plantation owners would be forced to lay off thousands of workers. Mexico also stands that they should not be punished for being able to produce the same good as U.S. farmers at a cheaper price.

=== The United States ===
Sugarcane crops were brought to the United States borders in 1619 in Jamestown, Virginia. During the mid eighteen hundreds the United States began to import half of their sugar from Cuba, while the other half was grown locally in Louisiana through America's Haitian slave population. The United States is the fifth largest sugar producer and also the fifth largest sugar consumer.

The United States sugar industry has had trade protection from the federal government since 1789. In 1990 the United States enacted the Food, Agriculture, Conservation, and Trade Act of 1990, which protected United States sugar producers at all-time high through price support that was given to farmers through loans, domestic market control, and tariff-rate quotas established to minimize sugar imported to the United States.

Through the Farm Bill, sugarcane farmers are able to sell the federal government their produced product as repayment of the loan or sell their sugar on the market if the going price is higher than the loan amount. The Farm Bill also states that domestically produced sugar must make up for at least 85% of the country's domestic sugar demand, leaving the rest of the world to makeup for the other 15%. According to the American Sugar Alliance, sugarcane farmers are to face losses of $1 billion due to foreign competitors selling their crops at a lower price then what it takes to produce them.

== World Trade Organization ==
In 2008 the United States met the minimum World Trade Organization standard of imports of 22,000 tons of refined sugar that must be allowed into the country. In March 2014, United States sugar producers began a petition stating that the Department of Commerce and the United States International Trade Commission were promoting Mexican sugar producers. In October 2014, Mexico urged that if a settlement between the two were not reached they would bring the case to the World Trade Organization. Mexico urged that United States resolve the issue before harvest began later in the year.

== Resolution ==
In December 2014, the United States and Mexico agreed to get rid of tariffs on imports of Mexican sugar. The United States agreed to enact measures that will limit the amount of sugar they will allow into the country from Mexico. The solution has caused dismay as implementing quotas on Mexican imported sugar to the United States was not a condition of the North American Free Trade Agreement that was established in the early 1990s.

== See also ==
- Second-tier Mexican sugar
