= Citizens for Health =

- Formation: 1992
- Type: Non-profit
- Headquarters: Washington, D.C., U.S.
- Region served: United States
- Chairman: Betsy Lehrfeld
- Main organ: Board of Directors
- Website: www.citizens.org

Citizens for Health is a U.S. non-profit organization which advocates on issues affecting nutrition, obesity, dietary supplements, food labeling and other health matters.

== Organization ==
Citizens for Health (CFH) was founded in 1992. As part of its advocacy, the group testifies to the U.S. Congress and the Food and Drug Administration about health and nutrition issues. The president and senior policy advisor of the group is James Gormley, an award-winning health-and-nutrition author and natural products industry advocate since 1995.

CFH has formulated a "food identity theft" website, which "alerts consumers about misleading food and beverage packaging and deceptive advertising."

Chairman Jim Turner died on January 25, 2022, after which Betsy Lehrfeld assumed the chairmanship of the organization.

== Issue advocacy ==
In 1993, the group deluged lawmakers in Congress with letters objecting to efforts by the FDA to regulate labeling for nutritional supplements. "For decades, the FDA has attempted to limit free speech and access to supplements by seizing products, raiding health clinics and insisting that the dissemination of information is tantamount to practicing medicine without a license," said the group's spokeswoman.

Between 1992 and 1994, Citizens for Health generated approximately 1 million signatures in support of the Dietary Supplement and Health Education Act of 1994.

In 2006, the group filed a petition with the FDA asking that agency to withdraw its approval of Splenda, a sugar substitute. The group cited concerns over possible side effects, including stomach pains and other digestion problems.

The group has also weighed in on the potential health effects from electromagnetic fields.

In 2011, Citizens for Health successfully opposed the original anti-supplement version of the FDA's New Dietary Ingredient (NDI) Draft Guidance—which was marked by James Gormley and Jim Turner delivering 12,686 Citizens for Health subscriber signed petitions to 11 U.S. congresspeople and the FDA.

In 2013, CFH cited a study that obesity rates increased in recent decades, and blamed high fructose corn syrup as a primary cause, noting sugar consumption had declined during the same period. CFH advocates frequently against the use of corn starch in food.

Overall, Citizens for Health has fought successful campaigns to bring awareness to the dangers of water fluoridation, sucralose, aspartame, trans fats (partially hydrogenated oils), high-fructose corn syrup and its labelling, GMOs and more.

== Controversy ==
Over the years, critics have charged that the group is a front for the sugar industry, attacking its business competitors under the umbrella of health without disclosing its ties to sugar. According to an article published in August 2012, the group had received more than half its funding in the year prior from The Sugar Association. The chairman of Citizens for Health said in an interview that the money from the sugar industry had been used to tell consumers that corn syrup isn't sugar. He acknowledged that while the organization has said it takes money from business groups, it could have done more to disclose its ties to the sugar industry. "We will make it clear as we go forward", he said.

In August 2013, a CFH news release stated that it is funded by "concerned consumers, non-profit partners, food growers, and businesses," and provides supporters with ways to access healthy food, non-toxic products, "and truthful, non-misleading health information." However, the group did not disclose which food growers or businesses were funding the organization.

== See also ==
- Sugar
- Public relations of high fructose corn syrup
- Diet and obesity/Sugar consumption
