= Second-tier Mexican sugar =

Second-tier Mexican sugar is a term in international trade referring to over-quota sugar exported by Mexico to the United States, subject to a North American Free Trade Agreement (NAFTA) tariff that declined 1.5¢/lb. for raw sugar, and 1.6¢/lb. for refined sugar, each year until it entered the United States without a tariff, effective January 1, 2008.

In the period prior to the end of the tariff for Mexican sugar, it became price competitive in the U. S. market whenever the applicable tariff, when added to the world market sugar price, plus the cost of transporting it from Mexico to U.S. Gulf ports (about 1.5¢/lb.), was below the loan forfeiture price support level created by the U.S. sugar program.

Over-quota sugar entering from countries other than Mexico continues to be subject to a much higher tariff, and is not subject to a treaty or statutory decline in tariff as was Mexican sugar. The tariff is set under the treaty agreements embodied in the United States participation in the World Trade Organization. This second-tier tariff is in effect a prohibitive tariff. When added to the world market price for sugar, it makes world sugar uncompetitive in cost, and serves to keep it from entering the U.S. market.

== See also ==
- Mexico–United States sugarcane trade dispute
