= Nutrition transition =

Shift in dietary consumption and energy expenditure

Nutrition transition is the shift in dietary consumption and energy expenditure that coincides with economic, demographic, and epidemiological changes. Specifically the term is used for the transition of developing countries from traditional diets high in cereal and fiber to more Western-pattern diets high in sugars, fat, and animal-source food.

== Historical framework ==
The nutrition transition model was first proposed in 1993 by Barry Popkin, and is the most cited framework in literature regarding the nutrition transition, although it has been subject to some criticism for being overly simplified. Popkin posits that two other historic transitions affect and are affected by nutritional transition. The first is the demographic transition, whereby a pattern of high fertility and high mortality transforms to one of low fertility and low mortality. Secondly, an epidemiological transition occurs, wherein a shift from a pattern of high prevalence of infectious diseases associated with malnutrition, and with periodic famine and poor environmental sanitation, to a pattern of high prevalence of chronic and degenerative diseases associated with urban-industrial lifestyles is shown. These concurrent and dynamically influenced transitions share an emphasis on the ways in which populations move from one pattern to the next. Popkin used five broad patterns to help summarize the nutrition transition model. While these patterns largely appear chronological, they are not restricted to certain periods of human history and still characterize certain geographic and socioeconomic subpopulations. The first pattern is that of collecting food, a characterization of hunter-gatherers, whose diets were high in carbohydrates and low in fat, especially saturated fat. The second pattern is defined by famine, a marked scarcity and reduced variation of the food supply. The third pattern is one of receding famine. Fruits, vegetables, and animal protein consumption increases, and starchy staples become less important in the diet. The fourth pattern is one of degenerative diseases onset by a diet high in total fat, cholesterol, sugar, and other refined carbohydrates and low in polyunsaturated fatty acids and fiber. This pattern is often accompanied by an increasingly sedentary lifestyle. The fifth pattern, and most recently emerging pattern, is characterized by a behavioral change reflective of a desire to prevent or delay degenerative diseases. Recent and rapid changes seen in developing countries from the second and third pattern to the fourth is the common focus of nutrition transition research and desire for policy that would emphasize a healthier overall diet characterizes the shift from the fourth to the fifth pattern.

The nutritional transition, like the demographic and epidemiological transitions, shows a change in human dietary and activity patterns over time, affecting overall nutritional status. The nutritional transition argues that the previous periods in the transition continue in certain geographic and socio-economic subpopulations at different times.

Pattern 1: Collecting food Hunter gatherer diet, high in carbohydrates and fiber, low in fat. Activity patterns are very high with little obesity.

Pattern 2: Famine Diet becomes less varied as people settle with periods of acute scarcity. Towards the end of this phase variation increases, but social stratification intensifies, with the most impoverished and women and children suffering the brunt of the burden of food scarcity.

Pattern 3: Receding Famine Increase in animal proteins and fruits and vegetables. Activity patterns shift to include more leisure activities. Current climate changes are effecting movement out of the famine and receding famine period.

Pattern 4: Nutritional-related NCD Diet becomes high in fat, cholesterol, sugar and other refined foods. This is accompanied by a continued shift to a sedentary lifestyle, which increases the prevalence of obesity and degenerative diseases. This matches on with the final phase of the epidemiological transition.

Pattern 5: Behaviour change In response to the shifts happening in pattern 4, behaviours pushed by governments, the health system or individuals are expected to prevent or delay the degenerative diseases.

== Relation to economic development ==
The nutrition transition has much of its roots in economic factors related to the development of a nation or subpopulations within a nation. It was once believed that current nutrition transition was endemic only to industrialized nations like the United States, but increasing research has indicated that not only is nutrition transition occurring most rapidly in low- and middle-income developing countries, the stress of its effects stands to burden the poorest populations of these countries the most as well. This shift is attributable to many causes. Globalization has played a large role in altering the access and availability of foods in formerly undeveloped nations. Demographic shifts from rural to urban areas are central to this as well as the liberalization of food markets, global food marketing, and the emergence of transnational food companies in developing countries. All these forces of globalization are creating lifestyle changes that contribute to the nutrition transition. Technological advancements are making previously arduous labor less difficult and thus altering energy expenditure that would have helped offset the caloric increases in the diet. Daily tasks and leisure are also affected by technological advancements and contributing to greater rates of inactivity. The aforementioned increases in calorie are due to increased consumption of edible oils, animal-source foods, caloric sweeteners, accompanied by reduced consumption of grains and fruits and vegetables. These changes play into human biological preferences seen across the world. Socioeconomic factors also play an important role as do cultural values tied to appearance and status.

=== Globalization and economic factors ===
The current nutrition transition seen in the emerging markets of Asia, Latin America, the Middle East, North Africa, and urban areas of sub-Saharan Africa is largely a product of globalization. International food trade, investment, commercialization and marketing are drastically impacting the availability of and access to energy-dense, but nutrient-deficient foods causing the aforementioned shift from traditional diet. Another byproduct of globalization has been a marked demographic transition in these countries from rural areas to urban ones. Urban populations are more susceptible to current trends in nutrition transition because of the improved transportation, commercial food distribution and marketing, less labor-intensive-occupations, and changes in household eating habits and structure. The liberalization of food markets has had a drastic effect on consumption patterns across the globe. Liberalization and commercialization of domestic agricultural markets are opening up food trading since this is needed to compete in the world market. This had led to changes in the types of food produced, and increases in amounts of food imported into developing countries, which affects the relative availability and prices of different foods. Food demand is being shaped by increases in income and urbanization. As these rapidly developing nations continue to accrue high incomes per capita, their food spending is increasing as well. They elect to use these higher incomes on more calorically-dense foods that are sweeter and higher in fats. For example, in China, for the same extra dollar of income, an average Chinese person is purchasing higher calorie food today than that person would have done for the same extra yuan in 1990. Rapid urbanization has also shaped food demand globally. The demographic transition from rural areas to urban populations is a well documented byproduct of globalization and technological advancements. This is because agro-food systems have replaced local subsistence farming in many rural areas. The supply of food is directly sculpted by increasing demand in these areas with growing income. Urbanization is increasing access to new foods and therefore altering the supply chain. This is why transnational food companies have grown so rapidly over the past few decades. These companies are making processed and fast foods much cheaper and more widely available through the growth of transnational supermarkets and chain restaurants. Food is not only easier to obtain in urban areas; it is also cheaper and less time-consuming to acquire which creates an imbalance between energy intake and output. Their advertising and promotional strategies have a strong effect on consumer choices and desire. Foreign direct investment is also stimulating processed food sales in these supermarkets by lowering prices and creating incentives for advertising and promotion. A large proportion of this advertising is for energy-dense processed foods and is being directed at children and youth. Technological and transportation advancements are reducing the barriers that once limited global food trade. These techniques are critical to facilitating the production and distribution needed in a global market. Better preservation techniques are helping to reduce waste which contributes to lower prices for consumers. Technology is creating higher yields which also reduce prices.

=== Lifestyle changes ===
The forces of globalization are strongly influencing many lifestyle changes in developing countries. Major changes in economic structures from agrarian economies to industrialized economies are reducing physical activity levels in occupations around the world. Even in agricultural work, gas-powered technologies are helping reduce the energy expenditure needed to perform pertinent farming tasks. These reduced activity levels are not just seen in the workplace, but in homes as well. Daily tasks that were once laborious engagements are now much easier with the help of technological advancements, with examples being appliances such as washing machines, refrigerators, and stoves. Also, recent leaps in the efficiency of food production (canning, refrigeration, freezing, and packaging being a few of the most notable) and improvements in cookware, such as the introduction of improved metal stoves which use fossil fuels and microwave ovens, have helped reduce domestic efforts greatly.

Leisure is being greatly impacted as well. Activities such as playing sports outside are being replaced with television watching and computer games. Decreasing physical leisure activities can also be contributed to urbanization wherein access to fields needed to play such games as soccer are not available due to such dense populations and their subsequent demand for land. Other important lifestyle changes fueling the nutrition transition relate to the composition of diets. These dietary shifts have been mentioned previously several times but deserve greater scrutiny. Diets rich in legumes, other vegetables, and coarse grains are disappearing in all regions and countries. Taking their place are diets characterized by fat-rich edible and vegetable oils, cheap animal-source foods high in fat and protein, and artificially sweetened foods high in sugar and refined carbohydrates. Consumption of caloric beverages such as soda represented 21% of all calorie intake in Mexico from 1996 to 2002. Processes of globalization that have influenced food markets have made these products much cheaper, flavorful, and easier to produce which has in turn driven up their demand. So while globalization and the accompanying economic development has created higher levels of food security for developing countries, the ongoing trend of eating in a more Western fashion has caused increased rates of adverse health and childhood obesity.

=== Biopsychosocial forces ===
The desires for these new diets and lifestyles are very understandable from a biological and psychosocial perspective. For example, humans have an innate preference for sweets dating back to hunter-gatherer populations. These sweets signaled a good source of energy for hunter-gatherers who were not food secure. This same concept also relates to human predisposition for energy-dense fatty foods. These foods were needed to sustain long journeys and provided a safety net for times of famine. Humans also desire to eliminate physical exertion. This can explain the shift to more sedentary lifestyles from occupational, domestic, and leisurely activities that were previously much more physical taxing. Socioeconomic and cultural influences also contribute to lifestyle changes associated with nutrition transition. The transfer of tastes by means of tourism and open food trade has introduced developing nations to foods previously enjoyed only by industrialized countries. Global food advertising and promotion has only further cemented these dietary changes. Additionally some cultures view obese body types in high regard as they relate them to power, beauty and affluence. Several studies suggest that socioeconomic status contributes greatly to nutrition transition wherein there is a lack of healthy food alternatives completely or a lack of affordable healthy food alternatives.

== Health and economic outcomes ==
While increased food security is a major benefit of global nutrition transition, there are a myriad of coinciding negative health and economic consequences. Rates of obesity are soaring across the world and recent trends suggest that incidences of overnutrition in coming decades will overtake that of undernutrition in the developing world. As well there will be a marked epidemiological shift from infectious disease to degenerative, noncommunicable disease, NCDs in these countries. As it stands now these countries face a unique paradox in having to deal with both over- and undernutrition, a dual burden of malnutrition, that will inevitably be accompanied by both infectious and noncommunicable diseases, a dual burden of disease. The economic impact will be enormous as well. In addition to reduced productivity, the health systems of these countries stand to face a tremendous burden.

=== Health outcomes ===
The foremost health outcome of the global nutrition transition will be an increased prevalence of obesity across the world. Obesity prevalence in developing countries increased from 2.3% in 1988 to 19.6% in 1998. Incidences are highest among women and children, indicating health inequities across global populations. Obesity is strongly linked to degenerative, NCDs such as coronary heart disease, diabetes, stroke, and hypertension. WHO estimates place NCDs as the principal global cause of morbidity and mortality, and global prevalence of chronic diseases is projected to increase substantially over the next 2 decades in developing countries. Between 1990 and 2020, mortality from cardiovascular diseases, CVDs, in developing countries is expected to increase 120% for women and 137% for men compared to 29 and 49% respectively in industrialized countries. In many of the countries facing epidemics of overnutrition, there is still widespread undernutrition.

=== Double burden of nutrition ===
The double burden of malnutrition is typically the presence of both undernutrition and obesity within a population. Colleen Doak and Barry Popkin first initiated discussion of this phenomenon and explored some potential causes. Subsequently, a large body of literature has emerged.

=== Dual burden of disease ===
Deemed as a developmental challenge of epidemic proportions, the double burden of disease (DBD) is an emerging global health challenge, that exists predominantly in low-to-middle income countries. More specifically, the DBD refers to the dual burden of communicable and non-communicable diseases (NCD). Today, over 90 per cent of the world's disease burden occurs in developing regions, and most are attributed to communicable diseases. Communicable diseases are infectious diseases that "can be passed between people through proximity, social contact or intimate contact". Common diseases in this category include whooping cough or tuberculosis, HIV/AIDs, malaria, influenza (the flu), and mumps. As low-to-middle income countries continue to develop, the types of diseases that affecting populations within these countries shifts primarily from infectious diseases, such as diarrhea and pneumonia, to primarily non-communicable diseases, such as cardiovascular disease, cancer and obesity. This shift is increasingly being referred to as the risk transition. Thus, as globalization and the proliferation of pre-packaged foods continues, traditional diets and lifestyles are changing in many developing countries. As such, it is becoming increasingly common to see low-to-middle income countries battle with century old issues such as food insecurity and undernutrition, in addition to emerging health epidemics such as chronic heart disease, hypertension, stroke, and diabetes. Diseases once characteristic of industrialized nations, are increasingly becoming health challenges of epidemic proportions in many low-to-middle income countries.

=== Economic impact ===
The economic impact of these rising rates and dual burdens of disease looks to be tremendous. Disability, decreased quality of life, greater use of health care facilities and increased absenteeism are strongly associated with obesity. With inadequate resources, poorly constructed health systems, and a general lack of expertise to address the burden of infectious diseases, the disease burden for low-to-middle countries is exacerbated by the rising rate of non-communicable diseases. This is often attributed to the fact that these countries by nature have ill-health systems that possess inadequate resources to detect and prevent many non-communicable diseases." Social constructs within these countries often amplify the risk of the double burden, as inequality, gender, and other social determinants often have a role to play in disparate access and allocation of health services and resources. If current trends are maintained, the World Health Organization predicts that low-and-middle income countries will be unable to support the burden of disease within the foreseeable future.

== Implications for policy ==
Countries worldwide have made several, varied efforts to address the consequences of the nutrition transition. These policies target the food environment, governance, food system, or education and can be generally classified into the following categories:

=== Public nutrition education policy ===
Nutrition education intends to facilitate healthy behavioral changes, at the individual level. Dietary guidelines, specifically, promote public awareness of nutritional needs. Over 60 countries in the Global North and South have established national dietary guidelines.

=== Nutrition labeling policy ===
Nutrition labeling for food packages and in restaurants may encourage consumers to choose healthier foods. Nutrition labeling has been emphasized as important in influencing food choices and potentially reducing the intake of fat, sugar, and sodium.

=== School-focused policy ===
Schools are viewed as a primary target of intervention for implementing nutrition-related policies. Children and adolescents are particularly vulnerable to exposure to unhealthy foods before, during, and after school. Children are more susceptible to developing early obesity and are likely to remain obese throughout adulthood. School policies are varied and specific to the political, economic, and social climates of a place. They can focus on increasing nutritional standards, promoting active lifestyles, regulating school meal programs, and banning the sale of certain foods and beverages in and around schools.

=== Food marketing regulation ===
Food marketing, via several media outlets – television, the Internet, packaging, popular culture – has been an effective strategy for influencing and changing consumers' food choices, particularly among children. Several studies have indicated the association between exposure to food advertising and food choices and beliefs. The impact of advertising has led to support for government level regulation of food marketing. Countries have implemented voluntary or mandatory restrictions on advertisements of unhealthy food products. Food companies are also urged to implement responsible food marketing strategies. Efforts by corporations should reverse drivers of food consumption, including convenience, low cost, good taste, and nutritional knowledge. Recommendations include downsizing packaging, reducing serving sizes, and recreating formulas to decrease caloric content.

=== Taxation ===
Stemming from the success of taxation of tobacco products in reducing tobacco usage, policy makers and researchers have adopted a parallel approach for reducing obesity. The WHO supported economic policies as a method of influencing food prices and promoting healthy eating in public spaces (cite, 2008). Tax policies, in the form of sin taxes or Pigovian taxes, generally target unhealthy food and drink products, including the "fat tax", "junk food tax", and of particular popularity, the tax on sugar-sweetened beverages (SSBs). Taxation is intended to combat obesity by increasing the price of SSBs and unhealthy foods and in turn, reducing their consumption, as well as generating revenue that may be used towards obesity prevention programs or promotion of fruit and vegetable consumption. However, the effectiveness of taxation remains under scrutiny – economists argue that taxes are inefficient for combating obesity and can result in greater losses for consumers.

=== Comprehensive approach ===
The literature suggests that it may be ideal for governments to adopt a holistic policy approach to address the obesity epidemic, given the associated social conditions. "Policy package" recommendations have been a supported framework for preventing obesity and diet-related non-communicable diseases worldwide because they are adaptable to country-specific circumstances. For instance, the NOURISHING framework summarizes key avenues for action and policy but is flexible to suit a range of national and local contexts. The World Health Organization has called for governments to have multi-faceted interventions, focusing on food security, food safety, healthy lifestyle, and nutrition. Given the scope of the pandemic but the diverse place-based trends and risk factors, appropriate and adequate intervention calls for policy change across multiple levels – population and individual – and the need for international collaboration. At the same time, evaluations of programs and initiatives on their impact on obesity are necessary to both enhance efficacy of existing interventions and provide a foundation for future interventions.

== Case studies ==
Case studies for individual nations are plentiful. The BRICS countries are specifically studied in great depth because of their rapidly transitioning economies, but more slowly developing nations are well studied too.

=== Industrialized nations ===
Case studies in the United States and United Kingdom are particularly bountiful.

=== Developing countries ===
Reports based in Latin America, Asia, the Middle East, North Africa, and developed areas of sub-Saharan Africa can be found in a wide range of academic literature.

=== Aboriginal populations ===
Worldwide, Aboriginal populations have experienced radical changes in diet. Traditional diets and food intakes have been replaced by diets consisting of foods high in fat, sugar and salt. This change in diet is related to the life-style changes during the last century: for example, Hunter-gatherer communities became more settled, and traditional food gathering methods changed. The nutrition transition has been linked to increased rates of non-communicable diseases amongst Aboriginal populations. Industrialization introduced a less complicated way to access food; a protein rich diet was replaced by white bread, processed food and sugary beverages.

Traditional food of First Nations included burbot filet (or muscle) and moose liver. Food consumption provided essential fats (i.e., fatty acids) and proteins that played a key medicinal role in the prevention and reduction of obesity and obesity-related diseases.

=== In the world's two most populous countries ===
China and India are two similar powers in terms of demographics and geography. However, the two countries have very different histories and beliefs that impact the food transition in both populations today. These notable differences have several factors and consequences that play an important role in the challenges ahead. According to the classical theory, the main phases of the food transition of these two countries have taken place and the phenomenon should end in a few years once these countries are developed and have stabilized their growth.

However, the new global economic and environmental challenges, coupled with the unprecedented population growth of these two countries, are likely to disrupt the classic pattern that developed countries have previously experienced. In this context of climate change, economic choices, and a growing need to ensure food and health security for their populations, it is difficult to know which of India or China, with two very different food strategies, will complete their food transition in the best way.

In this opposition, India is a mysterious country that is adopting a novel strategy. Indeed, it is not very open to the outside world at the moment, which allows it to maintain a strong cultural identity. This is why, unlike other developing countries, there are very few American or European companies on their territory, for example in the food sector. Thus, they are much less influenced by the outside world, mass consumption, capitalism, advertising and its consequences. This added to the fact that the Indian population is younger explains that Indians are less affected by problems like obesity.

Vegetarian diets have long history in India and remain an important part of the country's food culture. These dietary practices are relevant to discussions about sustainable food consumption and climate change. However, dietary habits vary across regions and population groups and continue to evolve in response to economic, social, and environmental factors.

China, on the other hand, has the advantage of being much more economically powerful, with higher agricultural productivity and resources that allow it to be more flexible to changes. Finally, the country has a very high degree of self-sufficiency in staple grains but relies heavily on imported feed grains and edible oil. China's persistent pursuit of grain self-sufficiency, which includes maintaining the world's largest grain reserve, allows it to have a much lower rate of malnourishment than its neighbour and greater resilience during food crises. Finally, since the food transition started earlier, China should be stable more quickly.

== See also ==
- Epidemiological transition
- Demographic transition
- List of basic nutrition topics
- Human nutrition
- Western pattern diet
- Nutrition disorder
- Malnutrition
- Overnutrition
- Non-communicable diseases
- Metabolic syndrome
- Obesity
- Epidemiology of obesity
- Management of obesity
- Social determinants of obesity
- Genetics of obesity
- Diet and obesity
- Obesity associated morbidity
- Childhood obesity
- Body mass index
- Food insecurity
- Fat acceptance movement
- Fat tax
- Globalization
- Economic globalization
- Emerging markets
- Sociology of health and illness
- Medical sociology
- Public health
- Population health
- Community health
