= Epidemiological transition =

Theory describing changing population patterns

Diagram showing sharp birth rate and death rate decreases between Time 1 and Time 4, the congruent increase in population caused by delayed birth rate decreases, and the subsequent re-leveling of population growth by Time 5.

In demography and medical geography, epidemiological transition is a theory which "describes changing population patterns in terms of fertility, life expectancy, mortality, and leading causes of death." For example, a phase of development marked by a sudden increase in population growth rates brought by improved food security and innovations in public health and medicine, can be followed by a re-leveling of population growth due to subsequent declines in fertility rates. Such a transition can account for the replacement of infectious diseases by chronic diseases over time due to increased life span as a result of improved health care and disease prevention. This theory was originally posited by Abdel Omran in 1971.

== Theory ==
Omran divided the epidemiological transition of mortality into three phases, in the last of which chronic diseases replace infection as the primary cause of death. These phases are:

1. The Age of Pestilence and Famine: Mortality is high and fluctuating, precluding sustained population growth, with low and variable life expectancy vacillating between 20 and 40 years. It is characterized by an increase in infectious diseases, malnutrition and famine, common during the Neolithic age. Before the first transition, the hominid ancestors were hunter-gatherers and foragers, a lifestyle partly enabled by a small and dispersed population. However, unreliable and seasonal food sources put communities at risk for periods of malnutrition.
2. The Age of Receding Pandemics: Mortality progressively declines, with the rate of decline accelerating as epidemic peaks decrease in frequency. Average life expectancy increases steadily from about 30 to 50 years. Population growth is sustained and begins to be exponential.
3. The Age of Degenerative and Man-Made Diseases: Mortality continues to decline and eventually approaches stability at a relatively low level. Mortality is increasingly related to degenerative diseases, cardiovascular disease (CVD), cancer, violence, accidents, and substance abuse, some of these due primarily to human behavior patterns. The average life expectancy at birth rises gradually until it exceeds 50 years. It is during this stage that fertility becomes the crucial factor in population growth.

In 1998 Barrett et al. proposed two additional phases in which cardiovascular diseases diminish as a cause of mortality due to changes in culture, lifestyle and diet, and diseases associated with aging increase in prevalence. In the final phase, disease is largely controlled for those with access to education and health care, but inequalities persist.

1. The Age of Declining CVD Mortality, Aging and Emerging Diseases: Technological advances in medicine stabilize mortality and the birth rate levels off. Emerging diseases become increasingly lethal due to antibiotic resistance, new pathogens like Ebola or Zika, and mutations that allow old pathogens to overcome human immunity.
2. The Age of Aspired Quality of Life with Persistent Inequalities: The birth rate declines as lifespan is extended, leading to an age-balanced population. Socioeconomic, ethnic, and gender inequalities continue to manifest differences in mortality and fertility.

The epidemiological transition occurs when a country undergoes the process of transitioning from developing nation to developed nation status. The developments of modern healthcare and medicine, such as antibiotics, drastically reduce infant mortality rates and extend average life expectancy which, coupled with subsequent declines in fertility rates, reflects a transition to chronic and degenerative diseases as more important causes of death.

The theory of epidemiological transition uses patterns of health and disease as well as their forms of demographic, economical and sociological determinants and outcomes.

== History ==
Population pyramids of developed and developing nations, showing how increased lifespan and changes in fertility alter the population. Each bar represents an age category and its percent of the total population, with males to the left and females to the right.

In general human history, Omran's first phase occurs when human population sustains cyclic, low-growth, and mostly linear, up-and-down patterns associated with wars, famine, epidemic outbreaks, as well as small golden ages, and localized periods of "prosperity". In early pre-agricultural history, infant mortality rates were high and average life expectancy low. Today, life expectancy in developing countries remains relatively low, as in many Sub-Saharan African nations where it typically doesn't exceed 60 years of age.

The second phase involves improved nutrition as a result of stable food production along with advances in medicine and the development of health care systems. Mortality in Western Europe and North America was halved during the 19th century due to closed sewage systems and clean water provided by public utilities, with a particular benefit for children of both sexes and to females in the adolescent and reproductive age periods, probably because the susceptibility of these groups to infectious and deficiency diseases is relatively high. An overall reduction in malnutrition enabled populations to better resist infectious disease. Treatment breakthroughs of importance included the initiation of vaccination during the early nineteenth century, and the discovery of penicillin in the mid 20th century, which led respectively to a widespread and dramatic decline in death rates from previously serious diseases such as smallpox and sepsis. Population growth rates surged in the 1950s, 1960's and 1970's to 1.8% per year and higher, with the world gaining 2 billion people between 1950 and the 1980s. A decline in mortality without a corresponding decline in fertility leads to a population pyramid assuming the shape of a bullet or a barrel, as young and middle-age groups comprise equivalent percentages of the population.

Omran's third phase occurs when human birth rates drastically decline from highly positive replacement rates to stable replacement numbers. In several European nations replacement rates have even become negative. This transition generally represents the net effect of individual choices on family size and the ability to implement those choices. Omran gives three possible factors tending to encourage reduced fertility rates:

1. Bio-physiologic factors, associated with reduced infant mortality and the expectation of longer life in parents;
2. Socioeconomic factors, associated with childhood survival and the economic challenges of large family size; and
3. Psychological or emotional factors, where society as a whole changes its rationale and opinion on family size and parental energies are redirected to qualitative aspects of child-raising.

=== Impact on fertility ===
Improvements in female and childhood survival that occur with the shift in health and disease patterns discussed above have distinct and seemingly contradictory effects on fertility. While better health and greater longevity enjoyed by females of reproductive age tend to enhance fertility, the reduced risks to infants and young children that occurs in the later stages of the transition tends to have the opposite effect: prolonged breastfeeding associated with reduced mortality among infants and toddlers, together with parental recognition of improved childhood survival, tend to lengthen birth intervals and depress overall reproductive rates.

=== Economic impact ===
The transition may also be associated with demographic movements to urban areas, and a shift from agriculture and labor-based production output to technological and service-sector-based economies. This shift in demographic and disease profiles is currently under way in most developing nations, however every country is unique and transition speed is based on numerous geographical and sociopolitical factors. Whether the transition is due to socioeconomic improvements (as in developed countries) or by modern public health programs (as has been the case in many developing countries), the lowering of mortality and of infectious disease tends to increase economic productivity through better functioning of adult members of the labor force and through an increase in the proportion of children who survive and mature into productive members of society.

== Models of transition ==
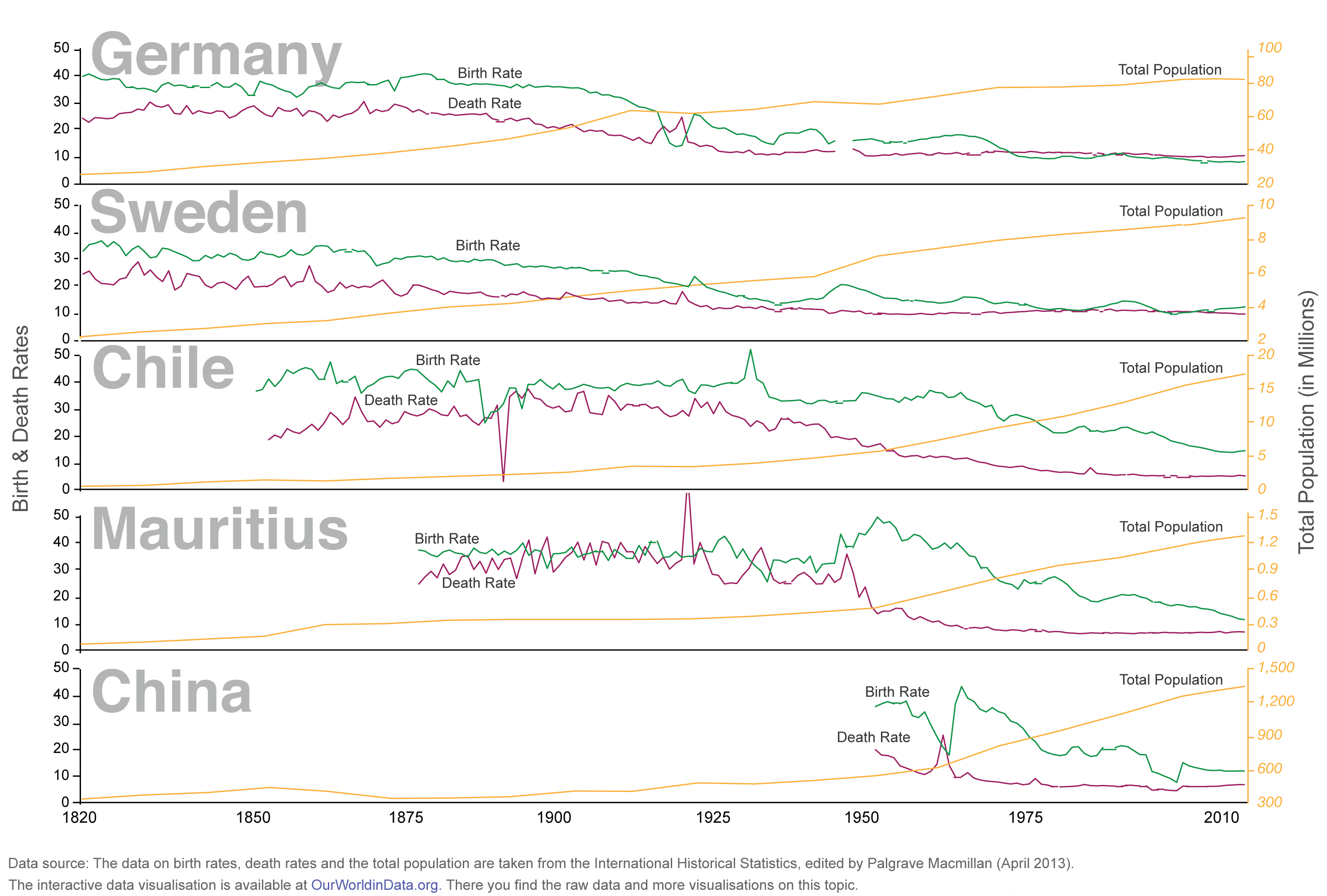
Demographic change in Germany, Sweden, Chile, Mauritius, China from 1820 to 2010. Pink line: crude death rate (CDR), green line: (crude) birth rate (CBR), yellow line: population.

Omran developed three models to explain the epidemiological transition.

1. Classical/Western model: (England, Wales, and Sweden) Countries in Western Europe typically experienced a transition that began in the late eighteenth century and lasted over 150 years to the post-World War II era. The lengthy transition allowed fertility to decline at virtually the same rate that mortality also declined. Germany might be considered another example of this model.
2. Accelerated model: (Japan) Japan experienced a rapid transition as a result of a few decades of intensive war-driven industrialization followed by postwar occupation. The accelerated transition follows a pattern similar to the Classical/Western Model except that it occurs within a much shorter time span. China might be considered another example of this model.
3. Contemporary/Delayed model: (Chile, Ceylon) Due to slow economic development, Chile and Ceylon (Sri Lanka) experienced delayed transitions that have lasted into the 21st century. Medical and public health improvements have reduced mortality, while the birth rate remains high. Cultural traditions combined with political and economic instability and food insecurity mean that mortality for women and children fluctuates more than for men. Mauritius might be considered another example of this model.

== Determinants of disease ==
1. Ecobiological: changing patterns of immunity, vectors (such as the black rat partially responsible for spreading bubonic plague in Europe), and the movement of pathogenic organisms. These alter the frequency of epidemic infectious diseases as well as chronic infections and other illnesses that affect fertility and infant mortality.
2. Socioeconomic: political and cultural determinants, including standards of living, health habits, hygiene and nutrition. Hygiene and nutrition are included here, rather than under medical determinants, because their improvement in western countries was largely a byproduct of social change rather than a result of medical design.
3. Medical/Public health: specific preventive and curative measures used to combat disease, including improved public sanitation, immunization and the development of decisive therapies. Medical and public health factors came into play late in the western transition, but have an influence early in certain accelerated and contemporary transitions.

== Other perspectives ==
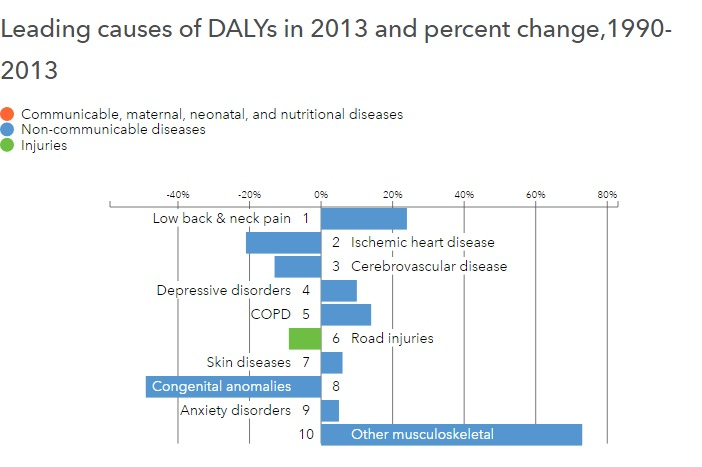
Leading causes of DALYs and percentage change between 1990 and 2013, Chile

McMichael, Preston, and Murray offer a more nuanced view of the epidemiological transition, highlighting macro trends and emphasizing that there is a change from infectious to non-communicable disease, but arguing that it happens differently in different contexts.

One of the first to refine the idea of the epidemiological transition was Preston, who in 1976 proposed the first comprehensive statistical model relating mortality and cause-specific mortality. Preston used life tables from 43 national populations, including both developed countries such as United States and England and developing countries such as Chile, Colombia, Costa Rica, Guatemala, México, Panama, Taiwan, Trinidad and Tobago, and Venezuela. He used multiple linear regression to analyze the cause-specific-age-standardized death rates by sex. The estimated slopes represented the proportional contribution of each cause to a unit change in the total mortality rate. With the exception of neoplasms in both sexes and cardiovascular disease in males, all of the estimated slopes were positive and statistically significant. This demonstrated that the mortality rates from each specific cause were expected to decline as total mortality declined. The major causes accounting for the decline were all infectious and parasitic diseases.

McMichael et al. argue (2004) that the epidemiological transition has not taken place homogeneously in all countries. Countries have varied in the speed with which they go through the transition as well as what stage of the transition they are in. The global burden of disease website provides visual comparisons of the disease burdens of countries and the changes over time. The epidemiological transition correlates with changes in life expectancy. Worldwide, mortality rates have decreased as both technological and medical advancements have led to a tremendous decrease in infectious diseases. With fewer people dying from infectious diseases, there is a rising prevalence of chronic and/or degenerative diseases in the older surviving population.

McMichael et al. describe life expectancy trends as grouped into three categories, as suggested by Casselli et al.:

1. Rapid gains among countries such as Chile, Mexico and Tunisia that have strong economic and technical relationships with developed countries
2. Slower plateauing gains mostly among developed countries with slower increases in life expectancy (for example, France)
3. Frank reversals occurring mostly in developing countries where the HIV epidemic led to a significant decline in life expectancy, and countries in the former Soviet Union, afflicted by social upheavals, heavy alcohol consumption and institutional inadequacy (for example, Zimbabwe and Botswana)

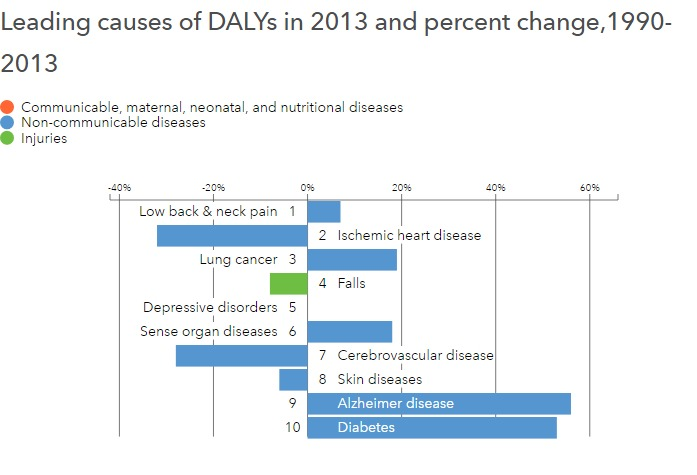
Leading causes of DALYs and percentage change between 1990 and 2013, France

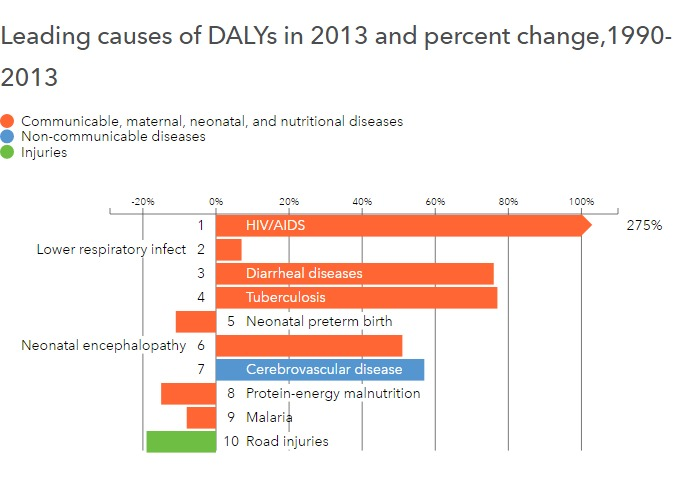
Leading causes of DALYs and percentage change between 1990 and 2013, Zimbabwe

Murray and Lopez (1996) offered one of the most important cause-of-death models as part of the 1990 Global Burden of Disease Study. Their "cause of death" patterns sought to describe the fraction of deaths attributed to a set of mutually exclusive and collectively exhaustive causes. They divided diseases into three cause groups and made several important observations:

1. Group 1 - communicable, maternal, perinatal, and nutritional: These causes of death decline much faster than overall mortality and comprise a small fraction of deaths in wealthier countries.
2. Group 2 - non-communicable diseases: These causes of death are a major challenge for countries that have completed or nearly completed the epidemiological transition.
3. Group 3 - injuries: This cause of death is most variable within and across different countries and is less predictive of all-cause mortality.

The regression approach underlying the Global Burden of Disease received some critique in light of real-world violations of the model's "mutually exclusive and collectively exhaustive" cause attribution.

Building on the existing body of evidence, Salomon and Murray (2002), further add nuances to the traditional theory of epidemiological transition by disintegrating it based on disease categories and different age-sex groups, positing that the epidemiological transition entails a real transition in the cause composition of age-specific mortality, as opposed to just a transition in the age structure. Using Global Burden of Disease data from 1990, they disintegrate the transition across three cause groups: communicable diseases, non-communicable diseases and injuries, seeking to explain the variation in all-cause mortality as a function of cause-specific mortality in 58 countries from 1950 to 1998. This analysis validates the underlying premise of the classic epidemiological transition theory: as total mortality declines and income rises, communicable diseases cause less and less mortality compared to non-communicable diseases and injuries. Decomposing this overall impact by age-sex groups, they find that for males, when overall mortality decreases, the importance of non-communicable diseases (NCDs) increases relative to the other causes with an age-specific impact on the role of injuries, whereas for women, both NCDs and injuries gain a more significant share with mortality decreases. For children over one year, they find that there is a gradual transition from communicable to non-communicable diseases, with injuries remaining significant in males. For young adults, the epidemiological transition is particularly different: for males, there is a shift from injuries to NCDs in lower income settings, and the opposite in higher-income settings; for females, rising income also signifies a shift from NCDs to injuries, but the role of injuries becomes more significant over time compared to males. Finally, for both males and females over 50, there is no epidemiological transition impact on the cause composition of mortality.

== Current evidence ==
The majority of the literature on the epidemiological transition that was published since these seminal papers confirms the context-specific nature of the epidemiological transition: while there is an overall all-cause mortality decline, the nature of cause-specific mortality declines differs across contexts. Increasing obesity rates in high-income countries are further confirming the epidemiological transition theory as the epidemic leads to an increase in NCDs. The picture is more nuanced in low- and middle-income countries, where there are signs of a protracted transition with the double burden of communicable and noncommunicable disease. A recent review of cause-specific mortality rates from 12 low- and middle-income countries in Asia and sub-Saharan Africa by Santosa and Byass (2016) shows that broadly, low- and middle-income countries are rapidly transitioning to lower total mortality and lower infectious disease mortality. A more macro-level analysis from the Global Burden of Disease data conducted by Murray and others (2015) finds that while there is a global trend towards decreasing mortality and increasing NCD prevalence, this global trend is being driven by country-specific effects as opposed to a broader transition; further, there are varying patterns within and between countries, which makes it difficult to have a single unified theory of epidemiological transition.

A theory of epidemiological transition aimed at explaining not just describing changes in population disease and mortality profiles would need to encompass the role in different morbid conditions of infectious diseases contracted over the life course. The concept of linear transition from infectious diseases to other conditions referred to as degenerative or non-communicable, was based on a false dichotomy as common microorganisms have now been confirmed as causal agents in several conditions recorded as the underlying cause of many deaths. A revised transition model might focus more on disease aetiology and the determinants of cause-specific mortality change, while encompassing the possibility that infectious causation may be established for other morbid conditions through the vast amount of ongoing research into associations with infectious diseases.

== See also ==
- Demographic transition
- Medical anthropology
- Medical sociology
- Nutrition transition
