= Barry Popkin =

American nutrition and obesity researcher

Barry Michael Popkin
- Born: May 23, 1944 (age 82); Superior, Wisconsin
- Education: Cornell University, University of Wisconsin
- Known for: Nutrition transition
- Spouse: Anne-Linda Furstenberg (d. 2002)
- Children: One son
- Scientific career
- Fields: Economics, nutrition epidemiology
- Workplaces: University of North Carolina at Chapel Hill
- Thesis: Vitamin A deficiency in the Philippines: the development and analysis of alternative interventions (1974)
- Doctoral advisor: David Call, Michael Latham
- Other academic advisors: Ralph Andreano, Lee Hansen, Richard Easterlin, David Call, Daniel Sisler

Barry Michael Popkin (born May 23, 1944) is an American nutrition and obesity researcher at the Carolina Population Center and the W.R. Kenan Jr. Distinguished Professor of Nutrition (earlier he was the Carla Smith Chamblee Distinguished Professor of Global Nutrition) at the University of North Carolina at Chapel Hill School of Public Health, where he just retired as director of the Global Food Research Program. He developed the concept of "nutrition transition". He is the author of over 650 journal articles and a book, The World is Fat, translated into a dozen languages.

== Early life and education ==
Popkin was born in 1944 and grew up in Superior, Wisconsin; neither of his parents had a college education. Popkin describes the food he ate in Superior as "...typical of the way most Americans handled food in the first half of the 20th century." He attended the University of Wisconsin, graduating in 1967. He spent the 1965-66 year in India living partly in a squatter area and partly at Delhi University. After which he spent one year doing graduate work at the University of Pennsylvania. In 1968, he returned to the University of Wisconsin, and received his MS from there one year later. After a period of civil rights work, he worked at the University of Wisconsin Institute for Research on Poverty for a year and then in 1972 moved to Boston to work. Then he began to work at Cornell University in the fall of 1972 and began his thesis work in Jan 1973. In July 1974, he received his PhD in agricultural economics from Cornell University.

== Career ==
From 1971 to 1972 Popkin worked as a research economist at the Institute for Research in Poverty at the University of Wisconsin. From 1974 to 1976 Popkin was a visiting associate professor with the Rockefeller Foundation in Manila, Philippines. He joined UNC-Chapel Hill's faculty in 1977 and became the W.R. Kenan Jr. Distinguished Professor of Nutrition there in 2011.

== Research ==
Popkin did extensive research from 1971 to the early 1980s on both hunger in America and around the world. He developed with Bob Evenson the Laguna Household Surveys and created the Bicol Multipurpose Survey while living in the Philippines and focused much of his attention there on women, work and the relationship of these activities to maternal and child health. He subsequently returned to the US and worked for a decade on maternal and child nutrition research, including initiating the Cebu Longitudinal Household Health and Nutrition Survey with two economics colleagues. He started the China Health and Nutrition Survey in the late 1980s and it was out of this experience that he wrote a series of papers which created the concept of the nutrition transition. Much of his subsequent research globally has been on the transitions in the way we eat, drink and move and how the most recent stage of this transition has created in regions and countries throughout the globe many shifted toward increased obesity and related noncommunicable diseases and many adverse economic consequences. For many years he was writing and talking about this transition and it took a Bellagio conference he held in 2001 to convince leading scholars globally that low and middle income countries were going through this rapid shift toward a pattern of diet and activity linked with rapid shifts toward obesity.

He also was the first author to identify along with lead co-author Colleen Doak the double burden of malnutrition in a series of papers first published in 2000. He also published papers linking obesity and stunting first and this led to many others studying both concepts.

He was a co-author on a widely cited 2004 paper in the American Journal of Clinical Nutrition which speculated that high fructose corn syrup-containing beverages may uniquely contribute to obesity.

In his research, he shows how increasing access to media and exposure to advertising, a powerful food industry, the rise of Wal-Mart like shopping centers, and a dramatic decline in physical activity are clashing with millions of years of human evolution, creating a world of overweight people with debilitating health problems such as diabetes. Ultimately, Popkin contends that widespread obesity is less a result of poor individual dietary choices than about a hi-tech, interconnected world in which governments and multinational corporations have extraordinary power to shape our everyday environments and subsequently how we eat, drink and move. Popkin also conducted the China Health and Nutrition Survey, and has conducted other surveys in countries such as Russia, Kyrgyzstan, and the United Arab Emirates.

He was a member of the G-7 small team of economists who worked in 1991 on working to help transform first the former Soviet Union and subsequently focused on the Russia economy. Then he helped to create a new poverty line for Russia (and later several other countries like Ukraine and Kyrgyzstan and also initiated the ongoing Russian Longitudinal Monitoring Survey. Popkin was the chair of a committee of experts that published a report on the health effects of food deserts in 2009. They found that farmer's markets and supermarkets did not have a noticeable effect in 'so-called' food deserts.

In the early 2010s he and colleagues led a project to determine the calorie and nutrient content of popular foods in the United States, or, as Popkin describes it, "mapping the food genome."

In 2014, Popkin et al. published a study in which the authors reported that fast food consumption was not the sole contributor to childhood obesity, and that Western diets in general might be more strongly associated with obesity than fast food consumption alone. Regarding this study, Popkin told the Winston-Salem Chronicle that "Eating fast foods is just one behavior that results from those poor eating habits. Just because children who eat more fast food are the most likely to become obese does not prove that calories from fast foods bear the brunt of the blame." Another 2014 study led by Popkin found that as a result of the Healthy Weight Commitment Foundation Pledge, food companies sold about 6.4 trillion fewer calories in 2012 than they did in 2007. But his team showed they were losing food markets to private labels and did not change their own behavior for what they produced.

More recently he worked with the Mexican government on a number of panels and commissions related to creating a healthier diet and preventing increased obesity and Diabetes. He also assisted Chilean colleagues working to create a set of healthy food policies in Chile. He then worked with Mexican colleagues to evaluate the Mexican sugar-sweetened beverage and nonessential food taxes to learn how they impact food purchasing patterns and ultimately diet and health.

He also worked with Chilean colleagues to evaluate their healthy food policies. Then his program expanded to wqrk first with other countries in Latin America and South Africa. And more recently to expand to other African and Asian countries.

His Global Food Research Program at UNC has been done in collaboration with Professors Shu Wen Ng and Lindsey Smith Taillie who in 2026 took over leadership of the Global Food Research Program. Initially when he led the program they worked with other countries [along with Mexico and Chile).  These included also research support for in-country research collaborators on policy advocacy. Those countries include Brazil, Colombia, South Africa, Jamaica and Barbados.  They also worked with South Africa in evaluating its tax on sugary beverages (the health promotion levy).

Popkin has received a large number of major honors for his scientific work.The list below is unique in that he received national and global awards for his research as well as his mentoring of 66 PhD students and his public service, The awards are isted below: 2026 David Kritchevsky Career Achievement Award 2025 International Union of Nutritional Sciences Living Legends Award 2025 2023 Dr Luis Bobadilla Award, National Institute of Public Health, Mexico 2022 Bat Sheva de Rothchild Fellowship, Israel National Academy of Sciences and Humanities 2020 Thomas A. Wadden Award for Distinguished Mentorship, The Obesity Society 2019 US National Forum Policy Award 2019 Thomas A. Wadden Award for Distinguished Mentorship , 2018 Atkinson-Stern Award for Distinguished Public Service, Obesity Society 2018 David Kritchevsky Memorial Lecture Award, American Heart Association Council on Lifestyle and Cardiometabolic Health 2016 Population Science and Public Health Global Award, World Obesity Federation 2015 Chinese Nutrition Society’s first award for significant foreign contributions to Chinese nutrition 2015 Conrad Elvehjem Award for Public Service in Nutrition, American Society for Nutrition 2011 Gopalan Oration Award, Nutrition Society of India (the top nutrition prize of India) 2011 Friends of Albert (Mickey) Stunkard Lifetime Achievement Award, Obesity Society 2010 Elected fellow of the Obesity Society 2010 United Kingdom Rank Prize for Science 2010 Elected fellow of the American Society for Nutritional Sciences 2009 E. V. McCollum International Award Lecture, American Society for Nutrition 1998 Kellogg Prize, Society for International Nutrition Research, for outstanding international nutrition 1992 Bernard G. Greenberg Alumni Endowment Award, University of North Carolina School 1965 Woodrow Wilson Foundation Fellow 1965 Wisconsin King Christian IV Award for Civil Rights contribution

=== Nutrition transition ===
The concept of nutrition transition, referring to the changes in diet in the Western world from high-fiber diets to those based on more processed foods containing more fat and sugar, was first proposed by Popkin in 1993. Since he proposed the concept, Popkin has published studies about the nutrition transition and its effects in the developing world, as well as in Brazil.

== Views ==
In 2013, Popkin argued that smoothies are "the new danger" due to the large quantities of fructose they contain. He is also a critic of the soft drink industry. He has expressed strong support for soda taxes, and has compared them to existing taxes on tobacco. When several large beverage companies promised to reduce soda consumption in 2014, Popkin said this was merely an attempt to pass off already declining soda sales as an effort to combat obesity. In the past decade after he organized a bellagio conference on large-scale regulatory and fiscal options for addressing global obesity much of his energy has been working on regulatory options such as food labeling and marketing control in many countries (e.g. in Chile), fiscal actions around SSBs (sugar-sweetened beverages) and other ultra-processed food taxes (e.g. in Mexico), and consulting with dozens of countries on such actions.

== The World is Fat ==
In 2009, Popkin's book The World is Fat was published by Avery Publishing. In the book, Popkin contends that the rising rates of obesity around the world are due to several different factors, including globalization, technology, and the fact that people now eat more often and in more places than they did before. He also cites the fact that humans have a tendency to enjoy eating foods containing large amounts of sugar and fat as another contributor to the obesity epidemic.

The book was described by Fuchsia Dunlop as "a concise, lucid overview of how the human diet has gone awry in the last half-century."

== Personal life ==
Popkin was a partner of Anne-Linda Furstenberg, a professor of social work at UNC-Chapel Hill for 16 years, until she died in 2002. With a previous wife he had a son. He is currently a partner of Cay Stratton, formerly advisor to the UK government on youth and young adult employment and later a senior fellow at MDC, a nonprofit focusing on southern poverty issues.
