= American Beverage Association =

American beverage industry lobby organization

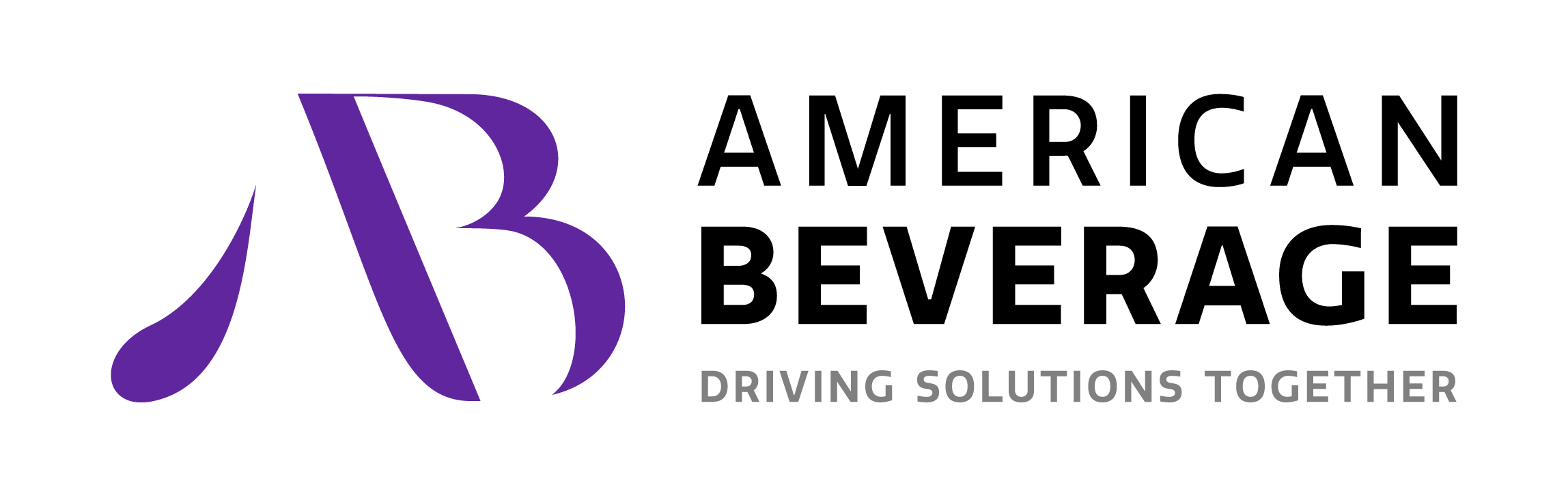
- Trade name: ABA
- Type: Trade Association (501(c)(6))
- Industry: Non-Alcoholic Beverage Industry
- Predecessor: American Bottlers of Carbonated Beverages; National Soft Drink Association
- Founded: 1919
- Headquarters: United States
- Key people: Matthew Dent, Chair
- Services: Lobbying on behalf of non-alcoholic beverage producers
- Website: www.americanbeverage.org

The American Beverage Association (ABA) is a government lobbying group that represents the beverage industry in the United States. Its members include producers and bottlers of soft drinks, such as The Coca-Cola Company, PepsiCo, and Keurig Dr Pepper, along with other non-alcoholic beverages.

== History ==
The organization was founded in 1919, and originally named the American Bottlers of Carbonated Beverages. In 1966, it renamed itself the National Soft Drink Association. Then in November 2004, it changed to its current name, "to better reflect the expanded range of nonalcoholic beverages the industry produces."

== Leadership ==
Its members are bottling companies and other beverage industry firms, including Bulldog Americas Corporation, several Coca-Cola and Pepsi-Cola bottlers, Pepsi-Americas Inc, and Royal Crown Bottling Corporation.

== Lobbying ==
The American Beverage Association's lobbying efforts have recently skyrocketed, largely to finance the industry's opposition to legislators’ considering increased taxes on soft drinks given their impact on Americans' health. The Association has annually spent from $391,000 to more than $690,000 annually on lobbying from 2003 to 2008. In the 2010 election cycle, its lobbying grew more than 1000 percent to $8.67 million. These funds are helping to pay for 25 lobbyists at seven different lobbying firms.

== School beverage policy ==
In May 2006, Coca-Cola, PepsiCo, and Cadbury Schweppes agreed to begin removing sugary drinks from schools. These companies had more than 90 percent of overall school drink sales. The agreement contained the rule that elementary schools could only sell water, low-fat or nonfat milk, and 100 percent juice. American Beverage Association president Susan Neely said this agreement was voluntary, but The New York Times reported that the companies acted because of the threat of lawsuits and state legislation.

== Latest news ==
In September 2009, a New England Journal of Medicine study called for taxes on sugar-sweetened beverages saying that these actions would cut rates of diet-related diseases and health care costs. Written by experts in nutrition, public health and economics, the study called for an excise tax of a penny per ounce on soft drinks and other beverages that have added sweeteners such as sucrose, high fructose corn syrup or fruit-juice concentrates. The expectation is that such a tax could reduce calorie consumption from sweetened beverages by 10% and create revenue that governments could use to pay for health programs. A report on the New England Journal of Medicine study can be read here

To counter these pro-tax efforts, the American Beverage Association and other beverage industry companies have established an "Americans Against Food Taxes" coalition and website. Their efforts include national advertising and other actions positioning the proposed taxes as "taxing hard-working families." This group's actions have been opposed by pro-tax organizations including the Center for Science in the Public Interest.

To date, 33 states have taxes on soft drinks but they are "too low to affect consumption and the revenues are not earmarked for health programs," according to the New England Journal of Medicine study.
