= Sugar Association =

American sugar industry trade association

Coordinates: 38°54′12.5″N 77°1′49.5″W

The Sugar Association
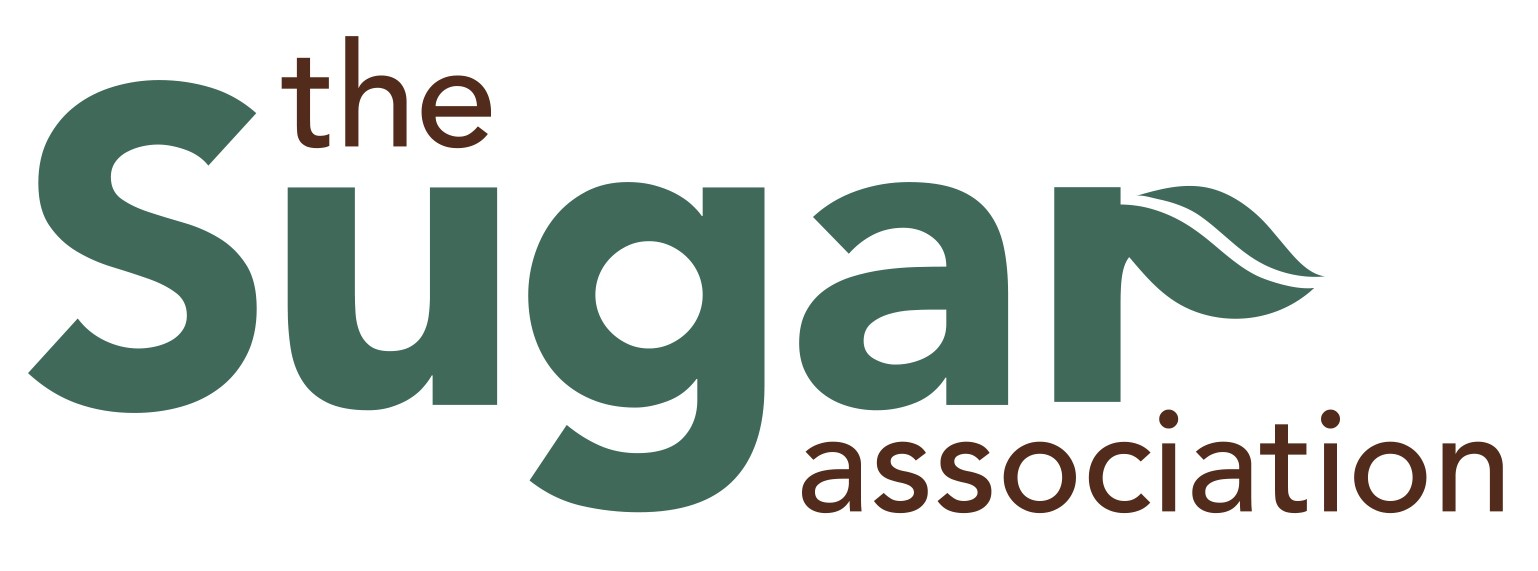
- [[File:;][.d|frameless|upright=1]]
- Trade name: SAI
- Company type: Trade Association
- Industry: Sugar Industry
- Predecessor: Sugar Research Foundation
- Founded: 1943
- Headquarters: United States
- Key people: Peter O'Malley, Chair; John McCreedy, Vice-Chair; Courtney Gaine, President
- Services: Research on behalf of sugar producers Create educational resources Public education
- Website: www.sugar.org

The Sugar Association is a trade association for the sugar industry of the United States. Its members include nearly 142,000 growers, processors and refiners of sugar beet and sugarcane plants.

== History ==
The Sugar Association, founded by members of the U.S. sugar industry, began in 1943 as the Sugar Research Foundation. In 1947, the association assumed its current name.

Initially, the association had two main focuses: public education and scientific research. In 1968, The Sugar Research Foundation became the World Sugar Research Organisation, Ltd. (WSRO). Both the Sugar Association and WSRO are still active today.

Today the organization describes itself as "the scientific voice of the sugar industry" on their website and social media pages.

== Leadership ==
The association's leaders include: Chair Peter O'Malley, Vice President of Corporate Relations at American Sugar Refining, Inc; Vice Chair John McCreedy, Executive Vice President at The Amalgamated Sugar Company LLC; and President Courtney Gaine, president of the Sugar Association. Its members are sugar companies and other sugar industry firms, including American Sugar Cane League, ASR Group, Imperial Sugar, and The Western Sugar Cooperative.

== Industry funding of research ==
The sugar industry has funded research that downplayed the health effects of sugar. The Coca-Cola Company provided funding to the Global Energy Balance Network promoting exercise over reduced sugar consumption. The Sugar Research Foundation, the predecessor to the Sugar Association, funded research that downplayed the risks of sugar and highlighted the hazards of fat.

== Research ==
The association funds research on the topics of sugar and nutrition, including:

- Bakke, Alyssa J.; Stubbs, Cody A.; McDowell, Elliott H.; Moding, Kameron J.; Johnson, Susan L.; Hayes, John E. (July 2018). "Mary Poppins was right: Adding small amounts of sugar or salt reduces the bitterness of vegetables". Appetite. 126: 90–101. doi:10.1016/j.appet.2018.03.015. PMID 29605517. S2CID 4975684.
- Bailey, Regan; Fulgoni, Victor; Cowan, Alexandra; Gaine, P. (17 January 2018). "Sources of Added Sugars in Young Children, Adolescents, and Adults with Low and High Intakes of Added Sugars". Nutrients. 10 (1): 102. doi:10.3390/nu10010102. PMC 5793330. PMID 29342109.
- Achterberg, Cheryl (March 2017). "A Perspective: Toddler Feeding, Science, and Nutrition Policy". Nutrition Today. 52 (2): S6–S13. doi:10.1097/NT.0000000000000199. S2CID 79463035.
- Palmer, Carole A. (March 2017). "Oral and Dental Health Considerations in Feeding Toddlers". Nutrition Today. 52 (2): S69–S75. doi:10.1097/NT.0000000000000194. S2CID 78228540.
- Hayes, John E.; Johnson, Susan L. (March 2017). "Sensory Aspects of Bitter and Sweet Tastes During Early Childhood". Nutrition Today. 52 (2): S41–S51. doi:10.1097/NT.0000000000000201.

== Criticism ==
The association gained broader public attention in 2016 for nutrition research that its Research Foundation executive, John Hickson, had commissioned in the mid-1960s. Three Harvard University scientists including D. Mark Hegsted, later a USDA official, and Frederick J. Stare, the chairman of the university's nutrition department, were paid an undisclosed $6,500 (nearly $50,000 in 2016 equivalent dollars) to produce a review of industry-selected research. The resulting paper in the New England Journal of Medicine "minimized the link between sugar and heart health and cast aspersions on the role of saturated fat [by saying fat was primarily causing heart problems]". The paper helped to shape nutrition guidance for decades away from even considering the dangers to the heart of sugar and its role in obesity in the human diet. In September, 2016, a study of this history, reviewing thousands of pages of documents from archives at Harvard, the University of Illinois and other libraries, was published by C.E. Kearns, L.A. Schmidt and Stanton Glantz, (Glantz a professor of medicine at UCSF), in JAMA Internal Medicine. The sugar industry was "able to derail the discussion about sugar for decades," Glantz was quoted as saying in The New York Times. Marion Nestle, a professor of nutrition, food studies and public health at New York University, wrote separately in support of the 2016 JAMA article that there was "compelling evidence" that the sugar industry initiated research "expressly to exonerate sugar as a major risk factor for coronary heart disease." The Sugar Association responded to the 2016 JAMA publications saying standards of disclosure and conflict of interest were non-existent or less stringent in the 1960s and that "most concerning is the growing use of headline-baiting articles to trump quality scientific research .... We're disappointed to see a journal of JAMA's stature being drawn into this trend." The New England Journal of Medicine began to require financial disclosures in 1984.

Other research efforts by major dietary-sugar corporate interests, particularly soft drinks and candy, have often found "no link between sugary drinks and weight gain" according to a 2015 report in the New York Times. This earlier New York Times report also noted that "a review of beverage studies, published in the journal PLOS Medicine, found that those funded by Coca-Cola, PepsiCo, the American Beverage Association and the sugar industry were five times more likely to find no link between sugary drinks and weight gain than studies whose authors reported no financial conflicts."

According to a 2025 Business Insider piece, the Tobacco industry playbook originated with staff and strategies from the Sugar Research Foundation.
