= Corn Refiners Association =

American trade association

Corn Refiners Association Inc
- Formation: Tax-exempt since May 1983; 43 years ago
- Type: 501(c)(6)
- Headquarters: Washington, DC
- President & CEO: John Bode
- Revenue: 7,640,658 USD (2023)
- Expenses: 7,804,378 USD (2023)
- Website: corn.org

The Corn Refiners Association (CRA) is a trade association based in Washington, D.C. It represents the corn refining industry in the United States. Corn refining encompasses the production of corn starch, corn oil, and high-fructose corn syrup (HFCS).

== Issues ==
=== Antitrust law ===
The CRA opposed the merger of the Union Pacific and Southern Pacific railroads on the grounds it would reduce competition and raise shipping prices.

=== Biofuels ===
In 2004, the CRA worked with the University of Illinois and the Agricultural Research Service to create computer models of ethanol production costs.

=== Biotech ===
In 2019, the United States Department of Agriculture (USDA) proposed rules that would streamline the regulation of biotech crops including those that are genetically engineered. The rules would exempt such crops from regulation if the changes they introduce could have been made through traditional breeding methods. The proposed rules would give biotech firms three options: self-declaring their products as exempt, seeking an exemption letter from the UDSA, or asking the USDA to determine if the traits in question should be exempted or regulated. The CRA, along with other industry groups, strongly opposed this rule change on the grounds that trade and consumer confidence in agricultural products could be compromised.

=== High fructose corn syrup ===
The CRA launched a public relations campaign in 2008 called "Changing the Conversation about High Fructose Corn Syrup" (HFCS). Initial commercials stated that HFCS was "natural". Later ads stated HFCS is "made from corn ... and is okay to eat in moderation". In response to the claims HFCS is "natural", Michael Jacobson, executive director of the Center for Science in the Public Interest stated HFCS "is chemically or enzymatically degraded to glucose ... High-fructose corn syrup just doesn't exist in nature." The claim that HFCS is safe in moderation has also been criticized, as HFCS is used in tens of thousands of products in America. Lisa McLaughlin from Time responded by saying "unless you're making a concerted effort to avoid it, it's pretty difficult to consume high-fructose corn syrup in moderation."

In September 2010, the CRA applied for permission to use the name "corn sugar" in place of high fructose corn syrup on food labels for products sold in the United States. Time stated that the CRA's decision to change the name of HFCS was because HFCS had such a bad reputation. In response to the proposed name change, The New York Times ran an article asking nutrition experts what they would suggest as appropriate names for HFCS. Three of the five experts recommended alternate names, including Michael Pollan who suggested "enzymatically altered corn glucose". Dr Andrew Weil recommended not changing from HFCS, calling the term corn sugar "too vague" and the CRA's attempt to change HFCS's name "Orwellian". However Dr. Barry Popkin felt that "corn sugar" was an appropriate term. In May 2012, the Food and Drug Administration rejected the name change.

In 2010, the CRA approached bloggers who run mom blogs, through the organization MomCentral.com. Bloggers were extended offers of $50 Wal-Mart gift certificates in exchange for writing about a CRA sponsored seminar that made the claims that high fructose corn syrup is safe and healthy. Several prominent bloggers criticized the CRA's methods as well as the bloggers who passed on the information presented by CRA.

=== Trade ===
In 1991, the Netherlands implemented trade barriers that affected American corn growers and refiners such as implementing a maximum allowable content for fat and starch that would have effectively ended the duty-free status of corn-based gluten meal by reclassifying most of it as animal feed. The tariffs would have been roughly $100-to-$175 per metric ton. The CRA opposed these trade restrictions. A compromise trade deal was reached in 1992.

The CRA has expressed strong support for the United States–Mexico–Canada Agreement (USMCA) free trade deal. The CRA and other trade groups sponsored the Farmers for Free Trade Motorcade for Trade. The motorcade traveled extensively through rural areas of the United States to promote approval of the USMCA. The motorcade was intended to raise awareness of the link between free trade and farm income and influence members of Congress, especially freshman lawmakers elected in 2018.

In the late 1990s, Mexico erected trade barriers on corn-based sweeteners made in the United States and then implemented a 20% tax on soft drinks not flavored with Mexican sugar in 2002. This ignited a decade long dispute. The World Trade Organization eventually ruled that the soft-drink tax was illegal. Mexico and the United States reached an agreement to phase them out starting in October 2006 and ending in zero tariffs in 2008.

The CRA expressed support for the preliminary trade deal reached between the United States and China in December 2019.

== Leadership ==
As of 2020, the president and CEO of CRA was John Bode.

== Members ==
Members of the CRA include Archer Daniels Midland, Cargill, Ingredion, Roquette America, Inc. and Tate & Lyle Ingredients Americas.
