= Ford Motor Company =

American multinational automobile manufacturer

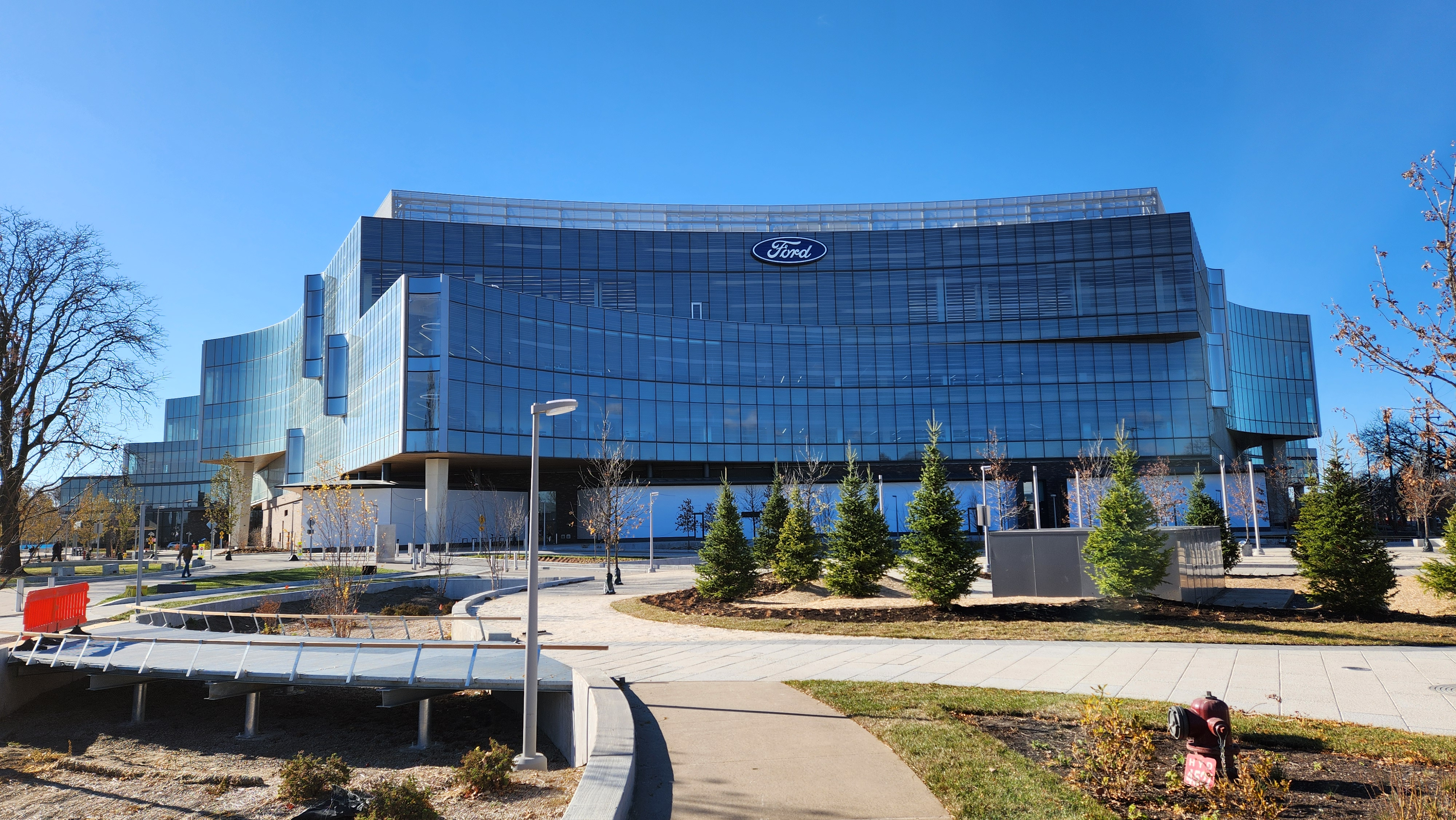
- Headquarters in Dearborn, Michigan
- Type: Public
- Traded as: NYSE: F; S&P 500 component
- Industry: Automotive
- Predecessor: Henry Ford Company
- Founded: June 16, 1903; 123 years ago in Detroit, Michigan, US
- Founder: Henry Ford
- Headquarters: Ford World Headquarters, Dearborn, Michigan, US
- Area served: Worldwide
- Key people: William Clay Ford Jr. (executive chairman); Jim Farley (president & CEO)
- Products: Automobiles; Performance vehicles; Luxury vehicles; Commercial vehicles; Automotive parts
- Production output: ▼4.40 million vehicles (2025)
- Brands: Ford; Lincoln; Motorcraft
- Services: Automotive finance; Vehicle leasing; Vehicle service
- Revenue: ▲US$187.26 billion (2025)
- Operating income: ▼US$−9.169 billion (2025)
- Net income: ▼US$−8.162 billion (2025)
- Total assets: ▲US$289.16 billion (2025)
- Total equity: ▼US$35.98 billion (2025)
- Owner: Ford family (2% equity; 40% voting power)
- Number of employees: 169,000 (2025)
- Divisions: Ford Blue; Ford Model E; Ford Pro; Ford Racing
- Subsidiaries: List: International; Ford Argentina; Ford Australia; Ford Brazil; Ford Canada; Ford Europe; Britain; France; Germany; Ireland; Italy; Otosan (41%); Romania; Spain; TrustFord; Ford India; Ford New Zealand; Ford Philippines; Ford Southern Africa; Ford Vietnam (75%); Ford Lio Ho (70%); AutoAlliance Thailand (50%); Changan Ford (35%); Jiangling Motors (32%) Finance; Ford Credit Other; BlueOval SK; Ford Drive; Ford Next; Latitude AI
- Website: ford.com

The Ford Motor Company (commonly known as Ford, sometimes abbreviated as FoMoCo) is an American multinational automobile manufacturer headquartered in Dearborn, Michigan, United States. It was founded by Henry Ford and incorporated on June 16, 1903. The company sells automobiles and commercial vehicles under the Ford brand, and luxury cars under its Lincoln brand. The company is listed on the New York Stock Exchange under the single-letter ticker symbol F and is controlled by the Ford family. They have minority ownership but a plurality of the voting power.

Ford introduced methods for large-scale manufacturing of cars and large-scale management of an industrial workforce using elaborately engineered manufacturing sequences typified by moving assembly lines. By 1914, these methods were known around the world as Fordism. Ford's former British subsidiaries Jaguar and Land Rover, acquired in 1989 and 2000, respectively, were sold to the Indian automaker Tata Motors in March 2008. Ford owned the Swedish automaker Volvo from 1999 to 2010. In the third quarter of 2010, Ford discontinued the Mercury brand, under which it had marketed middle priced cars in the United States, Canada, Mexico, and the Middle East since 1938.

Ford is the second-largest American-based automaker, behind General Motors, and the sixth-largest in the world, behind Toyota, Volkswagen Group, Hyundai Motor Group, Stellantis, and General Motors, based on 2022 vehicle production. The company went public in 1956 but the Ford family, through special Class B shares, retain 40 percent of the voting rights. During the 2008–2010 automotive industry crisis, the company struggled financially but did not have to be rescued by the federal government, unlike the other two major US automakers. Ford Motors has since returned to profitability, and was the eleventh-ranked overall American-based company in the 2018 Fortune 500 list, based on global revenues in 2017 of $156.7 billion. In 2023, Ford produced 4.4 million automobiles, and employed about 177,000 employees worldwide. The company operates joint ventures in China (Changan Ford and Jiangling Ford), Taiwan (Ford Lio Ho), Thailand (AutoAlliance Thailand), and Turkey (Ford Otosan). Ford owns a 32% stake in China's Jiangling Motors.

== History ==
=== 20th century ===
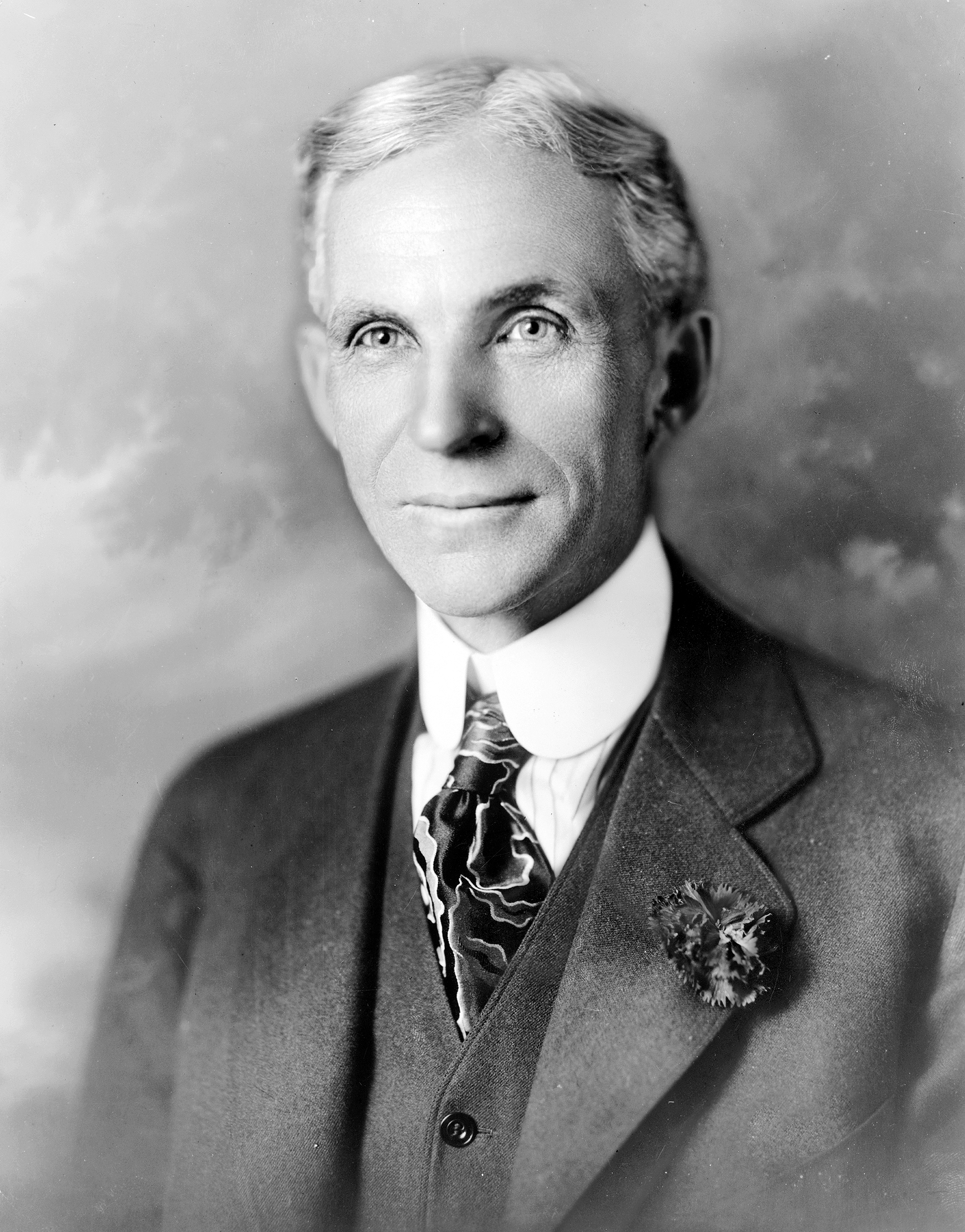
Founder Henry Ford, 1919

The Henry Ford Company was Henry Ford's first attempt at a car manufacturing company and was established on November 3, 1901. This became the Cadillac Motor Company on August 22, 1902, after Ford left with the rights to his name. In 1903, the Ford Motor Company was launched in a converted factory, with $28,000, equivalent to $1,003,000 in 2025, in cash from twelve investors, most notably John and Horace Dodge, who later founded the Dodge Brothers Motor Vehicle Company.

The first president was not Ford, but local banker John S. Gray, who was chosen in order to assuage investors' fears that Ford would leave the new company the way he had left its predecessor. During its early years, the company produced just a few cars a day at its factory on Mack Avenue and later at its factory on Piquette Avenue in Detroit, Michigan. Groups of two or three men worked on each car, assembling it from parts made mostly by supplier companies contracting for Ford. Within a decade the company led the world in the expansion and refinement of the assembly line concept, and Ford soon brought much of the part production in-house, via vertical integration.

Henry Ford was 39 years old when he founded the Ford Motor Company, which became one of the world's largest and most profitable companies. It has been in continuous family control for over 100 years, and is one of the largest family-controlled companies in the world.

The first gasoline-powered automobile was created in 1885 by the German inventor Karl Benz, with his Benz Patent-Motorwagen. More efficient production methods were needed to make automobiles affordable for middle class people; Ford contributed to this effort through a variety of innovations, including the introduction of the first moving assembly line in 1913 at the Ford factory in Highland Park.

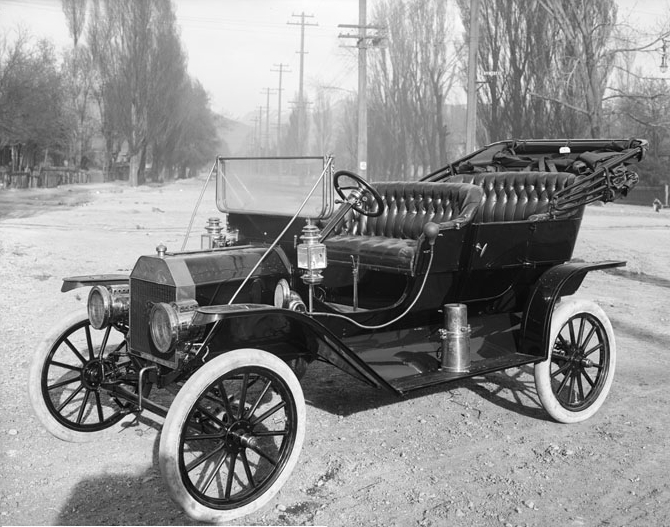
A 1910 Model T, introduced in 1908, photographed in Salt Lake City

Between 1903 and 1908, Ford produced the Models A, B, C, F, K, N, R, and S. Hundreds or a few thousand of most of these were sold per year. In 1908, Ford introduced the mass-produced Model T, which totaled millions sold over nearly 20 years. In 1927, Ford replaced the T with the Model A, the first production car with laminated safety glass in the windshield. Ford launched the first low-priced car with a V8 engine in 1932.

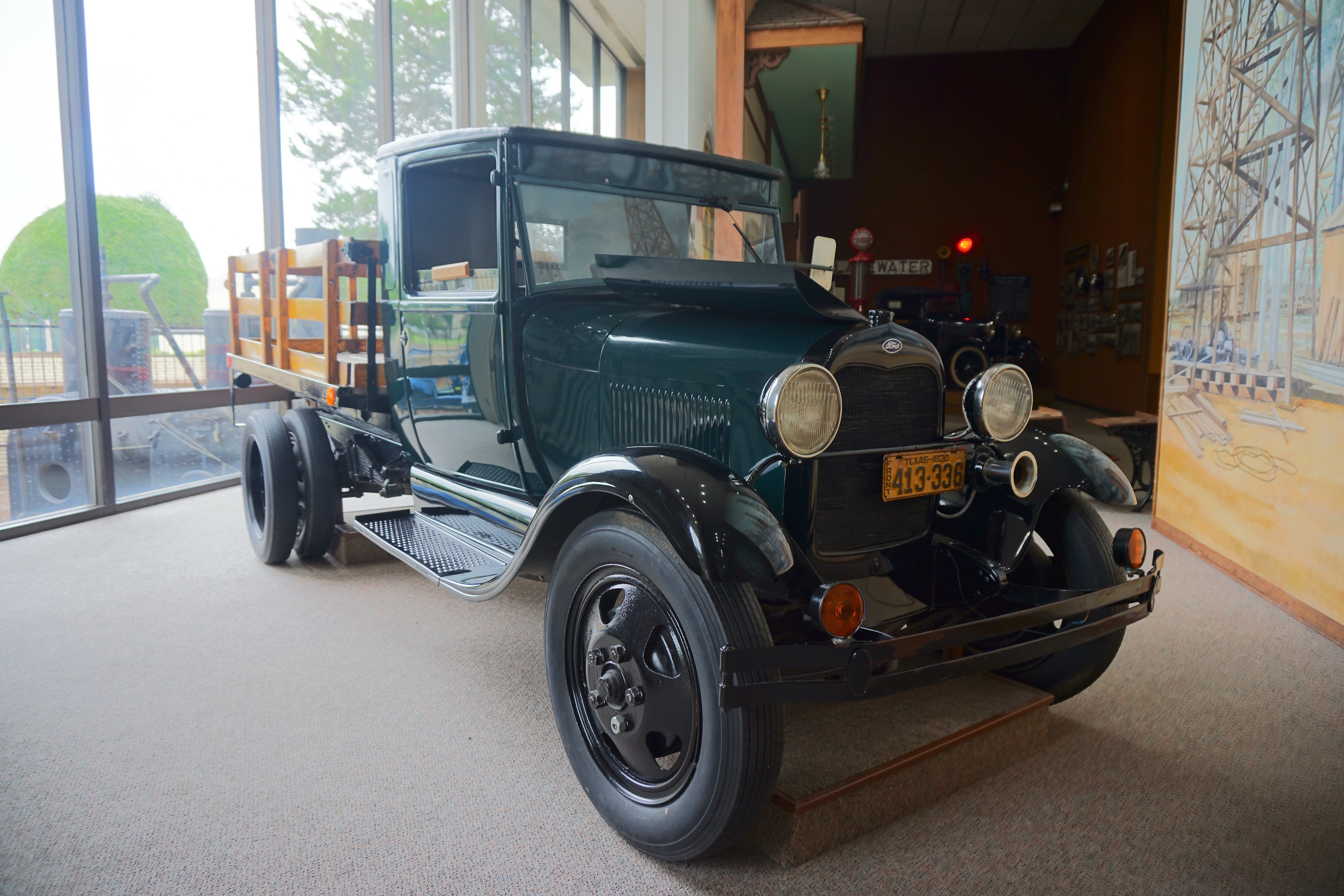
Ford Model AA truck (based on the Model A) displayed in Kilgore, Texas

In an attempt to compete with General Motors' mid-priced Pontiac, Oldsmobile, and Buick, Ford created the Mercury in 1939 as a higher-priced companion car to Ford. Henry Ford purchased the Lincoln Motor Company in 1922, in order to compete with such brands as Cadillac and Packard for the luxury segment of the automobile market.

In 1929, Ford was contracted by the government of the Soviet Union to set up the Gorky Automobile Plant in Russia initially producing Ford Model A and AAs, thereby playing an important role in the industrialization of that country and consequently the Soviet war effort during World War II. To that end, in 1944, Stalin wrote a letter to the U.S. Chamber of Commerce stating that Henry Ford was "one of the world's greatest industrialists".

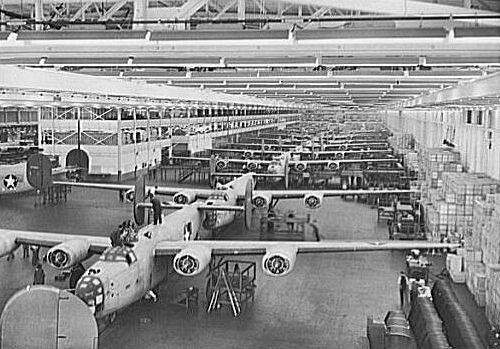
B-24 Liberator bombers being mass-produced at Ford's Willow Run assembly plant, 1944

During World War II, the United States Department of War picked Ford to mass-produce the Consolidated B-24 Liberator bomber at its Willow Run assembly plant. Ford Werke and Ford SAF, Ford's subsidiaries in Germany and France, respectively, produced military vehicles and other equipment for Nazi Germany's war effort. Some of Ford's operations in Germany at the time were run using forced labor.

The creation of a scientific laboratory in Dearborn, Michigan, in 1951, doing unfettered basic research, led to Ford's involvement in superconductivity research. In 1964, Ford Research Labs made a key breakthrough with the invention of a superconducting quantum interference device or SQUID.

Ford offered the Lifeguard safety package from 1956, which included such innovations as a standard deep-dish steering wheel, optional front, and, for the first time in a car, rear seatbelts, and an optional padded dash. Ford introduced child-proof door locks into its products in 1957, and, in the same year, offered the first retractable hardtop on a mass-produced six-seater car.

In late 1955, Ford established the Continental division as a separate luxury car division. This division was responsible for the manufacture and sale of the famous Continental Mark II. At the same time, the Edsel division was created to design and market that car starting with the 1958 model year. Due to limited sales of the Continental and the Edsel disaster, Ford merged Mercury, Edsel, and Lincoln into "M-E-L", which reverted to "Lincoln-Mercury" after Edsel's November 1959 demise.

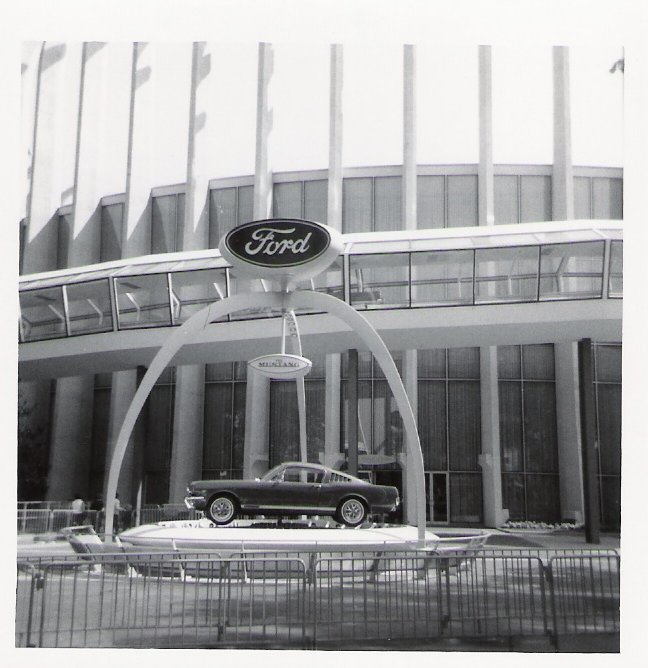
The introduction of the Ford Mustang at the 1964 New York World's Fair.

The Ford Mustang was introduced on April 17, 1964, during the 1964 New York World's Fair, where Ford had a pavilion made by The Walt Disney Company. In 1965, Ford introduced the seat belt reminder light.

With the 1980s, Ford introduced several highly successful vehicles around the world. During the 1980s, Ford began using the advertising slogan, "Have you driven a Ford, lately?" to introduce new customers to its brand and make its vehicles appear more modern. In 1990 and 1994, respectively, Ford also acquired Jaguar Cars and Aston Martin. During the mid-to-late 1990s, Ford continued to sell large numbers of vehicles, in a booming American economy with a soaring stock market and low fuel prices.

With the dawn of the new century, legacy health care costs, higher fuel prices, and a faltering economy led to falling market shares, declining sales, and diminished profit margins. Most of the corporate profits came from financing consumer automobile loans through Ford Motor Credit Company.

=== 21st century ===
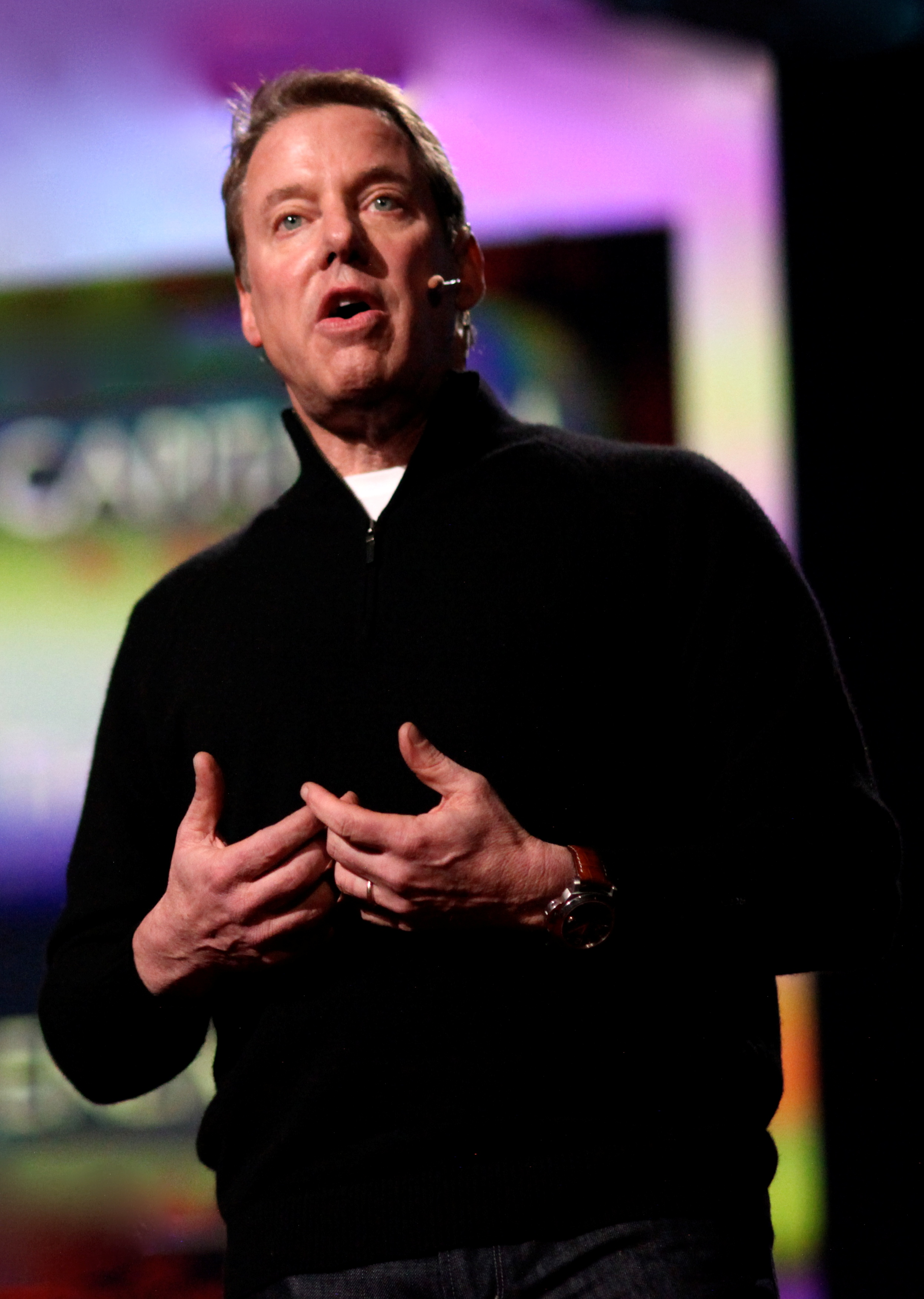
William Clay Ford Jr., great-grandson of Henry Ford, serves as the executive chairman at the board of Ford Motor Company

William Clay Ford Jr., the great-grandson of Henry Ford (better known as "Bill"), was appointed executive chairman in 1998, and also became chief executive officer of the company in 2001, with the departure of Jacques Nasser, becoming the first member of the Ford family to head the company since the retirement of his uncle, Henry Ford II, in 1982. Ford sold motorsport engineering company Cosworth to Gerald Forsythe and Kevin Kalkhoven in 2004, the start of a decrease in Ford's motorsport involvement. Upon the retirement of president and chief operations officer Jim Padilla in April 2006, Bill Ford assumed his roles as well. Five months later, in September, Ford named Alan Mulally as president and CEO, with Ford continuing as executive chairman.

By 2005, both Ford and GM's corporate bonds had been downgraded to junk status as a result of high U.S. health care costs for an aging workforce, soaring gasoline prices, eroding market share, and an overdependence on declining SUV sales. Profit margins decreased on large vehicles due to increased "incentives" (in the form of rebates or low-interest financing) to offset declining demand. In the latter half of 2005, Chairman Bill Ford asked newly appointed Ford Americas Division President Mark Fields to develop a plan to return the company to profitability. Fields previewed the plan, named The Way Forward, at the board meeting of the company on December 7, 2005, and it was unveiled to the public on January 23, 2006. "The Way Forward" included resizing the company to match market realities, dropping some unprofitable and inefficient models, consolidating production lines, closing 14 factories and cutting 30,000 jobs.

Ford moved to introduce a range of new vehicles, including "Crossover SUVs" built on unibody car platforms, rather than more body-on-frame chassis. In developing the hybrid electric powertrain technologies for the Ford Escape Hybrid SUV, the company licensed similar Toyota hybrid technologies in order to avoid patent infringements. Ford announced that it would team up with electricity supply company Southern California Edison (SCE) to examine the future of plug-in hybrids in terms of how home and vehicle energy systems will work with the electrical grid. Under the multimillion-dollar, multi-year project, Ford is to convert a demonstration fleet of Ford Escape Hybrids into plug-in hybrids, and SCE is to evaluate how the vehicles might interact with the home and the utility's electrical grid. Some of the vehicles are to be evaluated "in typical customer settings", according to Ford.

In December 2006, the company raised its borrowing capacity to about $25 billion, placing substantially all corporate assets as collateral. Chairman Bill Ford has stated that "bankruptcy is not an option". Ford and the United Auto Workers, representing approximately 46,000 hourly workers in North America, agreed to a historic contract settlement in November 2007 giving the company a substantial break in terms of its ongoing retiree health care costs and other economic issues. The agreement included the establishment of a company-funded, independently run Voluntary Employee Beneficiary Association (VEBA) trust to shift the burden of retiree health care from the company's books, thereby improving its balance sheet. This arrangement took effect on January 1, 2010. As a sign of its currently strong cash position, Ford contributed its entire current liability (estimated at US$5.5 billion as of December 31, 2009) to the VEBA in cash, and also pre-paid US$500 million of its future liabilities to the fund. The agreement also gave hourly workers the job security they were seeking by having the company commit to substantial investments in most of its factories.

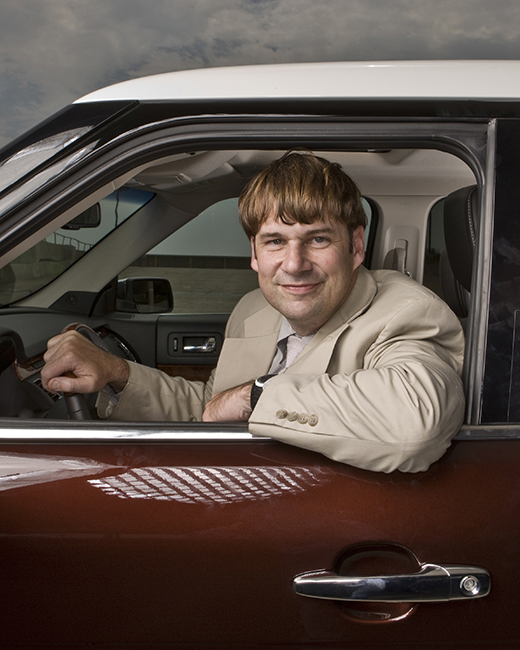
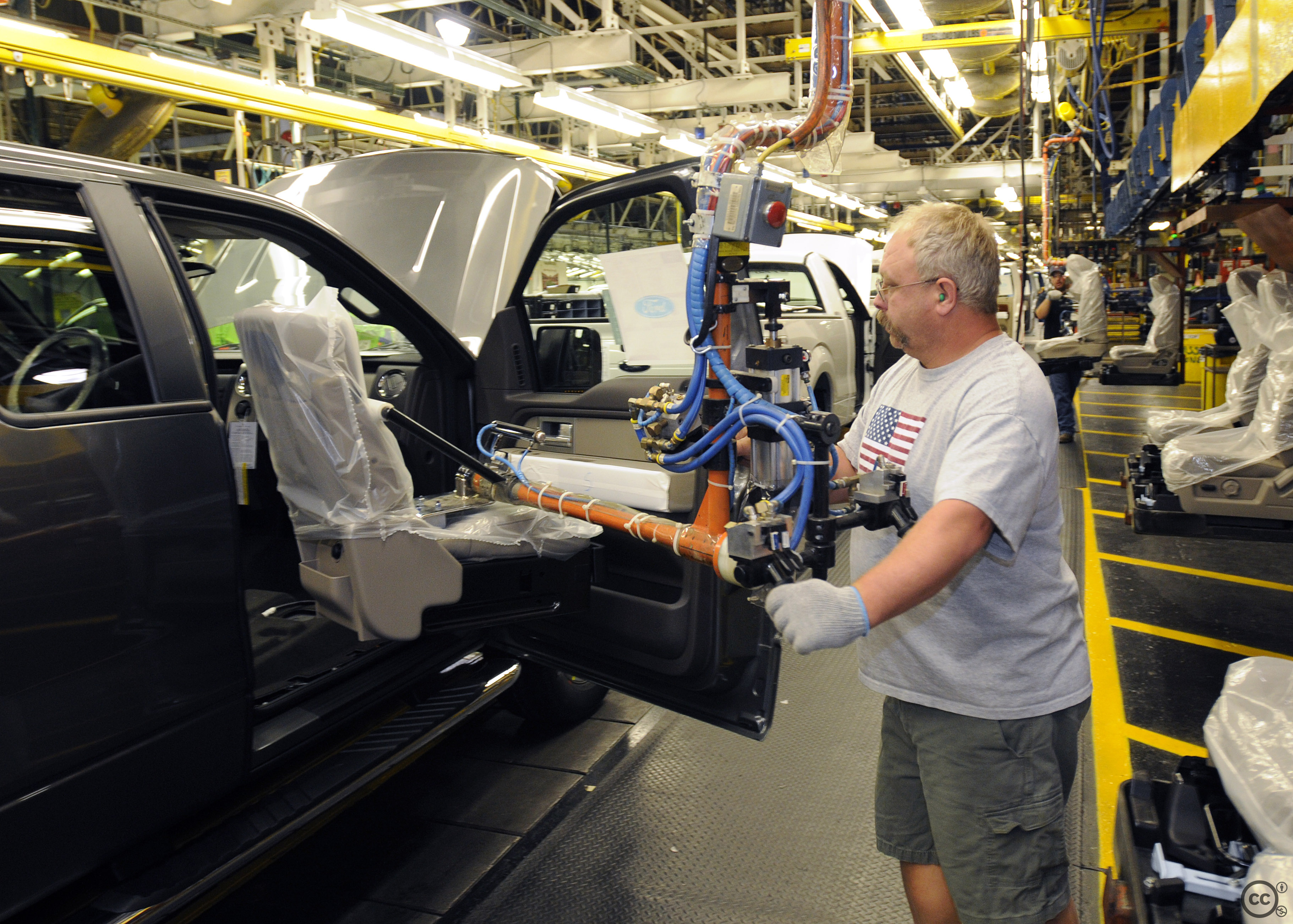
Two images of 2008, (left): Ford president & CEO Jim Farley; (right): A worker installs a seat into a Ford F-150 at the Ford Kansas City Assembly Plant in 2008 which was a critical time for the automaker due to the 2008–2010 automotive industry crisis

The automaker reported the largest annual loss in company history in 2006 of $12.7 billion, and estimated that it would not return to profitability until 2009. However, Ford surprised Wall Street in the second quarter of 2007 by posting a $750 million profit. Despite the gains, the company finished the year with a $2.7 billion loss, largely attributed to finance restructuring at Volvo. On June 2, 2008, Ford sold its Jaguar and Land Rover operations to Tata Motors for $2.3 billion.

During congressional hearings held in November 2008 at Washington D.C., Ford's Alan Mulally stated that "We at Ford are hopeful that we have enough liquidity. But we also must prepare ourselves for the prospect of further deteriorating economic conditions". He went on to state that "The collapse of one of our competitors would have a severe impact on Ford" and that Ford Motor Company supported both Chrysler and General Motors in their search for government bridge loans during the 2008–2010 automotive industry crisis. Together, the three companies presented action plans for the sustainability of the industry. Mulally stated that "In addition to our plan, we are also here today to request support for the industry. In the near-term, Ford does not require access to a government bridge loan. However, we request a credit line of $9 billion as a critical backstop or safeguard against worsening conditions as we drive transformational change in our company". GM and Chrysler received government loans and financing through T.A.R.P. legislation funding provisions.

On December 19, the cost of credit default swaps to insure the debt of Ford was 68 percent of the sum insured for five years, in addition to annual payments of 5 percent. That meant $6.8 million paid upfront to insure $10 million in debt, in addition to payments of $500,000 per year. In January 2009, Ford reported a $14.6 billion loss in the preceding year, a record for the company. The company retained sufficient liquidity to fund its operations. Through April 2009, Ford's strategy of debt-for-equity exchanges erased $9.9 billion in liabilities (28% of its total) in order to leverage its cash position. These actions yielded Ford a $2.7 billion profit in fiscal year 2009, the company's first full-year profit in four years. In 2012, Ford's corporate bonds were upgraded from junk to investment grade again, citing sustainable, lasting improvements.

On October 29, 2012, Ford announced the sale of its climate control components business, its last remaining automotive components operation, to Detroit Thermal Systems LLC for an undisclosed price. On November 1, 2012, Ford announced that CEO Alan Mulally would stay with the company until 2014. Ford also named Mark Fields, its president of operations in the Americas, as its new chief operating officer Mulally was paid a compensation of over $174 million in his previous seven years at Ford since 2006. The generous amount has been a sore point for some workers of the company.

In April 2016, Ford announced a plan to modernize its Dearborn engineering and headquarters campuses through a ten-year building project. The result would see the number of Ford employees working in these areas doubling, to 24,000. During construction, some 2000 of the employees were relocated out of the campus to a temporary location in a disused section of the local shopping mall. Facilities would also be altered to allow ride-sharing and electric and self-driving vehicles. Estimates of the construction cost were $1.2 billion.

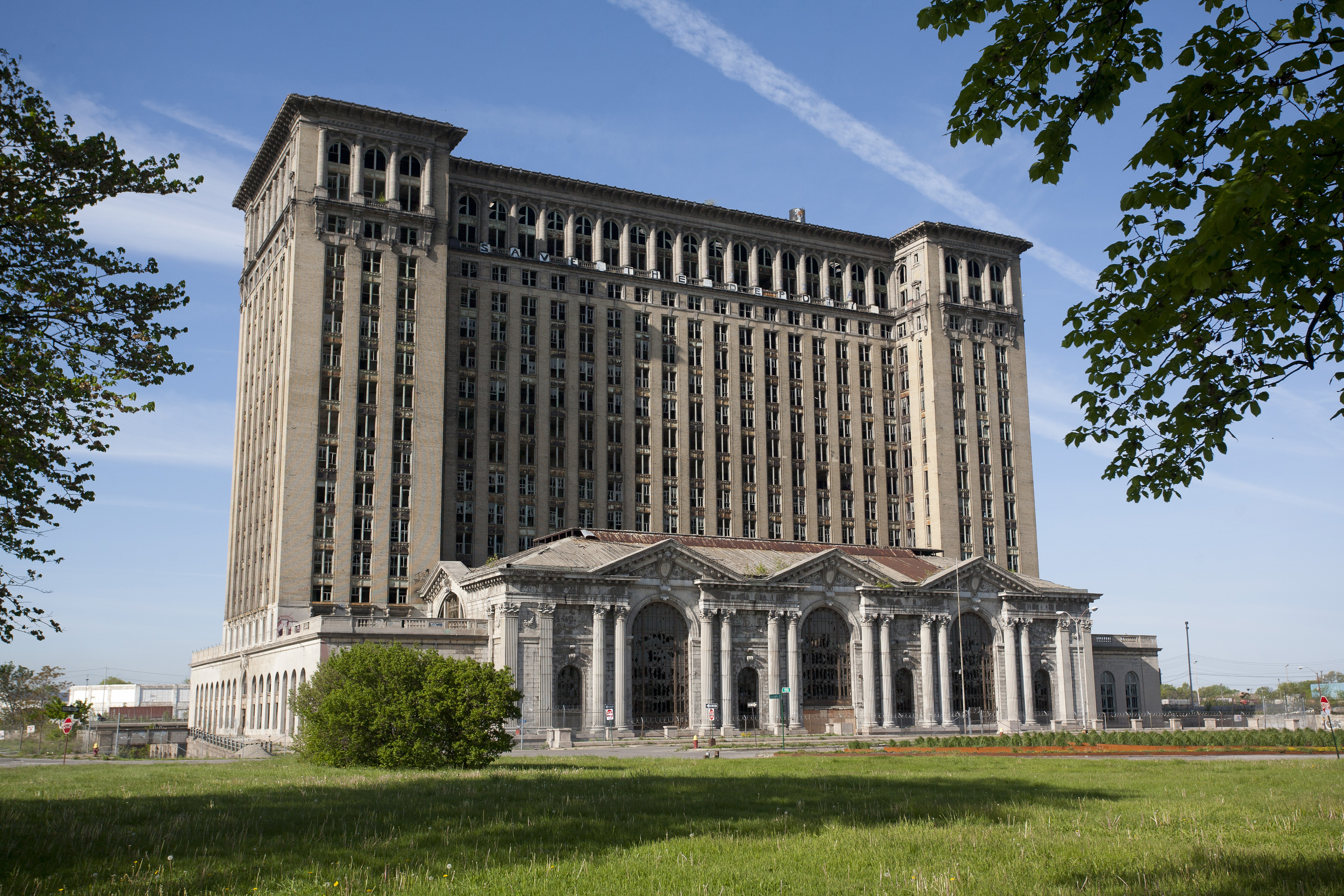
The historic, once abandoned Michigan Central Station was purchased by Ford Motor Company in May 2018 and is expected to undergo a significant four-year renovation.

On January 3, 2017, Ford CEO Mark Fields announced that in a "vote of confidence" because of the pro-business climate being fostered in part by President-elect Donald Trump, Ford had canceled plans to invest $1.6 billion in a new plant in Mexico to manufacture the Ford Focus; instead, the company would invest $700 million in Michigan, which it planned to use to create 700 new jobs. The Focus would now be manufactured in the existing plant in Mexico.

Also in 2017, Ford began development of a new mixed-use urban campus in the Corktown neighborhood of Detroit, with its purchase, renovation, and occupation of The Factory at Michigan and Rosa Parks. The new site was expected to have a major focus on the development of autonomous vehicle and electric vehicle technology. Ford later began buying up other parcels of land in Corktown including a very high-profile purchase of Michigan Central Station which is planned to become the hub of its Corktown campus, and the adjacent Roosevelt Warehouse. Ford expects to move 2,500 of its employees, roughly 5 percent of its southeast Michigan workforce, to the campus with space for an additional 2,500 entrepreneurs, technology companies and partners. Bill Ford envisioned the first-floor concourse of the train station to be a public gathering place with retail outlets and restaurants. In February 2017, Ford Motor Co. acquired majority ownership of Argo AI, a self-driving car startup.

In May 2017, Ford announced cuts to its global workforce amid efforts to address the company's declining share price and to improve profits. The company is targeting $3 billion in cost reduction and a nearly 10% reduction in the salaried workforce in Asia and North America to enhance earnings in 2018. Jim Hackett was announced to replace Mark Fields as CEO of Ford Motor. Mr. Hackett most recently oversaw the formation of Ford Smart Mobility, a unit responsible for experimenting with car-sharing programs, self-driving ventures and other programs aimed at helping Ford better compete with Uber, Alphabet Inc. and other tech giants looking to edge in on the auto industry.

On April 25, 2018, Ford announced that it would discontinue passenger cars in the North American market in the next four years, except for the Mustang, due to declining demand and profitability. The Focus Active, a crossover SUV based on the newly unveiled fourth-generation Focus, was also intended to be marketed in the United States. Due to the vehicle being manufactured in China, Ford later announced that it would not release the Focus Active in the United States, due to tariffs imposed by the Trump administration on Chinese exports.

In March 2020, the Detroit United Auto Workers union announced that after discussion with the leaders of General Motors, Ford, and Fiat Chrysler Automobiles, the carmakers would partially shut down factories on a "rotating" basis to mitigate the COVID-19 pandemic. On March 24, representatives of Ford announced that production in the US, Canada, and Mexico would not resume on March 30 as originally planned, amid the further coronavirus pandemic spread. In the first quarter of 2020, Ford's sales dropped by 15%, entailing the loss of $2 billion.

With the change in the demand for the sport vehicles, on January 6, 2021, Ford reported a sales fall of 9.8% in the fourth quarter, selling 542,749 vehicles, compared to 601,862 in 2019. In April 2021, Ford said that it would provide COVID-19 vaccines for its employees, who were to obtain them at the company; at the beginning the vaccination program would be in southeast Michigan, Missouri and Ohio, but it was to be expanded later on to other locations.

In May 2021, Ford announced a battery joint venture, BlueOval SK, with SK Innovation in North America.

In September 2021, Ford entered a partnership with self-driving startup Argo AI and American multinational retail corporation Walmart, and introduced a multi-city service for Walmart customers to have their online orders of groceries delivered to their homes by Ford's self-driving test vehicles with Argo's self-driving system.

In March 2022, Ford announced that it would restructure the company into three separate divisions. Ford Model E is to focus on electric vehicles; Ford Blue is to focus on internal combustion vehicles; and the existing commercial division is to be rebranded as Ford Pro, to focus on vehicle distribution and service. In August 2022, Ford announced it planned layoffs of roughly 3,000 employees and contract workers, confirming earlier reporting. The cuts would mostly affect divisions in the US, Canada, and India, which Jim Farley said would allow the company to prepare for the future of electric, software-heavy vehicles.

In February 2023, Ford announced that it was going to cut 3,800 jobs across Europe, with the job cuts mainly focusing on its German and British workforce. Ford will be cutting 2,300 jobs from Germany, 1,300 from the United Kingdom, and an additional 200 jobs in the rest of Europe, according to the head of Ford Germany, Martin Sander. The cuts will mainly be done to the company's engineers. Ford also announced during the year that its electric vehicle business had lost $3 billion before taxes over the past two years and will lose a similar amount in 2023 as the company looks to significantly invest in Electric Technology. The Ford Model E is expected to be profitable by 2026.

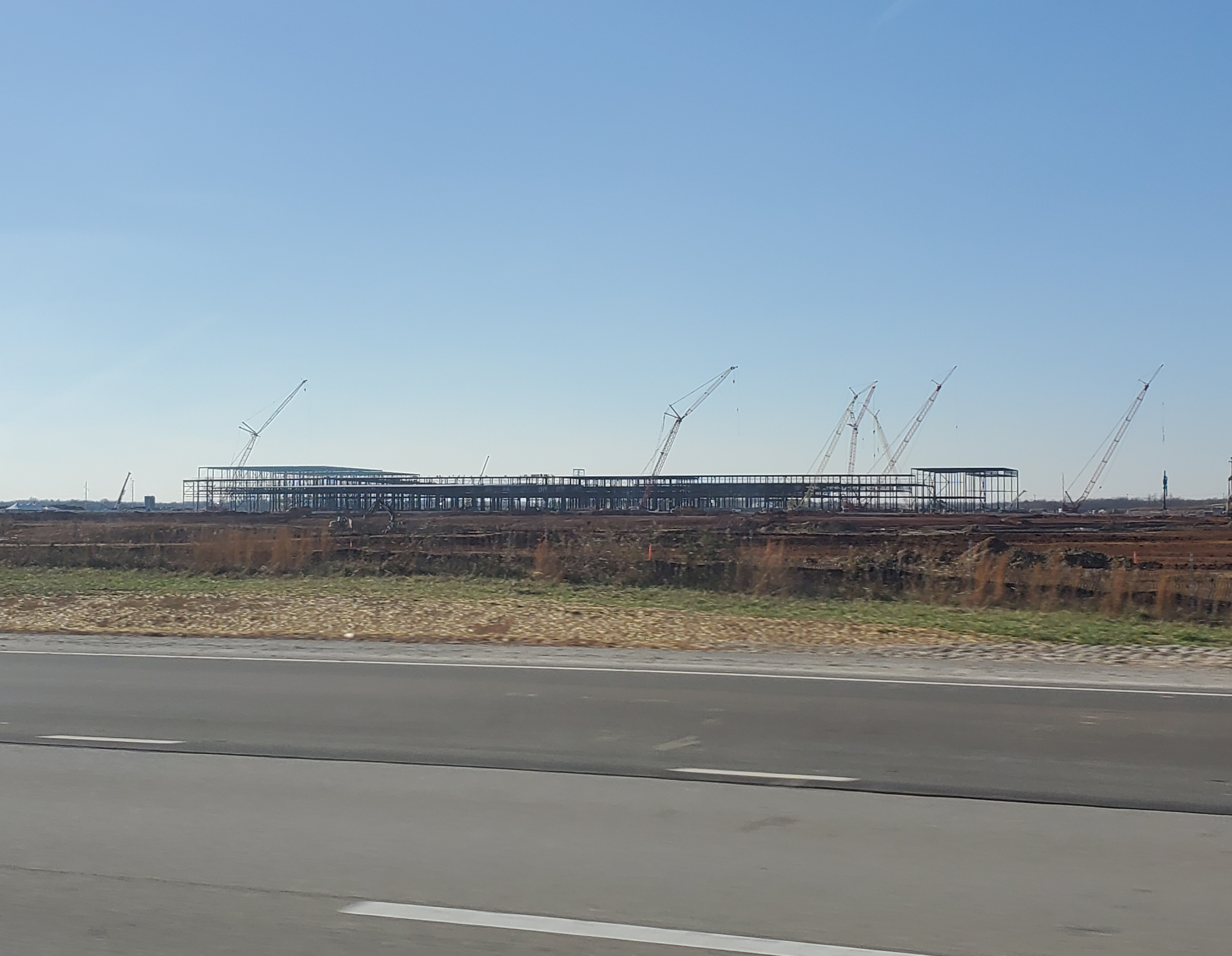
BlueOval SK Battery Park, dual gigafactories in Glendale, Kentucky under construction in 2022, known as "Kentucky 1 and Kentucky 2", and now known as "Ford Energy Systems"

In April 2023, United Kingdom ministers approved Ford's BlueCruise technology. Because of this assisted driving technology, Ford drivers can now legally take their hands off the wheel on certain roads. Its top speed is 129 km/h (80 mph). BlueCruise uses sensors and cameras to regulate the car's speed and to keep track of speed limits and road signs. It also monitors and keeps a safe distance from other vehicles. It also comes equipped with an eye-tracking system. If the driver stops looking at the road then the car will gradually reduce its speed. This technology will initially be offered in Ford's 2023 model of the electric Mustang Mach-E SUV. According to Thatcham Research, an automotive research company, this model is not a self-driving car. It is classified as a level 2 or partial automation assistance system. This means that technology controls two or more driving aspects but still requires human driver control in cases of emergencies. The driver is still legally responsible for accidents. In August 2024 Pennsylvania State Police filed charges against a driver that killed two men while using BlueCruise.

In November 2024, Ford announced that it would cut 800 jobs in the UK and 2,900 in Germany to try to reduce costs.

In September 2025, Ford announced the relocation of its headquarters from the Henry Ford II World Center, commonly known as the "Glass House," to a new facility in Dearborn. The new Ford World Headquarters opened on November 16, 2025, with all operations expected to relocate by mid-2026, after which the Glass House is slated to be demolished.

In December 2025, Ford entered a joint venture disposition agreement with SK On, dividing the BlueOval SK plants and pivoting to BESS (battery energy storage system).

In December 2025, Ford announced write-downs totaling $19.5 billion on its investments in electric mobility. Originally, nearly half of all vehicles sold were supposed to be hybrids or electric cars by 2030. However, as part of the second Trump administration's cuts to subsidies, several planned electric models were scrapped in order to focus on hybrid and internal combustion engine vehicles.

In July 2026, amid the Dieselgate scandal, British courts dismissed the allegations against five manufacturers, including Ford, ruling in their favor.

=== Logo history ===
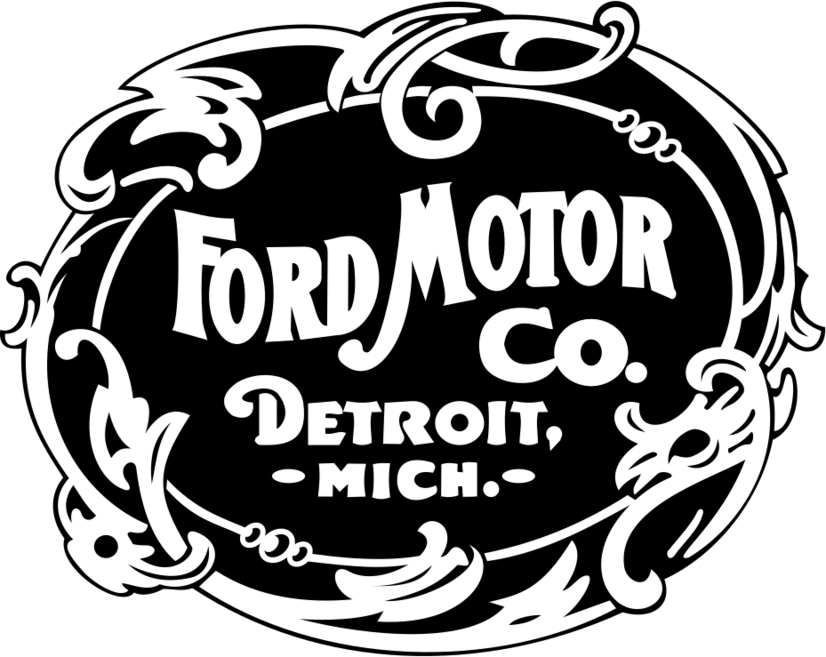
1903

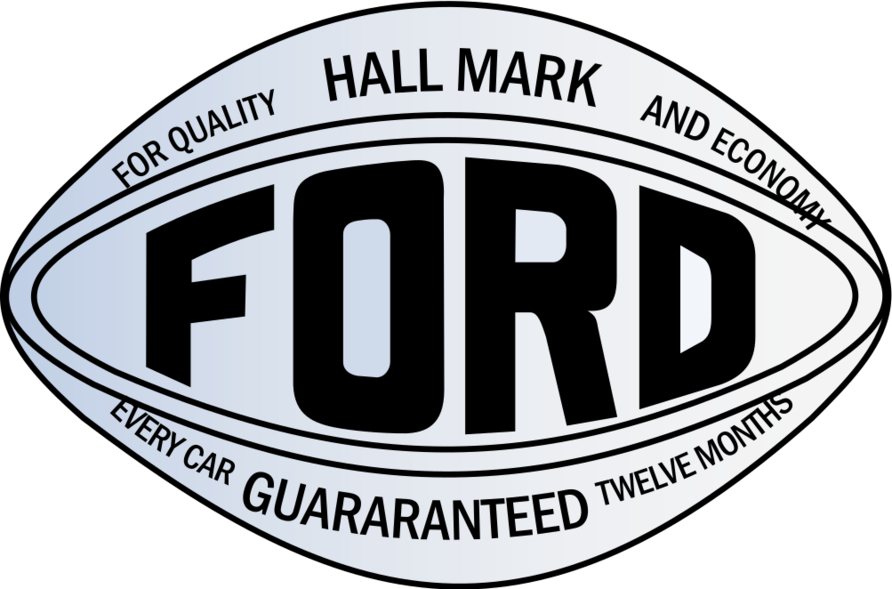
1907

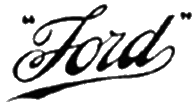
1909

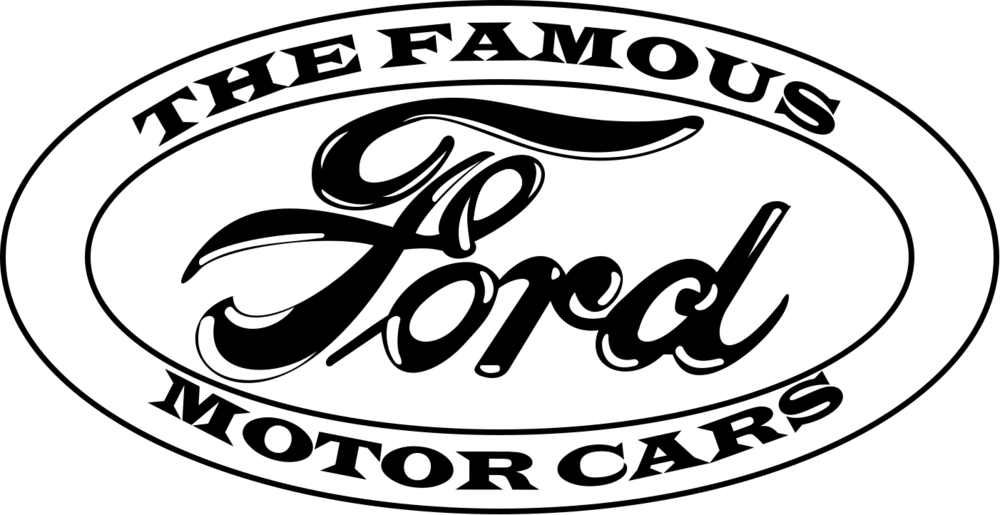
1911

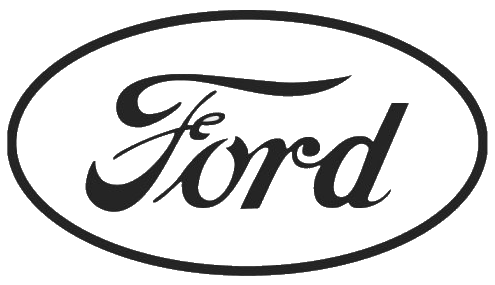
1912

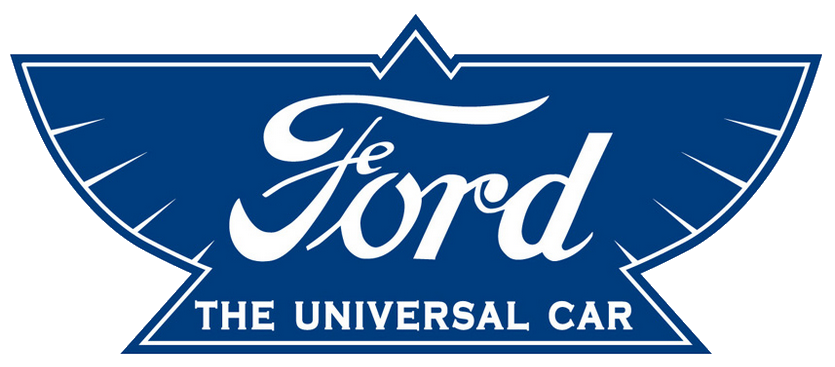
1912 variant

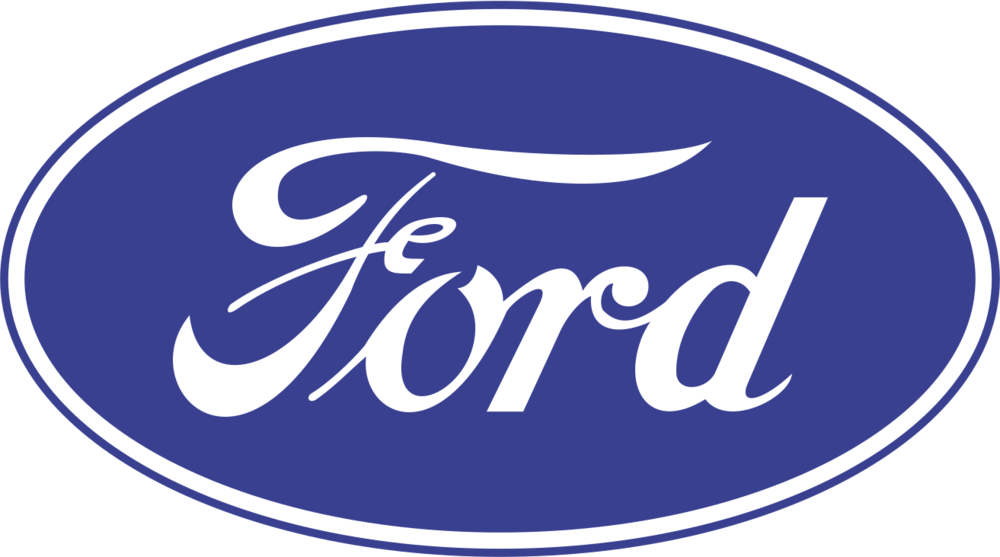
1927

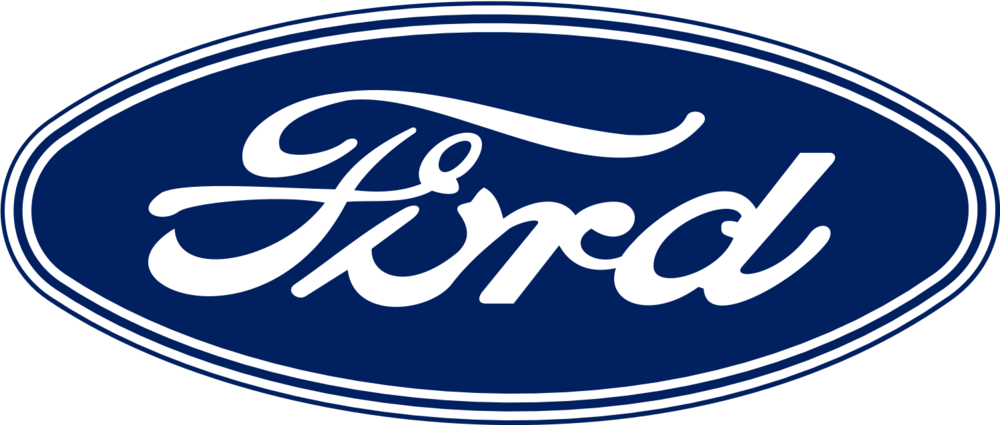
1957

1976

2003

2017

== Corporate affairs ==
=== Business trends ===
The key trends for the Ford Motor Company are (as of the financial year ending December 31):

	Revenue (US$ bn)	Net profit (US$ bn)	Total assets (US$ bn)	Employees (k)	Car sales worldwide (m)
2016	151	4.5	237	201	6.6
2017	156	7.7	257	202	6.6
2018	160	3.6	256	199	5.9
2019	155	0.04	258	190	5.3
2020	127	−1.2	267	186	4.1
2021	136	17.9	257	183	3.9
2022	158	−1.9	255	173	4.2
2023	176	4.3	273	177	4.4
2024	185	5.9	285	171	4.5
2025	187	−8.2	289	169	4.4

=== Executive management ===
Members of the Ford board as of January 2025 are: William Clay Ford Jr. (executive chairman), Jim Farley (president and CEO), Kimberly Casiano, Adriana Cisneros, Alexandra Ford English (daughter of William Clay Ford Jr.), Henry Ford III (son of Edsel Ford II), William W. Helman IV, Jon Huntsman Jr., William E. Kennard, John C. May, Beth E. Mooney, John L. Thornton, John Veihmeyer, Lynn Vojvodich Radakovich, and John S. Weinberg.

Jim Farley succeeded Jim Hackett as the chief executive officer of the company in August 2020; he previously served as Ford's chief operating officer. Hackett stayed in the company as an advisor until the second quarter of 2021.

=== Ownership ===
Ford is mainly owned by institutional investors, who own around 60% of shares. The largest shareholders in December 2023 were:

- The Vanguard Group (8.71%)
- BlackRock (7.20%)
- State Street Corporation (4.46%)
- Newport Trust (3.98%)
- Charles Schwab Corporation (2.25%)
- Geode Capital Management (1.94%)
- Fisher Investments (1.52%)
- Morgan Stanley (1.31%)
- Norges Bank (1.00%)
- Northern Trust (0.94%)

=== Ford Philanthropy ===
The Ford Philanthropy, formerly known as the Ford Motor Company Fund (also known as Ford Fund, not affiliated with the Ford Foundation), based in Dearborn, Michigan, is the philanthropic arm of the Ford Motor Company. Established in 1949 by Henry Ford II, the organization is a nonprofit corporate foundation financed by contributions from Ford Motor Company. In 2017, it contributed $63 million to various causes with a focus on education, driving safely and community building.

The Ford Driving Skills for Life program is a driver safety program aimed at teens that were developed together with the Governors Highway Safety Association and safety experts. The Ford Volunteer Corps allows Ford employees and retirees to sign up for volunteering work on local projects in more than 40 countries. The organization invests $18 million annually in education in the United States and around the world, but accepts applications only from nonprofit organizations registered in the U.S. Education programs and scholarships include Alan Mulally Engineering Scholarship, Ford Blue Oval Scholars Program, Ford College Community Challenge (Ford C3), Ford Driving Dreams Tour, Ford Fund/Detroit Free Press Journalism Scholarship, Ford Next Generation Learning (Ford NGL), Grants to Individuals Program, HBCU Community Challenge, Smithsonian Latino Center Young Ambassadors Program, and William Clay Ford Automotive Design Scholarship.

On April 29, 2024, the Ford Fund announced its official name has changed to Ford Philanthropy.

=== FordWorks Program ===
Ford Motor Company created the FordWorks program in 2016 with the aim to bring people with disabilities back into the workforce. It was the first automotive program to focus on bringing people with autism in the workforce in the US. They targeted people with autism but have expanded their criteria to people with other disabilities. Ford has partnered with Upbound to broaden their hiring under the FordWorks program.

== Operations ==
Operations by country (2024)
Sales		Long-Lived Assets	
Country	unit thousands	Country	USD millions
United States	2,200	United States	45,392
China	442	Canada	6,548
Canada	269	Mexico	4,352
United Kingdom	242	United Kingdom	2,174
Germany	155	Other countries	6,409
Turkey	114		
Italy	109		
Australia	104		
Other countries	835		

Ford has had manufacturing operations worldwide, including in the United States, Canada, Mexico, China, India, the United Kingdom, Germany, Turkey, Brazil, Argentina, Australia, and South Africa. Ford also helped the Soviet Union to construct Russian automaker GAZ.

=== North America ===
In May 2010, Ford reported that its sales increased 23% for the month, and that 37% of its sales came from fleet sales. In June 2010, sales to individual customers at dealerships increased 13% while fleet sales rose by 32%. In the first seven months of 2010, fleet sales of Ford for the same period rose 35% to 386,000 units while retail sales increase 19%. Fleet sales account for 39 percent of Chrysler's sales and 31 percent for GM's.

In 2025, Ford reported higher automobile sales due to stronger demand for its hybrid models and affordable pickup truck. Sales rose by 6% year-on-year.

=== Europe ===
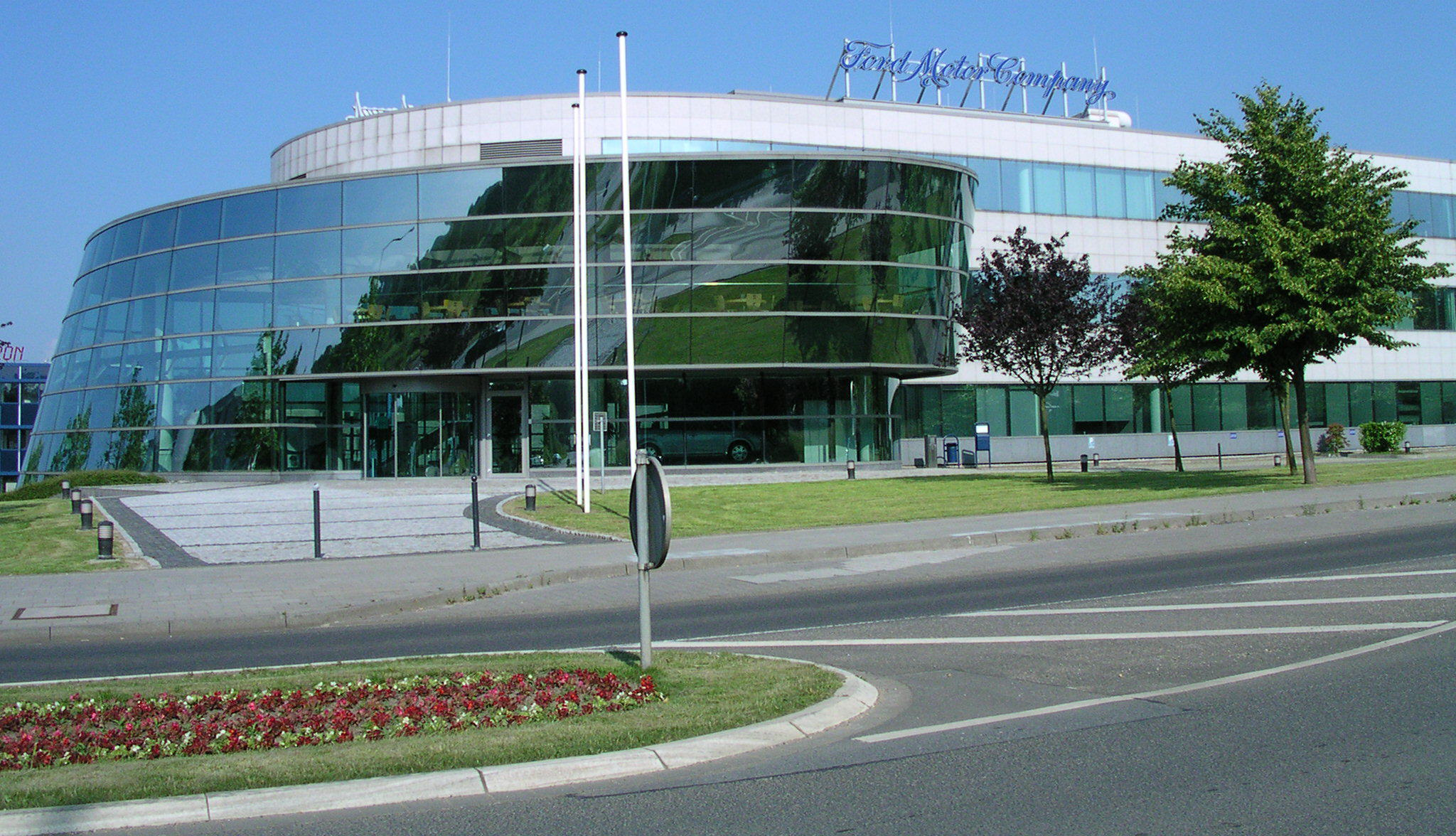
The Ford Research Center in Aachen, Germany, photographed in 2006

At first, Ford in Germany and Ford in Britain built different models from one another until 1965, when the Ford Transit and later the Ford Escort and the Ford Capri became common to both companies. In 1970, the Ford Taunus and the Ford Cortina came into production with a common base construction, both models being produced in left hand drive and right hand drive. Later on, the models became identical and the respective models right- and left-hand-drive exclusively. Rationalisation of model ranges meant that production of many models in the UK switched to elsewhere in Europe, including Belgium and Spain as well as Germany. The Ford Sierra replaced the Taunus and Cortina in 1982, drawing criticism for its radical aerodynamic styling, which was soon given nicknames, the "Jellymould" and "The Salesman's Spaceship".

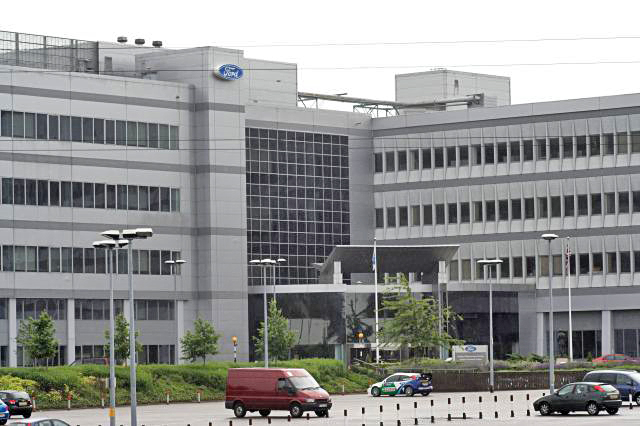
Ford's Dunton Technical Centre in Laindon, United Kingdom, the largest automotive research and development facility in the country, pictured in 2006

In February 2002, Ford ended car production in the UK. It was the first time in 90 years that Ford cars had not been made in Britain, although production of the Transit van continued at the company's Southampton facility until mid-2013, engines at Bridgend and Dagenham, and transmissions at Halewood. Development of European Ford is broadly split between Dunton in Essex (powertrain, Fiesta/Ka, and commercial vehicles) and Cologne (body, chassis, electrical, Focus, Mondeo) in Germany. Ford also produced the Thames range of commercial vehicles, although the use of this brand name was discontinued with the introduction of the Ford Transit in 1965. Elsewhere in continental Europe, Ford assembles the Mondeo, Galaxy, S-Max and Kuga in Valencia (Spain), Fiesta in Cologne (Germany), Focus in Saarlouis (Germany), Ecosport and Puma in Craiova (Romania).

Ford also owns a joint-venture production plant in Turkey. Ford Otosan, established in the 1970s, manufactures the Transit Connect compact panel van as well as the "Jumbo" and long-wheelbase versions of the full-size Transit. This new production facility was set up near Kocaeli in 2002, and its opening marked the end of Transit assembly in Genk.

Another joint venture plant near Setúbal in Portugal, set up in collaboration with Volkswagen, formerly assembled the Galaxy people-carrier as well as its sister ships, the VW Sharan and SEAT Alhambra. With the introduction of the third generation of the Galaxy, Ford has moved the production of the people-carrier to the Genk plant, with Volkswagen taking over sole ownership of the Setúbal facility.

In 2008, Ford acquired a majority stake in Automobile Craiova, Romania. Starting 2009, the Ford Transit Connect was Ford's first model produced in Craiova, followed, in 2012, by low-capacity car engines and a new small class car, the B-Max. In 2022, Ford Romania was acquired by Ford Otosan and in 2023, production of the Ford Transit Courier/Tourneo Courier started at the facility.

Its 1959 Anglia two-door saloon was one of the most quirky-looking small family cars in Europe at the time of its launch, but buyers soon became accustomed to its looks and it was hugely popular with British buyers in particular. It was still selling well when replaced by the more practical Escort in 1967.

The third incarnation of the Ford Escort was launched in 1980 and marked the company's move from rear-wheel-drive saloons to front-wheel-drive hatchbacks in the small family car sector.

The fourth-generation Escort was produced from 1990 until 2000, although its successor—the Focus—had been on sale since 1998. On its launch, the Focus was arguably the most dramatic-looking and fine-handling small family cars on sale and sold in huge volumes right up to the launch of the next-generation Focus at the end of 2004.

The 1982 Ford Sierra—replacement for the long-running and massively popular Cortina and Taunus models—was a style-setter at the time of its launch. Its ultramodern aerodynamic design was a world away from a boxy, sharp-edged Cortina, and it was massively popular just about everywhere it was sold. A series of updates kept it looking relatively fresh until it was replaced by the front-wheel-drive Mondeo at the start of 1993.

The rise in popularity of small cars during the 1970s saw Ford enter the mini-car market in 1976 with its Fiesta hatchback. Most of its production was concentrated at Valencia in Spain, and the Fiesta sold in huge figures from the very start. An update in 1983 and the launch of an all-new model in 1989 strengthened its position in the small car market.

On October 24, 2012, Ford announced that it would close its Genk assembly plant in eastern Belgium by the end of 2014.

In 2015, Ford announced that it took control of Ford Sollers, Ford's joint venture with Russian company Sollers.

In September 2018, at the IAA Commercial Vehicles show in Hannover, Germany, Ford introduced an electric tractor-trailer concept vehicle dubbed the F-Vision, which would have Level 4 autonomous driving capability.

On March 1, 2022, Ford announced that it was suspending its Sollers joint venture operation in Russia, in response to the 2022 Russian invasion of Ukraine. On October 26, 2022, Ford sold its 49 percent share in the joint venture, and exited the Russian market, adding that it retains the option to buy them back within a 5-year period "should the global situation change".

=== East and Southeast Asia ===
Ford formed its first passenger-vehicle joint venture in China in 2001, six years behind GM and more than a decade after VW. It has spent as of 2013 $4.9 billion to expand its lineup and double production capacity in China to 600,000 vehicles. This includes Ford's largest-ever factory complex in the southwestern city of Chongqing. Ford had 2.5% of the Chinese market in 2013, while VW controlled 14.5% and GM had 15.6%, according to consultant LMC Automotive. GM outsells Ford in China by more than six-to-one. Ford's presence in Asia has traditionally been much smaller, confined to Malaysia, Singapore, Hong Kong, the Philippines, and Taiwan, where Ford has had a joint venture with Lio Ho since the 1970s. Ford began assembly of cars in Thailand in 1960, but withdrew from the country in 1976, and did not return until 1995 when it formed a joint venture with Mazda called Auto Alliance. Now based in the Bo-win Sub District of the Sriracha District in Chonburi, the factory still produces passenger automobiles. The factory, built in 1941 in Singapore, was soon taken over by the Japanese during the war and was the site of a surrender of the British to the Japanese, at the factory site which is now a national monument in Singapore. On April 30, 2013, Ford Motor Co. launched its car and pickup truck line in Myanmar. Previously, heavy importation taxes had stifled imported car purchases in Myanmar, but due to currency reform, lifting of previous import restrictions, and the abolishment of shadow currency, Myanmar's car market had grown in demand.

Ford decided to shut down its entire operations in Indonesia, including its dealer network by second half of 2016. Since 2016, Ford operation in Indonesia has been taken over by RMA Group. RMA Group would resume the distribution new Ford cars in 2020, 4 years since last Ford left Indonesian market

==== South Korea ====
In 1967, Ford partnered with the South Korean company Hyundai, and at the new factory in Ulsan, South Korea, built the European Ford Cortina until 1974 when Hyundai introduced its all-new Hyundai Pony in 1975. Ford then developed a relationship with Korea's oldest car manufacturer Kia which built vehicles co-engineered with Mazda, later selling the Ford Festiva from 1988 to 1993, and the Ford Aspire from 1994 to 1997 for export to the United States. With the acquisition of a stake in Japanese manufacturer Mazda in 1979, Ford began selling Mazda's Familia and Capella as the Ford Laser and Telstar throughout the region, replacing the European-sourced Escort and Cortina. From 1989 to 1996, Kia imported the Mercury Sable from Ford in the U.S. and sold them in South Korea as the Kia Sable. Though the Sable was branded and marketed as a Kia, it retained the Mercury badges and emblem. Ford lost its Kia interest to Hyundai in 1998 after the 1997 Asian financial crisis. Kia had declared bankruptcy in 1997; in 1998, Hyundai Motor Company acquired 51% of the company, outbidding Ford which had owned an interest in Kia Motors since 1986. After subsequent divestments, Hyundai Motor Company owns less than 50% of the company but remains Kia's largest stakeholder.

As of 2020, Ford sells the Explorer, Mondeo, and Mustang, as well as the Lincoln Aviator, Continental, Corsair, MKZ, and Nautilus in South Korea.

=== South and West Asia ===
Ford India began production in 1998 at Chennai, Tamil Nadu, with its Ford Escort model, which was later replaced by the locally produced Ford Ikon in 2001. It has since added the Fusion, Fiesta, Mondeo and Endeavour models to its product line.

On March 9, 2010, Ford launched its first made-for-India compact car. Starting at ₹349,900, the Figo was Ford's first car designed and priced for the mass Indian market. On July 28, 2011, Ford India signed a memorandum of understanding (MoU) with the State of Gujarat for the construction of an assembly and engine plant in Sanand and planned to invest approximately US$1 billion on a 460-acre site. In 2019, the company and Mahindra & Mahindra formed a joint venture to develop, market and distribute Ford-branded vehicles in India. In September 2021 Ford India announced plans to shut down both its assembly plants. The company said that it intends to maintain its parts and service network.

Ford's market presence in the Middle East has traditionally been small, partly due to previous Arab boycotts of companies dealing with Israel. Ford and Lincoln vehicles are currently marketed in ten countries in the region. Saudi Arabia, Kuwait, and the United Arab Emirates are the biggest markets. Ford also established itself in Egypt in 1926 but faced an uphill battle during the 1950s due to the hostile nationalist business environment. Ford's distributor in Saudi Arabia announced in February 2003 that it had sold 100,000 Ford and Lincoln vehicles since commencing sales in November 1986. Half of the Ford and Lincoln vehicles sold in that country were Ford Crown Victorias. In 2004, Ford sold 30,000 units in the region, falling far short of General Motors' 88,852 units and Nissan Motors' 75,000 units.

=== South America ===
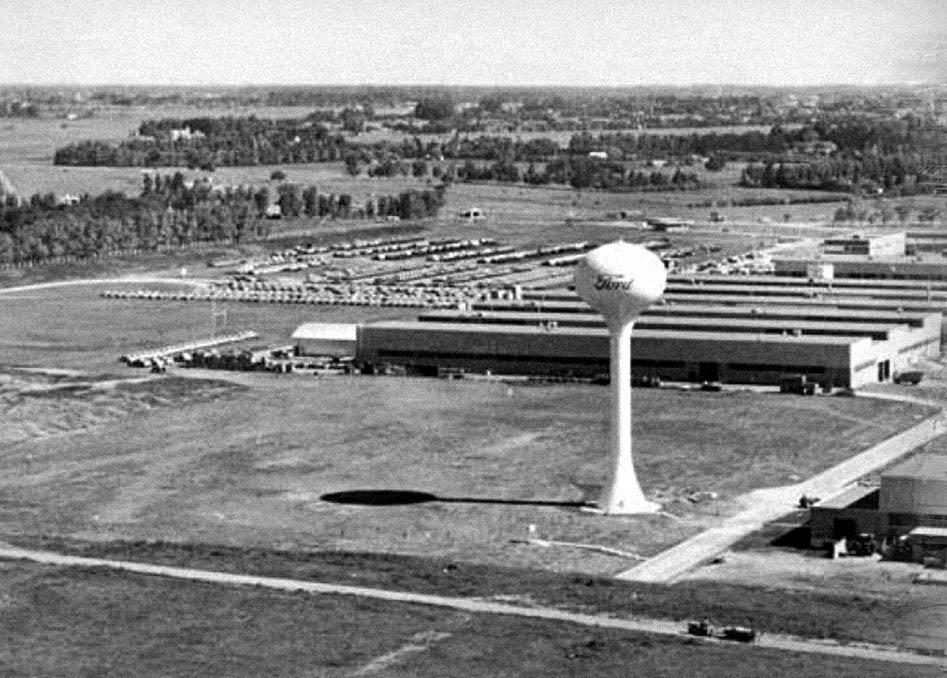
Ford assembly plant in General Pacheco, Argentina, as seen in the 1960s

In South America, Ford's primary operations are in Brazil, Argentina, and Ford Andina (Colombia, Ecuador, and Venezuela). Ford employs over 18,000 people and operates seven assembly or other plants in the region. In 1987, Ford Brasil and Ford Motor Argentina merged its operations with the Brazilian and Argentine operations of Volkswagen Group, forming a new joint-venture company called Autolatina with a shared model range. Autolatina was dissolved in 1995.

In early 2021, Ford's Brazil branch announced it would completely cease production in the country over the course of a few months.

=== Africa ===
In Africa, Ford's market presence has traditionally been strongest in South Africa and neighbouring countries, with only trucks being sold elsewhere on the continent. Ford in South Africa began by importing kits from Canada to be assembled at its facility in Port Elizabeth; the company later sourced its models from the UK and Australia, with local versions of the Ford Cortina including the XR6, with a 3.0 V6 engine, and a Cortina-based 'bakkie' or pick-up, which was exported to the UK. In the mid-1980s Ford merged with a rival company, owned by Anglo American, to form the South African Motor Corporation (Samcor).

Following international condemnation of apartheid, Ford divested from South Africa in 1988, and sold its stake in Samcor, although it licensed the use of its brand name to the company. Samcor began to assemble Mazdas as well, which affected its product line-up and saw the European Fords like the Escort and Sierra replaced by the Mazda-based Laser and Telstar. Ford bought a 45 per cent stake in Samcor following the demise of apartheid in 1994, and this later became, once again, a wholly owned subsidiary, the Ford Motor Company of Southern Africa. Ford now sells a local sedan version of the Fiesta (also built in India and Mexico), and the Focus. The Falcon model from Australia was also sold in South Africa, but was dropped in 2003; the Mondeo, after briefly being assembled locally, was dropped in 2005. The Mondeo was later reintroduced in 2015, badged as the Fusion, but was dropped in 2017.

=== Research ===
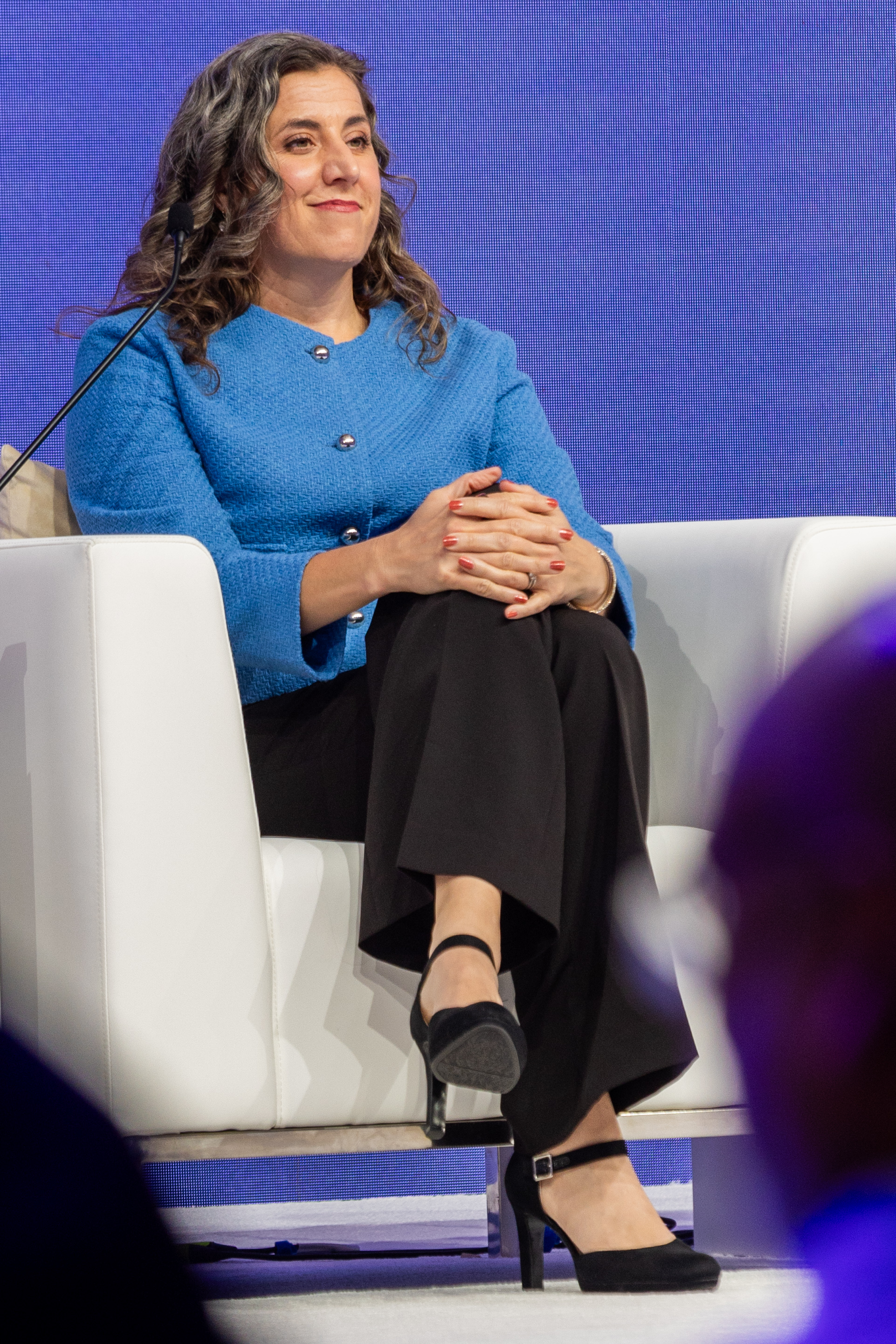
Jennifer Brace, chief futurist at Ford, Dubai Future Forum (2024)

Ford Research and Innovation Center is the name of the technology research facilities of Ford Motor Company in

- Dearborn, Michigan
- Palo Alto, California
- Aachen, Germany
- Nanjing, China

The Ford Research and Innovation Center in Palo Alto was first opened in 2012, and in January 2015, announced plans to significantly expand its operations.

Ford has the position of chief futurist in charge of forecasting which was started in 2019 by Sheryl Connelly, and is currently held by Jennifer Brace.

== Former operations ==
=== East and Southeast Asia ===
==== Ford of Japan ====
Ford established a manufacturing facility in the port city of Yokohama in February 1925, where Model T vehicles were assembled using imported knock-down kits. The factory subsequently produced 10,000 Model A's up to 1936. Production ceased in 1940 as a result of political tensions between Japan and the United States.

After World War II, Ford did not have a presence in Japan, as the Ford facility was appropriated by the Japanese Government until 1958 when property was returned as a possession of the Ford Motor Company and became a research and development location for Ford partner Mazda. In 1979, Ford acquired a 24.5% ownership stake in Mazda, and in 1982, Ford and Mazda jointly established a sales channel to sell Ford products in Japan, including vehicles manufactured in North America, at a dealership called Autorama (Japanese: オートラマ). The Autorama sales channel was renamed Ford Sales of Japan in 1997.

Vehicles sold at Autorama locations were the North American assembled Ford Explorer, Probe (1989–1998), Mustang, Taurus (1989–1997), Thunderbird (1990–1993), Lincoln Continental, and Lincoln LS. Ford products manufactured in Europe that were sold in Japan were the Ford Mondeo, Ka, Focus, Focus C-MAX, Fiesta, and the Galaxy. Mazda manufactured Ford vehicles in Japan and sold them as Fords at the Autorama locations. They were the Ford Telstar (Mazda Capella), Laser, Festiva, Festiva Mini Wagon, Ixion (Mazda Premacy), Freda (Mazda Bongo Friendee), Spectron (Mazda Bongo), and commercial trucks J80 and the J100 (Mazda Bongo truck).

Ford increased its shareholding in Mazda to 33.4% in 1996, but as of July 2016, it is listed at 11%. Ford did sell a small range of vehicles in Japan; as of October 2010, the Ford Mustang, Escape, Explorer (and Explorer pickup truck), Ford Kuga, Lincoln Navigator, Lincoln MKX, and more recently, the Ford Ecosport were available in Japan. As of February 2016, Ford no longer maintains a regional office in Minato, Tokyo, Japan, and sales of new cars in Japan have ended.

=== Oceania ===
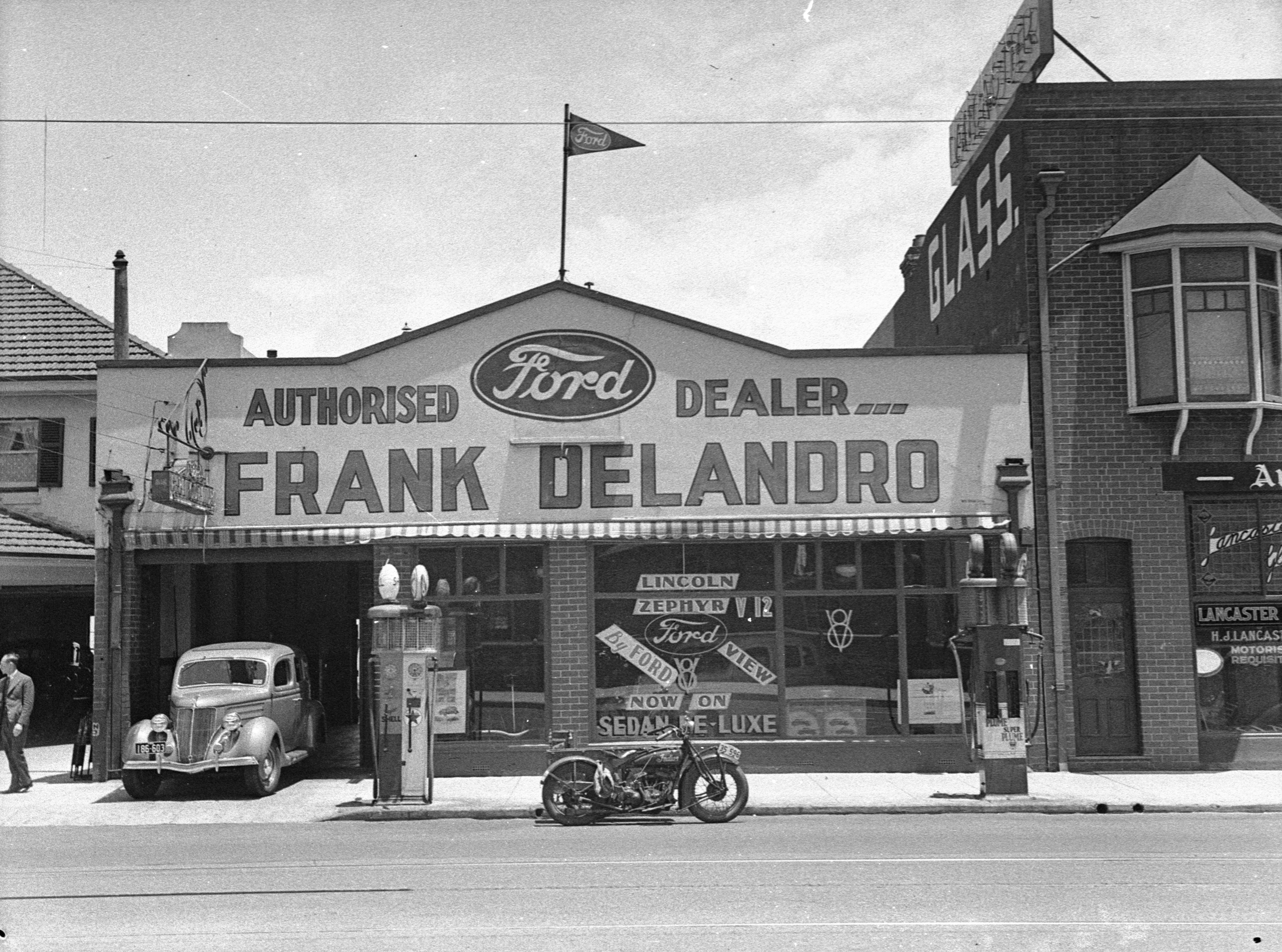
Frank Delandro Authorised Ford dealer, Crows Nest, Sydney, 1936

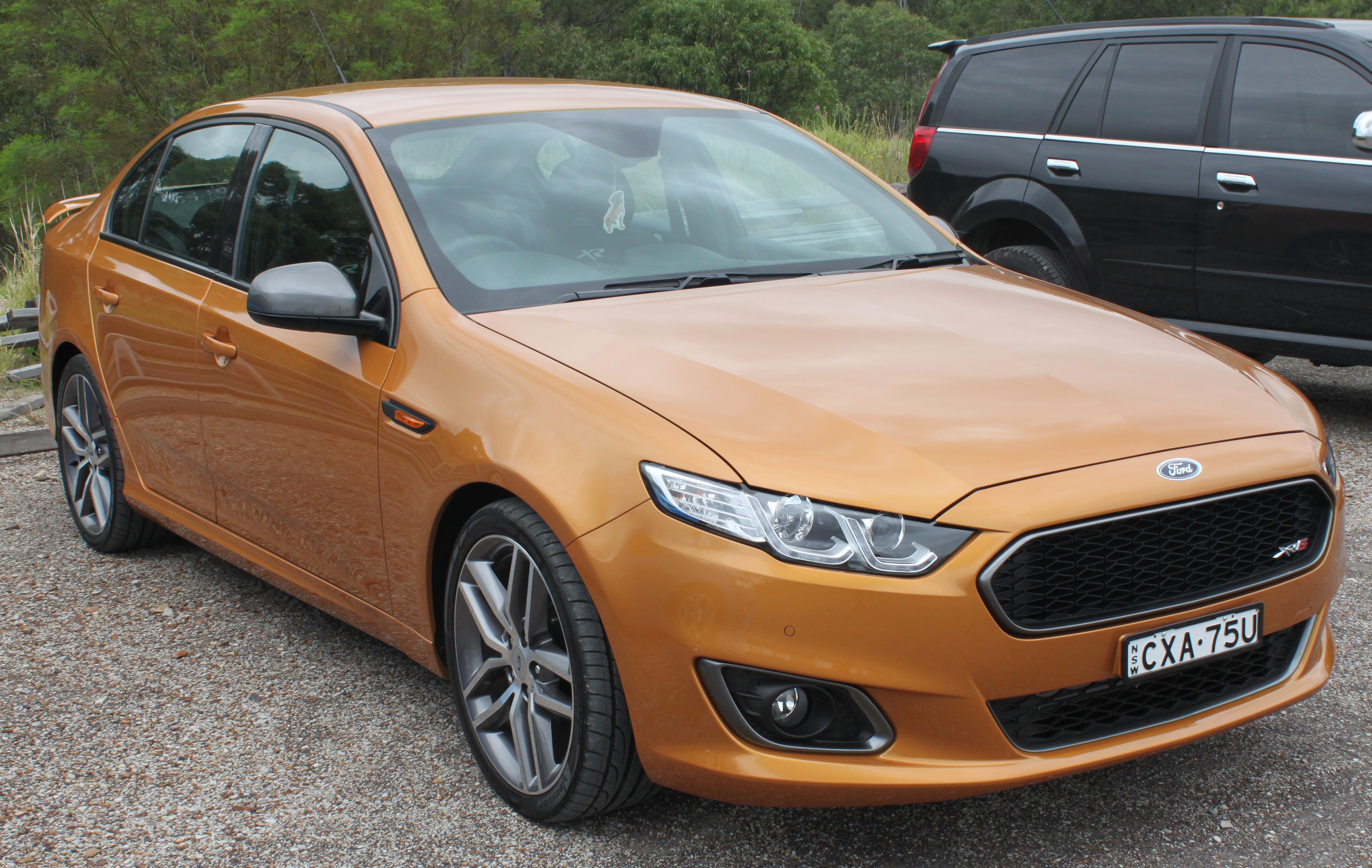
Ford FG X Falcon (Australia) (2014–2016; 2014 model shown)

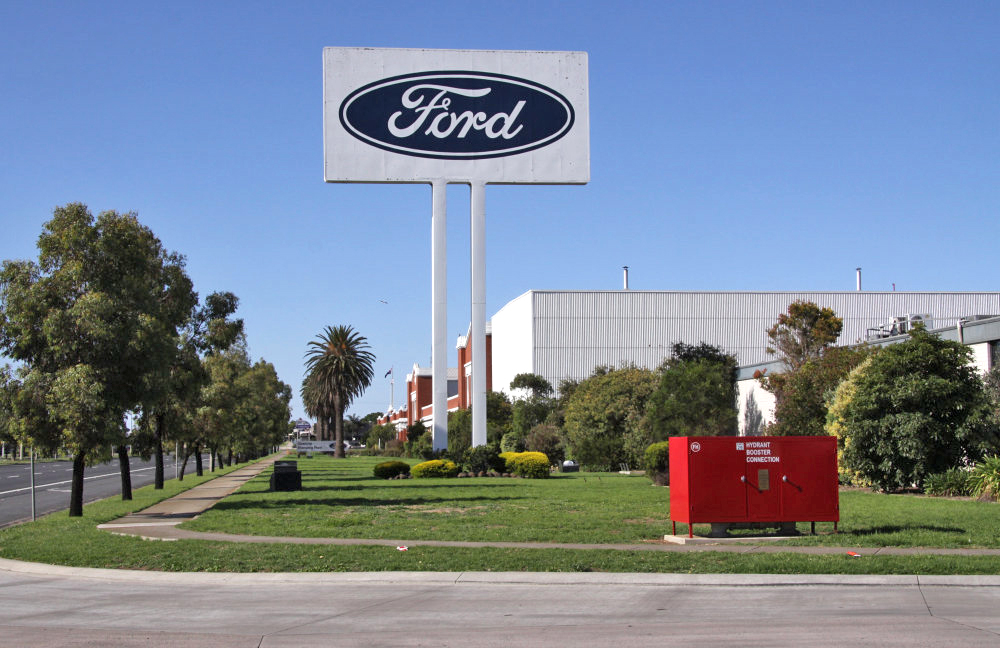
The Ford stamping plant in Geelong, Victoria, Australia. It closed in 2016.

In Australia and New Zealand, the popular Ford Falcon (1960–2016) had long been considered the average family car and is considerably larger than the Mondeo, Ford's largest car sold in Europe. Between 1960 and 1972, the Falcon was based on the U.S. model of the same name, but since then was entirely designed and manufactured in Australia until 2016, occasionally being manufactured in New Zealand. Like its General Motors rival, the Holden Commodore, the Falcon used a rear-wheel-drive layout. High-performance variants of the Falcon running locally built engines (the Barra engine) produced up to 436 hp (325 kW). A ute (coupé utility) version was also available with the same range of drivetrains. In addition, Ford Australia sold highly tuned limited-production Falcon sedans and utes through its performance car division, Ford Performance Vehicles from 2002 until it closed in 2014.

In Australia, the Commodore and Falcon had traditionally outsold all other cars and constituted over 20% of the new car market. In New Zealand, Ford was second in market share in the first eight months of 2006 with 14.4%. More recently, Ford has axed its Falcon-based LWB variant of its lineup– the Fairlane and LTD ranges. Ford discontinued the Fairlane in 2007 and LTD in 2008. Ford had announced that its Geelong engine manufacturing plant would be shut down between 2013 and 2016. They had earlier announced local manufacturing of the Focus small car starting from 2011, but instead decided to import the model from Ford's plant in Thailand.

In Australia, the Laser was one of Ford Australia's most successful models and was manufactured in Ford's Homebush West plant from 1981 until the plant's closure in September 1994. It outsold the Mazda 323, despite being almost identical to it because the Laser was manufactured in Australia and Ford was perceived as a local brand. According to research carried out by Ford Australia in 1984, a third of Laser buyers were unaware that the Ford model was based on the Mazda 323.

In New Zealand, the Ford Laser and Telstar were assembled alongside the Mazda 323 and 626 until 1997, at the Vehicle Assemblers of New Zealand (VANZ) plant in Wiri, Auckland. The Sierra wagon was also assembled in New Zealand, owing to the popularity of station wagons in that market.

The scheduled closure of Ford's Australian manufacturing base in 2016 was confirmed on May 23, 2013. Headquartered in the Victorian suburb of Broadmeadows, the company had registered losses worth AU$600 million over the five years prior to the announcement. It was noted that the corporate fleet and government sales that account for two-thirds of large, local car sales in Australia are insufficient to keep Ford's products profitable and viable in Australia. The decision affected 1200 Ford workers—over 600 employees in Geelong and more than 500 in Broadmeadows—who lost their jobs by October 2016. The closure of Ford's plants in Norlane Geelong and Broadmeadows Melbourne occurred on October 7, 2016.

== Products and services ==
=== Automobiles ===
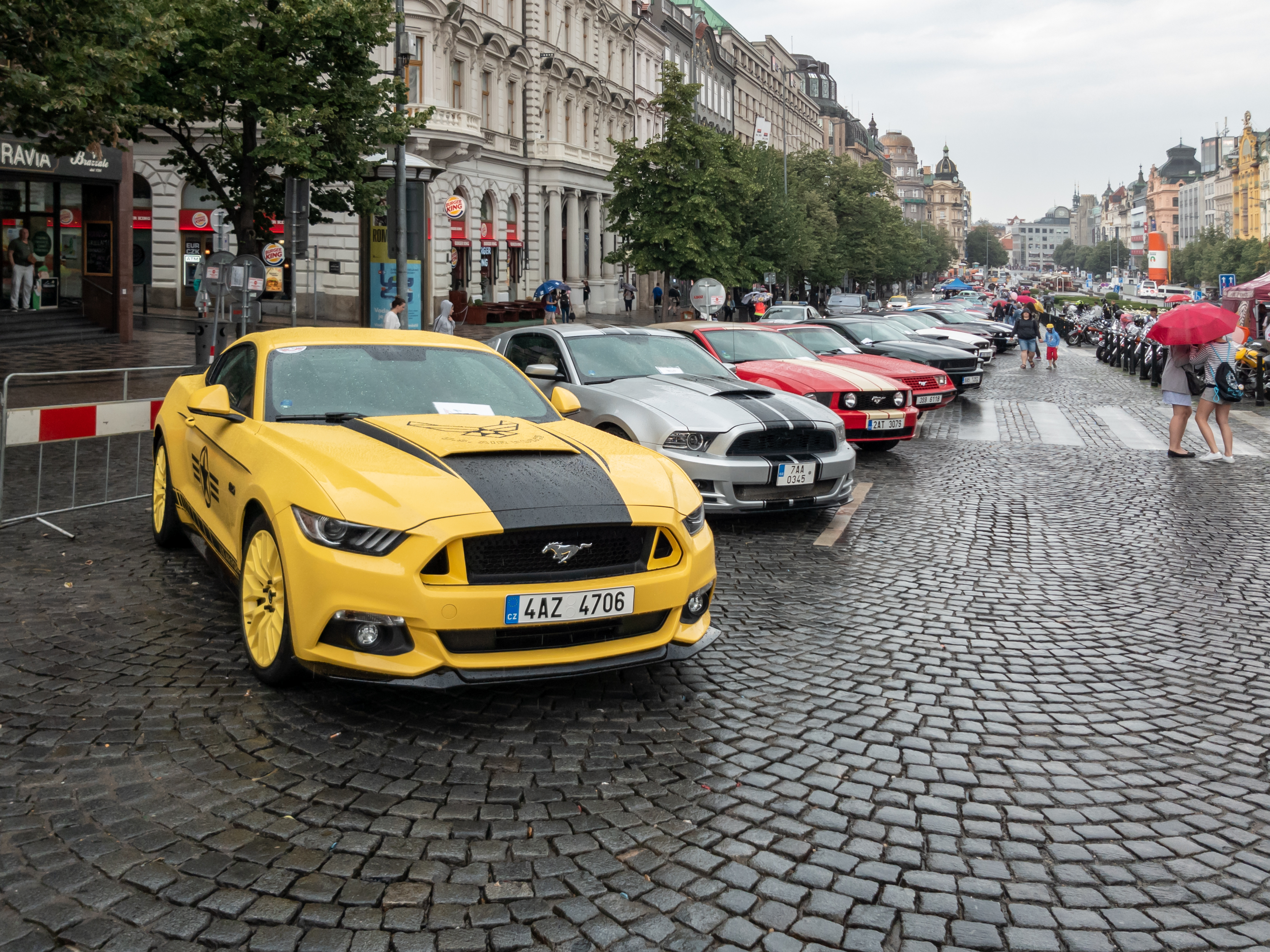
Ford Mustangs of various years on display at Wenceslas Square, Prague, Czech Republic in 2019. The vehicle is a popular model sold in many countries.

Ford Motor Company sells a broad range of automobiles under the Ford marque worldwide, and an additional range of luxury automobiles under the Lincoln marque in the United States. The company has sold vehicles under a number of other marques during its history. The Mercury brand was introduced by Ford in 1939, continuing in production until 2011 when poor sales led to its discontinuation. In 1958, Ford introduced the Edsel brand, but poor sales led to its discontinuation in 1960. In 1985, the Merkur brand was introduced in the United States to market products produced by Ford of Europe; it was discontinued in 1989.

Ford acquired the British sports car maker Aston Martin in 1989, later selling it on March 12, 2007, although retaining an 8% stake. Ford purchased Volvo Cars of Sweden in 1999, selling it to Zhejiang Geely Holding Group in 2010.

In November 2008, it reduced its 33.4% controlling interest in Mazda of Japan to a 13.4% non-controlling interest. On November 18, 2010, Ford reduced its stake further to just 3%, citing the reduction of ownership would allow greater flexibility to pursue growth in emerging markets. Ford and Mazda remain strategic partners through exchanges of technological information and joint ventures, including an American joint venture plant in Flat Rock, Michigan called Auto Alliance. In 2015, Ford sold its remaining 3% stake in Mazda.

Ford sold the United Kingdom-based Jaguar and Land Rover companies and brands to Tata Motors of India in March 2008.

On April 25, 2018, Ford announced that it planned to phase out all but one of its North American automobile models (the Mustang will be the sole surviving model) to focus primarily on pickup trucks and SUVs. Ford had also planned to introduce an "Active" crossover version of the next-generation Focus, but canceled those plans due to tariff issues between the United States and China.

=== Trucks ===
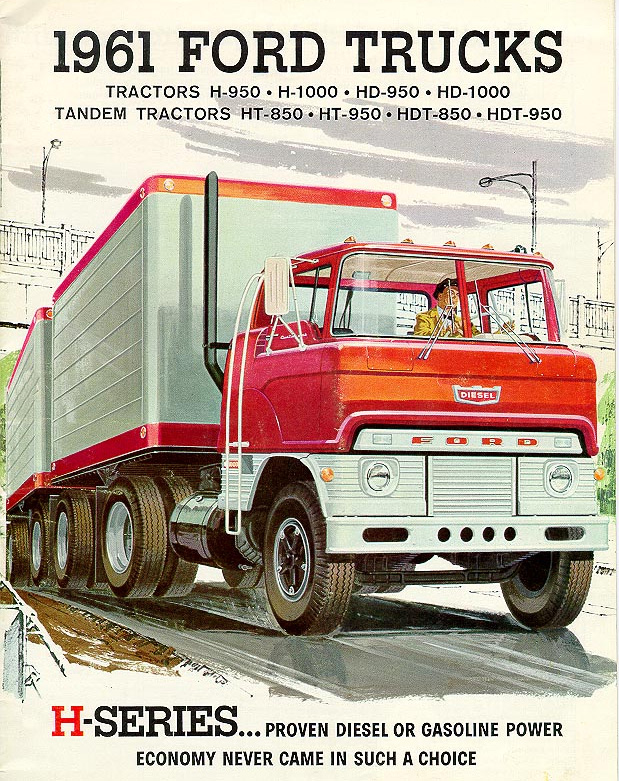
An advertisement for the 1961 Ford H-Series truck

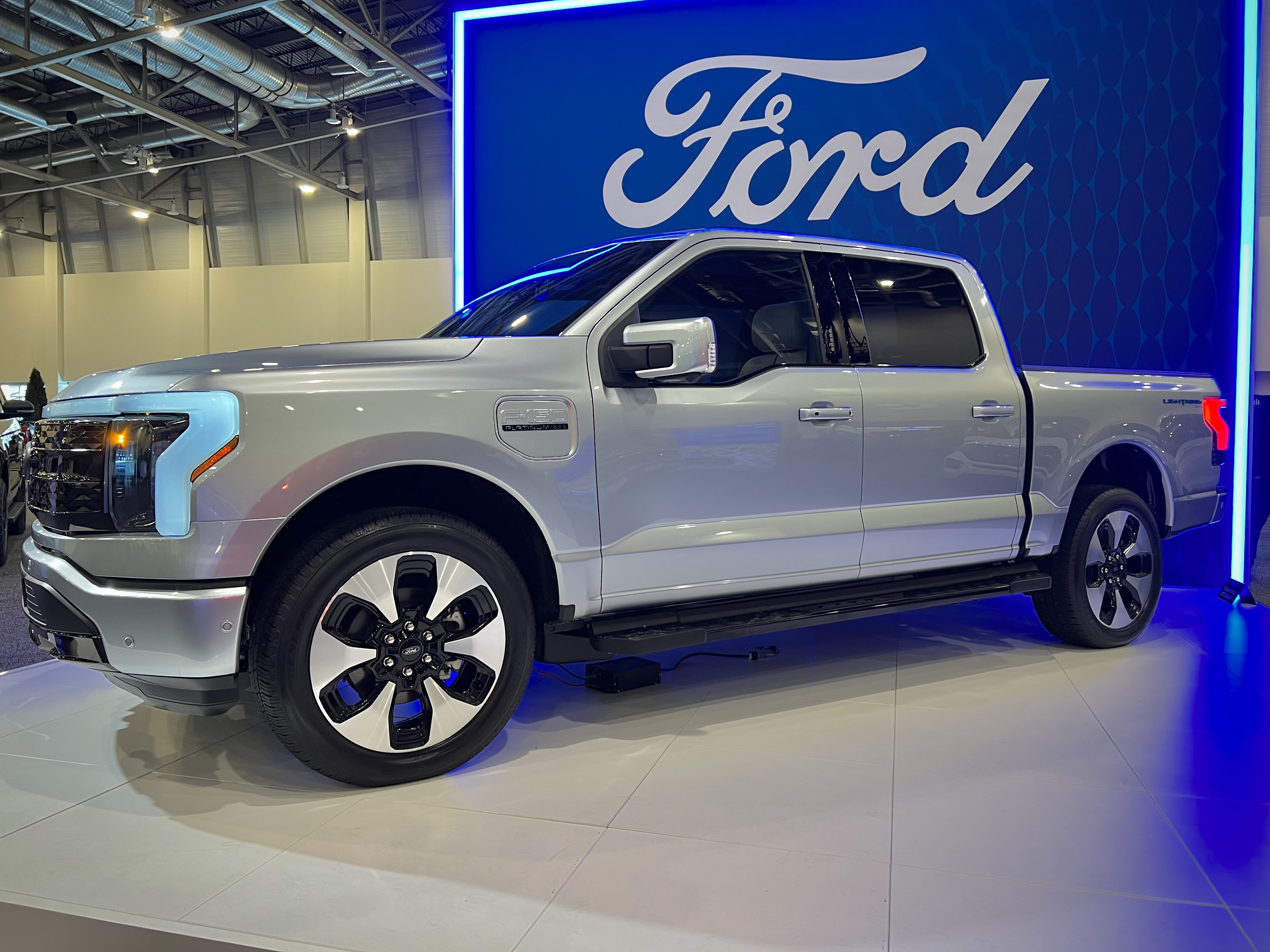
2023 Ford F-150 Lightning

Ford has produced trucks since 1908, beginning with the Ford Model TT, followed by the Model AA, and the Model BB. Countries where Ford commercial vehicles are or were formerly produced include Argentina, Australia, Brazil, Canada (also badged as Mercury), France, Germany, India, Netherlands, Philippines, Spain (badged Ebro too), Turkey, UK (badged also Fordson and Thames), and the United States.

From the 1940s to the late 1970s, Ford's Ford F-Series was used as the base for light trucks for the North American market.

Most of these ventures are now extinct. The European one that lasted longest was the lorries arm of Ford of Britain, which became part of the Iveco group in 1986. Ford had a minority share in the new company and Iveco took over sales and production of the Ford Cargo range. Ford's last significant European truck models were the Transcontinental and the Cargo. At the end of 1996, Ford sold the rights to its heavy trucks division to the Freightliner Trucks division of Daimler AG, with Ford producing the Cargo, Louisville, and Aeromax, through the 1998 model year. During the 1998 model year, Freightliner began production of its own versions of Ford-developed trucks in St. Thomas, Ontario, launching the Sterling truck brand. Slotted between Freightliner and Western Star, Sterling trucks were produced through 2009.

Line of heavy trucks made by Ford for the North American market:

- Ford F-Series
  - "Big Job" (1951–1957)
  - "Super Duty/Extra Heavy Duty (1958–1962)
- Ford N-Series (1963–1969)
- Ford L-Series trucks (1970–1998)
  - aka Ford "Louisville Line"
  - Ford Aeromax (1988–1998)
  - Ford Louisville (1996–1998)
  - Sterling (1998–2009)
- Ford C-Series (1957–1990)
- Ford Cargo/CF-Series (1986–1997)
- Ford H-Series (1961–1966)
  - aka "Two-story Falcon"
- Ford W-Series (1966–1977)
- Ford CL-Series (1978–1995)

For 1999, Ford briefly withdrew from production of medium-duty trucks. For the 2001 model year, the company entered into a joint venture with Navistar International (the supplier of diesel engines for 1-ton F-Series trucks), named Blue Diamond Truck Company LLC. As part of the joint venture, sharing a common truck chassis, the two companies would produce medium-duty (Class 6–7) trucks in a Navistar facility in Mexico, with each manufacturer supplying its own powertrain and bodywork, with the Ford F-650/F-750 Super Duty and International 4000/DuraStar sharing an assembly line. In 2006, the joint venture debuted the Ford LCF/International CityStar. Using a modified F-Series chassis adopted to fit a Mazda Titan cab, the LCF was a low-cab forward truck that was sold through 2009.

In Europe, Ford manufactures the Ford Transit jumbo van, which is classed as a Large Goods Vehicle and has a payload of up to 2,265 kg; there are options of a panel van, pickup or chassis cab. The Ford Transit is also available as a light van called the Ford Transit Connect and the Ford Ranger pickup is available.

=== Buses ===
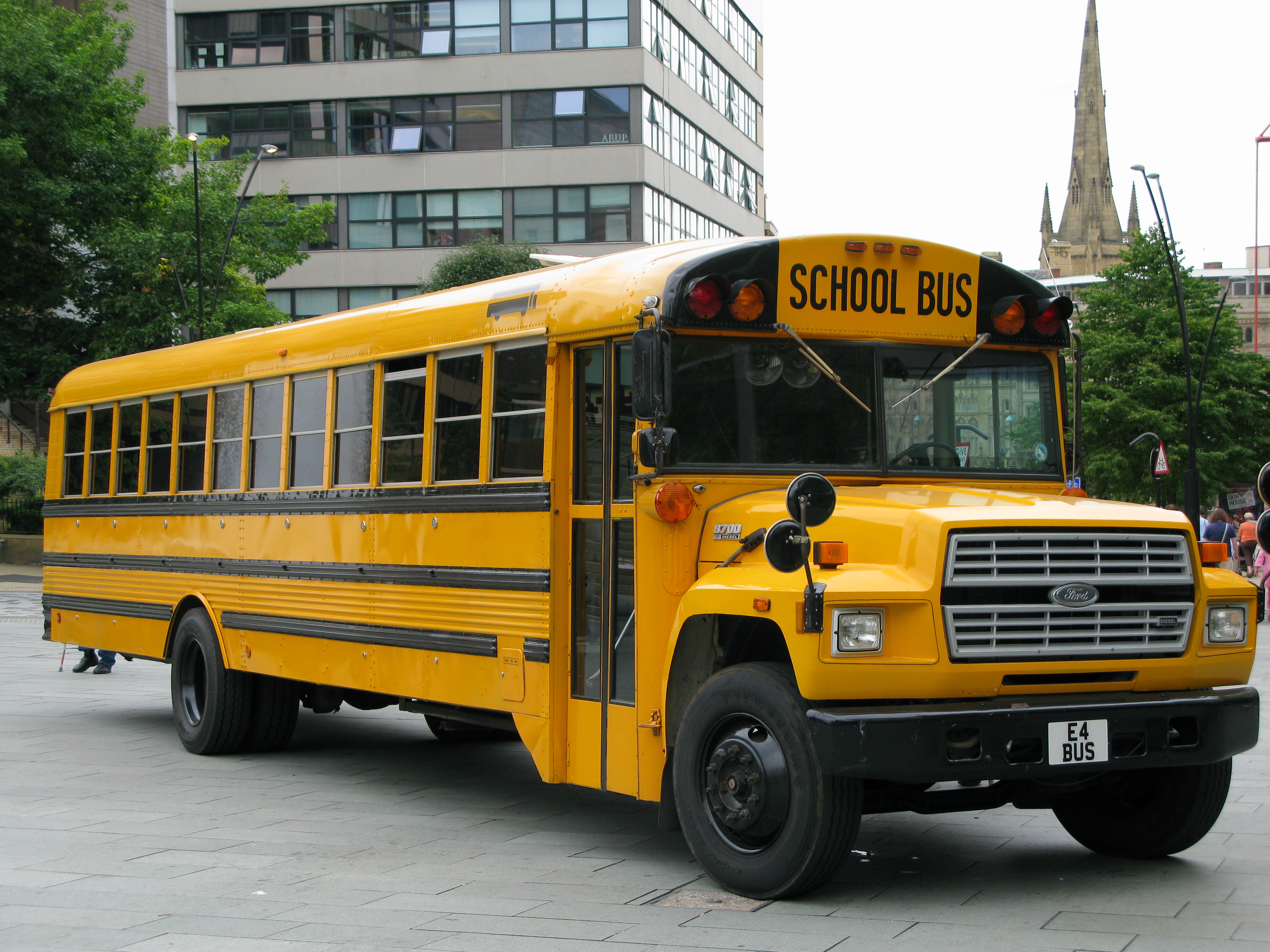
A Ford B700 bus chassis, with a body by Thomas Built

Ford manufactured complete buses in the company's early history, but today the role of the company has changed to that of a second stage manufacturer. In North America, the E-Series is still used as a chassis for small school buses and the F-650 is used in commercial bus markets. In the 1980s and 1990s, the medium-duty B700 was a popular chassis used by school bus body manufacturers including Thomas Built, Ward, and Blue Bird, but Ford lost its market share due to industry contraction and agreements between body manufacturers. Older bus models included:

Prior to 1936, Ford buses were based on truck bodies:

- Model B – 1930s
- Model T – 1920s
- F-105 school bus

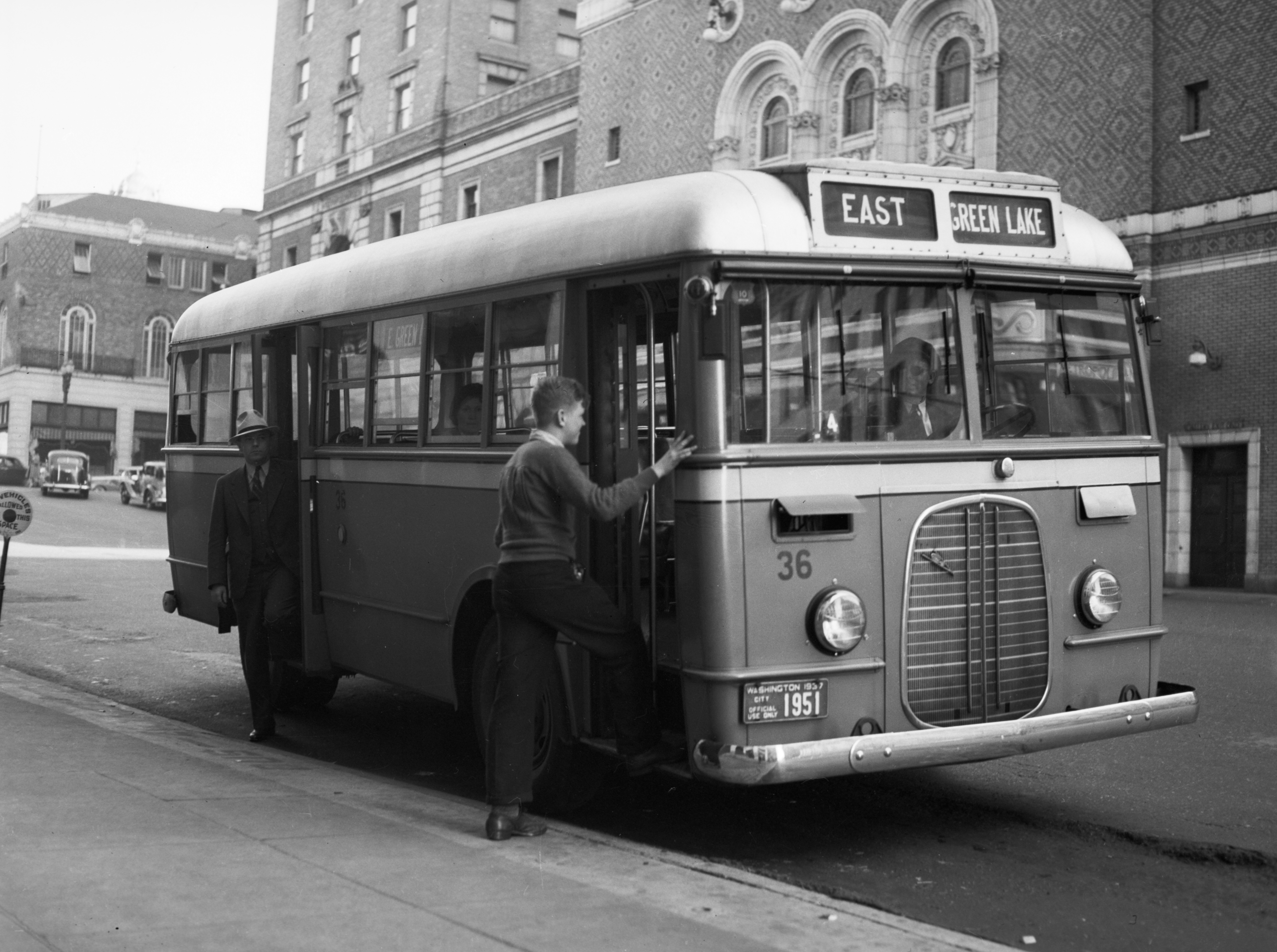
A 1937 Ford Transit Bus in Seattle

In 1936, Ford introduced the Ford Transit Bus, a series of small transit buses with bodies built by a second party. Originally a front-engine design, it was modified to a rear-engine design in 1939. About 1,000 to 1,200 of the original design were built, and around 12,500 of the rear-engine design, which was in production until 1947 (rebranded as the Universal Bus in 1946).

Rear-engine Transit Bus chassis model numbers:

- 09-B/19-B City transit bus – 1939–1941
- 19-B/29-B City transit bus – 1941–1942
- 49-B/79-B City transit bus – 1944–1947
- 69-B City transit bus – 1946–1947
- 29-B City transit bus – 1946–1947
- 72-T transit bus – 1944–1945

After 1946 the Transit City bus was sold as the Universal Bus with the roof changed from fabric/wood to all-metal:

- 79-B Universal transit bus – 1946–1947

Succeeding the Ford Transit Bus was the Ford 8M buses:

- 8MB transit bus – with Wayne Works 1948–?

Following World War II and from the 1950s onwards, Ford lost out to General Motors. This led to the end of transit buses for Ford in North America.

- B500 or B-series – 1950–1990s based on Ford F-series truck chassis used by school bus body manufacturers

In Europe, Ford manufactures the Ford Transit Minibus which is classed in Europe as a Passenger Carrying Vehicle and there are options of 12-, 15-, or 17-seaters. In the past, European models included:

- EM
- N-138
- D series buses (Australia)

=== Tractors ===
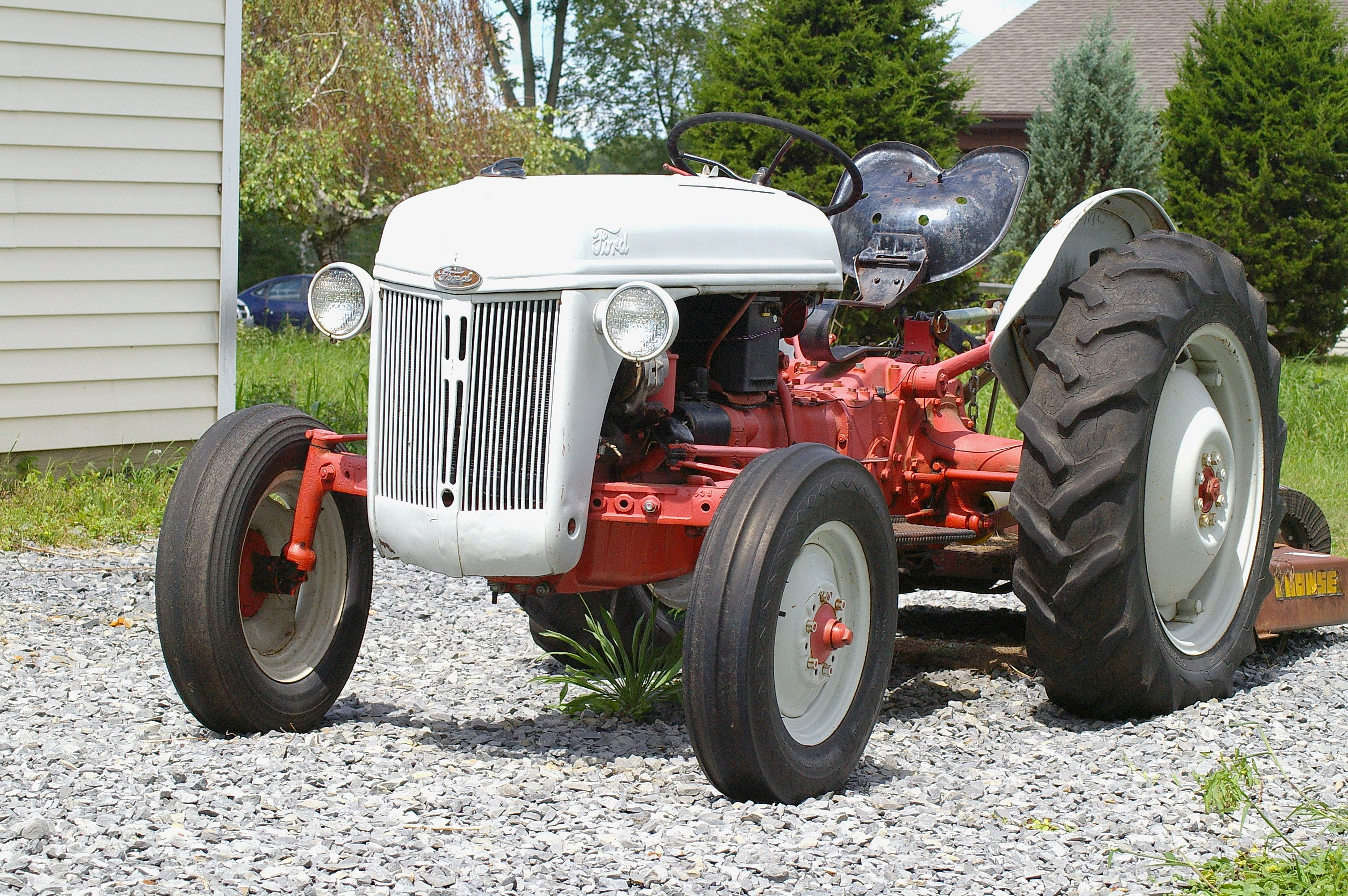
A Ford N series tractor

The "Henry Ford and Son Company" began making Fordson tractors in Henry's hometown of Springwells (later part of Dearborn), Michigan, from 1907 to 1928, from 1919 to 1932, at Cork, Ireland, and between 1933 and 1964 at Dagenham, England, later transferred to Basildon. They were also produced in Leningrad beginning in 1924.

Ford reentered the tractor market in 1939 with the Ford N-series tractors. The Ford 8N, introduced in 1947, became the most popular tractor of all time in North America. Production of the N line of models ended in 1952.

The Ford NAA tractor was introduced as an entirely new model in 1953. It was a replacement for the Ford N-Series tractors. Larger than the 8N, with a four-cylinder engine, and streamlined styling.

In 1986, Ford expanded its tractor business when it purchased the Sperry-New Holland skid-steer loader and hay baler, hay tools and implement company from Sperry Corporation and formed Ford-New Holland which bought out Versatile tractors in 1988. This company was bought by Fiat in 1991 and the name changed from Ford New Holland to New Holland. New Holland is now part of CNH Global.

=== Financial services ===
Ford offers automotive finance through Ford Motor Credit Company.

=== Automotive components ===
Ford's FoMoCo parts division sells aftermarket parts under the Motorcraft brand name. It has spun off its parts division under the name Visteon.

== Marques ==
=== Current marques ===
Origin	Marque	Estab.	Added	Markets
US	Ford	1903	1903	Global
US	Lincoln	1917	1922	North America, Middle East, China, South Korea
US	Motorcraft	1972	1972	Global

=== Former marques ===
Origin	Marque	Years	Markets	Fate
US	Autolite	1961–1973	Global	Sold to Bendix Corporation
US	Comet	1960–1961	North America	Merged with Mercury
US	Continental	1956–1986	North America	Discontinued
US	Edsel	1957–1960	North America	Discontinued
US	Fordson	1917–1964	North America, Ireland, U.K.	Discontinued
US	Mercury	1939–2011	North America, Middle East	Discontinued
US	Merkur	1985–1989	North America	Discontinued
CAN	Meteor	1949–1976	Canada	Discontinued
CAN	Monarch	1946–1961	Canada	Discontinued
CAN	Frontenac	1960	Canada	Discontinued
BRA	Troller	2007–2021	Brazil	Defunct company, plant closed by Ford Brasil
AUS	FPV	2002–2014	Australia	Discontinued
JPN	Mazda	1974–2015	Global	Sold shares
NOR	TH!NK	1999–2003	North America, Europe	Sold to Kamkorp
SWE	Volvo	1999–2010	Global	Sold to Geely
FRA	Matford	1934–1940	France	Joint venture with Mathis dissolved
ITA	De Tomaso	1971–1974	Global	Sold to Alejandro de Tomaso
ITA	Moto Guzzi	1973–1974	Global	Sold to Alejandro de Tomaso
ITA	Benelli	1972–1974	Global	Sold to Alejandro de Tomaso
UK	AC Cars	1986–1992	U.K.	50% stake sold to Autokraft
UK	Aston Martin	1989–2007	Global	Sold to a private consortium
UK	Jaguar	1989–2008	Global	Sold to Tata Motors
UK	Land Rover	2000–2008	Global	Sold to Tata Motors
UK	Thames	1939–1965	Europe, Canada	Discontinued

== Motorsport ==
=== FIA World Championships ===
Along with Shelby and Chevrolet, Ford is one of only three American constructors to win titles on the international scene at the FIA World Championships. As a constructor, Ford won the World Sportscar Championship three times: in 1966 (both sports prototype category and Grand Touring (GT) category), 1967 (GT category), and 1968 (sports prototype category). At the World Rally Championship Ford won 4 World Drivers' Championships (in 1979, 1981, 2017 and 2018) as well as 4 World Manufacturers' Championships (in 1979, 2006, 2007 and 2017). At the World Touring Car Championship Ford helped a Swiss team Eggenberger Motorsport win entrants' title in 1987. As an engine supplier, Ford also won 13 Formula One World Drivers' Championships and 10 Formula One World Constructors' Championships.

Ford is also one of only three constructors, alongside Mercedes-Benz and McLaren, to complete the Triple Crown of Motorsport (wins at the Indianapolis 500, 24 Hours of Le Mans, and Monaco Grand Prix), a feat that Ford achieved as an engine manufacturer by winning the 1968 Monaco Grand Prix.

=== Open-wheel racing ===
==== IndyCar ====
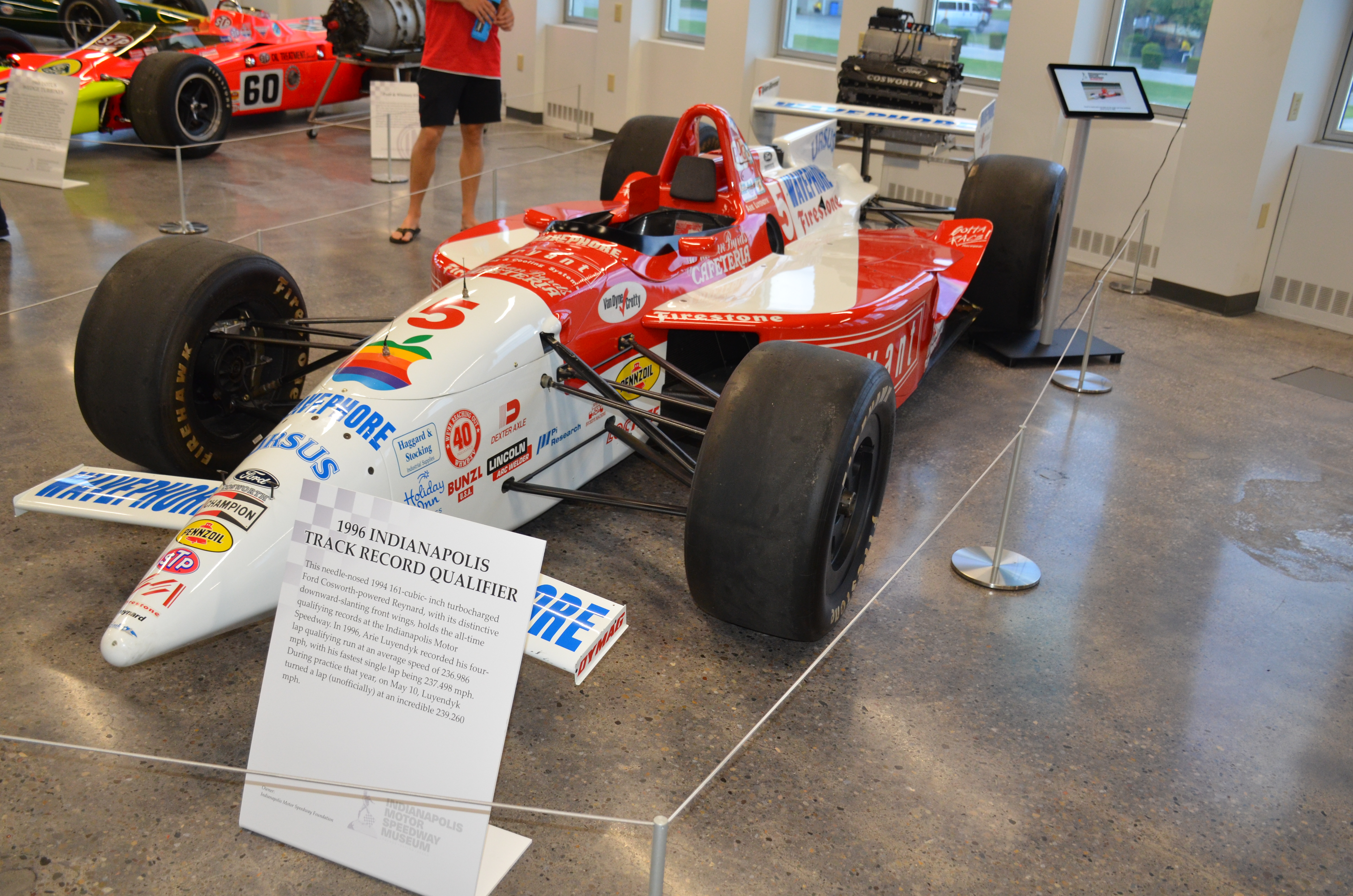
Arie Luyendyk's record-setting Ford Cosworth-powered IndyCar from 1996

IndyCars with Ford engines first competed in 1935 using a production-based Ford V8 in the Miller-Ford racer. A pushrod Ford V8 raced with Lotus in 1963, and Ford's first Indy win was in 1965 with a DOHC V8. Ford motors, including the Ford-sponsored DFX engine developed by Cosworth, have won the Indianapolis 500 eighteen times. On May 12, 1996, Arie Luyendyk, while driving an IndyCar powered by a Ford Cosworth XB engine, broke the Indianapolis 500 records for fastest qualification lap (237.498 mph; 382.216 km/h) and fastest qualification four-lap average (236.986 mph; 381.392 km/h). These speed records still stand as of 2022.

==== Formula Ford ====
Formula Ford, conceived in the UK in 1966, is an entry-level type of formula racing with wingless single-seater cars. Many of today's formula racing drivers started their car racing careers in this category.

==== Formula One ====
Ford was heavily involved in Formula One for many years and supplied engines to a large number of teams from 1967 until 2004. These engines were designed and manufactured by Cosworth, the racing division that was owned by Ford from 1998 to 2004. Ford-badged engines won 176 Grands Prix between 1967 and 2003 for teams such as Team Lotus and McLaren. Ford entered Formula One as a constructor in 2000 under the Jaguar Racing name, after buying the Stewart Grand Prix team which had been its primary 'works' team in the series since 1997. Jaguar achieved little success in Formula One, and after a turbulent five seasons, Ford withdrew from the category after the 2004 season, selling both Jaguar Racing (which became Red Bull Racing) and Cosworth (to Gerald Forsythe and Kevin Kalkhoven).

Ford has announced that it will return to Formula One in 2026 following a partnership with Red Bull Powertrains, supplying power units to Red Bull Racing and its second team Racing Bulls.

=== Stock car racing ===
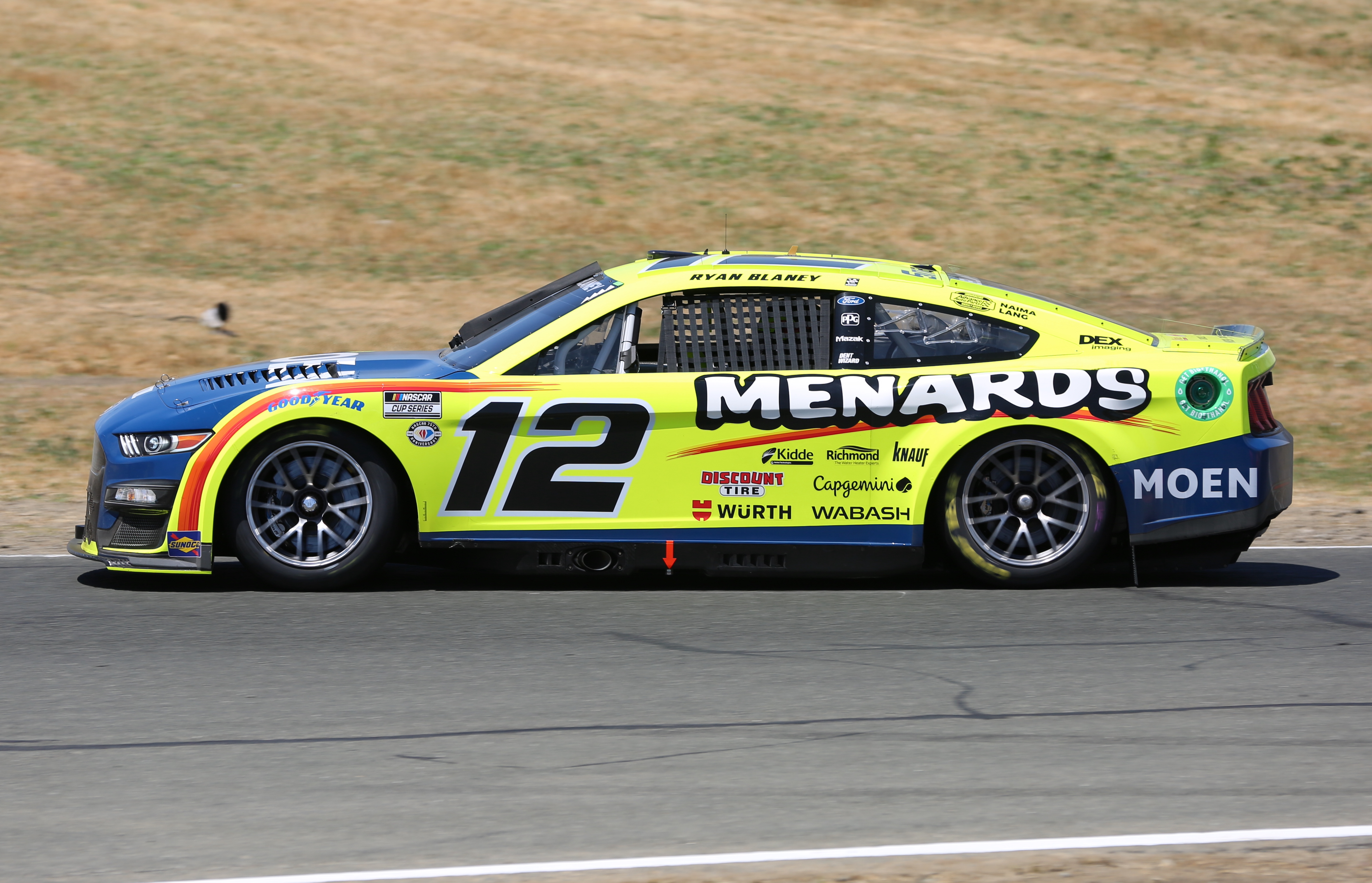
Ryan Blaney's No. 12 car at Sonoma Raceway in 2023

Ford is one of three manufacturers in NASCAR's three major series: the Cup Series, Xfinity Series, and Truck Series. Major teams include RFK Racing, Team Penske and Wood Brothers Racing. Ford is represented by the Mustang GT in the Cup Series, and the Xfinity Series and by the F-150 in the Truck Series. Some of the most successful NASCAR Fords were the aerodynamic fastback Ford Torino, Ford Torino Talladega, Mercury Cyclone Spoiler II, and Mercury Montegos, and the aero-era Ford Thunderbirds. The Ford nameplate has won eight manufacturer's championships in the Cup Series while Mercury has won one. In the Cup Series, Ford earned its 1,000th victory in the 2013 Quicken Loans 400 at Michigan International Speedway. The Ford Fusion is also used in the ARCA Menards Series.

=== Rally ===
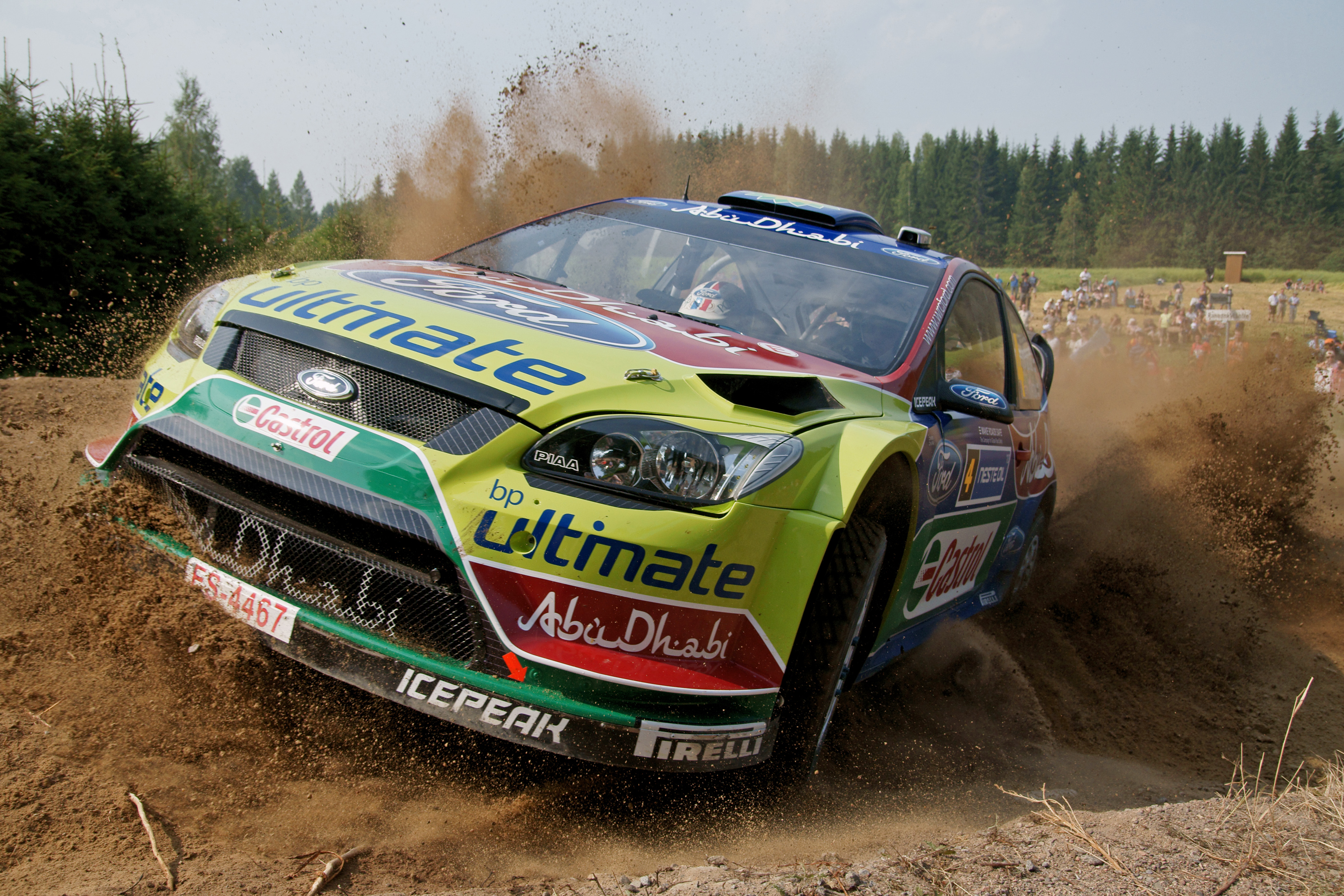
Jari-Matti Latvala driving the Ford Focus RS WRC 09 in 2010

Ford has a long history in rallying and has been active in the World Rally Championship since the beginning of the world championship, the 1973 season. Ford took the 1979 manufacturers' title with Hannu Mikkola, Björn Waldegård, and Ari Vatanen driving the Ford Escort RS1800. In the Group B era, Ford achieved success with Ford RS200. Since the 1999 season, Ford has used various versions of the Ford Focus WRC to much success. In the 2006 season, BP-Ford World Rally Team secured Ford its second manufacturers' title, with the Focus RS WRC 06 built by M-Sport and driven by "Flying Finns" Marcus Grönholm and Mikko Hirvonen. Continuing with Grönholm and Hirvonen, Ford successfully defended the manufacturers' world championship in the 2007 season. Ford is the only manufacturer to score in the points for 92 consecutive races; since the 2002 season opener Monte Carlo Rally.

In March 1951, the Henri Loos and Henri Berney broke the cross-Africa record of the Algiers-Cape Town Rally with a 1950 Ford V8, from Cape Town to Paris.

=== Rallycross ===
Ford has competed in rallycross with its Ford Fiesta and Ford Focus. Tanner Foust won the Global RallyCross Championship in 2011 and 2012 and was runner-up in the FIA European Rallycross Championship in 2011 and 2012. Toomas Heikkinen won the Global RallyCross Championship title in 2013 and Joni Wiman won it in 2014. Other notable Ford drivers include Marcus Grönholm, Ken Block, and Brian Deegan.

=== Sports cars ===
Ford sports cars have been visible in the world of sports car racing since 1964. Most notably the Ford GT40 won the 24 Hours of Le Mans four times (in 1966, 1967, 1968 and 1969) and is the only American car to ever win overall at this prestigious event. Ford also won four titles at the World Sportscar Championship with the GT40. Swiss team Matech GT Racing, in collaboration with Ford Racing, opened a new chapter with the Ford GT, winning the Teams title in the 2008 FIA GT3 European Championship.

==== Ford Mustang ====
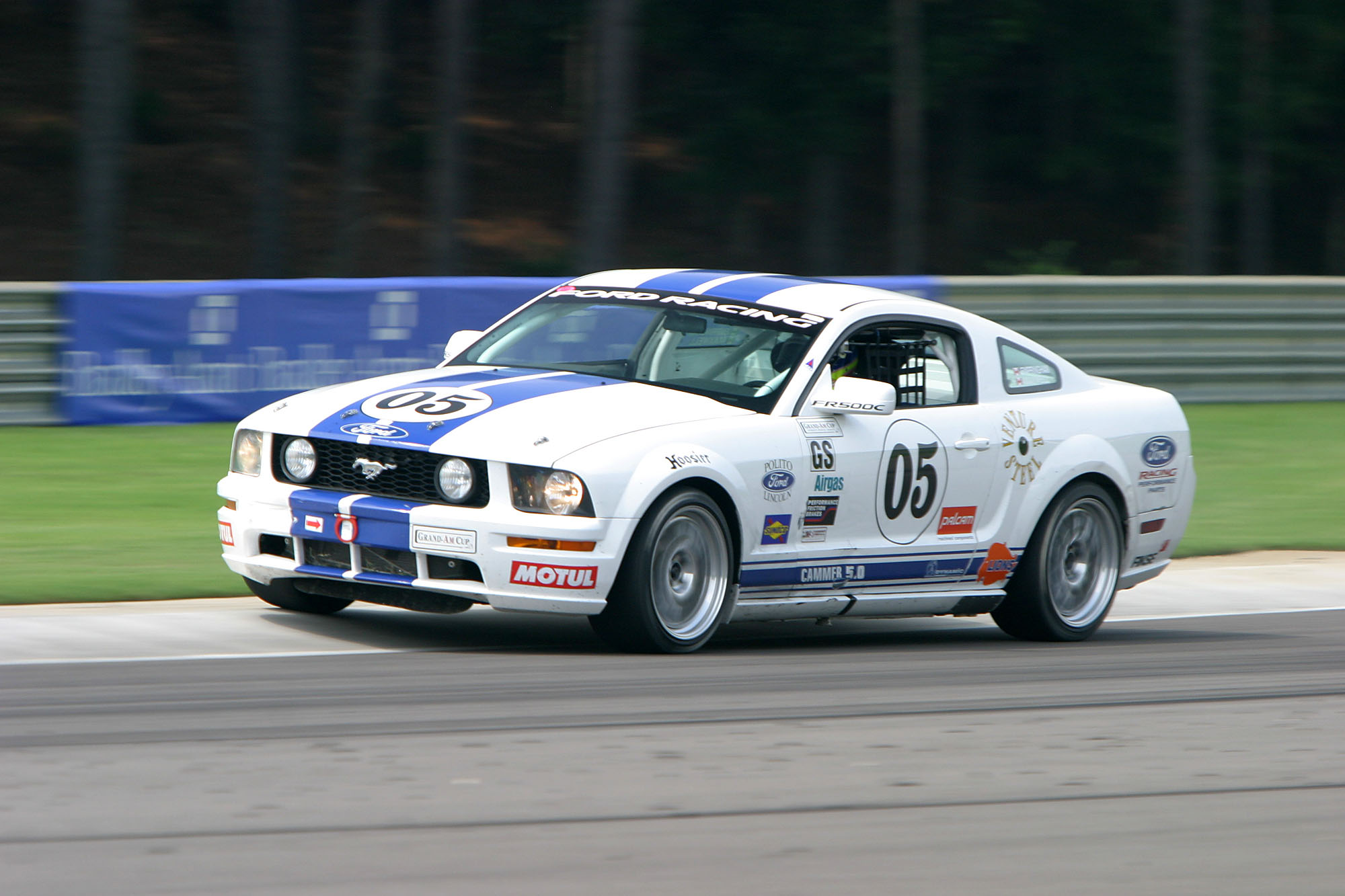
A GT racing version of the Ford Mustang, competing in the Koni Challenge in 2005

The Ford Mustang has arguably been Ford's most successful sports car. Jerry Titus won the 1965 SCCA Pro B National Championship with a Mustang and the model went on to earn Ford the SCCA Trans-Am Championship title in both 1966 and 1967. Ford won the Trans-Am Championship again in 1970 with Parnelli Jones and George Follmer driving Boss 302 Mustangs for Bud Moore Engineering. Ford took the 1985 and 1986 IMSA GTO Championship with Mustangs driven by John Jones and Scott Pruett before returning to Trans-Am glory with a championship in 1989 with Dorsey Schroeder. Ford dominated Trans-Am in the 1990s with Tommy Kendall winning championships in 1993, 1995, 1996, and 1997 with Paul Gentilozzi adding yet another title in 1999. In 2005 the Ford Mustang FR500C took the championship in the Rolex Koni Challenge Series in its first year on the circuit. In 2007, Ford added a victory in the GT4 European Championship. 2008 was the first year of the Mustang Challenge for the Miller Cup, a series that pits a full field of identical factory-built Ford Mustang race cars against each other. Also, in 2008, Ford won the manufacturers championship in the Koni Challenge Series and HyperSport drivers Joe Foster and Steve Maxwell won the drivers title in a Mustang GT.

Ford and Michelin teamed up to provide custom-engineered tires for the Ford Performance vehicle lineup. Ford Performance director Dave Pericak said: "That confidence extends from our upcoming racing effort at Le Mans in 2016 with the all-new Ford GT, to the Ford Performance vehicle lineup, including the Shelby GT350 and F-150 Raptor".

=== Touring cars ===
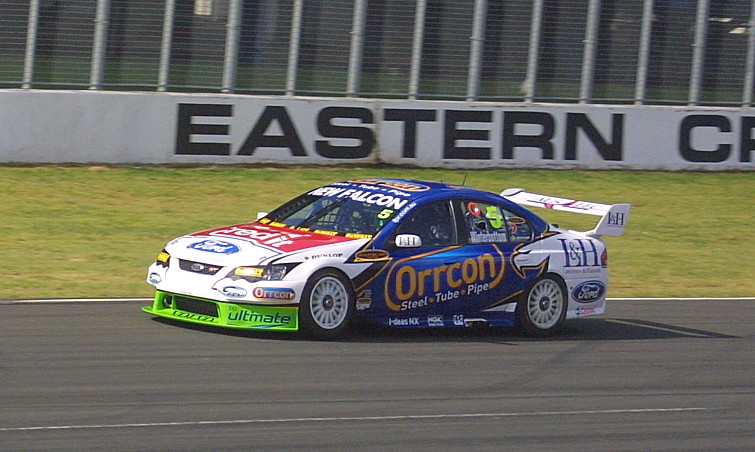
Ford Performance Racing Ford Falcon V8 Supercar at Eastern Creek in Australia in 2008

Ford has campaigned touring cars such as the Mustang, Focus, Falcon, and Contour/Mondeo and the Sierra Cosworth in many different series throughout the years. Notably, Mondeo drivers finished 1, 2, and 3 in the 2000 British Touring Car Championship and Falcon drivers placed 1, 2, and 3 in the 2005 V8 Supercar Championship Series.

=== Drag racing ===
In drag racing, John Force Racing drivers John Force, Tony Pedregon, and Robert Hight have piloted Ford Mustang Funny Cars to several NHRA titles in recent seasons. Teammates Tim Wilkerson and Bob Tasca III also drive Mustangs in Funny Car.

=== Drifting ===
Ford has branched out into drifting with the introduction of the new model Mustang. Most noticeable is the Turquoise and Blue Falken Tires Mustang driven by Vaughn Gittin, Jr. that produces 750 hp (560 kW).

== Environmental initiatives ==
=== Flexible fuel vehicles ===
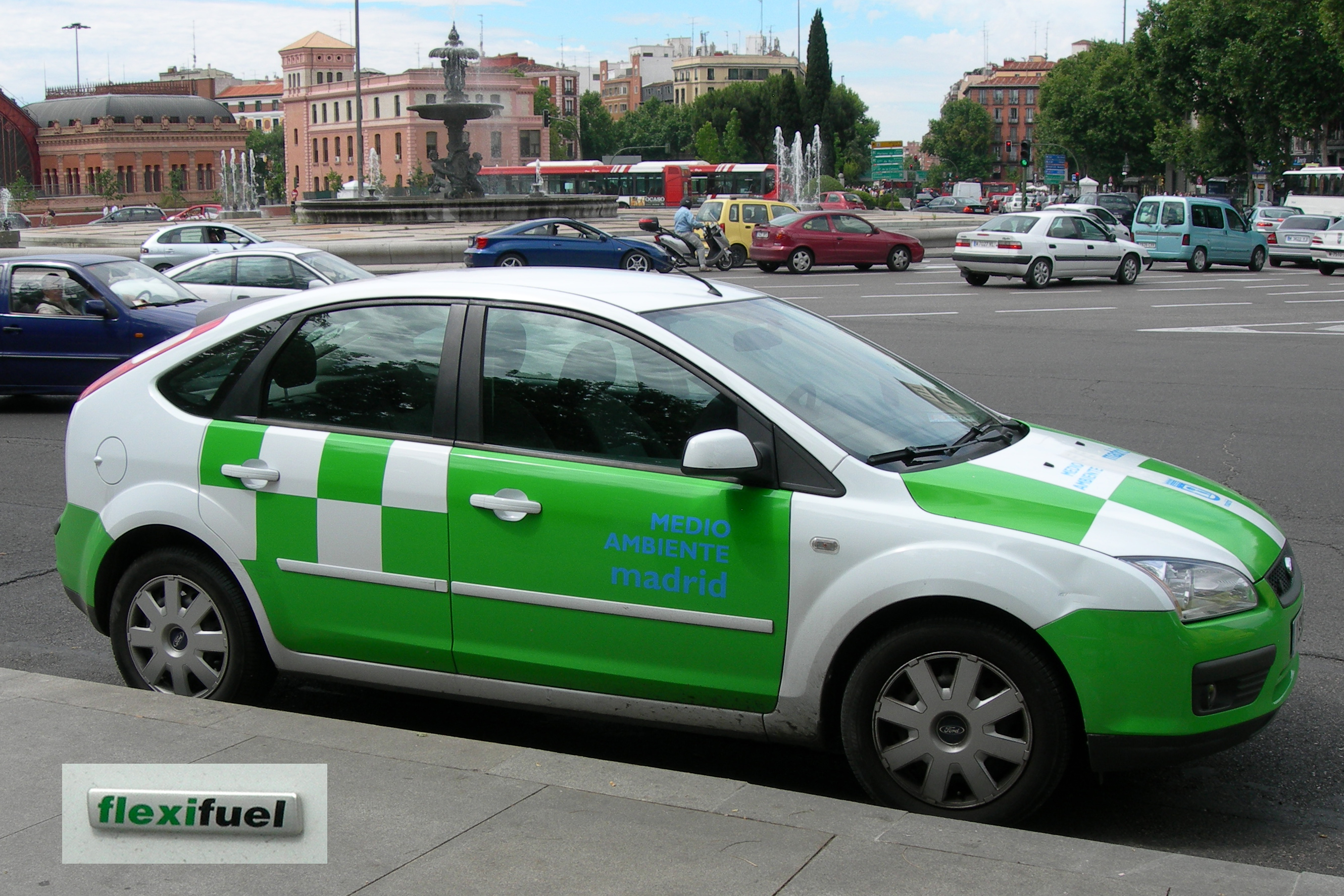
The Ford Focus Flexifuel was the first E85 flexible fuel vehicle commercially available in the European market.

Flexible fuel vehicles are designed to operate smoothly using a wide range of available ethanol fuel mixtures—from pure gasoline to bioethanol-gasoline blends such as E85 (85% ethanol and 15% gasoline) or E100 (neat hydrous ethanol) in Brazil. Part of the challenge of successful marketing alternative and flexible fuel vehicles in the U.S. is the general lack of establishment of sufficient fueling stations, which would be essential for these vehicles to be attractive to a wide range of consumers. Significant efforts to ramp up production and distribution of E85 fuels are underway and expanding.

=== Electric drive vehicles ===
==== Hybrid electric vehicles ====
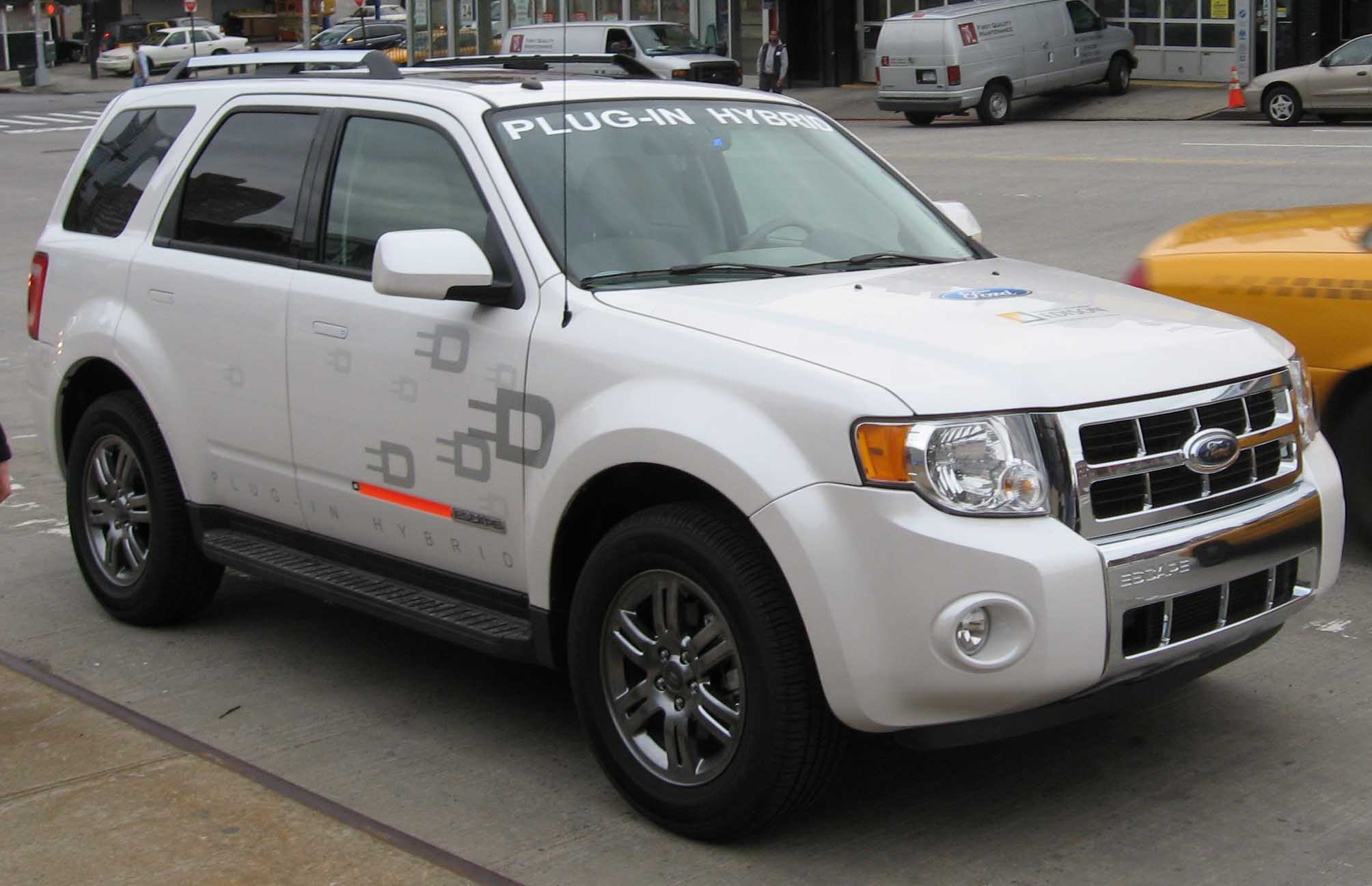
Ford Escape plug-in hybrid test vehicle

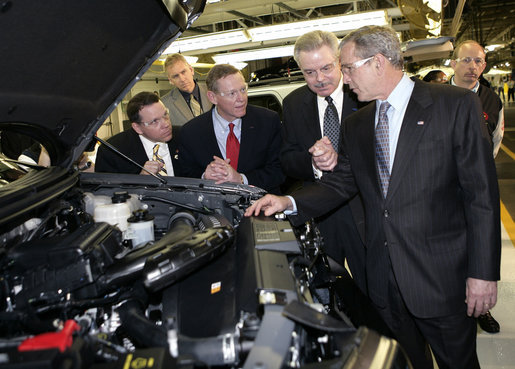
Alan Mulally (wearing red tie) with then-President George W. Bush at the Kansas City Assembly plant in Claycomo, Missouri, on March 20, 2007, touting Ford's new hybrid cars

In 2004, Ford and Toyota agreed a patent-sharing accord that granted Ford access to certain hybrid technology patented by Toyota; in exchange, Ford licensed some of its own patents to Toyota. In 2004, Ford introduced the Escape Hybrid. With this vehicle, Ford was third to the automotive market with a hybrid electric vehicle and the first hybrid electric SUV to market. This was also the first hybrid electric vehicle with a flexible fuel capability to run on E85. The Escape's platform mate Mercury Mariner was also available with the hybrid-electric system in the 2006 model year—a full year ahead of schedule. The similar Mazda Tribute will also receive a hybrid-electric powertrain option, along with many other vehicles in the Ford vehicle line.

In 2005, Ford announced a goal to make 250,000 hybrids a year by 2010, but by mid-2006 announced that it would not meet that goal, due to excessively high costs and the lack of sufficient supplies of the hybrid-electric batteries and drivetrain system components. Instead, Ford has committed to accelerating development of next-generation hybrid-electric power plants in Britain, in collaboration with Volvo. This engineering study is expected to yield more than 100 new hybrid-electric vehicle models and derivatives.

In September 2007, Ford announced a partnership with Southern California Edison (SCE) to examine how plug-in hybrids will work with the electrical grid. Under the multimillion-dollar, multi-year project, Ford will convert a demonstration fleet of Ford Escape Hybrids into plug-in hybrids, and SCE will evaluate how the vehicles might interact with the home and the utility's electrical grid. Some of the vehicles will be evaluated "in typical customer settings", according to Ford.

On June 12, 2008, USDOE expanded its own fleet of alternative fuel and advanced technology vehicles with the addition of a Ford Escape Plug-In Hybrid Flex-Fuel Vehicle. The vehicle is equipped with a 10-kilowatt (13 hp) lithium-ion battery supplied by Johnson Controls-Saft that stores enough electric energy to drive up to 30 miles (48 km) at speeds of up to 40 mph (64 km/h). In March 2009, Ford launched hybrid versions of the Ford Fusion Hybrid and the Mercury Milan Hybrid in the United States, both as 2010 models.

As of November 2014, Ford has produced for retail sales the following hybrid electric vehicles: Ford Escape Hybrid (2004–2012), Mercury Mariner Hybrid (2005–2010), Mercury Milan Hybrid (2009–2010), Ford Fusion Hybrid (2009–present), Lincoln MKZ Hybrid (2010–present), Ford C-Max Hybrid (2012–present), and Ford Mondeo Hybrid (2014–present). By June 2012, Ford had sold 200,000 full hybrids in the U.S. since 2004, and, as of September 2014, the carmaker has sold over 344,000 hybrids in the United States. The top selling hybrids in the U.S. market are the Fusion Hybrid with 127,572 units, followed by Escape Hybrid with 117,997 units, and the C-Max Hybrid with 54,236. As of November 2014, Ford is the world's second-largest manufacturer of hybrids after Toyota Motor Corporation, with 400,000 hybrid electric vehicles produced since their introduction in 2004.

==== Plug-in electric vehicles ====
As of April 2024, Ford currently produces the following plug-in electric vehicles: the Ford Escape/Kuga PHEV, Ford Ranger PHEV, Ford Mustang Mach-E, Ford F-150 Lightning, Ford Explorer EV (Europe), Ford E-Transit/Tourneo Courier, Ford E-Transit Custom and the Ford E-Transit.

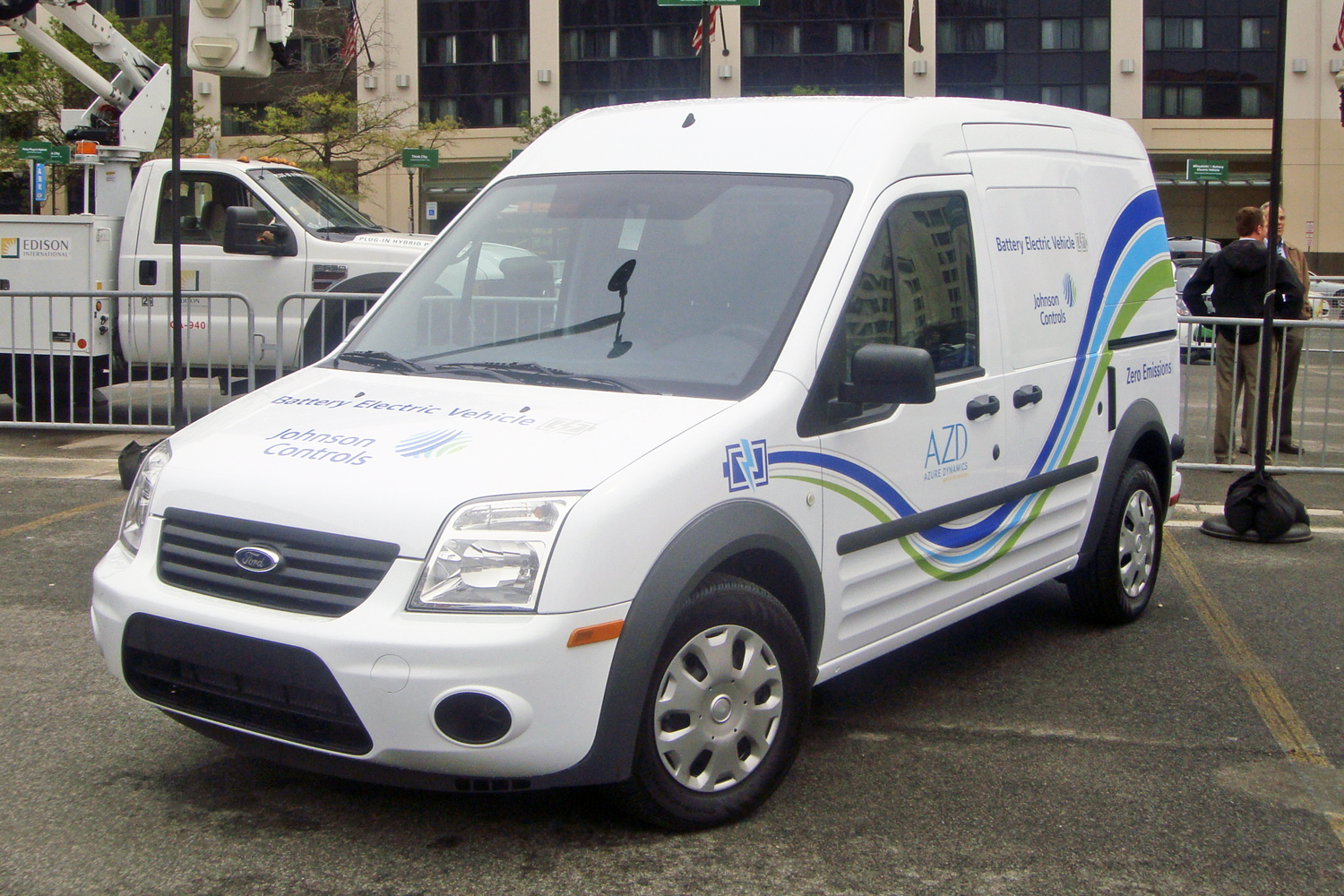
The Azure Transit Connect Electric was produced between 2010 and 2012 as a collaboration between Azure Dynamics and Ford Motor Company.

Bill Ford was one of the first top industry executives to make regular use of a battery electric vehicle, a Ford Ranger EV, while the company contracted with the United States Postal Service to deliver electric postal vans based on the Ranger EV platform. Ford discontinued a line of electric Ranger pickup trucks and ordered them destroyed, though it reversed in January 2005, after environmentalist protest. The all-electric pickup truck leased 205 units to individuals and 1,500 units to fleets in the U.S. from 1998 to 2002.

From 2009 to 2011, Ford offered the Ford TH!NK car. Ford ended production and ordered all the cars repossessed and destroyed, even as many of the people leasing them begged to be able to buy the cars from Ford. After an outcry from the lessees and activists in the U.S. and Norway, Ford returned the cars to Norway for sale. Four hundred and forty units were leased in the U.S. from 1999 until 2003.

In 2017, Ford CEO Mark Fields announced that the company would invest $4.5 billion in further development of plug-in electric vehicles by 2020.

The 2010–2012 Azure Transit Connect Electric is an all-electric van that was developed as a collaboration between Azure Dynamics and Ford Motor Company, but Azure was the official manufacturer of record.

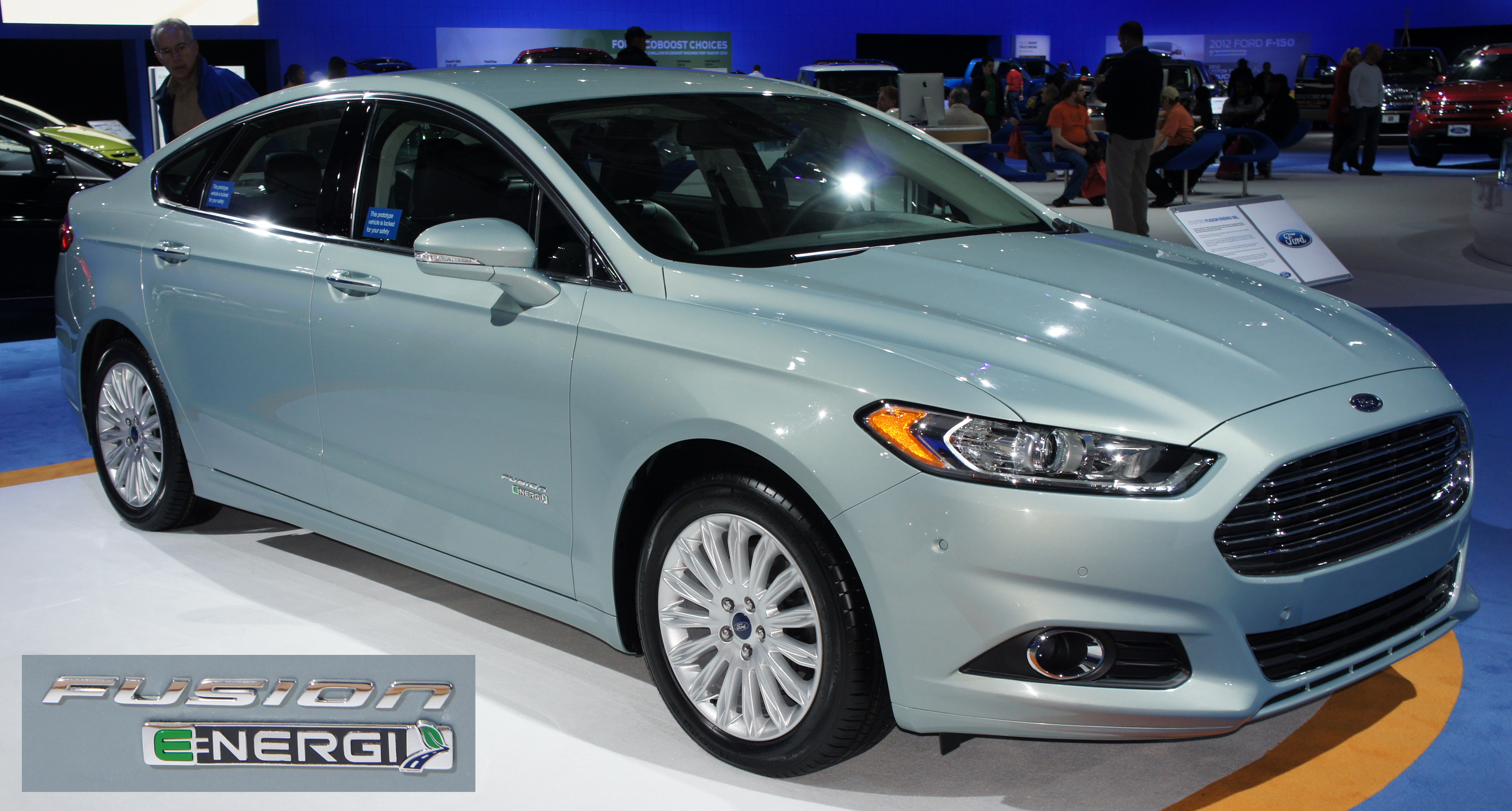
The Ford Fusion Energi plug-in hybrid shares its powertrain with the Ford C-Max Energi.

The 2011–2018 Ford Focus Electric is based on the third-generation Focus internal combustion vehicle, converted to an all-electric propulsion system as a production electric car by Magna International, and retail sales began in the U.S. in December 2011.

The 2012–2017 Ford C-Max Energi is a plug-in hybrid released in the U.S. in October 2012. It is followed by the Ford Fusion Energi that was produced in 2013–2020. Both Energi models share the same powertrain technology.

In October 2017, Ford announced its Team Edison battery electric vehicle group to lead the company's renewed efforts into the EV market, which had plans for a small 300-mile range SUV by 2020. The new team will be headquartered in Detroit and have offices in Europe and Asia.

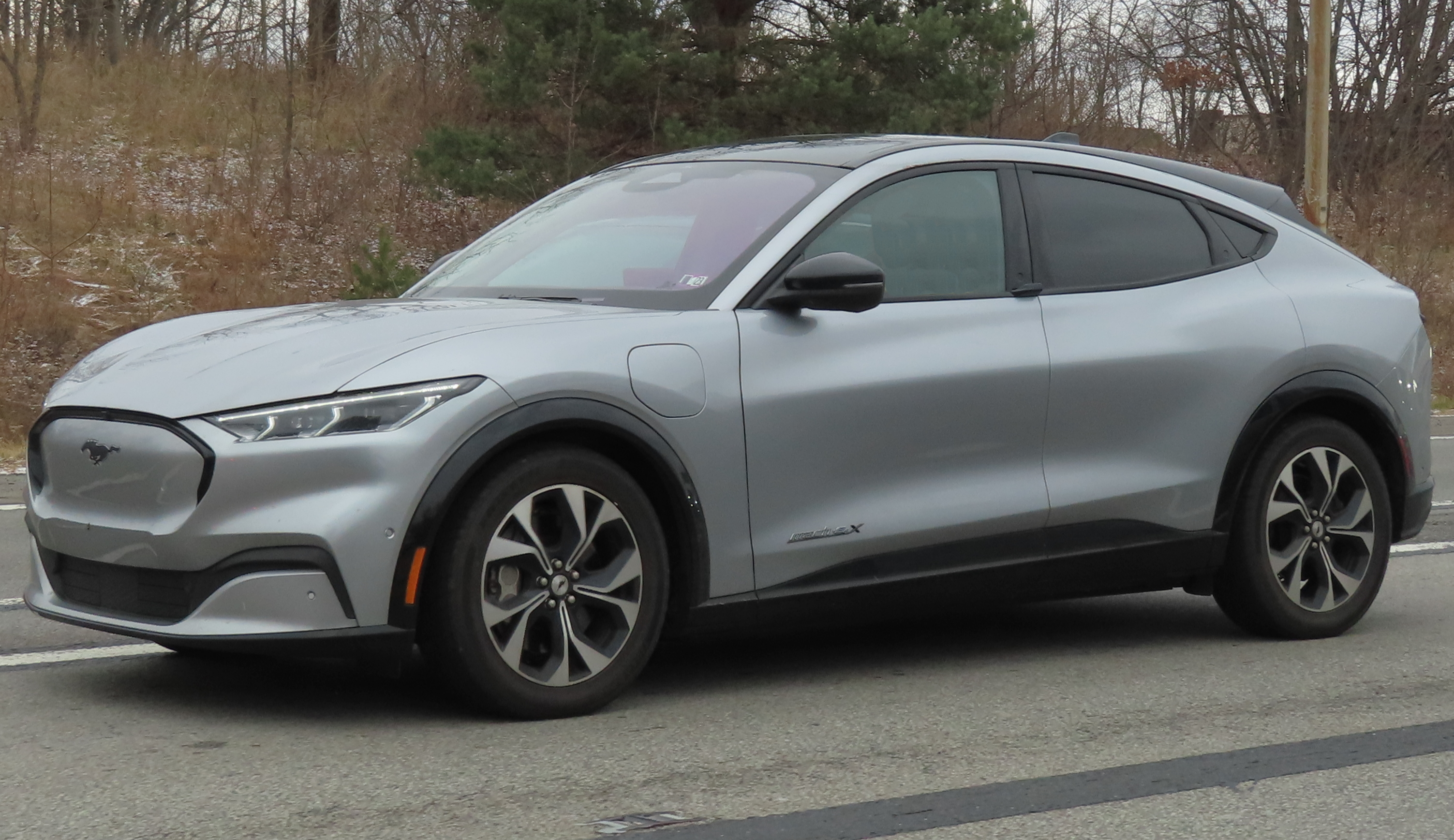
Ford Mustang Mach-E

On November 17, 2019, the Mustang Mach-E was introduced which later went on sale December 2020 as a 2021 model. The Mustang Mach-E is assembled at Cuautitlán Assembly in Cuautitlán Izcalli, Mexico. According to former Ford CEO Jim Hackett, assembling the vehicle in Mexico allows Ford to make a profit from the first vehicle, unlike other electric vehicles. In June 2022, the CFO of Ford announced that the Mustang Mach-E was no longer profitable due to increases in the cost of raw materials.

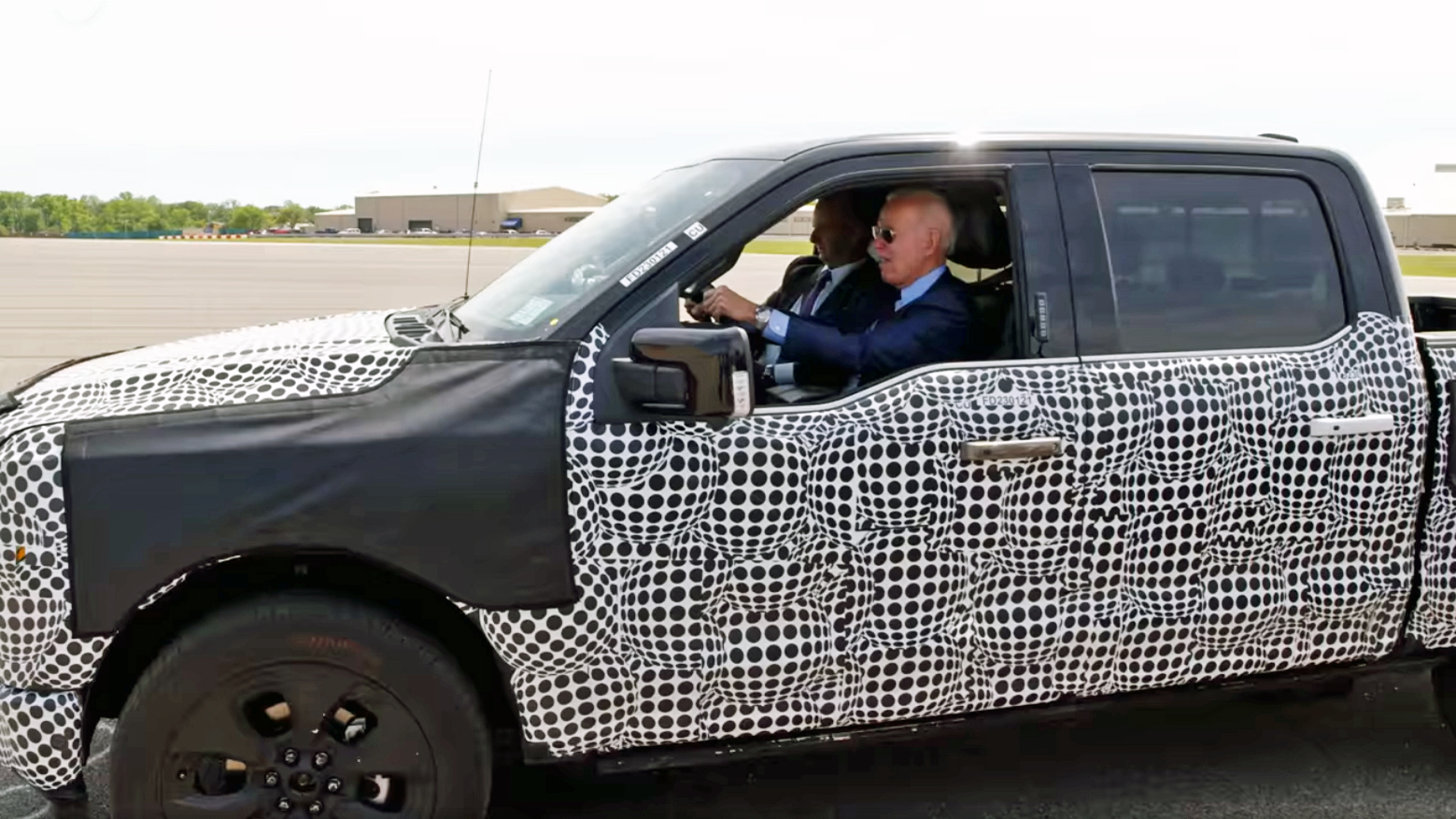
President Joe Biden test driving the F-150 Lightning prototype at Ford's Rouge Electric Vehicle Center, Dearborn, Michigan.

On May 19, 2021, Ford revealed a new electric pickup truck, the F-150 Lightning. The first F-150 Lightning was manufactured on April 18, 2022, with first delivery in the US on May 26. Ford adjusted its 2024 production plans for the F-150 Lightning, cutting them in half from an anticipated 3,200 weekly units to around 1,600 weekly units due to sales below expectations. In 2022, Ford began manufacturing its E-Transit electric cargo vans at its plant in Kansas City, Missouri.

As the result of 2019 Ford-VW global alliance cooperation agreement, Ford began developing electric vehicles for the European market using the Volkswagen Group MEB platform along with batteries supplied by Volkswagen. The first Ford product based on the MEB is the Ford Explorer EV, which was introduced in March 2023. It is produced in the Cologne plant in Germany, which previously manufactured the Fiesta small car. In August 2023, Ford delayed the Explorer EV deliveries to 2024 due to new battery regulations.

In March 2022, Ford increased its focus in battery electric vehicles by establishing Ford Model E, a division for Ford's electric vehicle business. Ford Model E is expected to be profitable by 2026, and the company said the division "should be seen as a startup". In June 2022, Ford announced its intention to restructure its dealership model, including building an e-commerce platform where customers can buy electric vehicles at non-negotiable prices in an effort to match Tesla"s profit margins. Ford also stated in June 2022 that it planned to spend $3.7 billion to hire 6,200 union workers to staff several assembly plants in Michigan, Ohio and Missouri in a bid to sell 2 million electric vehicles annually by 2026.

In May 2023, Ford announced its plans to integrate the North American Charging System (NACS) system into their electric vehicles, following Tesla's decision to open and rename its proprietary charging standard to NACS. Newly built Ford electric vehicles after 2024 will have native NACS charging ports on the vehicle. Existing Ford electric models will be able to connect to the NACS system and its chargers by use of an adapter. Both will thus have access to the extensive NACS charging network with more than 12,000 chargers in North America.

==== 2025 investment ====
In August 2025, Ford announced that it was investing almost $5 billion to produce lower-cost EV products. $2 billion will be directed towards its Louisville factory to develop lower-cost electric vehicle components as well as a new "assembly tree" manufacturing process. Rather than one long conveyor, three subassembly lines will operate simultaneously and then converge together. The first vehicle from the Louisville factory is set to launch in 2027 and will be a medium, four-door pickup truck at a starting price of $30,000. The Louisville location will also stop production of the Ford Escape and Lincoln Corsair by 2026. Meanwhile, $3 billion is intended to build a new battery plant in Michigan. The announcement follows Ford's electric vehicle division losing $12 billion over the last two and a half years, including $2.2 billion in the first half of 2025. Low utilization of the battery factories motivated Ford to create a new division for containerized grid batteries in 2026.

=== Hydrogen ===
Ford also continues to study fuel cell-powered electric powertrains and has demonstrated hydrogen-fueled internal combustion engine technologies, as well as developing the next-generation hybrid-electric systems. Compared with conventional vehicles, hybrid vehicles and fuel cell vehicles decrease air pollution emissions as well as sound levels with favorable impacts upon respiratory health and decrease of noise health effects.

Ford has launched the production of hydrogen-powered shuttle buses, using hydrogen instead of gasoline in a standard internal combustion engine, for use at airports and convention centers. At the 2006 Greater Los Angeles Auto Show, Ford showcased a hydrogen fuel cell version of its Explorer SUV. The Fuel cell Explorer has a combined output of 174 hp (130 kW). It has a large hydrogen storage tank which is situated in the center of the car taking the original place of the conventional model's automatic transmission. The centered position of the tank assists the vehicle reach a notable range of 350 miles (563 km), the farthest for a fuel cell vehicle so far. The fuel cell Explorer the first in a series of prototypes partly funded by the United States Department of Energy to expand efforts to determine the feasibility of hydrogen-powered vehicles. The fuel cell Explorer is one of several vehicles with green technology being featured at the L.A. show, including the 2008 Ford Escape Hybrid, PZEV emissions compliant Fusion and Focus models and a 2008 Ford F-Series Super Duty outfitted with Ford's clean diesel technology.

=== Increased fuel efficiency ===
In July 2008, Ford Motor Company announced that it would accelerate its plans to produce more fuel-efficient cars, changing both its North American manufacturing plans and its lineup of vehicles available in the United States. In terms of North American manufacturing, the company planned to convert three existing pickup truck and sport utility vehicle (SUV) plants for small car production, with the first conversion at its Michigan Truck Plant. In addition, Ford's assembly plants near Mexico City, Mexico, and in Louisville, Kentucky, were to be converted from pickups and SUVs to small cars, including the Ford Fiesta, by 2011. Ford then also planned to introduce to North America six of its European small vehicles, including two versions of the Ford Fiesta, by the end of 2012.

Ford of Europe developed the ECOnetic programme to address the market and legislative need for higher fuel efficiency and lower CO_{2} emissions. As opposed to the hybrid engine technology used in competitor products such as the Toyota Prius, ECOnetic improves existing technology. Using lower-consuming Duratorq TDCi diesel engines, and based on a combination of improved aerodynamics, lower resistance, and improved efficiency, the Ford Fiesta was the lowest-emitting mass-produced car in Europe while the 2012 Ford Focus ECOnetic will have better fuel consumption than the Prius or the Volkswagen Golf BlueMotion. ECOnetic is not presently planned to be sold in North American due to current perceived lower consumer demand.

Ford has challenged University teams to create a vehicle that is simple, durable, lightweight, and comes equipped with a base target price of only $7,000. The students from Aachen University created the "2015 Ford Model T".

In 2000, under the leadership of the current Ford chairman, William Clay Ford, the company announced a planned 25 percent improvement in the average mileage of its SUVs—to be completed by the 2005 calendar year. In 2003, Ford announced that competitive market conditions and technological and cost challenges would prevent the company from achieving this goal.

For the 2007 model year, Ford had thirteen U.S. models that achieve 30 miles per gallon or better (based on the highway fuel economy estimates of the EPA) and several of Ford's vehicles were recognized in the EPA and Department of Energy Fuel Economy Guide for best-in-class fuel economy. Ford claimed to have eliminated nearly three million pounds of smog-forming emissions from its U.S. cars and light trucks over the 2004 to 2006 model years. However, the United States Environmental Protection Agency has linked Ford to 54 Superfund toxic waste sites, twelve of which have been cleaned up and deleted from the list.

=== Efficient buildings ===
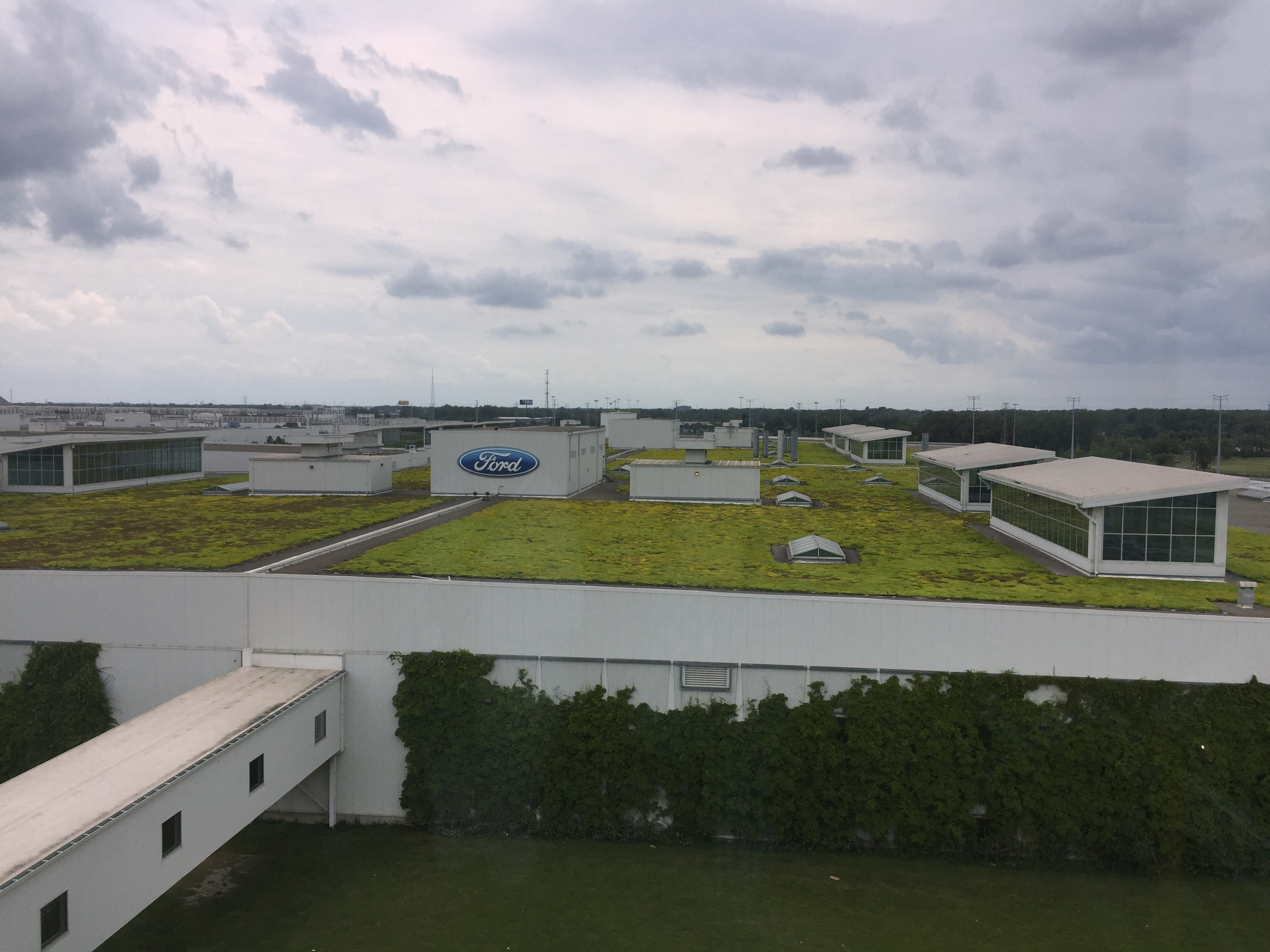
Green roof that covers part of the Ford River Rouge Complex.

As part of a renovation of the Ford River Rouge Complex, in 2010 Ford unveiled a 10.4-acre (42,000 m^{2}) living roof covering part of the Dearborn Truck plant, consisting of sedum, a low-growing groundcover. The sedum retains and cleanses rainwater and moderates the internal temperature of the building, saving energy.

In 2016, Ford announced a ten-year renovation plan for its Dearborn campus. The plan features consolidation of office and lab spaces in to fewer and much larger buildings, which will be built to LEED standards, and will feature extensive use of wetlands and park spaces. The new campus features new multi-story parking decks with solar power-generating roofs, and a new natural gas power plant. The DTE Ford Central Energy Plant is a 34MW combined heat-and-power plant which features a high efficiency design and LEED Gold buildings.

== Sponsorships ==
Ford sponsors numerous events and sports facilities around the U.S., most notably the Ford Center in downtown Evansville, Indiana, and Ford Field in downtown Detroit.

The company has also been a major sponsor of the UEFA Champions League for over two decades, and is also a longtime sponsor of the Sky media channel's coverage of Premier League football.

Between 1994 and 1999, Ford was the main kit sponsor of German Bundesliga club 1. FC Köln.

== Sales numbers ==
Calendar Year	US sales	Market share of US sales	Worldwide wholesales (thousands)
1997	3,877,458	25.0%	
1998	3,922,604	24.5%	
1999	4,163,369	23.9%	
2000	4,202,820	23.6%	
2001	3,971,364	22.7%	
2002	3,623,709	21.2%	
2003	3,483,719	20.5%	
2004	3,331,676	19.3%	
2005	3,153,875	18.1%	
2006	2,901,090	17.0%	
2007	2,507,366	15.2%	
2008	1,988,376	14.7%	
2009	1,620,888	15.3%	
2010	1,935,462	16.4%	
2011	2,143,101	16.4%	
2012	2,250,165	15.2%	
2013	2,493,918	15.7%	
2014	2,480,942	14.7%	
2015	2,613,162	14.6%	
2016	2,614,697	14.6%	
2017	2,586,715	14.7%	
2018	2,497,318	14.1%	
2019	2,422,698	13.8%	
2020	2,044,744	13.7%	4,187
2021	1,905,955	12.4%	3,924
2022	1,864,464	13.1%	4,231
2023	1,995,912	12.4%	4,413
2024	2,078,832	12.6%	4,470

== See also ==
- The Henry Ford, museum
- Chariot (company)
- Detroit Automobile Company
- Dodge v. Ford Motor Company
- Firestone and Ford tire controversy
- List of automobile manufacturers of the United States
- List of automotive manufacturers by production
