= Solo 401(k) =

Type of retirement plan in the United States

A Solo 401(k) (also known as a Self Employed 401(k) or Individual 401(k)) is a 401(k) qualified retirement plan for Americans that was designed specifically for employers with no full-time employees other than the business owner(s) and their spouse(s). The general 401(k) plan gives employees an incentive to save for retirement by allowing them to designate funds as 401(k) funds and thus not have to pay taxes on them until the employee reaches retirement age. In this plan, both the employee and his/her employer may make contributions to the plan. The Solo 401(k) is unique because it only covers the business owner(s) and their spouse(s), thus, not subjecting the 401(k) plan to the complex ERISA (Employee Retirement Income Security Act of 1974) rules, which sets minimum standards for employer pension plans with non-owner employees. Self-employed workers who qualify for the Solo 401(k) can receive the same tax benefits as in a general 401(k) plan, but without the employer being subject to the complexities of ERISA.

== History ==
Prior to 2001, self-employed workers were limited to a profit sharing retirement plan that did not include any employee deferral options in contrast to a multiple employer 401(k) Plan. There existed a retirement platform unique to self-employed workers, the SEP IRA and the Keogh plan, but it lacked many of the benefits of the typical corporate 401(k) platform, such as employee deferral. Congress remedied this situation in 2001 with the passing of the Economic Growth and Tax Relief Reconciliation Act (EGTRRA). Although EGTRRA was primarily known for its tax reductions, it also amended tax law to allow for self-employed individuals to access a 401(k) style retirement platform. This platform became popularly known as the Solo 401(k).

== Qualifications ==
In order to qualify for a Solo 401(k), an individual must claim some self-employed income. However, he/she does not need to work full-time in a self-employed capacity. A common example of part-time self-employed income is an individual who works for an employer, but also does a little consulting on the side. The consulting income would be considered self-employed income, thereby rendering the individual's business eligible for adopting a Solo 401(k). A Solo 401(k) Plan can be adopted by any self-employed business, including a sole proprietorship, limited liability company, partnership, C-Corporation, S-Corporation, etc.

The business adopting the Solo 401(k) Plan must also not employ any full-time employees that are eligible to participate in the plan, other than the business partners and their spouses. A full-time employee is generally defined as one who works at least 1,000 hours per year for his/her employer. Certain employees may be excluded from plan eligibility, such as those under age 21, non-resident aliens, and union members for which retirement benefits were the subject of a collective bargaining agreement.

== Types ==
The two basic types of Solo 401(k) plans are brokerage based and self-directed, also known as a "checkbook control" Solo 401(k). The type of plan is based on the plan documents. The basic plan documents state and control the operations of the plan, and the adoption agreement offers the employer the ability to customize the plan based on the options available in the basic plan. In other words, the options available to an adopting employer and its plan participant(s) would be based on the options available in the basic plan document and plan adoption agreement. A plan sponsor - the company offering the plan to the employer - would typically offer either an individually designed Solo 401(k) Plan or a prototype plan.

Brokerage-based plan documents usually limit the available investment options and offer market-based assets, such as stocks and mutual funds, while self-directed plan documents generally offer more investment options and often allow for alternative assets, such as real estate and private business, as well as include a loan feature and Roth deferrals. Investors typically choose between the two plans based on their investment goals, asset preference, fee schedules, and desired level of control.

While a brokerage-based Solo 401(k) plan and self-directed Solo 401(k) plan would both be considered a qualified retirement plan, the options available under these plans as per the Plan Adoption Agreement generally differ in a number of ways:

- The self-directed Solo 401(k) Plan typically allows for greater investment options than a brokerage-based Solo 401(k) Plan, including real estate, precious metals, private loans, cryptocurrencies, and private business investments. The only investments not allowed by law are "collectibles" as defined in §408(m) of the IRC.
- Unlike a brokerage-based Solo 401(k) Plan, a self-directed Solo 401(k) Plan will typically offer a loan feature, which will allow the plan participant to borrow the lesser of $50,000 or 50% of their account value and use the loan for any purpose. If a Solo 401(k) plan allows loans, the participant can borrow any amount that is in their designated Roth account, including amounts that rolled over into that account as an in-plan Roth rollover.
- Unlike a brokerage-based Solo 401K Plan, a self-directed Solo 401(k) Plan contains a built in Roth sub-account which can be contributed to without any income restrictions. In addition, most brokerage Solo 401K Plans do not allow for the conversion of a traditional 401(k) or 403(b) account to a Roth subaccount.
- The self-directed Solo 401(k) Plan will allow the adopting employer to open the plan account at most local banks in order to obtain check writing ability as well as have a brokerage account.

== Contribution limits ==
The contribution limits for the Solo 401(k) are the same as a standard ERISA 401(k). They are broken down into a profit sharing contribution which comes from the employer, and a salary deferral contribution which comes from the employee. However, due to the fact that in a Solo 401(k) the plan holder is acting both as employer and employee, the actual percentages assume a more meaningful role. If the plan holder is filing as a Sole Proprietor or Single Member LLC (which is true in most cases), then the limit is capped at 20% of the self-employed income plus $19,000 for 2019, a $500 increase from 2018. Internal Revenue Code Section 401(a)(3) states that the amount of employer contributions is limited to 25 percent of the entity's income subject to self-employment tax. Schedule C sole-proprietors must do an added calculation starting with earned income to determine their maximum contribution, which, in effect, brings the maximum 25% of compensation limit down to 20% of earned income. A step-by-step worksheet for this calculation can be found in IRS Publication 560.

If the plan holder is 50 years or older, then he/she may contribute an additional $6,000 for 2019, the same as 2017, on top of the standard contribution. This additional contribution is often referred to as a catch-up contribution. Note this additional catch-up contribution does not apply to the SEP IRA. Calculating one's maximum annual solo 401(k) contribution limitation, including employee deferrals and profit sharing contributions, is based on self-employment income or W-2 income earned by the plan participant and the adopting employer's established legal entity (sole proprietorship vs. "C" corporation). In other words, in the case of a "C" or "S" corporation, the employee deferral and profit sharing contribution is based on the individual plan participant's W-2 amount.

In both cases, the IRS has declared an upper limit for total employer and employee contributions to a plan —the IRS Section 415(c) limit— which may not be exceeded. As of 2019, this upper limit is $56,000 for those under 50, $1,000 more than 2018, and $62,000 for those 50 and older, $1,000 more than 2018. If an individual is eligible to contribute to the 401(k) plans of multiple unrelated employers, employee deferral contributions can be made to each plan but cannot exceed the annual limitation when taking contributions to all plans in the aggregate. The maximum total contribution limit is per qualified plan. as per this example from IRS publication "Retirement Topics - 401(k) and Profit-Sharing Plan Contribution Limits" "Example 1: Greg, 46, is employed by an employer with a 401(k) plan and he also works as an independent contractor for an unrelated business. Greg sets up a solo 401(k) plan for his independent contracting business. Greg contributes the maximum amount to his employer's 401(k) plan for 2019, $19,000. Greg would also like to contribute the maximum amount to his solo 401(k) plan. He is not able to make further elective deferrals to his solo 401(k) plan because he has already contributed his personal maximum, $19,000. He has enough earned income from his business to contribute the overall maximum for the year, $56,000. Greg can make an after-tax contribution of $56,000 to his solo 401(k) plan. This limit is not reduced by the elective deferrals under his employer's plan because the limit on annual additions applies to each plan separately."

The employee deferral contribution can be made in both pre-tax, after-tax or Roth, so long as the plan documents allow for it. The employer profit sharing contributions must be made in pre-tax form.

Thanks to the American Taxpayer Relief Act of 2012, if the plan documents allow it, any vested plan balance, including Solo 401(k) plan employee deferrals and employer profit sharing contributions, as well as earnings, can be rolled over to a designated Roth account, even if these amounts can't be distributed to the participant. The purpose behind the relaxation of the in-plan Roth rollover rules is to encourage plan participants to do Roth conversions and thereby increase the amount of current tax revenues collected by the Treasury. If the Solo 401(k) plan documents allows them, an in-plan Roth rollover can be done as either a direct or 60-day rollover. For a direct rollover, the plan trustee transfers the non-Roth amount to a designated Roth account in the same plan. In-plan Roth rollovers of amounts not normally distributable must be accomplished via a direct rollover. For a 60-day rollover, the plan distributes an eligible rollover distribution from the non-Roth account; the participant then deposits all or part of that distribution into a designated Roth account in the same plan within 60 days.

The in-plan Roth rollover is treated as taxable income (fair market value minus the basis in the distribution) and the Roth rollover must be reported in the participant's gross income for the tax year in which is it received. There is no income tax withholding required on an in-plan Roth direct rollover. However, if a distribution is received, the plan must withhold 20% federal income tax on the untaxed amount even if the distribution is rolled over to a designated Roth account within 60 days.

For a sole proprietorship, or an LLC taxed as a sole proprietorship, the deadline for depositing salary deferrals into the Solo 401k, as well as the deadline to fund the profit sharing contribution, is the personal tax filing deadline April 15 (or October 15 if an extension was filed).

For a partnership, or an LLC taxed as a partnership, the deadline for depositing salary deferrals into the Solo 401k, as well as the deadline to fund the profit sharing contribution, is the partnership tax filing date of March 15 (or September 15 if an extension was filed).

== Tax implications ==
The Solo 401(k) is an IRS Qualified Retirement Plan which means that it shares the same tax benefits as other QRPs. A qualified retirement plan is a plan that meets requirements of the Internal Revenue Code and as a result, is eligible to receive certain tax benefits. For a Traditional Solo 401(k), the income contributed into the plan is tax deferred. The concept of tax deferral is premised on the notion that all income and gains generated by the pre-tax retirement account investment would generally flow back into the retirement account tax-free. Instead of paying tax on the returns of a self-directed IRA investment, such as real estate, tax is paid only at a later date, leaving the investment to grow unhindered. For example, if an IRA investor invested $100,000 into a Self-Directed IRA LLC in 2012 and the account earns $10,000 in 2012, the investor would not owe tax on that $10,000 in 2012. Instead, the self-directed IRA investor would be required to pay the taxes when he or she withdraws the money from the IRA, which could be many years later. For example, assuming the IRA investor mentioned above is in a 33% federal income tax bracket, she would have had to pay $3,333 in federal income taxes on the $10,000 earned on the IRA in 2012. That would have left $6,667 in the account. At an 8% annual return, those earnings would go on to produce $533.36 in 2013. However, because IRAs are tax deferred, the self-directed IRA investor is able to earn a return on the full $10,000 rather than the $533.36 she would have had if she had to pay taxes that year. At an 8% annual return, she'd earn $800 in 2013. The primary benefit of tax deferral is that the deferral compounds each year. Tax deferred investments though a self-directed IRA LLC generally help investors generate higher returns. That's because the money that would normally be used for tax payments is instead allowed to remain in the account and earn a return.

Tax responsibility doesn't start until retirement age as the plan holder begins to take out Required Minimum Distributions (RMDs). The tax bracket is determined at the time that the distributions are taken. For a Roth Solo 401(k), the funds go in as post-tax dollars and thus are no longer subject to taxation, assuming the distribution would be treated as a qualified distribution. For a distribution to be qualified, it must occur at least five years after the Roth Solo 401(k) Plan participant established and funded his/her first Roth 401(k) plan account, and the distribution must occur under at least one of the following conditions:

- The Roth 401(k) Plan participant is at least age 59.5 when the distribution occurs.
- The distributed assets are used toward the purchase, or to build or rebuild a first home for the Roth 401(k) Plan participant or a qualified family member. Qualified family members include the Roth 401(k) Plan participant's spouse, a child of the Roth 401(k) Plan participant and/or of the Roth 401(k) Plan participant's spouse, a grandchild of the Roth 401(k) Plan participant and/or of his or her spouse, a parent or other ancestor of the Roth 401(k) Plan participant and/or of his or her spouse. This is limited to $10,000 per lifetime.
- The distribution occurs after the Roth 401(k) Plan participant becomes disabled.
- The assets are distributed to the beneficiary of the Roth 401(k) Plan participant after the Roth 401(k) Plan participant's death.

If a plan holder is using his/her Solo 401(k) funds to invest in an active business held through a passthrough entity, such as a limited liability company or partnership, then there is the possibility of Unrelated Business Income Tax (UBIT or UBTI). This is a tax that is levied on tax exempt entities, such as a charity, IRA, or 401(k) Plan, that have invested in an active trade or business unrelated to its exempt purpose. The net profits allocated to the tax-exempt entity from the active trade or business held through a passthrough entity are subject to UBIT on a yearly basis. The UBTI is reported on the IRS Form 990-T. Most investments entered into by retirement plans, however, are not considered active businesses, and therefore are not subject to UBIT.

The tax forms that apply to a Solo 401(k) can vary according to the assets and size of the plan. Here is a listing of the most common:

- IRS Form 5500-EZ - Solo 401(k) plans that have assets in excess of $250,000 need to file IRS form 5500-EZ. This filing is for reporting purposes only and does not require any payments.
- Form 1040 - If the plan has less than $250K of assets, (which means there is no IRS Form 5500-EZ filing requirement), then employee deferral contributions are reported on their annual income tax return (1040 line 28) as adjusted income for QRP contribution. Employer Profit sharing contributions would be reported on IRS Form 1040, Schedule C for a self-employed individual (and on the corporate tax return for an employer corporation).
- Form 1099-R - Form 1099-R needs to be filed when a distribution is taken from the Solo 401(k), or when an In-Plan Roth conversion is performed. The reported distributions will be taxable unless the distributions are after-tax funds.
- Form 990-T - If the Solo 401(k) had Unrelated Business Income during the previous year, it must file form 990-T to report and pay the amount of UBIT that is due.

== Differences from a SEP IRA ==
Although both the Solo 401(k) and SEP IRA function as a retirement vehicle for self-employed individuals, the Solo 401(k) offers a number of features not found in the SEP.

- It is easier to contribute the maximum amount in a Solo 401(k) because of the Salary Deferral component of $18,500 in 2018, which is not available with a SEP IRA.
- A Solo 401(k) Plan includes a $6000 catch-up contribution for plan participants over the age of 50, which is not the case for a SEP IRA.
- A Solo 401(k) Plan can offer the owner Roth contributions, even in the case where the owner is otherwise not eligible to contribute to a Roth IRA due to the Roth's annual income limitation.
- Unlike an IRA, a special custodian is not required to be used. Most Solo 401(k) Plans can be structured as trustee directed plans, hence, the 401(k) plan account can generally be opened at any local bank and most financial institutions. This allows for faster and more economical transactions.
- The Solo 401(k) allows for a personal loan up to $50,000 or 50% account of the plan participant's account value, whatever is less.
- The Solo 401(k) is not required to pay UDFI on leveraged real estate, assuming the loan satisfied the rules under Internal Revenue Code Section 514.
- Prohibited Transactions can be fixed in a Solo 401(k), while in a SEP IRA a Prohibited Transaction will often lead to the liquidation of the plan.
- Unlike a SEP IRA, after tax contributions may be made to Solo 401k plans. The solo 401k after tax contributions can also be converted to Roth solo 401k designated funds. The conversion of after tax funds held in 401k plans such as solo 401k plans came as a result of IRS Notice 2014-54, which was published by the IRS on September 18, 2014.

The after-tax contribution strategy is only available if the plan documents specifically allow for after-tax contributions.

== See also ==
- 401(k)
- SEP IRA
- Form 1099-R
