= Roth 401(k) =

Type of retirement/pension plan in the United States

The Roth 401(k) is a type of retirement savings plan. It was authorized by the United States Congress under the Internal Revenue Code, section 402A, and represents a unique combination of features of the Roth IRA and a traditional 401(k) plan. Since January 1, 2006, U.S. employers have been allowed to amend their 401(k) plan document to allow employees to elect Roth IRA type tax treatment for a portion or all of their retirement plan contributions. The same change in law allowed Roth IRA type contributions to 403(b) retirement plans. The Roth retirement plan provision was enacted as a provision of the Economic Growth and Tax Relief Reconciliation Act of 2001 (EGTRRA 2001).

== Traditional 401(k) plan ==
In a traditional 401(k) plan, introduced by Congress in 1978, employees contribute pre-tax earnings to their retirement plan, also called "elective deferrals". That is, an employee's elective deferral funds are set aside by the employer in a special account where the funds are allowed to be invested in various options made available in the plan. The IRS sets a limit on the amount of funds deferred in this way, and includes a "catch up" provision intended to allow older workers to save for their approaching retirement. These limits are adjusted each year to reflect changes in the cost of living due to inflation. For tax-year 2019, this limit is $19,500 for those under age 50, and $26,000 for those 50 and over.

Employers may also add funds to the account by contributing matching funds on a fractional formula basis (e.g., matching funds might be added at the rate of 50% of employees' elective deferrals), or on a set percentage basis. Funds within the 401(k) account grow on a tax deferred basis. Account owners reaching the age of 59½ may begin to receive "qualified distributions" from the funds in the account; these distributions are then taxed at ordinary income tax rates. Exceptions exist to allow distribution of funds before 59½, such as "substantially equal periodic payments", disability, and separation from service after the age of 55, as outlined under IRS Code section 72(t).

== Roth IRA ==
Under a Roth IRA, first enacted in 1998, individuals, whether employees or self-employed, voluntarily contribute post-tax funds to an individual retirement arrangement (IRA). In contrast to the 401(k) plan, the Roth plan requires post-tax contributions, but allows for tax free growth and distribution, provided the contributions have been invested for at least 5 years and the account owner has reached age 59½. Roth IRA contribution limits are significantly lower than 401(k) contribution limits. For tax years 2016 and 2017, individuals could contribute no more than $5,500 per year to a Roth IRA if under age 50, and $6,500 if age 50 or older. For tax years 2019, 2020, and 2021, contributions up to $6,000 are permitted under age 50, or $7,000 if 50 or older. Additionally, Roth IRA contribution limits are reduced for taxpayers with a Modified Adjusted Gross Income (modified AGI) greater than $125,000 ($198,000 for married filing jointly), phasing out entirely for individuals with a modified AGI of $140,000 ($208,000 for married filing jointly), for 2021. See 401(k) versus IRA matrix that compares various types of IRAs with various types of 401(k)s.

== Roth 401(k) plans ==
The Roth 401(k) combines some of the most advantageous aspects of both the 401(k) and the Roth IRA. Under the Roth 401(k), employees may contribute funds on a post-tax elective deferral basis, in addition to or instead of pre-tax elective deferrals under their traditional 401(k) plans. An employee's combined elective deferrals whether to a traditional 401(k), a Roth 401(k), or both cannot exceed the IRS limits for deferral of the traditional 401(k). Employers' matching funds are not included in the elective deferral cap but are considered for the maximum section 415 limit, which is $58,000 for 2021, or $64,500 for those age 50 and older. The higher section 415 limit also applies to after tax contributions, which, depending on the specific 401(k), might be convertible into a Roth 401(k) later.

Employers are permitted to make matching contributions on employees' designated Roth contributions. However, employers' contributions cannot receive the Roth tax treatment. The matching contributions made on account of designated Roth contributions must be allocated to a pre-tax account, just as matching contributions are on traditional, pre-tax elective contributions. (Pub 4530)

In general, the difference between a Roth 401(k) and a traditional 401(k) is that income contributed to the Roth version is taxable in the year it is earned, but income contributed to the traditional version is taxable in the year in which it is distributed from the account. Furthermore, earnings on the traditional version are taxable income in the year they are distributed, but earnings on the Roth version are never taxable.

There are restrictions on the nontaxability of Roth earnings: typically, the distribution must be made at least 5 years after the first Roth contribution and after the recipient is age 59 ½.

A Roth 401(k) plan is probably most advantageous to those who might otherwise choose a Roth IRA, such as younger workers who are currently taxed in a lower tax bracket but expect to be taxed in a higher bracket upon reaching retirement age. Higher-income workers may prefer a traditional 401(k) plan because they are currently taxed in a higher tax bracket but would expect to be taxed at a lower rate in retirement; also, those near the Roth IRA income limits may prefer a traditional 401(k) since its pre-tax contributions lowers Modified Adjusted Gross Income (MAGI) and thus increases eligibility for various other tax incentives (Roth IRA contributions, the Child Tax Credit, medical expense deduction, etc.). Another consideration for those currently in higher tax brackets is the future of income tax rates in the US: if income tax rates increase, current taxation would be desirable for a wider group. The Roth 401(k) offers the advantage of tax free distribution but is not constrained by the same income limitations. For example, in tax year 2013, normal Roth IRA contributions are limited to $5,500 ($6,500 if age 50 or older); up to $17,500 could be contributed to a Roth 401(k) account if no other elective deferrals were taken for the tax year, such as traditional 401(k) deferrals.

Adoption of Roth 401(k) plans has been relatively slow, partly because they require additional administrative recordkeeping and payroll processing. However some larger firms have now adopted Roth 401(k) plans, which is expected to spur their adoption by other firms including smaller ones. IRS Raises 2022 401(k) Contribution Limit to $20,500, a $1,000 boost from 2021 contribution limits.

=== Additional considerations ===
- Roth 401(k) contributions are irrevocable; once money is invested into a Roth 401(k) account, it cannot be moved to a regular 401(k) account.
- Employees can roll their Roth 401(k) contributions over to a Roth IRA account upon termination of employment.
- It is the employer's decision whether to provide access to the Roth 401(k) in addition to the traditional 401(k). Many employers find that the added administrative burden outweighs the benefits of the Roth 401(k).
- The Roth 401(k) program was originally set up to sunset after 2010, along with the rest of EGTRRA 2001. The Pension Protection Act of 2006 extended it.
- Until the end of 2022, owners of Roth 401(k) accounts (designated Roth accounts) must begin distributions at age 72, as with IRAs and other retirement plans. (Pub 4530)
- Starting in 2023, the SECURE 2.0 Act of 2022 changes the age when distributions must begin to 73.
- Starting in 2024, the SECURE 2.0 Act of 2022 removes the requirement to take distributions from Roth 401(k) accounts, making them more similar to Roth IRAs.
- Employees need to consider their current tax rates to future tax rates to determine if a Roth 401(k) should be chosen over a traditional account.

== See also ==
- 401(k)
- Comparison of 401(k) and IRA accounts - 401k & IRA comparisons (401k vs Roth 401k vs Traditional IRA vs Roth IRA)
- 403(b)
- Form 1099-R
- Individual Retirement Account
- Internal Revenue Service
- Rollovers as Business Start-Ups
- Self-Directed IRA
