= Rollovers as business start-ups =

Rollovers as business start-ups (ROBS) are arrangements in the United States in which current or prospective business owners use their 401(k), IRA or other retirement funds to pay for new business start-up costs, for business acquisition costs or to refinance an existing business. In 2008, the Internal Revenue Service set up the ROBS Compliance Project to monitor such arrangements.

== Background ==
ROBS plans, while not considered an abusive tax avoidance transaction, are, according to the IRS, "questionable" because they may solely benefit one individual – the individual who rolls over his or her existing retirement 401k withdrawal funds to the ROBS plan in a tax-free transaction. Since the IRS pronouncement concerning this potentially discriminatory approach, most ROBS plans have included all participants and have provided broad-based participation for all employees. The ROBS plan then uses the rollover assets to purchase the stock of the new business. A C corporation must be set up in order to roll the 401(k) withdrawal.

Promoters and facilitators, such as Roth IRA brokers of self-directed IRA LLCs, or small business financing, market IRS ROBS arrangements to prospective entrepreneurs and business owners for funding for a business as small business financing. Most have a very close relationship with the franchise industry, seeking to sell and promote business "opportunities" and find funding sources for these sales and promotions. Most ROBS promoters and facilitators pay substantial referral fees to the franchise brokers. These fees are rarely disclosed to the entrepreneur. Fees charged by most promoters are higher than would be charged by attorneys and accountants, who are prohibited from paying referral fees. Some companies offering ROBS plans do not pay referral fees to brokers, and charge lower fees as a result. There remains a substantial question whether such referral fees are illegal under ERISA and the U.S. Criminal Code: Offer, Acceptance, or Solicitation to Influence Operations of Employee Benefit Plan (18 U.S.C. Section 1954).

In many cases, the broker will apply to IRS for a favorable determination letter (DL) as a way to assure their clients that the IRS approves the ROBS arrangement. The IRS issues a favorable DL if a plan's terms meet Internal Revenue Code requirements. A favorable DL does not give plan sponsors protection from incorrectly applying the plan's terms, nor from operating the plan in a discriminatory manner. When a plan sponsor administers a plan in a way that results in prohibited discrimination or engages in prohibited transactions, it can result in plan disqualification and adverse tax consequences to the plan's sponsor and its participants. Accordingly, promoters who emphasize or "promote" based on a favorable DL are, at a minimum, engaging in deceptive trade practices.

ROBS plans are an alternative for start up franchises or businesses to receiving an SBA loan or conventional bank financing.

== ROBS Project findings ==
=== New business failures ===
Preliminary results from the ROBS Project indicate that, although there were a few success stories, most ROBS businesses either failed or were on the road to failure with high rates of bankruptcy (business and personal), liens (business and personal), and corporate dissolutions by individual Secretaries of State. Some individuals who started ROBS plans lost not only their retirement assets, accumulated over many years, but also their dream of owning a business. As a result, much of their retirement savings were depleted or 'lost', often even before they had begun trading.

=== Specific problems ===
There are many potential problems with ROBS.

- After the ROBS plan sponsor purchases the new company's employer stock with the rollover funds, the sponsor amends the plan to prevent other participants from purchasing stock. Since the 2008 announcement from the IRS such amendments are rare.
  - After the DL is issued, these amendments may violate the Code qualification requirements, and raise problems with coverage, discrimination and, potentially, violations of benefits, rights and features requirements.
- Promoter fees
- Valuation of assets
- Failure to issue a Form 1099-R when the assets are rolled over into the ROBS plan

== See also ==
- American Association of Franchisees and Dealers
- 401(k) IRA matrix
- 403(b)
