= Keogh plan =

Type of pension plan in the U.S

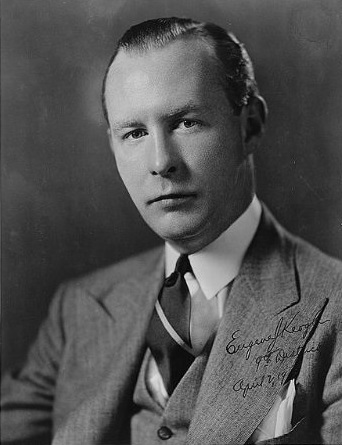
Eugene J. Keogh, congressman from New York

Keogh plans are a type of retirement plan for self-employed people and small businesses in the United States.

== History ==
Named for U.S. Representative Eugene James Keogh of New York, they are sometimes called HR10 plans. IRS Publication 560 refers to them as "Qualified Plans". They are different from individual retirement accounts (IRAs).

== Format ==
There are two basic types of Keogh plan: defined-benefit, and defined-contribution.

In a defined-contribution plan, a fixed contribution (percentage of total paycheck or a fixed sum) is made per pay period. It may be set up as a profit-sharing plan, where the pension that one can withdraw after retirement depends on how much they invested in the plan while they worked.

The defined-benefits plan is more complex. It relies on an IRS formula to calculate the rate of contributions.

In either case, as in other retirement plans such as 401(k)s and IRAs, the funds in the plan can be invested in company shares, bonds, mutual funds, etc.

== Benefits ==
The main benefit of a Keogh plan versus other retirement plans is that a Keogh plan has higher contribution limits for some individuals. For 2011, employees can generally contribute up to $16,500 per year, and the employer can contribute up to $32,500, for a total annual contribution of $49,000. The total contribution cap is $50,000 for 2012, $51,000 for 2013, $52,000 for 2014, and up to 25% of compensation or $53,000 in 2016, whichever is lower.

A person with a Keogh plan can also contribute to an IRA (traditional or Roth).

== Drawbacks ==
Keogh plans are not as common as most other retirement plans because there are several limitations to Keogh plans.

Compared to other retirement plans (traditional IRA, SIMPLE IRA, etc.), Keogh plans require more administrative paperwork. While most small business owners can manage to set up other plans themselves, a Keogh plan requires complex calculations and professional help to establish. They've been largely replaced by SEP IRAs, which have the same contribution limits but much less paperwork.

Keogh plans cannot be established by an employee. Keogh plans are applicable to self-employed individuals who own their own unincorporated business (sole proprietorships, partnerships and LLCs).

Contributions can be made "pre-tax", meaning that the contributions can be deducted from this year's taxable income, but taxes must be paid on the money when it is withdrawn during retirement. In 2002, the EGTRRA Act of 2001 allowed Roth Keogh plans to be made, which means contributions into Roth Keogh accounts are made with "post-tax" dollars, meaning they are not deducted from this year's taxable income but qualified withdrawals are tax-free provided certain conditions are met.

Penalties may apply for making withdrawals from a Keogh plan before the account holder turns 59½.

The main benefit of a Keogh plan versus other plans (Keogh's high contribution limit) is lost in individuals who do not make a high level of income. These individuals may get the same benefits of a Keogh plan with less administrative cost by using another type of retirement plan (401(k), SEP-IRA, etc.). This is best illustrated by comparing the following three scenarios:

Scenario #1 – A self-employed accountant makes $50,000 per year from her accounting business. Her maximum contribution is 25% of her post-contribution income ($10,000, which would be the same as saying 20% of her gross income), regardless of whether she uses a SEP-IRA, Keogh plan, or SIMPLE 401(k). Since there are less administrative costs, she would benefit most from choosing either the SEP-IRA or SIMPLE 401(k).

Scenario #2 – A family physician who owns his own practice makes $100,000 per year. His maximum contribution is 25% of his post-contribution income ($20,000, which would be the same as saying 20% of his gross income) whether he uses a Keogh plan or a SEP-IRA. The cost of maintaining the SEP-IRA is much less, so he would benefit more from that plan.

Scenario #3 – An entrepreneur who owns a small marketing firm makes $400,000 per year. She wishes to contribute as much as possible to a retirement plan in order to minimize her current taxes. She could contribute up to $11,500 for a SIMPLE IRA, $49,000 to a SEP-IRA, or up to $50,000 (contribution cap for 2012) in a Keogh plan. By choosing the Keogh plan over the SEP-IRA, she can contribute an additional $1,000 per year into her retirement plan.
