= Pensioensparen =

Contribution limit per year
Year	Contribution limit
2020-2024	€990
2019	€980
2018	€960
2013-2017	€940
2012	€910
2011	€880
2008-2010	€830
2007	€810
2006	€800
2005	€780
2004	€610

Pensioensparen is a form of retirement savings in Belgium in which a person puts aside an amount of money each year for their retirement, in addition to the state pension. In this sense, it is a form of retirement saving akin to individual retirement accounts in the United States.
