= Steven Venti =

American academic

Academic background
- Alma mater: Harvard University; Boston College

Academic work
- Discipline: Retirement Savings; Economics of the Elderly; IRA; 401K
- Institutions: Dartmouth College, DeWalt Ankeny Professor of Economic Policy and Professor of Economics
- Website: http://www.dartmouth.edu/~bventi/; Information at IDEAS / RePEc

Steven F. Venti is the DeWalt Ankeny Professor of Economic Policy and a professor of economics at Dartmouth College.

== Background and research ==
Venti's research focuses on "the well-being of older households" and he currently is examining the "effectiveness of 401(K)s and similar retirement saving plans, whether the elderly are financially prepared for retirement, how households manage their wealth after retirement, and the role of health in the financial security of older households." His research has been cited over 6,000 times and has been published in a number of top economic journals such as the American Economic Review and the Quarterly Journal of Economics. His findings have also been featured in The New York Times. In addition to teaching an undergraduate course in finance, he is a research associate at the NBER.

Venti served as the Chair of the Department of Economics at Dartmouth College from 2008 to 2010. He was also the recipient of the Samuelson Certificate of Excellence Award in 1997.

== Education ==
Venti graduated from Boston College in 1982 with a B.A. in economics and from Harvard University in 1982 with a Ph.D. in economics.
