= Traditional IRA =

Type of individual retirement arrangement

A traditional IRA is an individual retirement arrangement (IRA), established in the United States by the Employee Retirement Income Security Act of 1974 (ERISA) (Pub. L. 93–406, 88 Stat. 829, enacted September 2, 1974, codified in part at 29 U.S.C. ch. 18). Normal IRAs also existed before ERISA.

== Overview ==
An author described the traditional IRA in 1982 as "the biggest tax break in history". The IRA is held at a custodian institution such as a bank or brokerage, and may be invested in anything that the custodian allows (for instance, a bank may allow certificates of deposit, and a brokerage may allow stocks and mutual funds). Unlike the Roth IRA, the only criterion for being eligible to contribute to a traditional IRA is sufficient income to make the contribution. Contributions are tax-deductible but with eligibility requirements based on income, filing status, and availability of other retirement plans (mandated by the Internal Revenue Service). Transactions and profits in the account are not taxed. Withdrawals are subject to federal income tax (see below for details), and have more restrictions than a Roth IRA.

This is in contrast to a Roth IRA, in which contributions are never tax-deductible, transactions and profits inside the account are not taxed, but qualified withdrawals are tax free.

According to IRS pension/retirement department as of July 13, 2009, traditional IRAs (originally called Regular IRAs) were created in 1975 and made available for tax reporting that year as well. The original contribution amount in 1975 was limited to $1,500 or 15% of the wages/salaries/tips reported on line 8 of Form 1040 (1975).

Annual traditional IRA contributions are limited as follows:

Year	Age 49 and below	Age 50 and above
2005	$4,000	$4,500
2006–2007	$4,000	$5,000
2008–2012*	$5,000	$6,000
2013–2018	$5,500	$6,500
2019–2021	$6,000	$7,000

Since 2009, contribution limits have been assessed for potential increases based on inflation.

== Advantages ==
- An IRA protects wealth from creditors, but also cannot be used as collateral when borrowing.
- With a traditional IRA, one always has an option to convert to a Roth IRA; whereas a Roth IRA cannot be converted back into a traditional IRA. One can choose an optimal (lowest tax rate) time to convert over one's life. Because one has a right, but not an obligation, to convert, this is like an option in finance. As with options in finance, this flexibility, which allows one to hedge future uncertainty, adds some additional value to the traditional IRA.
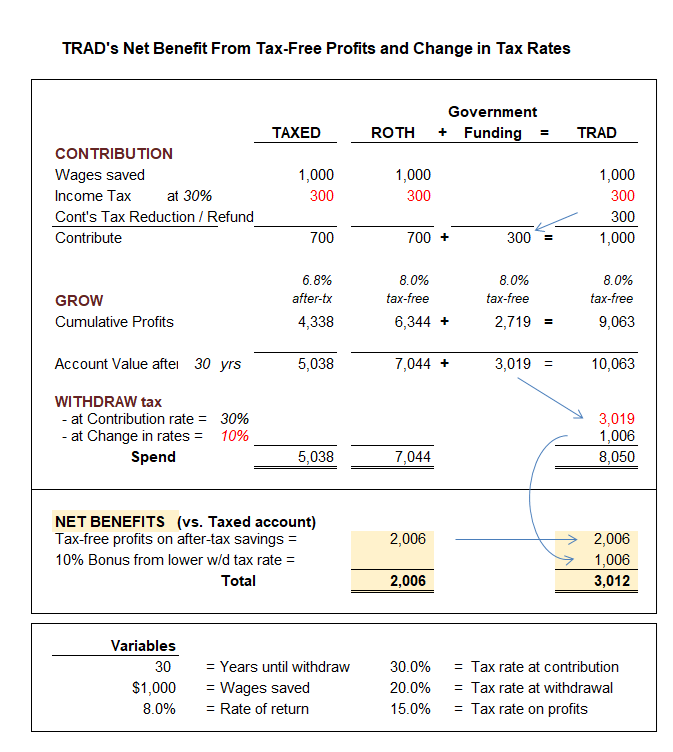
  The TRAD's benefits comes mainly from the same benefit as a ROTH (permanently tax free profits on after-tax savings), plus a bonus/penalty from changing tax rates.
- Savers mostly care about the tax-saving benefits, as measured by the difference in outcomes vs a normally taxed account. There is a possible benefit (or cost) equal to the eventual withdrawal multiplied by the difference in tax rates between contribution and withdrawal. The hope is that the retirement rate will be lower, for a benefit. Effective tax rates are used to incorporate the impact on taxable income of contributions and draws, on the saver's qualification for benefits from other income-tested programs.
- The only tax-saving benefit that everyone always receives is the same benefit as from a Roth account - permanently tax-free profits on after-tax savings. The conceptual understanding is that the contribution's tax reduction is the government investing its money alongside the saver's, for him to invest as he likes. They become co-owners of the account. The government's share of the account (funding plus the tax-free profits earned by it) at withdrawal fully funds the account's withdrawal tax calculated at the contribution's tax rate. So the contribution's tax reduction is never a benefit, and no profits (neither the saver's nor the government's) are ever taxed. The withdrawal tax is conceptually an allocation of principal between owners, not a 'tax', and there is no benefit 'from deferral'.

Contradictory benefit claims include:

- The primary benefit of any tax deferred savings plan, such as an IRA, is that the amount of money available to invest is larger than would be the case with a post-tax savings plan, such as a Roth IRA. This means that the multiplier effect of compound interest, or for example, larger reinvested dividends, will yield a larger sum over time. Financial institutions also generally give higher rates of interest to larger sums invested in instruments such as certificates of deposit; however, this comes with the risk that, over a significant period of time, the eventual rate of income tax levied on withdrawal is unforeseeable — and could be higher than originally anticipated.
- While many people think that the reduction in taxes in the year of contribution is a benefit, that is not necessarily the case. While it is true that the unpaid taxes can be immediately invested and continue to grow, taxes on these gains will need to eventually be paid—either on an ongoing basis, if invested in a non-tax-deferred vehicle (e.g. if pre-tax options are already maximized), or at withdrawal otherwise. Assuming that both the tax deduction and the tax on its reinvestment gains only affect the individual's top tax bracket, the results are tax-neutral. Any potential benefits of claiming and reinvesting a tax deduction come from the expectation that the taxpayer may be in a lower tax bracket during retirement.

== Disadvantages ==
- One must meet the eligibility requirements to qualify for tax benefits. If one is an active participant in a retirement plan at work, one's income must be below a specific threshold for their filing status. If one's income (and thus tax rate) is that low, it might make more sense to pay taxes now (Roth IRA) rather than defer them (traditional IRA).
- All withdrawals from a traditional IRA are included in gross income, which are subject to federal income tax (with the exception of any nondeductible contributions; there is a formula for determining how much of a withdrawal is not subject to tax). This tax is in lieu of the original tax on employment income, which had been deferred in the year of the contribution. It is not taxed on the gains of said contributions while inside the account.
- Because taxes (and maybe penalties) must be paid before cash in the account can be withdrawn and used, this account is hard to use for emergencies.
- The size of an IRA account may mislead people into believing their wealth is larger than it actually is. The tax benefit from contributions is essentially a loan that must be paid back on withdrawal. Net wealth calculations must subtract an estimate of that tax. This effect means that $xx saved in a traditional IRA is not equal to $xx saved in a Roth IRA. Contributions to a traditional IRA are from pre-tax income and contributions to a Roth are from after-tax income.
- Withdrawals must begin by age 72 (more precisely, by April 1 of the calendar year after age 72 is reached) according to a formula. If an investor fails to make the required withdrawal, half of the mandatory amount will be confiscated automatically by the IRS. The Roth is completely free of these mandates. This creates taxable income. Any withdrawal not needed for spending has lost its tax shelter on future growth.
- In addition to the contribution being included as taxable income, the IRS will also assess a 10% early withdrawal penalty if the participant is under age 59½. The IRS will waive this penalty with some exceptions, including first time home purchase (up to $10,000), higher education expenses, death, disability, un-reimbursed medical expenses, health insurance, annuity payments and payments of IRS levies, all of which must meet certain stipulations.
- The recognition of taxable income in retirement instead of when working may affect a person's qualification for government benefits that are income-tested. The loss of these benefits can be evaluated by including them in the calculation of the tax rate on withdrawals.

== Eligibility to contribute to a traditional IRA ==
- A taxpayer must earn qualified income in order to make a contribution. Also, a taxpayer's IRA contributions cannot exceed that taxpayer's income in a given year. For example, if a taxpayer makes a total of $2000 in taxable compensation in a given year, then the maximum IRA contribution is $2000. Note, income from investments may not be qualified as eligible for the purposes of IRA contributions.

== Income limits only apply to certain taxpayers ==
All United States income taxpayers can make IRA contributions and defer the taxation on the earnings. However, not all IRA contributions are deductible from a taxpayer's income tax.

If one or more members of a household participates in an employer-sponsored retirement plan, and the taxpayer's Modified Adjusted Gross Income is above the amount listed in the table below, then some or all of the taxpayer's IRA contribution will not be tax deductible. Consequently, traditional IRAs are sometimes further classified and referred to as either "deductible" or "non-deductible." Except as otherwise noted, all columns below are for IRA contributors who participate in an employer-sponsored retirement plan.

The lower number represents the point at which the taxpayer is still allowed to deduct the entire maximum yearly contribution. The upper number is the point as of which the taxpayer is no longer allowed to deduct any of that year's contribution. The deduction is reduced proportionally for taxpayers in the range. Note that people who are married and lived together, but who file separately, are only allowed to deduct a relatively small amount.

Year	Married filing jointly	Married filing jointly (IRA contributor is not covered by a workplace retirement plan but is married to someone who is covered)	Single	Married filing separately
2007	$83,000–$103,000	$156,000–$166,000	$52,000–$62,000	$0–$10,000
2008	$85,000–$105,000	$159,000–$169,000	$53,000–$63,000	$0–$10,000
2009	$89,000–$109,000	$166,000–$176,000	$55,000–$65,000	$0–$10,000
2010	$89,000–$109,000	$167,000–$177,000	$56,000–$66,000	$0–$10,000
2011	$90,000–$110,000	$169,000–$179,000	$56,000–$66,000	$0–$10,000
2013	$95,000–$115,000	$178,000–$188,000	$59,000–$69,000	$0–$10,000
2014	$96,000–$116,000	$181,000–$191,000	$60,000–$70,000	$0–$10,000
2015	$98,000–$118,000	$183,000–$193,000	$61,000–$71,000	$0–$10,000
2016	$98,000–$118,000	$184,000–$194,000	$61,000–$71,000	$0–$10,000
2017	$99,000–$119,000	$186,000–$196,000	$62,000–$72,000	$0–$10,000
2018	$101,000–$121,000	$189,000–$199,000	$63,000–$73,000	$0–$10,000
2019	$103,000–$123,000	$193,000–$203,000	$64,000–$72,000	$0–$10,000
2020	$104,000–$124,000	$196,000–$206,000	$65,000–$75,000	$0–$10,000
2021	$105,000–$125,000	$198,000–$208,000	$66,000–$76,000	$0–$10,000

== Converting a traditional IRA to a Roth IRA ==
Conversion of all or a part of a traditional IRA account to a Roth IRA results in the converted funds being taxed as income in the year they are converted (with the exception of non-deductible assets).

Prior to 2010, two circumstances prohibit a conversion to a Roth IRA: Modified Adjusted Gross Income exceeding $100,000 or the participant's tax filing status is Married Filing Separately. With recent legislation, as part of the Tax Increase Prevention and Reconciliation Act of 2005 (TIPRA), the modified AGI requirement of $100,000 and not be married filing separately criteria were removed in 2010.

There may be a benefit from conversion in addition to the preferential timing of tax. The taxes due need not come from the account balance converted. If the taxes are paid from another taxable account, the effect is as if the income from those dollars are sheltered from tax.

== Transfers versus rollovers ==
Transfers and rollovers are two ways of moving IRA sheltered assets between financial institutions.

A transfer is normally initiated by the institution receiving the funds. A request is sent to the disbursing institution for a transfer and a check (made payable to the other institution) is sent in return. This transaction is not reported to the IRS. Transfers are allowed to and from traditional IRAs or from employer plans.

A rollover (sometimes referred to as a 60-day rollover) can also be used to move IRA money between institutions. A distribution is made from the institution disbursing the funds. A check would be made payable directly to the participant. The participant would then have to make a rollover contribution to the receiving financial institution within 60 days in order for the funds to retain their IRA status. This type of transaction can only be done once every 12 months with the same funds. Contrary to a transfer, a rollover is reported to the IRS. The participant who received the distribution will have that distribution reported to the IRS. Once the distribution is rolled into an IRA, the participant will be sent a Form 5498 to report on their taxes to nullify any tax consequence of the initial distribution.

== See also ==
- Comparison of 401(k) and IRA accounts
- Form 1099-R
