= Employee Benefit Research Institute =

American research institute

Employee Benefit Research Institute (EBRI)
- Founded: 1978
- Type: Independent research institute
- Location(s): 901 D St. SW, Suite 802; Washington, D.C. 20024
- Key people: Barb Marder (President & CEO)
- Budget: Revenue: $3,865,277; Expenses: $4,217,486 (FYE December 2020)
- Website: ebri.org

Employee Benefit Research Institute (EBRI) is a nonpartisan, nonprofit research organization based in Washington, D.C., that produces original research about health, savings, retirement, personal finance and economic security issues, including 401(k) and retirement plan coverage data, post-retirement income adequacy, health coverage and the uninsured, and economic security of the elderly.

The EBRI is an independent institute, representing no particular special interest or ideological perspective. Its membership includes a broad range of benefit-related organizations that often have differing policy goals.

As well, the EBRI maintains the largest 401(k) microdatabase in the nation that tracks individual 401(k) participant investment activity. EBRI researchers have been frequently asked to testify about their research before Congress on a variety of retirement, health, savings, and economic security issues.

== History ==
The EBRI was founded in 1978 by a group of benefits-related companies following enactment of the Employee Retirement Income Security Act of 1974 (ERISA), the major federal law governing private-sector benefits. It is based on three principles: That employee benefit plans serve an essential function in the United States economy by providing citizens with opportunities to achieve financial security; an ongoing need exists for objective, unbiased information regarding the employee benefits system; and that its members’ common business interests will be furthered by having the Institute develop and disseminate such information.

== Publications ==
The EBRI’s research periodicals include EBRI Issue Briefs, Fast Facts, Infographics and EBRInteractives. In addition to its website, it publishes a variety of electronic products, such as a blog, Twitter site and a LinkedIn site.

== Policy stance ==
The Employee Benefit Research Institute does not take policy positions and does not lobby.

== Policy research ==
The EBRI has tracked the decline of traditional "defined benefit” pensions and the growth of defined contribution (401(k)-type) retirement plans, trends in retirement, trends in employment-base health benefits, and conducted public opinion surveys related to retirement and health benefits.

The EBRI publishes data on trends and characteristics of health insurance coverage and the uninsured, and how the type of health plans offered to workers have been changing in the private sector. It has also quantified the amount of money that single men, single women, and married couples will need to save to pay for out-of-pocket health care in retirement.

In conjunction with the Investment Company Institute (ICI), EBRI created and operates the EBRI/ICI 401(k) database, the largest microdatabase of its kind in the nation tracking individual 401(k) participants. EBRI also tracks the growing importance of individual-account retirement plans such as 401(k)s and individual retirement accounts (IRAs).

Using its Retirement Security Projection Model, EBRI has published detailed analysis showing likely retirement income adequacy levels for Americans by age and income. It has also reported likely results if deficit reduction efforts in Congress reduce or eliminate existing tax preferences for 401(k)s.

The EBRI’s Social Security modeling allows it to quantify the impact of various reform proposals. Its 1998 analysis was the first in-depth look at the many administrative issues involved with adding private accounts to Social Security, at the time a major policy proposal.

== Surveys ==
The Employee Benefit Research Institute’s annual Retirement Confidence Survey, which began in 1990, is the longest-running annual retirement survey of its kind in the nation. Its annual Workplace Wellness Survey asks questions to employees about workplace-based benefits. The EBRI Consumer Engagement in Health Care Survey provides national data on the growth of consumer-driven health plans and high-deductible health plans.

== Programs ==
Previously, through its Education and Research Fund (ERF), EBRI operated the Choose to Save national public education and outreach campaign, and the American Savings Education Council, a national coalition of public- and private-sector organizations that promote saving.

As part of its Choose to Save initiative, EBRI developed the Ballpark Estimate for ASEC, a two-page worksheet that identifies a person’s general savings target for a comfortable retirement. It is used as the retirement calculator for federal employees on the Office of Personnel Management’s Federal Ballpark E$timate website and also by the U.S. Thrift Savings Plan on its website. In 2023, the Employee Benefit Research Institute relaunched a new version of its Ballpark E$timate online retirement planning tool.
