= Mon Valley Works–Irvin Plant =

Steel processing plant in Pennsylvania, US

Coordinates: 40.33637°N 79.90393°W

The Mon Valley Works–Irvin Plant is a steel processing plant operated by U.S. Steel and historically a "hot strip mill" (sometimes referred to as a "steel mill") in the Pittsburgh suburb of West Mifflin, Pennsylvania. The site consists of 650 acres on a hilltop 250 feet above the Monongahela Valley. The plant has an annual capacity of 2.9 million net tons of steel from an 80″ hot strip mill, 64″ and 84″ Pickle lines, 84″ five-stand cold reduction mill, continuous annealing line, batch and open-coil annealing facilities, 84″ temper mill, 52″ hot-dip galvanizing line and a 48″ hot-dip galvanizing line, as well as the #11 Shear Line and #17 Recoil line. The #11 shear line starts with the Kline conveyor.

== History ==
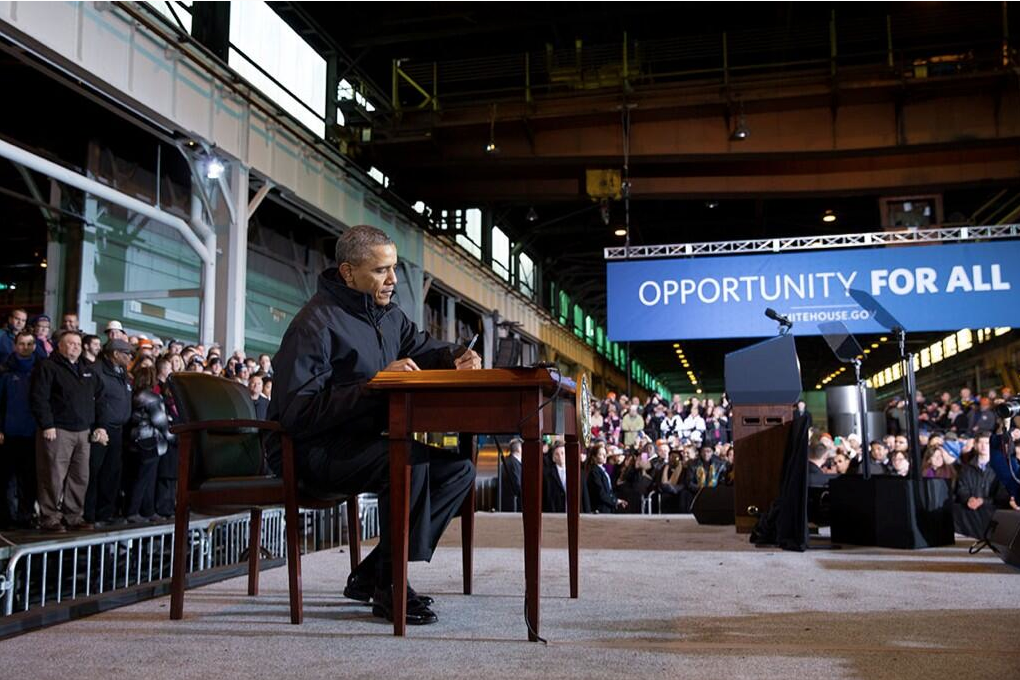
President Obama visits the Irvin Plant in January 2014

The mill was announced on May 22, 1937 and opened in phases starting on March 2, 1938 while being dedicated on December 15, 1938 for U.S. Steel and was constructed by Mesta Machinery. U.S. Steel has claimed that construction of the hilltop site required more cubic yards of earth moved (4.4 million cubic yards) than any project other than the Panama Canal. The cost of the construction of the facility was estimated at $63 million ($1.44 billion today). It produced its 80 millionth ton of steel in 1981 with a workforce of 4,000 that year.

In 1943 a Pittsburgh grand jury indicted four Carnegie Illinois foremen for destroying records of steel plating tests conducted at Irvin.

Texas Governor Rick Perry made a major televised campaign stop at the plant in October 2011.

In January 2012 a large explosion and fire rocked the plant.

President Barack Obama visited the plant in January 2014 to launch his program on new retirement accounts, signing the myRA at a televised ceremony at the plant.

In May 2019 U.S. Steel announced a project to spend $1 billion to build a combined casting and rolling facility. The project was repurposed in 2021.

President Donald Trump visited the plant in May 2025 to celebrate the newly announced partnership between U.S. Steel and Nippon Steel.
