= Rousey v. Jacoway =

- Supreme Court of the United States

Argued December 1, 2004 Decided April 4, 2005
- Full case name: Richard Gerald Rousey, et ux., Petitioners v. Jill R. Jacoway
- Citations: 544 U.S. 320 (more) 125 S. Ct. 1561; 161 L. Ed. 2d 563; 2005 U.S. LEXIS 2933; 73 U.S.L.W. 4277; 2005-1 U.S. Tax Cas. (CCH) ¶ 50,258; 95 A.F.T.R.2d (RIA) 1716; 34 Employee Benefits Cas. (BNA) 1929; Bankr. L. Rep. (CCH) ¶ 80,263; 44 Bankr. Ct. Dec. 144; 18 Fla. L. Weekly Fed. S 223

Case history
- Prior: Federal Bankruptcy Court for the Western District of Arkansas sustains Jacoway's motion to absorb Rousey's IRA into the bankruptcy estate. Bankruptcy Appellate Panels affirms. Eight Circuit Court of Appeals affirms.

Holding
- IRAs fulfill both of the Bankruptcy code's Section 522(d)(10)(E) requirements that (1) the right to receive payment must be from a stock bonus, pension, profit-sharing, annuity, or similar plan or contract and (2) the right to receive payment must be on account of illness, disability, death, age, or length of service.

Court membership
- Chief Justice William Rehnquist Associate Justices John P. Stevens · Sandra Day O'Connor; Antonin Scalia · Anthony Kennedy; David Souter · Clarence Thomas; Ruth Bader Ginsburg · Stephen Breyer

Case opinion
- Majority: Thomas, joined by unanimous

Laws applied
- Title 11 of the United States Code

Rousey v. Jacoway, 544 U.S. 320 (2005), was a bankruptcy case decided by the United States Supreme Court in which the Court held that Individual Retirement Accounts (IRAs) qualify for certain exemptions under Title 11 of the United States Code.

== Background ==
Richard and Betty Jo Rousey filed a joint Chapter 7 bankruptcy petition in the United States Bankruptcy Court for the Western District of Arkansas. They petitioned the court to shield portions of their IRAs from their creditors under section 522(d)(10)(E) of the United States Bankruptcy Code (11 U.S.C. § 522(d)(10)(E)). Jill Jacoway, the Chapter 7 trustee, objected to the petition, and the court sustained the objection. The Bankruptcy Appellate Panel and the Eight Circuit Court of Appeals both affirmed.

== Opinion of the Court ==
Justice Thomas delivered the opinion of the unanimous court.

The Court held that IRAs qualify for exemption because such plans are intended to substitute income (like other plans and programs specifically listed in the statute) and payments from the plan are because of one's age, thus satisfying the section's requirements.
