= Unrelated Business Income Tax =

Type of income tax for nonprofit organizations in the United States

Unrelated Business Income Tax (UBIT) in the U.S. Internal Revenue Code is the tax on unrelated business income, which comes from an activity engaged in by a tax-exempt 26 U.S.C. 501 organization that is not related to the tax-exempt purpose of that organization.

== Requirements ==
For most organizations, a business activity generates unrelated business income subject to taxation if:

1. It is a trade or business,
2. It is regularly carried on, and
3. It is not substantially related to furthering the exempt purpose of the organization.

A trade or business includes the selling of goods or services with the intention of having a profit. An activity is regularly carried on if it occurs with a frequency and continuity, similar to what a commercial entity would do if it performed the same activity. An activity is substantially related to furthering the exempt purpose of the organization if the activity contributes importantly to accomplishing the organization's purpose, other than for the sake of producing the income itself.

=== Examples ===
==== Unrelated to exempt purpose ====
A university runs a pizza parlor that sells pizza to students and non-students alike. The pizza parlor's workers are paid employees of the university. The university is a tax-exempt organization, and its pizza parlor generates unrelated business income. While the tuition and fees generated by the university are tax exempt, its income from the pizza parlor is not tax-exempt because the pizza parlor is unrelated to the university's educational purpose.

If a nonprofit organization receives income from providing services to outside entities and the performance of those services does not further the organization's mission of the organization, the income may be unrelated business income.

==== Advertising ====
If a nonprofit organization sells advertisements either in print or on the organization's web site, the income is typically unrelated business income if the advertisements promote the advertiser's business and not the nonprofit organization. On the other hand, if the business's name is simply mentioned in a non-advertisement manner and contains a message of support for the nonprofit organization, then it is likely considered to sponsorship income and not unrelated business income.

==== Licensing of intangible property ====
If a nonprofit organization licenses its intangible property and promotes an outside entity's business, the income may be unrelated business income. On the other hand, if the nonprofit organization licenses its intangible property and performs no other services related to the licensing, then the income is considered passive income and it is typically not unrelated business income.

==== S Corporation ownership stake ====
If a nonprofit organization has ownership in an S corporation, the income from the S corporation is typically unrelated business income. Gain or loss from the sale of stock in the S corporation stock is also typically unrelated business income.

==== Property held for the production of income ====
Under Internal Revenue Code section 514, property held for the production of income and subject to acquisition or improvement indebtedness will typically produce unrelated business income.

==== Activities not regularly carried on ====
If a social-service nonprofit organization holds a one-time bake sale, and the sale of baked goods is unrelated to their mission, the sales revenue may not be subject to unrelated business income tax because the activity is not regularly carried on. In general, business activities of an exempt organization ordinarily are considered regularly carried on if they show a frequency and continuity, and they are pursued in a manner similar to comparable commercial activities of nonexempt organizations.

==== Unpaid workers ====
In most cases, income may not be considered unrelated business income if the activity is performed by unpaid workers.

==== Profit-making intent ====
In most cases, income may not be considered unrelated business income if the organization perform the activity without the intent or expectation of making a profit on the activity.

=== Exclusions ===
Certain types of income are not considered unrelated business income, such as income from dividends; interest; royalties; rental of real property; research for a federal, state, or local government; and charitable contributions, gifts, and grants.

In addition, unrelated business income does not include income derived from the work of unpaid volunteers, income from the sale of donated goods, income from trade shows and conventions, income from legal gaming.

The Internal Revenue Service does not consider the receipt of assets from a closely related tax-exempt organization to be unrelated business income.

== Tax rate ==
The IRS taxes unrelated business income at the corporate tax rates (IRC section 11) except for certain section 511(b)(2) trusts which are taxed at trust tax rates.

== UBIT in an Individual Retirement Account ==
Individual retirement accounts generally are subject to tax on income that is taxable to most U.S. tax-exempt entities under 26 U.S.C. §511. 26 U.S.C. §408 contains many of the rules governing the treatment of Individual retirement accounts. §408(e)(1) states: "Any individual retirement account is exempt from taxation under this subtitle unless such account has ceased to be an individual retirement account by reason of paragraph (2) or (3). Notwithstanding the preceding sentence, any such account is subject to the taxes imposed by section 511 (relating to imposition of tax on unrelated business income of charitable, etc. organizations)."

In addition, the IRS unequivocally confirms this in the first few paragraphs of Chapter 1 of the November 2007 revision of Publication 598 that IRAs are "subject to the tax on unrelated business income".

=== Minimizing ===
The primary way investors have tried to limit the reach of the UBIT tax is by employing a strategy known as a "C Corp Blocker". The "C Corp Blocker" strategy involves the retirement account holder establishing a C Corporation and then investing the retirement funds into the C Corporation before the funds are ultimately invested into the planned investment. For example, if a retirement account investor is seeking to invest retirement funds into a business operated through a LLC, she can establish a C Corporation, invest her IRA funds through the C Corporation, and then have the C Corporation invest the funds into the business LLC. All income received by the C Corporation would be subject to the new reduced corporate tax rate of 21%, which is less than the 37% maximum UBIT tax rate and less than the old maximum corporate tax rate of 35%.

== History ==
Since at least 1928, tax-exempt organizations could earn tax-free income from both mission-related activities and commercial business activities that were unrelated to the purpose for which they were exempt, as long as they used the net profits for exempt purposes.

In 1947, a group of wealthy alumni donated C.F. Mueller Company, a pasta manufacturing company, to New York University Law School with the intention of the company's profits being used to fund the law school's educational activities. C.F. Mueller Company did not pay income tax on its profits because it now considered itself a charitable organization. The Internal Revenue Service challenged it. New York University Law School won the case because, at that point, tax-exempt organizations were not subject to income tax on their revenue from any source as long as the revenue was used towards the organization's tax-exempt purpose.

In 1950, Congress amended the tax law to introduce the concept of unrelated business income. Congress enacted the law because it was concerned about nonprofit organizations having an unfair advantage competing in the same activities as for-profit organizations. From that point on, revenue would be considered tax-exempt based on the source of the funds, rather than the use of the funds.
