= Roth IRA =

Individual retirement account

A Roth IRA is an individual retirement account (IRA) under United States law that is generally not taxed upon distribution, provided certain conditions are met. The principal difference between Roth IRAs and most other tax-advantaged retirement plans is that rather than granting an income tax reduction for contributions to the retirement plan, qualified withdrawals from the Roth IRA plan are tax-free, and growth in the account is tax-free.

The Roth IRA was introduced as part of the Taxpayer Relief Act of 1997 and is named for Senator William Roth.

== Overview ==
A Roth IRA can be an individual retirement account containing investments in securities, usually common stocks and bonds, often through mutual funds (although other investments, including derivatives, notes, certificates of deposit, and real estate are possible). A Roth IRA can also be an individual retirement annuity, which is an annuity contract or an endowment contract purchased from a life insurance company. As with all IRAs, the Internal Revenue Service mandates specific eligibility and filing status requirements. A Roth IRA's main advantages are its tax structure and the additional flexibility that this tax structure provides. Also, there are fewer restrictions on the investments that can be made in the plan than many other tax-advantaged plans, and this adds somewhat to their popularity, though the investment options available depend on the trustee (or the place where the plan is established).

The total contributions allowed per year to all IRAs is the lesser of one's taxable compensation (which is not the same as adjusted gross income) and the limit amounts as seen below (this total may be split up between any number of traditional and Roth IRAs. In the case of a married couple, each spouse may contribute the amount listed):

Year	Age 49 and Below	Age 50 and Above	Ref.
1998–2001	$2,000	$2,000	
2002–2004	$3,000	$3,500	
2005	$4,000	$4,500	
2006–2007	$4,000	$5,000	
2008–2012	$5,000	$6,000	
2013–2018	$5,500	$6,500	
2019–2022	$6,000	$7,000	
2023	$6,500	$7,500	
2024–2025	$7,000	$8,000	
2026	$7,500	$8,600	

== History ==
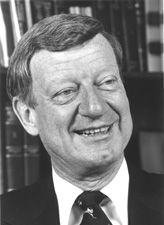
Senator William Roth, namesake of the Roth IRA

Originally introduced as the "IRA Plus", the concept behind what would become the Roth IRA was proposed in 1989 by Senators Bob Packwood and William Roth. Their plan (Packwood-Roth plan) allowed individuals to contribute up to $2,000 without receiving an upfront tax deduction; instead, the earnings would grow and be withdrawn tax-free in retirement. This early proposal established the basic logic of the later Roth IRA: paying taxes now in exchange for tax-free income later.

The Roth IRA was ultimately created by the Taxpayer Relief Act of 1997 and named after Senator Roth, its leading sponsor. Its introduction marked a significant shift in federal retirement policy by offering an alternative to traditional IRAs, which had lost their universal deductibility after the 1986 Tax Reform Act. Under congressional budget rules, restoring fully deductible IRAs for all taxpayers would have violated congressional budget limits, lawmakers restricted deductible IRAs to low-income households and provided the Roth IRA as an after-tax option for others. This structure allowed the cost of the tax break to fall largely outside the 10-year budget window, making the bill easier to pass.

While IRAs grew rapidly in the early 2000s, rising to over 50 million account holders and more than $3 trillion in assets by 2007, Roth IRAs represented only a small portion of these balances in the program’s early years. Their popularity grew gradually as more taxpayers became familiar with the benefits of tax-free withdrawals.

Economists have warned about exploding future revenue losses associated with Roth IRAs. With these accounts, the government is "bringing in more now, but giving up much more in the future", said economist and Forbes contributor Leonard Burman. In a study for The Tax Policy Center, Burman calculated that from 2014 to 2046, the Treasury would lose a total of $14 billion as a result of IRA-related provisions in the 2006 tax law. The losses stem from both Roth conversions and the ability to make nondeductible IRA contributions and then immediately convert them to Roths.

== Differences from a Traditional IRA ==
The main difference between a Roth IRA and Traditional IRA is how contributions and withdrawals are taxed. With a Roth IRA, all money contributed to the account is after-tax money, and withdrawals in retirement are tax-free. In contrast to a traditional IRA, contributions to a Roth IRA are not tax-deductible. Withdrawals are tax-free under certain conditions (for example, if the withdrawal is only on the principal portion of the account, or if the owner is at least 59½ years old). A Roth IRA has fewer withdrawal restrictions than traditional IRAs. Transactions inside a Roth IRA (including capital gains, dividends, and interest) do not incur a current tax liability. For a Traditional IRA, contributions are tax-deductible or before-tax money, meaning the account holder pays income tax later when they withdraw the money in retirement. For a Roth IRA, anyone with earned income can contribute to the account at any age, but contribution amounts phase out at higher income levels. A Traditional IRA allows for anyone with earned income to contribute until the age of 70½.

At the time of withdrawal, a Roth IRA has no required minimum distributions (RMDs), which means that the money in the account can grow for as long as the owner of the account wants. Contributions can be withdrawn anytime tax-free, and earnings can be withdrawn tax-free after five years and age 59½. For Traditional IRA’s, one must start taking RMDs at age 70 ½ where withdrawals will be taxed as ordinary income. Research suggests that if an investor expects to be in a lower tax bracket in retirement, then they should contribute to a Traditional IRA. A Roth IRA is more beneficial if an investor expects their tax rate to be higher in retirement or if they value tax-free withdrawals and flexibility.

== Advantages and disadvantages of a Roth IRA ==
=== Advantages ===
- Direct contributions to a Roth IRA (principal) may be withdrawn tax and penalty-free at any time. Earnings may be withdrawn tax and penalty-free after 5 years if the condition of age 59½ (or other qualifying condition) is also met. Rollover, converted (before age 59½) contributions held in a Roth IRA may be withdrawn tax and penalty-free after 5 years. Distributions from a Roth IRA do not increase Adjusted Gross Income. This differs from a traditional IRA, where all withdrawals are taxed as ordinary income, and a penalty applies for withdrawals before age 59½. Even capital gains on stocks or other securities held in a regular taxable account, so long as they are held for at least a year, are generally treated more advantageously than traditional IRA withdrawals, being taxed not as Ordinary Income, but at the lower Long-Term Capital Gain rate. This potentially higher tax rate for withdrawals of capital gains from a traditional IRA is a quid pro quo for the deduction taken against ordinary income when putting money into the IRA.
- Up to a lifetime maximum $10,000 in earnings, withdrawals are considered qualified (tax-free) if the money is used to acquire a principal residence for the Roth IRA owner. This principal residence must be acquired by the Roth IRA owner, their spouse, or their lineal ancestors and descendants. The owner or qualified relative who receives such a distribution must not have owned a home in the previous 24 months.
- Contributions may be made to a Roth IRA even if the owner participates in a qualified retirement plan such as a 401(k). (Contributions may be made to a traditional IRA in this circumstance, but they may not be tax deductible.)
- If the Roth IRA owner expects that the tax rate applicable to withdrawals from a traditional IRA in retirement will be higher than the tax rate applicable to the funds earned to make the Roth IRA contributions before retirement, then there may be a tax advantage to making contributions to a Roth IRA over a traditional IRA or similar vehicle while working. There is no current tax deduction, but money going into the Roth IRA is taxed at the taxpayer's current marginal tax rate, and will not be taxed at the expected higher future effective tax rate when it comes out of the Roth IRA. There is always risk, however, that retirement savings will be less than anticipated, which would produce a lower tax rate for distributions in retirement.
- The Roth IRA and Roth 401(k) does not require distributions based on age. All other tax-deferred retirement plans, require withdrawals to begin by April 1 of the calendar year after the owner reaches the RMD (Required minimum distribution) age of 72 (prior to the year 2020, the RMD age was 70½). If the account holder does not need the money and wants to leave it to their heirs, a Roth can be an effective way to accumulate tax-free income. Beneficiaries who inherit Roth IRAs are subject to special minimum distribution rules.
- Roth IRAs have a higher "effective" contribution limit than traditional IRAs, since the nominal contribution limit is the same for both traditional and Roth IRAs, but the post-tax contribution in a Roth IRA is equivalent to a larger pre-tax contribution in a traditional IRA that will be taxed upon withdrawal. For example, a contribution of the 2008 limit of $5,000 to a Roth IRA would have been equivalent to a traditional IRA contribution of $6667 (assuming a 25% tax rate at both contribution and withdrawal). In 2008, one could not contribute $6667 to a traditional IRA due to the contribution limit, so the post-tax Roth contribution may be larger.
- On estates large enough to be subject to estate taxes, a Roth IRA can reduce estate taxes since tax dollars have already been subtracted. A traditional IRA is valued at the pre-tax level for estate tax purposes.
- Most employer sponsored retirement plans tend to be pre-tax dollars and are similar, in that respect, to a traditional IRA, so if additional retirement savings are made beyond an employer-sponsored plan, a Roth IRA can diversify tax risk.
- Unlike distributions from a regular IRA, qualified Roth distributions do not affect the calculation of taxable social security benefits.
- A Roth conversion includes the converted pre-tax balance in the account holder's taxable income for the year of conversion, with the tax owed based on the fair market value (FMV) of the converted assets at the time of conversion. When a self-directed IRA holds non-publicly-traded assets — such as private REITs, oil and gas partnerships, or other private placements — the FMV reported by the custodian on Form 5498 may incorporate discounts for lack of marketability or minority interest, which can reduce the conversion tax relative to the assets' undiscounted face value. Such valuations must meet the "willing buyer, willing seller" standard articulated in United States v. Cartwright, 411 U.S. 546 (1973), and underpayments attributable to a substantial valuation misstatement are subject to accuracy-related penalties under Internal Revenue Code § 6662 of 20%, doubling to 40% for gross valuation misstatements.
- Qualified distributions from a Roth IRA are not included in Modified Adjusted Gross Income (MAGI), so withdrawals in retirement do not increase Medicare Part B and Part D IRMAA surcharges. However, the Roth conversion itself is included in ordinary income and MAGI in the year of conversion, and because IRMAA is determined using a two-year lookback, a conversion can raise the account holder's Medicare premiums two years later if it pushes MAGI above an IRMAA threshold.
- Because Roth IRAs are not subject to required minimum distributions during the original owner's lifetime, converting funds from a Traditional IRA reduces the balance subject to future RMDs and the resulting taxable income in retirement.

=== Disadvantages ===
- Funds that reside in a Roth IRA cannot be used as collateral for a loan per current IRS rules and therefore cannot be used for financial leveraging or as a cash management tool for investment purposes.
- Contributions to a Roth IRA are not tax deductible. By contrast, contributions to a traditional IRA are tax deductible (within income limits). Therefore, someone who contributes to a traditional IRA instead of a Roth IRA gets an immediate tax savings equal to the amount of the contribution multiplied by their marginal tax rate while someone who contributes to a Roth IRA does not realize this immediate tax reduction. Also, by contrast, contributions to most employer sponsored retirement plans (such as a 401(k), 403(b), Simple IRA or SEP IRA) are tax deductible with no income limits because they reduce a taxpayer's adjusted gross income.
- Eligibility to contribute to a Roth IRA phases out at certain income limits. By contrast, contributions to most tax deductible employer sponsored retirement plans have no income limit.
- Contributions to a Roth IRA do not reduce a taxpayer's adjusted gross income (AGI). By contrast, contributions to a traditional IRA or most employer sponsored retirement plans reduce AGI. Reducing one's AGI has a benefit (besides reducing taxable income) if it puts the AGI below some threshold to make the taxpayer eligible for tax credits or deductions that would not be available at the higher AGI with a Roth IRA. The amount of credits and deductions may increase as the taxpayer slides down the phaseout scale. Examples include the child tax credit, the earned income credit, the student loan interest deduction.
- A Roth IRA contribution is taxed at the taxpayer's current income tax rate, which is higher than the income tax rate during retirement for most people. This is because most people have a lower income, that falls in a lower tax bracket, during retirement than during their working years. (A lower tax rate can also occur if Congress lowers income tax rates before retirement.) By contrast, contributions to traditional IRAs or employer-sponsored tax-deductible retirement plans result in an immediate tax savings equal to the taxpayer's current marginal tax bracket multiplied by the amount of the contribution. The higher the taxpayer's current marginal tax rate, the higher the potential disadvantage. However, this issue is more complicated because withdrawals from traditional IRA or employer sponsored tax deductible retirement plans are fully taxable, up to 85% of Social Security income is taxable, personal residence mortgage interest deduction decreases as the mortgage is paid down, and there may be pension plan income, investment income and other factors.
- A taxpayer who pays state income tax and who contributes to a Roth IRA (instead of a traditional IRA or a tax deductible employer sponsored retirement plan) will have to pay state income taxes on the amount contributed to the Roth IRA in the year the money is earned. However, if the taxpayer retires to a state with a lower income tax rate, or no income taxes, then the taxpayer will have given up the opportunity to avoid paying state income taxes altogether on the amount of the Roth IRA contribution by instead contributing to a traditional IRA or a tax deductible employer sponsored retirement plan, because when the contributions are withdrawn from the traditional IRA or tax deductible plan in retirement, the taxpayer will then be a resident of the low or no income tax state, and will have avoided paying the state income tax altogether as a result of moving to a different state before the income tax became due.
- The perceived tax benefit may never be realized. That is, one might not live to retirement or much beyond, in which case the tax structure of a Roth only serves to reduce an estate that may not have been subject to tax. To fully realize the tax benefit, one must live until one's Roth IRA contributions have been withdrawn and exhausted. By contrast, with a traditional IRA, tax might never be collected at all, such as if one dies before retirement with an estate below the tax threshold, or retires with income below the tax threshold. (To benefit from this exemption, the beneficiary must be named in the appropriate IRA beneficiary form. A beneficiary inheriting the IRA solely through a will is not eligible for the estate tax exemption. Additionally, the beneficiary will be subject to income tax unless the inheritance is a Roth IRA.) Heirs will have to pay taxes on withdrawals from traditional IRA assets they inherit, and must continue to take mandatory distributions over a maximum period of 10 years. It is also possible that tax laws may change by the time one reaches retirement age.

== Double taxation ==
Double taxation may still occur within these tax sheltered investment plans. For example, foreign dividends may be taxed at their point of origin, and the IRS does not recognize this tax as a creditable deduction. There is some controversy over whether this violates existing Joint Tax Treaties, such as the Convention Between Canada and the United States of America With Respect to Taxes on Income and on Capital.

For Canadians with U.S. Roth IRAs, a 2008 rule provides that Roth IRAs (as defined in section 408A of the U.S. Internal Revenue Code) and similar plans are considered to be pensions. Accordingly, distributions from a Roth IRA (as well as other similar plans) to a resident of Canada will generally be exempt from Canadian tax to the extent that they would have been exempt from U.S. tax if paid to a resident of the U.S. Additionally, a resident of Canada may elect to defer any taxation in Canada with respect to income accrued in a Roth IRA but not distributed by the Roth IRA, until and to the extent that a distribution is made from the Roth IRA or any plan substituted therefor. The effect of these rules is that, in most cases, no portion of the Roth IRA will be subject to taxation in Canada.

However, where an individual makes a contribution to a Roth IRA while they are a resident of Canada (other than rollover contributions from another Roth IRA), the Roth IRA will lose its status as a "pension" for purposes of the Treaty with respect to the accretions from the time such contribution is made. Income accretions from such time will be subject to tax in Canada in the year of accrual. In effect, the Roth IRA will be bifurcated into a "frozen" pension that will continue to enjoy the benefit of the exemption for pensions and a non-pension (essentially a savings account) that will not.

== Eligibility ==
=== Income limits ===
Congress has limited who can contribute to a Roth IRA based upon income. A taxpayer can contribute the maximum amount listed at the top of the page only if their Modified Adjusted Gross Income (MAGI) is below a certain level (the bottom of the range shown below). Otherwise, a phase-out of allowed contributions runs proportionally throughout the MAGI ranges shown below. Once MAGI hits the top of the range, no contribution is allowed at all; however, a minimum of $200 may be contributed as long as MAGI is below the top of the range. Excess Roth IRA contributions may be recharacterized into Traditional IRA contributions, generally by the due date (including extensions) of that year's tax return, as long as the combined contributions do not exceed that tax year's limit. The Roth IRA MAGI phase-out ranges for 2026 are:

- Single filers and heads of household: Up to $153,000 (to qualify for a full contribution); $153,000–$168,000 (to be eligible for a partial contribution)
- Joint filers: Up to $242,000 (to qualify for a full contribution); $242,000–$252,000 (to be eligible for a partial contribution)
- Married filing separately (if the couple lived together for any part of the year): $0 (to qualify for a full contribution); $0–$10,000 (to be eligible for a partial contribution). This range is not adjusted for inflation.

The lower number represents the point at which the taxpayer is no longer allowed to contribute the maximum yearly contribution. The upper number is the point as of which the taxpayer is no longer allowed to contribute at all. People who are married and living together, but who file separately, are only allowed to contribute a relatively small amount.

However, once a Roth IRA is established, the balance in the plan remains tax-sheltered, even if the taxpayer's income rises above the threshold. (The thresholds are just for annual eligibility to contribute, not for eligibility to maintain a Roth IRA.)

To be eligible, one must meet the earned income minimum requirement. In order to make a contribution, one must have taxable compensation (not taxable income from investments). If one makes only $2,000 in taxable compensation, one's maximum IRA contribution is $2,000.

If a taxpayer's income exceeds the income limits, they may still be able to effectively contribute by using a "backdoor" contribution process (see backdoor contributions below).

=== Contribution limits ===
Contributions to both a Roth IRA and a traditional IRA are limited to the total amount allowed for either of them. Generally, the contribution cannot exceed one's earned income for the year in question. The one exception is for a "spousal IRA" where a contribution can be made for a spouse with little or no earned income provided the other spouse has sufficient earned income and the spouses file a joint tax return.

The Roth annual maximum input increased to $7,000 as of 2024, is a $1,000 increase from prior years and $500 increase from 2023. It is highly recommended that an investor to max-out the annual input amount for maximum return; however, penalties exist for going above the maximum allowable investment amount.

=== Conversion rules ===
The government allows people to convert Traditional IRA funds (and some other untaxed IRA funds) to Roth IRA funds by paying income tax on any account balance being converted that has not already been taxed (e.g., the Traditional IRA balance minus any non-deductible contributions).

Prior to 2010, two circumstances prohibited conversions: Modified Adjusted Gross Income exceeding $100,000 or the participant's tax filing status is Married Filing Separately. These limitations were removed as part of the Tax Increase Prevention and Reconciliation Act of 2005.

==== Backdoor contributions ====
Regardless of income but subject to contribution limits, contributions can be made to a Traditional IRA and then converted to a Roth IRA. This allows for "backdoor" contributions where individuals are able to make Roth IRA contributions even if their income is above the limits.

One major caveat to the entire "backdoor" Roth IRA contribution process, however, is that it only works for people who do not have any pre-tax contributed money in IRA accounts at the time of the "backdoor" conversion to Roth; conversions made when other IRA money exists are subject to pro-rata calculations and may lead to tax liabilities on the part of the converter. In effect, one cannot choose the tax character of the contribution, as it must reflect the existing proportion of tax character in traditional IRAs. For example, for a traditional IRA containing $10,000 post-tax and $30,000 pre-tax funds, it has 75% pre-tax character. Converting $10,000 into a Roth would lead to 75% ($7,500) of the contribution being considered taxable. The pro-rata calculation is made based on all traditional IRA contributions across all the individual's traditional IRA accounts (even if they are in different institutions).

Backdoor Roth IRA contributions were explicitly allowed by the Tax Cuts and Jobs Act of 2017. Prior to that, there was concern that the process would violate the step transaction doctrine that one cannot combine individually legal steps to achieve an outcome that would be illegal if done in a single step.

=== Distributions ===
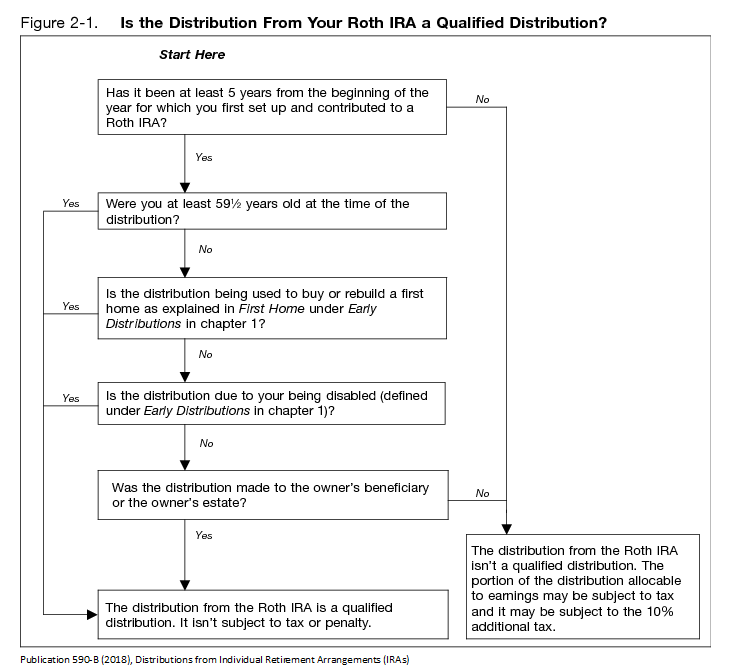
IRS decision chart for tax status of distributions

Returns of regular contributions from Roth IRA(s) are always withdrawn tax and penalty-free. Eligible (tax and penalty-free) distributions of earnings must fulfill two requirements. First, the seasoning period of five years since the opening of the Roth IRA account must have elapsed, and secondly a justification must exist such as retirement or disability. The simplest justification is reaching 59.5 years of age, at which point qualified withdrawals may be made in any amount on any schedule. Becoming disabled or being a "first time" home buyer can provide justification for limited qualified withdrawals. Finally, although one can take distributions from a Roth IRA under the substantially equal periodic payments (SEPP) rule without paying a 10% penalty, any interest earned in the IRA will be subject to tax – a substantial penalty which forfeits the primary tax benefits of the Roth IRA.

=== Inherited Roth IRAs ===
When a spouse inherits a Roth IRA:

- the spouse can combine the Roth IRA with his or her own Roth IRA
- the spouse can make contributions and otherwise control the account
- required minimum distributions do not apply
- income tax does not apply to distributions
- estate tax (if any) does not apply at the time of transfer

When a non-spouse inherits a Roth IRA:

- the non-spouse cannot combine the Roth IRA with his or her own
- the non-spouse cannot make additional contributions
- required minimum distributions apply
- income tax does not apply to distributions, if the Roth IRA was established for at least five years before the distribution occurs.
- estate tax (if any) applies

In addition, the beneficiary may elect to choose from one of two methods of distribution. The first option is to receive the entire distribution by December 31 of the fifth year following the year of the IRA owner's death. The second option is to receive portions of the IRA as distributions over the life of the beneficiary, terminating upon the death of the beneficiary and passing on to a secondary beneficiary. If the beneficiary of the Roth IRA is a trust, the trust must distribute the entire assets of the Roth IRA by December 31 of the fifth year following the year of the IRA owner's death, unless there is a "Look Through" clause, in which case the distributions of the Roth IRA are based on the Single Life Expectancy table over the life of the beneficiary, terminating upon the death of the beneficiary. Subtract one from the "Single Life Expectancy" for each successive year. The age of the beneficiary is determined on 12/31 of the first year after the year that the owner died.

== See also ==
- Retirement plans in the United States
- Comparison of 401(k) and IRA accounts – 401(k) & IRA comparisons (401(k) vs Roth 401( k) vs Traditional IRA vs Roth IRA)
- Form 1099-R
- Coverdell Education Savings Account – sometimes termed the "Roth IRA for Education", describes tax-sheltered savings accounts for college.
- Substantially equal periodic payments (SEPP) – an exception to the age 59.5 rule
- myRA – a 2014 Obama administration initiative based on the Roth IRA
- Tax-free savings account in Canada since 2008
- Individual savings account in the United Kingdom since 1999
