= Self-directed IRA =

Form of retirement plan

A self-directed individual retirement arrangement (SDIRA) in the United States is a descriptive term that describes an individual retirement arrangement (IRA) which allows alternative investments for retirement savings. All IRA types (traditional, Roth, SEP and SIMPLE) can be self-directed. Some examples of these alternative investments are real estate, private mortgages, private company stock, oil and gas limited partnerships, precious metals, digital assets, horses and livestock, and intellectual property. The increased investment options available in self-directed IRAs prompted the SEC to issue a public notice in 2011 due an increased risk of fraud in alternative assets.

Internal Revenue Service (IRS) regulations require that a qualified trustee or custodian hold IRA assets on behalf of the IRA owner. The trustee/custodian provides custody of the assets, processes all transactions, maintains other records pertaining to them, files required IRS reports, issues client statements, helps clients understand the rules and regulations pertaining to certain prohibited transactions, and performs other administrative duties on behalf of the self-directed IRA owner.

The account owner of all IRAs chooses among the investment options allowed by the IRA custodian. In addition to Internal Revenue Code (IRC) restrictions, IRA custodians are allowed to restrict the types of assets they will offer to their IRA owners. For most IRAs offered by banks and brokerage houses, these investment options are predominately publicly-traded securities including company shares, bonds, and mutual funds, but with a self-directed IRA at a custodian that handles alternative assets, the term "self-directed" refers to offering a broader range of investments, namely alternatives, that the IRS allows in IRAs.

== Permitted investments ==
The Internal Revenue Code does not describe what a self-directed IRA can invest in, only what it cannot invest in. Internal Revenue Code Sections 408 and 4975 prohibit disqualified persons from engaging in certain types of transactions. Some of the investment options permitted under the regulations include real estate, company shares, mortgages, franchises, partnerships, certain qualified precious metals, private equity, and tax liens. While the type of investment allowed in an IRA is broadly defined, the SEC has issued an investor alert explaining why using this type of IRA might present increased risk of fraud.

Business investments may include partnerships, joint ventures, and private stock. This can be a platform to fund a start-up business or other for-profit venture that is managed by someone other than the account owner of the IRA. However, using a self-directed IRA to invest in an active trade or business via a pass-through entity such as an LLC or partnership can trigger a tax as the income generated would be treated as unrelated business income, subject to the unrelated business income tax (UBIT).

A self-directed IRA can hold precious metals, which are typically held by a third-party custodian. The regulations pertaining to investing in precious metals are in Section 408(m)(3) of the Internal Revenue Code. There are exceptions for certain gold, silver, or platinum coins, as well as certain coins issued by a State treasury. Permissible coins include American Eagle coins, Canadian Maple Leaf coins, and Australian Koala bullion coins. In order for coins to be held inside an IRA, coins must satisfy a certain level of pureness in their mineral content so that they are not viewed as a type of collector's coin. As a result, Double Eagle gold coins (minted in the United States in the nineteenth and early twentieth centuries) and South African Krugerrands are disallowed because they do not meet this standard. Bullion is also permissible if it meets a standard level of fineness and is produced by a COMEX or NYMEX approved refiner.

An IRA can purchase any type of real estate as long as the provider (aka custodian) of that IRA handles real estate. IRA providers that handle real estate are often called self-directed IRA providers. If the IRA does not have enough cash to pay the full purchase price, then the IRA can partner with a person, company/entity, or another IRA, or it can secure a non-recourse loan to buy real estate. Whether the IRA is whole or part owner, IRA funds are used for purchase, maintenance, and expenses. The funds that can be used include taxes, bills, and homeowner association (HOA) fees. When the property generates cash either with rental income or from a sale, those funds go directly back to the IRA. The IRS prohibits certain actions. For example, neither the IRA holder nor any disqualified persons (including family members) to that plan may live in or vacation in the property. The IRA holder makes the decisions about how the asset is maintained but cannot do the work themselves.

IRA funds are allowed to be invested in private companies. The IRS puts restrictions on private investments that can be made by an IRA. It cannot purchase stock that the IRA holder already owns. Earnings from the entity may be subject to UBIT if the company has earnings from debt or has earnings from the sale of products or services. In most cases, neither the IRA holder nor any disqualified persons to the plan can be employed by the company while the IRA has an equity position in that company. The IRA cannot be a general partner in an LP or LLP, and it cannot invest in an S-corporation. Unlike prohibited transactions that are rules governing IRAs, the restriction on IRA investment in an S-corporation is an IRS S-corporation rule. An entity is not eligible for Subchapter S taxation if it has IRA shareholders, and its S-corporation election would be terminated if an IRA becomes a shareholder.

The IRS allows IRAs and other retirement accounts to make loans. The IRA holder assumes the responsibility of choosing the borrower, principal amount, interest rate, length of the term, payment frequency, and amount of the loan. The holder also negotiates whether or not the note will be secured.

Other self-directed IRA investments are often chosen by the IRA holder's expertise in a certain area of investing. The self-directed IRA is very popular with retirement investors looking to invest in real estate and cryptocurrency investments.

== Prohibited transactions ==
IRS regulations prohibit transactions that are an improper use of the value in the account or annuity by the account owner, the account owner's beneficiary, or any other disqualified persons, as defined under Internal Revenue Code Section 4975. Such transactions would allow a disqualified person to bypass the rules relating to distributions and receive immediate benefit from the account, defeating its purpose as a long-term savings account. Understanding the rules on prohibited transactions is particularly important for the owner of a self-directed IRA, who has a wider choice of investment assets than the owner of an institutional IRA; the IRS cautions that the risk of a prohibited transaction may be increased when an IRA invests in nonpublicly traded assets or assets the owner directly controls. In general, the IRA should not deal in any asset or business that benefits the owner, a relative of the owner, or anyone providing services to the account (except in accordance with fiduciary duty).

The self-dealing and conflict-of-interest types of prohibited transactions, as outlined in IRC sections 4975(c)(1)(D) and 4975(c)(1)(E), are the broadest and most complex categories of prohibited transaction. To trigger a self-dealing or conflict of interest transaction, the IRS simply has to show that a disqualified person received some direct or indirect personal benefit. If the account owner or beneficiary engaged in a prohibited transaction, the account is treated as distributing all its assets to the IRA holder at their fair market values on the first day of the year in which the transaction occurred. The distribution would be subject to any taxes or penalties associated with an early distribution; generally, a 10% early withdrawal penalty and treatment of the distribution as ordinary income for the purposes of income taxes.

== Prohibited asset types ==
Internal Revenue Code Section 408 prohibits IRA investments in life insurance and in collectibles, such as artwork, rugs, antiques, metals (there are exceptions for certain kinds of bullion), gems, stamps, coins, alcoholic beverages, and certain other tangible personal property. Life insurance is prohibited as it is designed to benefit an individual's heirs, who are disqualified from directly benefiting from a self-directed IRA. Collectibles are prohibited as they are difficult to value.

== Checkbook control ==
Checkbook control, also called a "checkbook IRA," is one strategy for a self-directed IRA where the account holder personally executes the investments. In this approach, the taxpayer establishes and manages a limited liability company (LLC) that has the IRA as its only investor. The taxpayer contributes to the IRA with instructions to invest the contribution into the LLC. After this is done, the taxpayer can personally conduct investment transactions on behalf of the LLC. The IRA custodian has no involvement in these internal transactions, but deals only with contributions and distributions. Although the IRS challenged checkbook control as an unlawful self-dealing arrangement, its argument was rejected by the United States Tax Court in Swanson v. Commissioner (1996).

== See also ==
- 403(b)
- Comparison of 401(k) and IRA accounts
- Roth 401(k)
- Rollovers as Business Start-Ups
- Self-invested personal pension in the United Kingdom
