= MyRA =

Roth IRA account

myRA ("my retirement account") is a type of Roth IRA account sponsored by the United States Treasury and administered by Comerica. Richard Ludlow was the executive director of the program for the U.S. Treasury.

A simplified retirement plan aimed at those who can afford only small monthly contributions, MyRA was a component of the U.S. government's "Opportunity for All" plan, which has a goal of "ensuring middle class Americans feel secure in their jobs, homes and budgets."

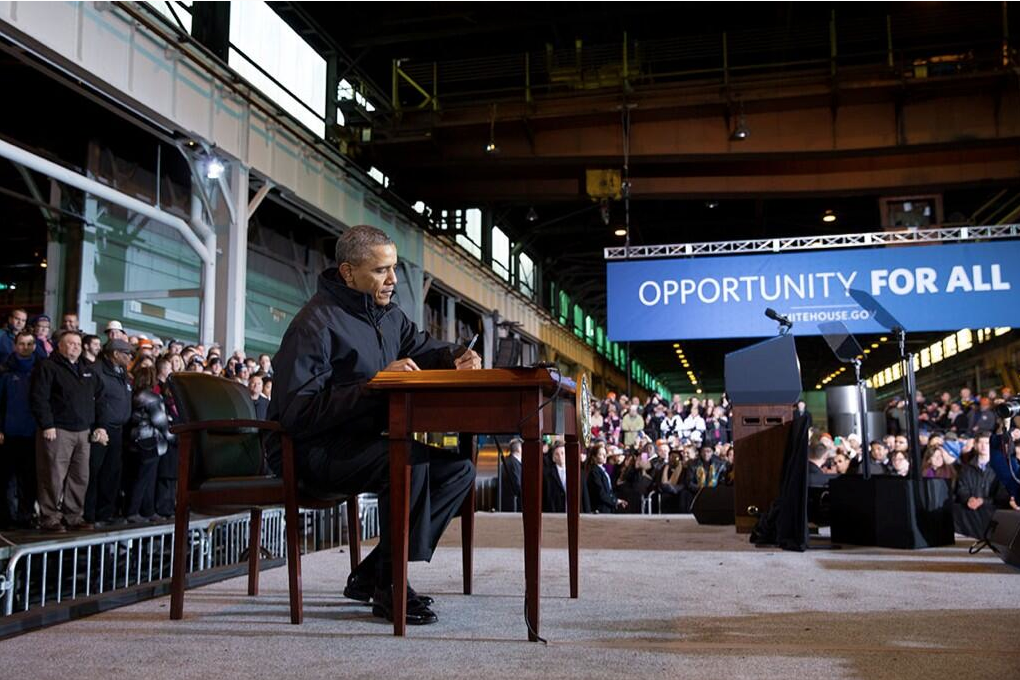
President Obama signing MyRA at the Irvin Plant of U.S. Steel near Pittsburgh.

In July 2017, the Treasury Department announced that the program would be phased out. Deposits are no longer accepted as of December 4, 2017

== History ==
The myRA program was announced on January 28, 2014, by President Barack Obama during the 2014 State of the Union Address, stating:

Let's do more to help Americans save for retirement. Today, most workers don't have a pension. A Social Security check often isn't enough on its own. And while the stock market has doubled over the last five years, that doesn't help folks who don't have 401ks. That's why, tomorrow, I will direct the Treasury to create a new way for working Americans to start their own retirement savings: MyRA. It's a new savings bond that encourages folks to build a nest egg. MyRA guarantees a decent return with no risk of losing what you put in.

— President Obama

The President signed the memo in a public ceremony at U.S. Steel's Irvin plant in the Pittsburgh suburb of West Mifflin, Pennsylvania on January 28, 2014. In late 2014, a pilot version of the program launched with approximately 60 employers participating, allowing for testing and feedback. Approximately 3,000 myRA accounts were opened during the pilot phase, and average individual contributions during the pilot were around $20-$50 per month. On December 15, 2014, the United States Treasury published the final regulations governing the myRA accounts. The Treasury finally declared the program ready to use and available across the country in November 2015.

In July 2017, the Treasury Department announced that the program would be phased out in the following months due to lack of participation relative to the costs of maintaining it. At the time, there were 20,000 myRA accounts, and the median account balance was $500. There were also 10,000 myRA accounts with zero balances. As of that date, myRA participants had contributed $34 million to their myRA accounts since the program's inception. The Treasury Department notified MyRA account holders of the phase out of myRA and encouraged account holder to move their myRA account balances to a Roth IRA. The Treasury Department had spent an average of $23 million per year to maintain the program since its inception. Deposits are no longer accepted as of December 4, 2017

== Program specifics ==
The myRA was a "new type of saving bond that we can set up without legislation" guaranteed to have a decent return, by holding an "add on" Treasury security in a Roth IRA, with contributions after taxes and lifetime growth to be tax free. The maximum annual contribution is $5,500, including any Roth and Traditional IRA contributions. When a myRA account reaches either $15,000 in value or 30 years of age (whichever comes first), it will roll into a private-sector retirement account. The initial investment can be as low as $25, and one can make periodic investments for as little as $5 every time one gets paid. There was no cost to open a new account, and ongoing automatic payroll deductions to fund a myRA can be any amount. The only investment option was the G Fund of government securities in the Thrift Savings Plan for Federal and US Military employees.

Households making under $191,000 a year could open a myRA account, and invest with variable interest rates similar to the Thrift Savings Plan. Employers will not contribute to or administer employees' accounts; they will only facilitate the setup of employees' payroll direct deposits.

== Response ==
A 2014 survey found that 78 percent of Millennials would enroll in a myRA if eligible. An analysis by Wyatt Investment Research concluded that, while the myRA wasn't perfect, "anything that gets millions of people to start saving for retirement has to be a good thing."

The myRA has been skeptically received by retirement planning professionals due to the low returns it will offer. CNBC has noted that "overcoming the traditional IRA $1,000 minimum may not be just one of the reasons for low-income workers to invest in a myRA—it may be the only reason." John Wasik of Forbes characterized the myRA as "a decent idea, but not needed," noting that all of the benefits of the myRA were already available through other investment vehicles and lamenting the lack of hedge against inflation that can devalue government treasuries. An article on The Motley Fool described the plan as "better than nothing -- but worse than most", in particular criticizing the lack of investment options (only the Government Securities Fund of the Thrift Savings Plan), low rate of return (about 2-3% annually vs. the benchmark S&P 500 which has average annual growth of about 10%), and $15,000 cap after which the myRA account stops accumulating interest.

Some on the political left have criticized the myRA for feeding "risky IRA-style investment accounts that divert savings into the stock market." An editorial by Jessie Myerson on Mediaite, meanwhile, blasted the myRA as something that "unnecessarily skims off of workers' wages so money managers can extract fees" (without addressing specifically what fees, if any, he would consider appropriate) and furthermore argues that Americans don't need to save money due to "the vast majority of dollars [being] digital entries in spreadsheets, spent into existence by the federal government by a keystroke".

However, the MyRA differs in that funds can only be invested in the "G" option of the government's Thrift Savings Plan. This investment is guaranteed by the government and has a fairly low rate of return as it tracks government bonds. This makes the fund less than ideal for long term savings.
