= Required minimum distribution =

Withdrawals from retirement accounts required by U.S. law

Required minimum distributions (RMDs) are minimum amounts that U.S. tax law requires one to withdraw annually from traditional Individual Retirement Accounts (IRAs) and employer-sponsored retirement plans and pay income tax on that withdrawal. In the Internal Revenue Code itself, the precise term is "minimum required distribution". Retirement planners, tax practitioners, and publications of the Internal Revenue Service (IRS) often use the phrase "required minimum distribution".

== Lifetime distributions ==
Individuals with IRAs are required to begin withdrawing a minimum amount from their IRAs no later than April 1 of the year following the year in which they reach age 72. (Note: The age is 73 for individuals who attain age 72 after December 31, 2022. The age is 72 for individuals who attain age 70½ after December 31, 2019. The age is 70½ for individuals who attained age 70½ on or before December 31, 2019, as a result of the SECURE Act of 2019.) They can always withdraw more than the minimum amount from their IRA or plan in any year, but if they withdraw less than the required minimum, they will be subject to a federal penalty. The monetary penalty is an excise tax equal to 50% (for years prior to 2023) or 25% (for 2023 and after) of the amount they should have withdrawn, plus interest. This penalty is in addition to the ordinary income tax assessed at the individual's marginal rate and any state income taxes. IRA owners do not have to take lifetime distributions from Roth IRAs, but after-death distributions (below) are required.

The RMD rules are designed to spread out the distributions of one's entire interest in an IRA or plan account over one's life expectancy or the joint life expectancy of the individual and his or her beneficiaries. The purpose of the RMD rules is to ensure that people do not accumulate retirement accounts, defer taxation, and leave these retirement funds as an inheritance. Instead, required minimum distributions force the holder to withdraw at least some of the funds as taxable distributions while still alive.

Unlike most distributions from IRAs and qualified plans, RMDs are never eligible for rollover; they must be withdrawn. Because the distributions are not rollover-eligible, however, taxes are not required to be withheld at the time of distribution, and may thus be postponed until the individual files a Federal income tax return for the year. Any amount withdrawn above the minimum required amount will be eligible for rollover within 60 days of the distribution. Income tax must be withheld from that portion if the rollover option is not elected.

Income tax is generally not due on any part of the RMD from an IRA which is paid to a charity. These are called Qualified Charitable Distributions (QCD).

Employer-sponsored qualified retirement plans, such as 401(k) plans, require the same distributions that IRAs do. The beginning date requirement may be later than the date for IRAs. Although the rules require RMDs to begin by April 1 of the year after the individual reaches age 72, participants in an employer-sponsored plan can usually wait until April 1 of the year after retirement (if later than age 72) to begin distributions unless the individual owns 5% or more of the employer who is sponsoring the plan.

In addition, employer-sponsored plans differ from IRAs in rules relating to aggregation. A person with multiple IRAs may add the balances in each account to determine the total RMD for the year, then take that full amount from a single IRA, or split it in any manner between two or more IRAs. However, employer-sponsored plans must remain distinct; the RMD calculation for each is performed separately, and the distributions must be taken from each plan individually. Exception: If the individual has more than one 403(b) tax-sheltered annuity account, the individual can total the RMDs and then take them from any one (or more) of the tax-sheltered annuities

== After death distributions ==
Distributions after death must be made to the named beneficiaries of the decedent's IRA or qualified plan. Legislation passed in 2006 allows qualified retirement plans to be amended to offer a "nonspouse rollover". If the rollover is available, a beneficiary may make a direct transfer of the funds to an inherited IRA, which must be in the name of the decedent for the benefit of the named beneficiary. This became effective beginning in 2007.

IRA beneficiaries do not require a nonspouse rollover; an IRA beneficiary can have a decedent's IRA retitled as an inherited IRA without a rollover transaction. (Spouses have much greater rollover rights and can delay distributions until they are age 72 if they choose.) A nonspouse IRA beneficiary must either begin distributions by the end of the year following the decedent's death (they can elect a "stretch" payout if they do this) or, if the decedent died before April 1 of the year after he/she would have been 72, the beneficiary can follow the "5-year rule". The suspension of the RMD requirements for 2009 also meant that when counting the 5-year rule, 2009 was disregarded.

=== The 5-year rule ===
Under the 5-year rule, the entire account balance must be withdrawn over a 5-year period. The rule does not require a certain amount each year, or an even division between the five years. However, with the 5-year distribution method, the entire remaining balance becomes a required distribution in the fifth year. If a decedent has named his/her estate or a charity as a beneficiary and the 5-year rule applies, no "stretch" payout is possible. If an estate or charity is a beneficiary of a part of the account, the same holds true unless certain remedial measures are taken by September 30 of the year after death.

The 5-year rule does not apply if the decedent died after having started his/her required minimum distributions (generally if he/she died later than April 1 after reaching age 72). In that case, there is no 5-year rule, and the beneficiary takes distributions over the length of his/her own life expectancy or the remaining life expectancy that the decedent would have had (using government tables). If the IRA owner named a non-person (such as his estate) as the beneficiary and had died after beginning required minimum distributions, then the estate or other non-person beneficiary may take distributions over the remaining life expectancy the decedent would have had.

If the decedent died before age 72 and the beneficiary does not start a lifetime payout by the end of the year after the death, the 5-year rule does apply. Also, if the decedent died before that date and had no beneficiary (for example if he/she named the estate as beneficiary or a charity) the 5-year rule applies. Many retirement plans also trigger the 5-year rule.

== Overview ==
This is an overview of rules based on Internal Revenue Code Section 401(a)(9). The rules are detailed at Treas. Regs. 1.401(a)(9)-1 to -9 and 1.408-8. The nonspouse rollover rules were passed in Section 829 of the Pension Protection Act of 2006 and interpreted by IRS Notice 2007-7, 2007-5 IRB 1.

== See also ==
- Retirement
