= Form 1099-R =

IRS tax form for reporting distributions

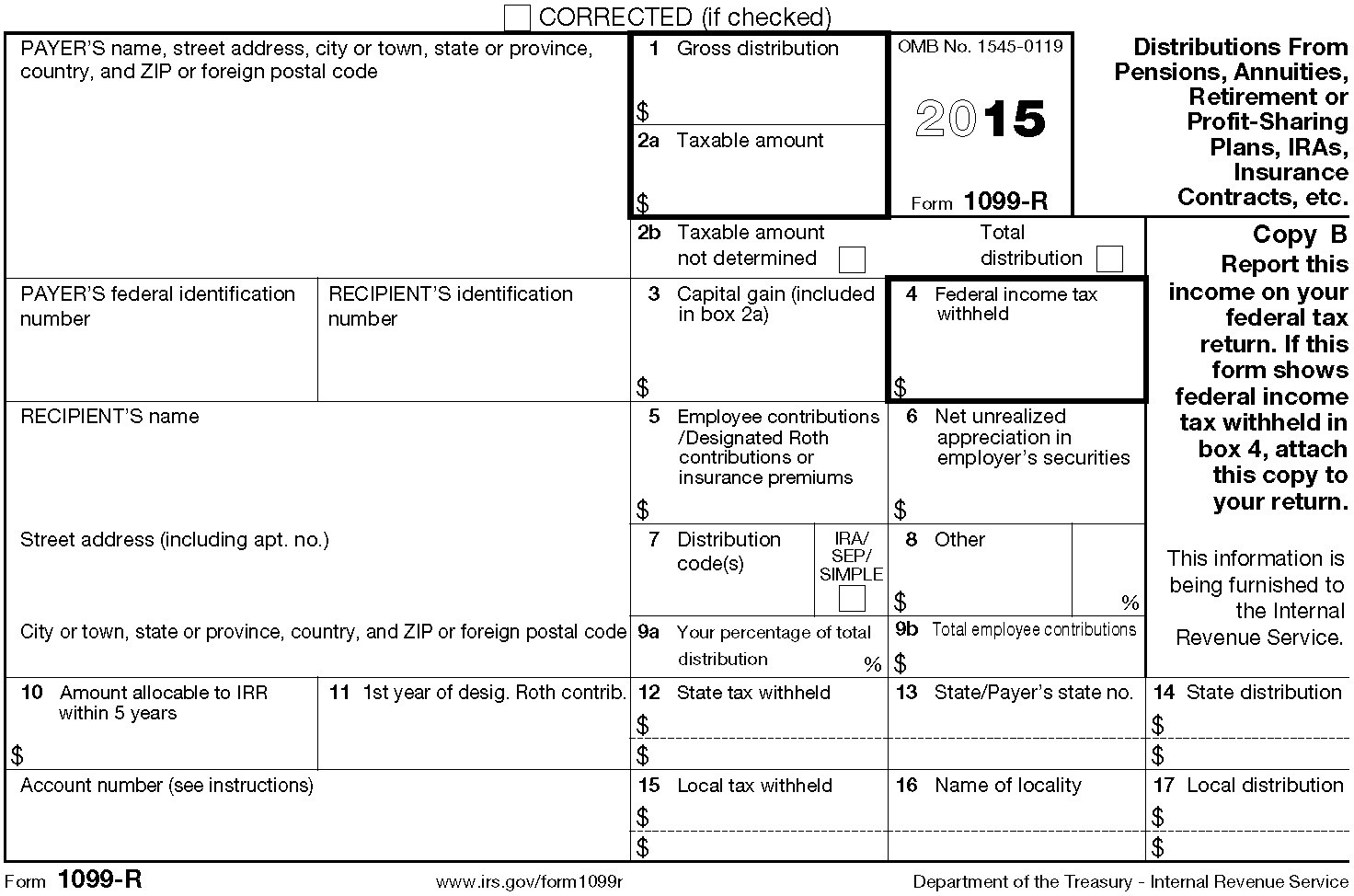
Form 1099-R, 2015

In the United States, Form 1099-R is a variant of Form 1099 used for reporting on distributions from pensions, annuities, retirement or profit sharing plans, IRAs, charitable gift annuities and Insurance Contracts. Form 1099-R is filed for each person who has received a distribution of $10 or more from any of the above.

Items included on the form are the gross distribution, the amount of the distribution that is taxable, the amount withheld for tax purposes, and a code that represents the type of distribution made to plan holder.

== Filing ==
Form 1099-R must be mailed to the recipients by January 31 and to the IRS by the last day of February. If the custodian files with the IRS electronically, the form is due by March 31. The plan owner, the IRS and the municipal or state tax department (if applicable) all receive a copy of the form. These copies are used to cross-reference individual tax returns to ensure compliance. Any person who receives an erroneous 1099-R form should immediately contact the plan custodian who sent it in order to rectify the situation and avoid filing an incorrect tax return. Beginning with returns required to be filed on or after January 1, 2024, electronic filing is mandatory for any filer submitting ten or more information returns of any type in the aggregate, a threshold lowered from 250 by Treasury Decision 9972 under authority granted by the Taxpayer First Act of 2019.

=== Taxable amount ===
If no after-tax contributions were made to the pension plan before distribution, such as if the plan is a traditional IRA, the entire distribution is generally included as taxable income. In cases where after-tax contributions were made to an annuity or pension, only a portion of the distribution may be taxed. For periodic payments from a qualified plan, the tax-free portion is generally recovered through the Simplified Method described in IRS Publication 575, which divides the after-tax cost basis by an age-based factor to produce a fixed monthly exclusion until the entire basis has been recovered.

Box 2a contains the amount of the distribution that is taxable. When the payer cannot determine the taxable amount, Box 2a may be left blank and the "Taxable amount not determined" checkbox in Box 2b is marked instead; this occurs frequently for federal annuitants in the first year of retirement, where cost-basis records are incomplete, or following disability retirement, in which case the recipient must calculate the taxable share on the personal return. The taxable amount will be zero if the entire distribution is any of the following:

- A direct rollover (other than an IRR) from a qualified plan, a section 403(b) plan, or a governmental section 457(b) plan to another such plan or to a traditional IRA;
- A direct rollover from a designated Roth account, such as a Roth 401(k), to a Roth IRA;
- A traditional, SEP, or SIMPLE IRA directly transferred to an accepting employer plan;
- An IRA recharacterization;
- A nontaxable section 1035 exchange of life insurance, annuity, endowment or long-term care insurance contracts;
- A nontaxable charge or payment, for the purchase of a qualified long-term care insurance contract, against the cash value of an annuity contract or the cash surrender value of a life insurance contract.

=== Distribution codes ===
The following table provides information on all the possible distribution codes in Box 7 of Form 1099-R.

| Distribution code | Explanation |
|---|---|
| 1 | Early distribution, no known exception (in most cases, under age 59½). |
| 2 | Early distribution, exception applies (under age 59½). |
| 3 | Disability. |
| 4 | Death. (Regardless of the age of the employee/taxpayer to indicate to a decedent's beneficiary, including an estate or trust. Also used for death benefit payments made by an employer but not made as part of a pension, profit-sharing, or retirement plan.) |
| 5 | Prohibited transaction. (This generally means the account is no longer an IRA.) |
| 6 | Section 1035 exchange (a tax-free exchange of life insurance, annuity, qualified long-term care insurance, or endowment contracts). |
| 7 | Normal distribution. |
| 8 | Excess contributions plus earnings/excess deferrals (and/or earnings) taxable in the current year. |
| 9 | Cost of current life insurance protection. |
| A | May be eligible for 10-year tax option (see Form 4972). |
| B | Designated Roth account distribution. (Note: If code B is in box 7 and an amount is reported in box 11, see the instructions for Form 5329.) |
| C | Reportable death benefits under section 6050Y. |
| D | Annuity payments from nonqualified annuities that may be subject to tax under section 1411. |
| E | Distributions under Employee Plan Compliance Resolution System (EPCRS). |
| F | Charitable gift annuity. |
| G | Direct rollover of a distribution (other than a designated Roth account distribution) to a qualified plan, a section 403(b) plan, a governmental section 457(b) plan, or an IRA. |
| H | Direct rollover of a designated Roth account distribution to a Roth IRA. |
| J | Early distribution from a Roth IRA, no known exception (in most cases, under age 59½). |
| L | Loans treated as distributions. |
| M | Qualified plan loan offset. |
| N | Recharacterized IRA contribution made for the current year and recharacterized in the current year. |
| P | Excess contributions plus earnings/excess deferrals (and/or earnings) taxable in the prior year. |
| Q | Qualified distribution from a Roth IRA (where the participant meets the 5-year holding period and has reached age 59½, has died, or is disabled). |
| R | Recharacterized IRA contribution made for the prior year and recharacterized in the current year. |
| S | Early distribution from a SIMPLE IRA in first 2 years, no known exception (under age 59½). |
| T | Roth IRA distribution, exception applies. |
| U | Dividend distribution from ESOP under section 404(k). (Note: This distribution isn't eligible for rollover.) |
| W | Charges or payments for purchasing qualified long-term care insurance contracts under combined arrangements. |

== Relation to other forms ==
Form 1099-R reports the gross distribution from the custodian and how much of that amount is taxable. The plan owner uses this information to fill out lines 15 and 16 on Form 1040. Copy B of Form 1099-R is attached to Form 1040 only if federal income tax is withheld in box 4 of Form 1099-R.

With regards to IRAs, Form 1099-R is used for reporting distributions from an IRA while Form 5498 is used for reporting contributions to an IRA. Income earned (such as interest and dividends) through an IRA is not reported on either Form 1099-R or Form 5498.

Form RRB-1099-R "Pension and Annuity Income by the Railroad Retirement Board" is the Railroad Retirement Board counterpart to Form 1099-R.

Form W-4P "Withholding Certificate for Pension or Annuity Payments" is filed by payment recipients to inform payers the correct amount of tax to withhold from their payments. This amount is reported on Form 1099-R.

== See also ==
- IRS Tax Forms
- Taxation in the United States
