= Individual retirement account =

Form of individual retirement plan

An individual retirement account (IRA) in the United States is a type of retirement savings plan offered by many financial institutions that provides tax advantages for retirement savings. It is a trust that holds investment assets purchased with a taxpayer's earned income for the taxpayer's eventual benefit in old age. An individual retirement account is a type of individual retirement arrangement as described in IRS Publication 590, Individual Retirement Arrangements (IRAs). Other arrangements include individual retirement annuities and employer-established benefit trusts.

== Types ==
There are several types of IRAs:

- Traditional IRA – Contributions are mostly tax-deductible (often simplified as "money is deposited before tax" or "contributions are made with pre-tax assets"), no transactions within the IRA are taxed, and withdrawals in retirement are taxed as income (except for those portions of the withdrawal corresponding to contributions that were not deducted). Depending upon the nature of the contribution, a traditional IRA may be a "deductible IRA" or a "non-deductible IRA". Traditional IRAs were introduced with the Employee Retirement Income Security Act of 1974 (ERISA) as a retirement saving option for self-employed individuals and others without access to an employer plan. The Economic Recovery Tax Act of 1981 opened it to all taxpayers.
- Roth IRA – Contributions are non-deductible and transactions within the IRA have no tax impact. The contributions may be withdrawn at any time without penalty, and earnings may be withdrawn tax-free in retirement. The Roth IRA was created by the Taxpayer Relief Act of 1997. It is named after its proponent, Senator William V. Roth Jr. (not an acronym, as often assumed).
  - myRA – a 2014 Obama administration initiative based on the Roth IRA, which can invest only in government bonds; phased out in 2017.
- SEP IRA – a provision that allows an employer (typically a small business or self-employed individual) to make retirement plan contributions into a Traditional IRA established in the employee's name, instead of to a pension fund in the company's name.
- SIMPLE IRA – a Savings Incentive Match Plan for Employees that requires employer matching contributions to the plan whenever an employee makes a contribution. The plan is similar to a 401(k) plan, but with lower contribution limits and simpler (and thus less costly) administration. Although it is termed an IRA, it is treated separately.
- Conduit IRA – a traditional IRA funded exclusively with a transfer from a qualified plan, such as a 401(k) plan.

Conduit IRAs have fallen in use due to 2001 legislation that allowed for direct transfers between qualified plans without an intermediate IRA, but plan administrators may choose to accept transfers only from conduit IRAs. Transferring funds from a qualified plan to a conduit IRA preserves certain tax and asset protection advantages that apply to the qualified plan.

A self-directed IRA is considered the same by the tax code, but refers to IRAs where the custodian allows the investor wider flexibility in choosing investments, typically including alternative investments. Some examples of these alternative investments are: real estate, private mortgages, private company stock, oil and gas limited partnerships, precious metals, horses, and intellectual property. While the Internal Revenue Code (IRC) has placed a few restrictions on what can be invested in, the IRA custodian may impose additional restrictions on what assets they will custody. Self-directed IRA custodians, or IRA custodians who specialize in alternative investments, are better equipped to handle transactions involving alternative investments.

Some IRA custodians and some investment funds specialize in socially responsible investing, sometimes using public environmental, social and corporate governance ratings.

Starting with the Economic Growth and Tax Relief Reconciliation Act of 2001 (EGTRRA), many of the restrictions of what type of funds could be rolled into an IRA and what type of plans IRA funds could be rolled into were significantly relaxed. Additional legislation since 2001 has further relaxed restrictions. Essentially, most retirement plans can be rolled into an IRA after meeting certain criteria, and most retirement plans can accept funds from an IRA. An example of an exception is a non-governmental 457 plan which cannot be rolled into anything but another non-governmental 457 plan.

The tax treatment of the above types of IRAs (except for Roth IRAs) are very similar, particularly for rules regarding distributions. SEP IRAs and SIMPLE IRAs also have additional rules similar to those for qualified plans governing how contributions can and must be made and what employees are qualified to participate.

== Custodians ==
Custodians can include:

- Banks
- Credit unions
- Mutual fund companies, sometimes for the purpose of offering their own mutual funds
- Brokerage firms, either independent or "captive" (affiliated with a specific mutual fund or insurance company)
- Life insurance companies

== Funding ==
Individual retirement arrangements were introduced in 1974 with the enactment of the Employee Retirement Income Security Act (ERISA). Taxpayers could contribute up to fifteen percent of their annual income or $1,500 each year, whichever was less, and reduce their taxable income by the amount of their contributions. The contributions could be invested in a special United States bond paying six percent interest, annuities that begin paying upon reaching age 59, or a trust maintained by a bank or an insurance company.

Initially, ERISA restricted IRAs to workers who were not covered by a qualified employment-based retirement plan. In 1981, the Economic Recovery Tax Act (ERTA) allowed all working taxpayers under the age of 70 to contribute to an IRA, regardless of their coverage under a qualified plan. It also raised the maximum annual contribution to $2,000 and allowed participants to contribute $250 on behalf of a nonworking spouse.

The Tax Reform Act of 1986 phased out the deduction for IRA contributions among workers covered by an employment-based retirement plan who earned more than $35,000 if single or over $50,000 if married filing jointly. Other taxpayers could still make nondeductible contributions to an IRA.

The maximum amount allowed as an IRA contribution was $1,500 from 1975 to 1981, $2,000 from 1982 to 2001, $3,000 from 2002 to 2004, $4,000 from 2005 to 2007, $5,000 from 2008 to 2012, $5,500 from 2013 to 2018, and $6,000 from 2019 to 2022. In tax year 2023, the maximum amount allowed was $6,500. Beginning in tax year 2024, the limit was $7,000. Beginning in tax year 2026, the limit was $7,500. Beginning in 2002, those over 50 years old could make an additional contribution of up to $1,000 called a "catch-up contribution".

Current limitations:

- The IRS allows an investor to revoke a new IRA, without penalty, for seven calendar days after opening it.
- An IRA can be funded only with cash or cash equivalents. Attempting to transfer any other type of asset into the IRA is a prohibited transaction and disqualifies the fund from its beneficial tax treatment.
- Additionally, an IRA (or any other tax-advantaged retirement plan) can be funded only with what the IRS calls "taxable compensation". This in turn means that certain types of income cannot be used to contribute to an IRA; these include but are not limited to:
  - Any unearned taxable income.
  - Any tax-exempt income, apart from military combat pay.
    - Social Security payments, whether retirement pensions or disability payments, may or may not be taxable, but in either case are not eligible.
  - Child support payments received. (On the other hand, alimony and separate maintenance payments, if taxable, are eligible.)
- Rollovers, transfers, and conversions between IRAs and other retirement arrangements can include any asset.
- The total contributions a person can make to all of their traditional and Roth IRAs cannot be more than the lesser amount of either their earned income for the year or $6,000 ($7,000 if the contributor is age 50 or older). The latter figure is examined annually to determine if an inflationary adjustment is needed and has been in effect from 2019 to 2021. It may have been updated for 2026 to $7,500.
- This limit applies to the total annual contributions to both Roth IRAs and traditional IRAs. For example, a person aged 45, who put $4,000 into a traditional IRA this year so far, can either put $2,000 more into this traditional IRA, or $2,000 in a Roth IRA, or some combination of those.
- The amount of the traditional IRA contributions that can be deducted is partially reduced for levels of income beyond a threshold, and eliminated beyond another threshold, if the contributor or the contributor's spouse is covered by an employer-based retirement plan. The dollar amounts of the thresholds vary depending on tax filing status (single, married, etc.) and on which spouse is covered at work (see IRS Publication 590-A, "Contributions to Individual Retirement Arrangements (IRAs)").

== Restricted investments ==
Once money is inside an IRA, the IRA owner can direct the custodian to use the cash to purchase most types of publicly traded securities (traditional investments), and non-publicly traded securities (alternative investments). Specific assets such as collectibles (e.g., art, baseball cards, and rare coins) and life insurance cannot be held in an IRA. The U.S. Internal Revenue Code (IRC) only outlines what is not allowed in an IRA. Some assets are allowed according to the IRC, but the custodians may add additional restrictions for accounts held in their custody. For example, the IRC allows an IRA to own a piece of rental property, but certain custodians may not allow this to be held in their custody.

While there are only a few restrictions on what can be invested inside an IRA, some restrictions pertain to actions which would create a prohibited transaction with those investments. For example, an IRA can own a piece of rental real estate, but the IRA owner cannot receive or provide any immediate benefit from/to this real estate investment. An example of such benefit would be the use of the real estate as the owner's personal residence, allowing a parent to live in the property, or allowing the IRA account owner to fix a leaky toilet. The IRS specifically states that custodians may impose their own policies above the rules imposed by the IRS. Neither custodians nor administrators can provide advice.

Many IRA custodians limit available investments to traditional brokerage accounts such as stocks, bonds, and mutual funds. Investments in an asset class such as real estate would only be permitted in an IRA if the real estate is held indirectly via a security such as a publicly traded or non-traded real estate investment trust (REIT). Self-directed IRA custodians/administrators can allow real estate and other non-traditional assets held in forms other than a REIT, such as a piece of rental property, raw land, or fishing rights.

Publicly traded securities such as options, futures or other derivatives are allowed in IRAs, but certain custodians or brokers may restrict their use. For example, some options brokers allow their IRA accounts to hold stock options, but others do not. Using certain derivatives or investments that involve leverage may be allowed by the IRC, it may also cause the IRA to pay taxes under the rules of Unrelated Business Income Tax (UBIT). Self-directed IRAs which hold alternative investments such as real estate, horses, or intellectual property, can involve more complexity than IRAs which only hold stocks or mutual funds.

An IRA may borrow or loan money but any such loan must not be personally guaranteed by the owner of the IRA. Any loan on assets in the IRA would be required to be a non-recourse loan. The loan could not be personally secured by the IRA account owner, or the IRA itself. It can only be secured by the asset in question. The owner of the IRA may not pledge the IRA as security against an outside debt.

== Distribution of funds ==
Although funds can be distributed from an IRA at any time, there are limited circumstances when money can be distributed or withdrawn from the account without penalties. Unless an exception applies, money can typically be withdrawn penalty-free as taxable income from an IRA once the owner reaches age 59 years and 6 months. Also, non-Roth owners must begin taking distributions of at least the calculated minimum amounts by April 1 of the year after reaching age 72. If the required minimum distribution (RMD) is not taken the penalty is 50% of the amount that should have been taken. The amount that must be taken is calculated based on a factor taken from the appropriate IRS table and is based on the life expectancy of the owner and possibly his or her spouse as beneficiary if applicable. Withdrawals are taxable unless paid to a charity after age 72; this cutoff has changed over time. Payments to charities are called Qualified Charitable Distributions (QCD). At the death of the owner, distributions must continue and if there is a designated beneficiary, distributions can be based on the life expectancy of the beneficiary.

There are several exceptions to the rule that penalties apply to distributions before age 59 1/2. Each exception has detailed rules that must be followed to be exempt from penalties. This group of penalty exemptions are popularly known as hardship withdrawals. The exceptions include:

- The portion of unreimbursed medical expenses that are more than 7.5% of adjusted gross income
- Distributions that are not more than the cost of medical insurance while unemployed
- Disability (defined as not being able to engage in any substantial gainful activity)
- Amounts distributed to beneficiaries of a deceased IRA owner
- Distributions in the form of an annuity (see substantially equal periodic payments)
- Distributions that are not more than the qualified higher education expenses of the owner or their children or grandchildren
- Distributions to buy, build, or rebuild a first home ($10,000 lifetime maximum)
- Distribution due to an IRS levy of the plan

There are a number of other important details that govern different situations. For Roth IRAs with only contributed funds the basis can be withdrawn before age 59 without penalty (or tax) on a first in first out basis, and a penalty would apply only on any growth (the taxable amount) that was taken out before 59 where an exception didn't apply. Amounts converted from a traditional to a Roth IRA must stay in the account for a minimum of 5 years to avoid having a penalty on withdrawal of basis unless one of the above exceptions applies.

If the contribution to the IRA was nondeductible or the IRA owner chose not to claim a deduction for the contribution, distributions of those nondeductible amounts are tax and penalty free.

== Bankruptcy status ==
In the case of Rousey v. Jacoway, the United States Supreme Court ruled unanimously on April 4, 2005, that under section 522(d)(10)(E) of the United States Bankruptcy Code (11 U.S.C. § 522(d)(10)(E)), a debtor in bankruptcy can exempt his or her IRA, up to the amount necessary for retirement, from the bankruptcy estate. The Court indicated that because rights to withdrawals are based on age, IRAs should receive the same protection as other retirement plans. Thirty-four states already had laws effectively allowing an individual to exempt an IRA in bankruptcy, but the Supreme Court decision allows federal protection for IRAs.

The Bankruptcy Abuse Prevention and Consumer Protection Act of 2005 expanded the protection for IRAs. Certain IRAs (rollovers from SEP or Simple IRAs, Roth IRAs, individual IRAs) are exempt up to at least $1,000,000 (adjusted periodically for inflation) without having to show necessity for retirement. The law provides that "such amount may be increased if the interests of justice so require." Other IRAs (rollovers from most employer sponsored retirement plans (401(k)s, etc.) and non-rollover SEP and SIMPLE IRAs) are entirely exempt.

The 2005 BAPCPA also increased the Federal Deposit Insurance Corporation insurance limit for IRA deposits at banks.

The United States Court of Appeals for the Eleventh Circuit has ruled that if an IRA engages in a "prohibited transaction" under Internal Revenue Code sections 408(e)(2) and 4975(c)(1), the assets in the IRA will no longer qualify for bankruptcy protection.

With respect to inherited IRAs, the United States Supreme Court ruled, in the case of Clark v. Rameker in June 2014, that funds in an inherited IRA do not qualify as "retirement funds" within the meaning of the federal bankruptcy exemption statute, 11 U.S.C. section 522(b)(3)(C).

== Protection from creditors ==
There are several options of protecting an IRA: (1) roll it over into a qualified plan like a 401(k), (2) take a distribution, pay the tax and protect the proceeds along with the other liquid assets, or (3) rely on the state law exemption for IRAs. For example, the California exemption statute provides that IRAs and self-employed plans' assets "are exempt only to the extent necessary to provide for the support of the judgment debtor when the judgment debtor retires and for the support of the spouse and dependents of the judgment debtor, taking into account all resources that are likely to be available for the support of the judgment debtor when the judgment debtor retires". What is reasonably necessary is determined on a case-by-case basis, and the courts will take into account other funds and income streams available to the beneficiary of the plan. Debtors who are skilled, well-educated, and have time left until retirement are usually afforded little protection under the California statute as the courts presume that such debtors will be able to provide for retirement.

Many states have laws that prohibit judgments from lawsuits to be satisfied by seizure of IRA assets. For example, IRAs are protected up to $500,000 in Nevada from Writs of Execution. However, this type of protection does not usually exist in the case of divorce, failure to pay taxes, deeds of trust, and fraud.

In accordance with the Bankruptcy Abuse Prevention and Consumer Protection Act of 2005, IRAs are protected from creditors during bankruptcy up to $1,000,000 (the act requires the IRS to adjust this limit for inflation every three years; the most recent adjustment was $1,362,800 in 2019). An exception is that inherited IRAs do not qualify for an exemption from the bankruptcy estate and thus federal law does not protect them from creditors in bankruptcy. Some state laws, however, may protect inherited IRAs from creditors in bankruptcy.

== Borrowing ==
An IRA owner may not borrow money from the IRA except for a 60-day period in a calendar year. Any borrowing in excess of 60 days in a calendar year disqualifies the IRA from special tax treatment. An IRA may incur debt or borrow money secured by its assets, but the IRA owner may not guarantee or secure the loan personally. An example of this is a real estate purchase within a self-directed IRA along with a non-recourse mortgage.

Income from debt-financed property in an IRA may generate unrelated business taxable income in the IRA.

The rules regarding IRA rollovers and transfers allow the IRA owner to perform an "indirect rollover" to another IRA. An indirect rollover can be used to temporarily "borrow" money from the IRA, once in a twelve-month period. The money must be placed in an IRA arrangement within 60 days, or the transaction will be deemed an early withdrawal (subject to the appropriate withdrawal taxes and penalties) and may not be replaced.

== Double taxation ==
Double taxation still occurs within these tax-sheltered investment arrangements. For example, foreign dividends may be taxed at their point of origin, and the IRS does not recognize this tax as a creditable deduction. There is some controversy over whether this violates tax treaties, such as the Convention Between Canada and the United States of America With Respect to Taxes on Income and on Capital.

== Inheriting ==
If the IRA owner dies, different rules are applied depending on who inherits the IRA (spouse or other eligible designated beneficiary, other beneficiary, multiple beneficiaries, and so on).

In case of spouse inherited IRAs, the owner's spouse has the following options:

- treat the IRA account as his or her own, which means that he or she can name a beneficiary for the assets, continue to contribute to the IRA and avoid having to take distributions. This avoids paying the extra 10% tax on early distributions from an IRA.
- rollover the IRA funds into another plan and take distributions as a beneficiary. Distributions will be determined by the required minimum distribution rules based on the surviving spouse's life expectancy.
- disclaim up to 100% of the IRA assets, which, besides avoiding extra taxable income, enables their children to inherit the IRA assets
- take all of the IRA assets out in one lump-sum, which can subject the spouse to federal taxes if particular requirements are not met

In case of non-spouse inherited IRAs, the beneficiary cannot choose to treat the IRA as his or her own, but the following options are available:

- take out all of the assets within 10 years of the owner's death (10-year rule); withdrawals may be subject to federal taxes.
- disclaim all or part of the assets in the IRA for up to 9 months after the IRA owner's death.
- if the beneficiary is older than the IRA owner, he or she can take distributions from the account based on the IRA owner's age.
- Minor children of the decedent may take distributions based on their own life expectancy until they turn 21. After age 21, this changes to the 10-year rule, with all assets required to be distributed no later than the 10th year after the beneficiary turns 21.
- Beneficiaries who are chronically ill or permanently disabled, regardless of age, may take distributions based on their own life expectancy.
- The life expectancy schedule is also available to beneficiaries who are no more than 10 years younger than the decedent.

In case of multiple beneficiaries the distribution amounts are based on the oldest beneficiary's age. Alternatively, multiple beneficiaries can split the inherited IRA into separate accounts, in which case the RMD rules will apply separately to each separate account.

== Statistics ==
Detailed statistics on IRAs have been collected by the Employee Benefit Research Institute, in its EBRI IRA Database (Center for Research on IRAs), and various analyses performed. An overview is given in (Copeland 2010). Some highlights from the 2008 data follow:

- The average and median IRA account balance was $54,863 and $15,756, respectively, while the average and median IRA individual balance (all accounts from the same person combined) was $69,498 and $20,046. The average is significantly higher than the median (over three times higher), reflecting significant positive skew – very large balances increase the average.
  - Average and median balances increased with age, reaching a maximum in the 65–69 age group, before leveling off for 70 and over.
- Rollovers overwhelm contributions – the overwhelming majority of IRA contributions, in dollar terms, were from rollovers, rather than new contributions – over 10 times as much is added to IRAs from rollovers than new contributions.
  - While many rollovers were small (28.5% were less than $5,000, and 53.1% were less than $25,000), a significant number of rollovers were quite large, with 20.2% being more than $100,000.
- IRAs were divided by type as 33.6% traditional IRAs, 33.4% rollover IRAs (combined with the traditional IRAs, 67 percent), 23.4% Roth IRAs, and 9.6% SEPs and SIMPLEs.
- Excluding SEPs and SIMPLEs (i.e., concerning traditional, rollover, and Roth IRAs), 15.1% of individuals holding an IRA contributed to one. The percentage was much higher for Roth IRAs: 7.2% of owners of traditional or rollover IRAs (same for contribution purposes) contributed, while 29.5% of owners of Roth IRAs contributed.
- Contributions are concentrated at the maximum amount – of those contributing to an IRA, approximately 40% contributed the maximum (whether contributing to traditional or Roth), and 46.7% contributed close to the maximum (in the $5,000–$6,000 range).

The Government Accountability Office (GAO) issued a report on IRAs in November 2014. This report gives the GAO's estimate on the number of taxpayers with IRAs as well as the estimated account balances. Here are some highlights from the report:

- For tax year 2011 (the most recent year available), an estimated 43 million taxpayers had individual retirement accounts (IRAs) with a total reported fair market value (FMV) of $5.2 trillion.
- Few taxpayers had aggregated balances exceeding $5 million as of 2011. Generally, taxpayers with IRA balances greater than $5 million tend to have adjusted gross incomes greater than $200,000, be joint filers, and are age 65 or older.
- In 2014, the federal government will forgo an estimated $17.45 billion in tax revenue from IRAs, which Congress created to ensure equitable tax treatment for those not covered by employer-sponsored retirement plans.
- 98.5% of taxpayers have IRA account balances at $1,000,000 or less.
- 1.2% of tax payers have IRA account balances at $1,000,000 to $2,000,000.
- 0.2% (or 83,529) taxpayers have IRA account balances of $2,000,000 to $3,000,000
- 0.1% (or 36,171) taxpayers have IRA account balances of $3,000,000 to $5,000,000
- <0.1% (or 7,952) taxpayers have IRA account balances of $5,000,000 to $10,000,000
- <0.1% (or 791) taxpayers have IRA account balances of $10,000,000 to $25,000,000
- <0.1% (or 314) taxpayers have IRA account balances of $25,000,000 or more

=== Retirement savings ===
While the average (mean) and median IRA individual balance in 2008 were approximately $70,000 and $20,000 respectively, higher balances are not rare. 6.3% of individuals had total balances of $250,000 or more (about 12.5 times the median), and in rare cases, individuals own IRAs with very substantial balances, in some cases $100 million or above (about 5,000 times the median individual balance). This can occur when IRA owners invest in shares of private companies, and the share value subsequently rises substantially.

In November 2014, the Government Accountability Office (GAO) released a report that stated there were an estimated 314 taxpayers with IRA account balances of greater than $25,000,000. Also that there are an estimate of 791 taxpayers with IRA account balances between $10,000,000 and $25,000,000. The purpose of this report was to study individual retirement accounts (IRAs) and the account valuations. There were concerns raised about whether the tax incentives encourage new or additional saving. Congress is reexamining retirement tax incentives as part of tax reform. GAO was asked to measure IRA balances and assess IRS enforcement of IRA laws.

The Joint Committee on Taxation reported that as of the end of 2019, there were 28,615 taxpayers with traditional and Roth IRA assets in excess of $5 million and an aggregate value totaling almost $280 billion. An investigative report in 2021 highlighted Peter Thiel, who built a Roth IRA worth $5 billion by investing in startups on terms unavailable to most taxpayers. The owners of such high-value IRAs constituted less than one tenth of a percent of the more than 65 million IRA owners at the end of 2018, and policy proposals have been advanced to limit such accumulation.

According to a 2015 study done by the National Institute on Retirement Security, titled "The Continuing Retirement Savings Crisis", 45% of working Americans do not own any retirement account assets, whether in an employer-based 401(k) type plan or an IRA. Furthermore, the typical working household has virtually no retirement savings - the median retirement account balance is $2,500 for all working-age households and $14,500 for near-retirement households. In 2020, half of American adults had less than $6,500 in the combination of their IRAs and defined contribution plans, such as 401(k).

While inflation-adjusted stock market values generally rose from 1978 to 1997, in March 2013, they were lower than during the period 1998 through 2007. This has caused IRAs to perform substantially more poorly than expected when current retirees were investing the bulk of their savings in them. In 2010, Duncan Black wrote in an opinion column in USA Today that the median household retirement account balance for workers aged 55 to 64 was $120,000, which "will provide only a trivial supplement to Social Security", but a third of households had no retirement savings at all.

== Similar policies in other countries ==
- Registered retirement savings plan (RRSP) and tax-free savings account (TFSA) (Canada)
- Superannuation in Australia (Australia) – Australia and New Zealand have a reciprocal agreement allowing Australians moving to New Zealand to transfer their Australian superannuation scheme to an approved KiwiSaver funds, and vice versa.
- KiwiSaver (New Zealand) – Australia and New Zealand have a reciprocal agreement allowing New Zealanders moving to Australia to transfer their KiwiSaver funds to an approved Australian superannuation scheme, and vice versa.
- Mandatory Provident Fund (Hong Kong)
- Vanuatu National Provident Fund (Vanuatu) - a compulsory savings scheme for employees who receive a salary of Vt3, 000 or more a month, to help them financially at retirement.
- Central Provident Fund (Singapore)
- Employees Provident Fund (Malaysia)
- Pensions in Chile
- Individual savings account (ISA) (United Kingdom)
- Personal Retirement Savings Account (PRSA) (Ireland)
- Nippon individual savings account (NISA) (Japan)

== See also ==
- 401(k)
- Comparison of 401(k) and IRA accounts
- Gold IRA
- MyRA
- Retirement plans in the United States
- Rollovers as business start-ups
- Roth 401(k)
- Solo 401(k)
