= Comparison of 401(k) and IRA accounts =

Comparison of US retirement options

This is a comparison between 401(k), Roth 401(k), and Traditional Individual Retirement Account and Roth Individual Retirement Account accounts, four different types of retirement savings vehicles that are common in the United States.

== Comparison ==
Tax Year 2026	(Traditional) 401(k)	Roth 401(k)	Traditional IRA	Roth IRA
Tax benefit	Capital gains, dividends, and interest within account incur no tax liability.			
Subjected taxes	Contributions are usually pre-tax; but can also be post-tax, if allowed by plan. Distributions are taxed as ordinary income (except any post-tax principal).	Contributions are post-tax. Qualified distributions are not taxable.	Contributions are deductible (subject to conditions). When deducted, contributions are pre-tax, otherwise, they are post-tax. Distributions are taxed as ordinary income (except any non-deducted principal).	Contributions are post-tax. Qualified distributions are not taxable.
Employer or Individual	Employer or sole proprietor sets up this plan.		Individual sets up this plan.	
Contribution Limits	Employee contribution limit of $24,500/yr for under 50; $32,000/yr for age 50 or above in 2026; limits are a total of pre-tax Traditional 401(k) and Roth 401(k) contributions. Total employee (including after-tax Traditional 401(k)) and employer combined contributions must be lesser of 100% of employee's salary or $70,000 ($77,500 for age 50 or above). There is no income cap for this investment class.		$7,500/yr for age 49 or below; $8,600/yr for age 50 or above in 2026; limits are total for traditional IRA and Roth IRA contributions combined. Cannot contribute more than annual earned income. For direct contributions to Roth IRAs, contribution limit is reduced in a "phase-out" range, for single MAGI > $149,000 and joint MAGI > $246,000 (For this purpose, however, MAGI excludes any Roth conversions.) Contribution limit does not apply to conversions from traditional IRA (or qualified employer plans) to Roth IRA.	
Contribution notes		Effective limit is higher than traditional 401(k) as the contributions are post-tax.		Effective limit is higher than traditional IRA as the contributions are post-tax.
Matching Contributions	Matching contributions available from some employers.	Matching contributions available through some employers, but they must sit in a pretax account.	No matching contributions available.	
Deduction Limits	Generally no limit on the amount deductible from income, but somewhat complicated due to HCE (highly compensated employees) rules.		Full deduction available on incomes up to $198,000, depending on tax filing status. See full rules.	Tax-exempt earnings on contributions available up to incomes of $208,000, depending on tax filing status. See full rules and Backdoor Roth IRA Contributions.
	(Traditional) 401(k)	Roth 401(k)	Traditional IRA	Roth IRA
Distributions	Distributions can begin at age 59½ or if owner becomes disabled.	Distributions can begin at age 59½ and the account has been open for at least 5 years, or if owner becomes disabled, with some exceptions.	Distributions can begin at age 59½ or if owner becomes disabled.	Distributions can begin at age 59½ as long as contributions are "seasoned" (5 years from January 1 of the year the first contribution was made) or owner becomes disabled.
Forced Distributions	Must start withdrawing funds at age 72 unless employee is still employed with employer setting up the 401(k), and not a 5% owner. Penalty is 50% of minimum distribution.		Must start withdrawing funds at age 72. Penalty is 50% of minimum distribution.	None.
Loans	When still employed with employer setting up the 401(k), loans may be available depending upon the plan, not more than 50% of balance or $50,000.		No	
Early Withdrawal	Generally no when still employed with employer setting up the 401(k). Otherwise, 10% penalty plus taxes. There are some exceptions to this penalty.	Generally no when still employed with employer setting up the 401(k). Otherwise, taxes on the earnings, plus 10% penalty on taxable part of distribution and taxable part of unseasoned conversions. There are some exceptions to this penalty.	10% penalty plus taxes for distributions before age 59½ with exceptions.	Principal of contributions and seasoned conversions can be withdrawn at any time without tax or penalty. Additional amounts are subject to normal income taxes and 10% penalty if not qualified distributions.
Home Down Payment	Purchase of primary residence and avoidance of foreclosure or eviction of primary residence, subject to 10% penalty, if hardship withdrawals are available in the plan.	If one's plan permits distributions from accounts because of hardship, they may choose to receive a hardship distribution from their designated Roth account. The hardship distribution will consist of a pro-rata share of earnings and basis and the earnings portion will be included in gross income unless they have had the designated Roth account for 5 years and are either disabled or over age 59 ½.	Can withdraw up to $10,000 for a first time home purchase down payment with stipulations.	Up to $10,000 can be used for primary home down payment. Must have held Roth IRA for a minimum of 5 years. Must not have owned a home in previous 24 months. House must be owned by IRA owner or direct linear ancestors or descendants.
Education Expenses	Payment of secondary educational expenses in last 12 months for employee, spouse, or dependents, subject to 10% penalty, if hardship withdrawals are available in the plan.	If one's plan permits distributions from accounts because of hardship, they may choose to receive a hardship distribution from their designated Roth account. The hardship distribution will consist of a pro-rata share of earnings and basis and the earnings portion will be included in gross income unless they have had the designated Roth account for 5 years and are either disabled or over age 59 ½.	Can withdraw for qualified higher education expenses of owner, children, and grandchildren.	
Medical Expenses	Medical expenses not covered by insurance for employee, spouse, or dependents, subject to 10% penalty, if hardship withdrawals are available in the plan. Medical expenses in excess of 7.5% of one's adjusted gross income may be exempt to the 10% penalty.	If one's plan permits distributions from accounts because of hardship, they may choose to receive a hardship distribution from their designated Roth account. The hardship distribution will consist of a pro-rata share of earnings and basis and the earnings portion will be included in gross income unless they have had the designated Roth account for 5 years and are either disabled or over age 59 ½.	Can withdraw for qualified unreimbursed medical expenses that are more than 7.5% of AGI; medical insurance during period of unemployment; during disability.	
	(Traditional) 401(k)	Roth 401(k)	Traditional IRA	Roth IRA
Conversions and Rollovers	Upon termination of employment (or in some plans, even while in service), can be rolled to IRA or Roth IRA. When rolled to a Roth IRA, taxes need to be paid during the year of the conversion.	Cannot be converted to a traditional 401(k), but upon termination of employment (or in some plans, even while in service), can be rolled into Roth IRA.	Can be converted to a Roth IRA, typically for backdoor Roth IRA contributions. Taxes need to be paid during the year of the conversion. Also, the non-basis portion can be rolled over into a 401(k), if allowed by the 401(k) plan.	
Changing Institutions	Can roll over to another employer's 401(k) plan or to a rollover IRA at an independent institution.	Can roll over to another employer's Roth 401(k) plan or to a Roth IRA at an independent institution.	Funds can be either transferred to another institution or they can be sent to the owner of the traditional IRA who has 60 days to put the money in another institution in a rollover contribution to another traditional IRA.	
Beneficiaries	For married persons, federal law dictates that the beneficiary of any form of 401(k) automatically be the surviving spouse. A different party may be named beneficiary, however, provided the surviving-spouse-to-be has consented and the consent is in written form. For single persons, any party may be named beneficiary; however, if no beneficiary is named, then it defaults to the decedent's estate.		When owner dies, spouse as beneficiary can roll both accounts into one IRA account. Other beneficiaries will be subject to forced distributions (taxable) over a ten-year period. Beneficiaries will not pay estate tax if the inheritance is under the exemption amount.	
Protection	Account is protected from bankruptcy and creditors (with limited exceptions, e.g. IRS).		Account is protected from bankruptcy up to $1,362,800. Protection from creditors varies by state (from none to full protection).	
	(Traditional) 401(k)	Roth 401(k)	Traditional IRA	Roth IRA

== See also ==
- Retirement plans in the United States
- Individual retirement account
