= SIMPLE IRA =

Type of retirement plan in United States

A Savings Incentive Match Plan for Employees Individual Retirement Account, commonly known by the abbreviation "SIMPLE IRA", is a type of tax-deferred employer-provided retirement plan in the United States that allows employees to set aside money and invest it to grow for retirement. Specifically, it is a type of Individual Retirement Account (IRA) that is set up as an employer-provided plan. It is an employer sponsored plan, like better-known plans such as the 401(k) and 403(b) (Tax Sheltered Annuity plans), but offers simpler and less costly administration rules, as it is still subject to ERISA and its associated regulations. Like a 401(k) plan, the SIMPLE IRA can be funded with pre-tax salary contributions, but those contributions are still subject to Social Security, Medicare, and Federal Unemployment Tax Act taxes. Contribution limits for SIMPLE plans are lower than for most other types of employer-provided retirement plans as compared to conventional defined contribution plans like Section 402(g), 401(k), 401(a), and 403(b) plans.

== Rules ==
- Only an "eligible employer" may establish a SIMPLE IRA. An eligible employer is one with no more than 100 employees. An employer who has already established a SIMPLE IRA may continue to be "eligible" for two years after crossing the 100-employee limit.
- Employees are not required to make regular IRA contributions to their SIMPLE IRA account.
- A SIMPLE IRA requires a certain minimum contribution from the employer. The employer may either:
  - Match the contributions of each employee dollar-for-dollar up to 3% of the employee's compensation (or a smaller percentage in certain cases); or
  - Contribute a flat 2% of the compensation for each employee with at least $5,000 in compensation for the year, regardless of the amount the employee contributes.
- Employees who are not yet age 50 are allowed to contribute up to $14,000 in 2022. Participants who are age 50 or older are allowed to contribute $17,000 for 2022. These limits are different from the limits that apply to 401(k), 403(b), and 457 plans.
- The SIMPLE plan can technically be funded with either an IRA or a 401(k). There is almost no benefit to funding it with a 401(k), because the lower contribution limits of the SIMPLE are required as is the expensive extra administration of the 401(k).
- An employee is allowed to make a direct rollover from a SIMPLE IRA into a Traditional IRA after at least two years have passed from the date the employee first participated in the plan.
- An employee is allowed to make a direct rollover from an IRA, a 401(k), or a 403(b) into a SIMPLE IRA after two years of participation. An employee is allowed to make a direct rollover from another SIMPLE plan into a SIMPLE IRA during the first two years of participation in a SIMPLE IRA.

If a participant, who is not yet 59½ years old, wishes to take a distribution and it has been less than two years since their first contribution into the plan, they could be required to pay a penalty of up to 25% (10% if more than two years) to the Internal Revenue Service. This two-year rule applies to all distributions, including rollovers from the SIMPLE IRA. Any amount withdrawn and not rolled over, regardless of age, is also subject to ordinary income tax for the year in which the distribution is made.

== Annual contribution limits ==
Contribution Limits
Year	Under Age 50	Age 50 or Older
2005	$10,000	$12,000
2006	$10,000	$12,500
2007	$10,500	$13,000
2008	$10,500	$13,000
2009	$11,500	$14,000
2010	$11,500	$14,000
2011	$11,500	$14,000
2012	$11,500	$14,000
2013	$12,000	$14,500
2014	$12,000	$14,500
2015	$12,500	$15,500
2016	$12,500	$15,500
2017	$12,500	$15,500
2018	$12,500	$15,500
2019	$13,000	$16,000
2020	$13,500	$16,500
2021	$13,500	$16,500
2022	$14,000	$17,000
2023	$15,500	$19,000
2024	$16,000	$19,500

== See also ==
- Form 1099-R
- List of finance topics
- Personal finance
