= Substantially equal periodic payments =

Substantially equal periodic payments (SEPP) are one of the exceptions in the United States Internal Revenue Code that allows a retiree to receive payments before age 59 1/2 from a retirement plan or deferred annuity without the 10% early distribution penalty under certain circumstances.

== Rules ==
The rules for SEPPs are set out in Code section 72(t) (for retirement plans) and section 72(q) (for annuities), and allow for three methods of calculating the allowed withdrawal amount:

- Required minimum distribution method, based on the life expectancy of the account owner (or the joint life of the owner and his/her beneficiary) using the IRS tables for required minimum distributions.
- Fixed amortization method over the life expectancy of the owner.
- Fixed annuity method using an annuity factor from a reasonable mortality table.

The interest rate that can be used in the latter two calculations can be any rate up to 5% per annum, or up to 120% of the Applicable Federal Mid Term rate (AFR) for either of the two months prior to the calculation. SEPP payments must continue for the longer of five years or until the account owner reaches 59 1/2. The payments cannot be changed beyond a one-time allowed change from one of the latter two calculation methods to the first or all of the payments received will be retroactively taxable and penalized.

If the retirement account owner withdraws more or less than the amount calculated under the SEPP formula, the 10% early distribution penalty that was waived would apply in all instances (where it was waived under the SEPP program), and interest on those amounts would also apply.
