= ABLE account =

U.S. savings program for individuals with disabilities

An ABLE account, also known as a 529 ABLE or 529A account, is a state-run savings program for eligible people with disabilities in the United States. Rules governing ABLE accounts are codified in Internal Revenue Code section 529A, which was enacted by the Achieving a Better Life Experience (ABLE) Act in 2014. With limitations, funds in an ABLE account are exempt from many public benefit programs (including Supplemental Security Income (SSI), public housing/Section 8, food stamps/SNAP, and Medicaid) asset limits, and earnings are exempt from federal income tax.

== History ==
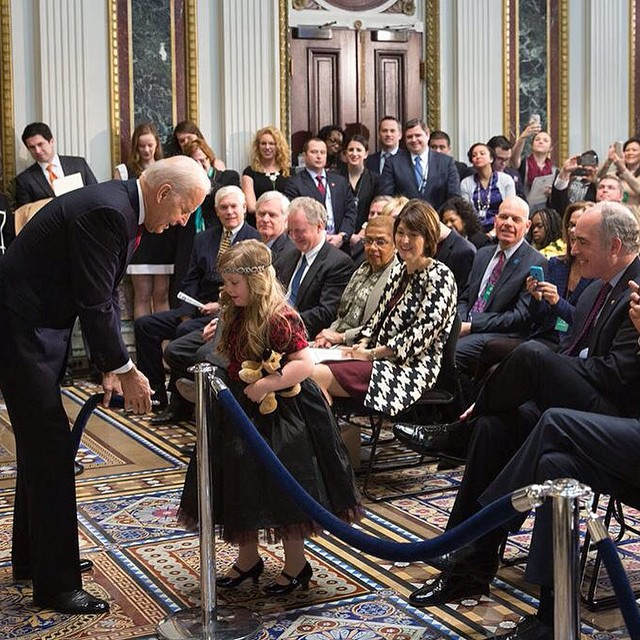
Vice President Joe Biden and a child with disabilities at an event at the White House about the ABLE program in 2015.

Stephen E. Beck, Jr., vice chairman of the National Down Syndrome Society and the Down Syndrome Association of Northern Virginia Board of Directors, proposed a plan to help his daughter, who has Down syndrome, save money. Beck's plan became the basis for the Achieving a Better Life Experience (ABLE) Act.

The ABLE Act received broad support in Congress, with 85% of Congress signing on as cosponsors. On December 19, 2014, the ABLE Act was signed into law by President Obama.

In June 2016, Ohio, Tennessee, and Nebraska were the first three states to launch ABLE programs.

The Tax Cuts and Jobs Act of 2017 included language from the ABLE Financial Planning Act and the ABLE to Work Act. The ABLE Financial Planning Act allows rollovers from 529 plans to ABLE accounts. The ABLE to Work Act allows working beneficiaries who don't contribute to 401(k) or similar plans to make additional contributions to ABLE accounts.

By August 2018, 39 states and the District of Columbia ran ABLE programs, some of which were open to individuals nationwide. As of 2026, all states except North Dakota, South Dakota, and Wisconsin offer their own state-sponsored ABLE accounts.

== Characteristics ==
ABLE programs are similar to tax-advantaged 529 plans for college savings. In addition, a 529 plan can be rolled over into an ABLE account for a qualified beneficiary.

Initially, ABLE accounts were only available to disabled individuals who became disabled before 26 years of age. Beginning in 2026, the accounts became available to disabled individuals who became disabled before age 46. An ABLE account can receive after-tax cash contributions from any person, including its owner. Contributions in a year are limited to the federal gift tax exclusion for that year — $19,000 in 2025. If the beneficiary works and does not contribute to a 401(a), 401(k), 403(b), or 457 plan, the beneficiary can contribute an additional amount above that limit. The additional amount is equal to the lesser of the beneficiary's annual compensation or the federal poverty level for an individual — $12,060 in 2018.

Up to $100,000 in an ABLE account is exempt from the Supplemental Security Income (SSI) asset limit. If an ABLE account larger than $100,000 stops eligibility for SSI, the owner remains eligible for Medicaid. An ABLE account can be used instead of, or together with, a supplemental needs trust, to maintain a beneficiary's eligibility for SSI.

Earnings from an ABLE account are exempt from federal income tax, and money spent from the account must be used for qualified expenses, such as education, housing, transportation, and job training. Some states make contributions to an ABLE account deductible from state income tax.

== Qualified disability expenses ==
Qualified Disability Expenses (QDEs) are costs related to the disability and are intended to maintain or improve the quality of life for individuals with disabilities. These expenses cover a broad range of disability-related needs and can be crucial for those with special requirements.

QDEs can be drawn from an ABLE account tax-free. These may include costs associated with:

1. Education
2. Housing
3. Transportation
4. Employment training and support
5. Assistive technology and related services
6. Personal support services
7. Health, prevention, and wellness
8. Financial management and administrative services
9. Legal fees
10. Oversight and monitoring
11. Funeral and burial expenses
12. Other expenses approved by the Secretary of the Treasury under regulations.
