= True Link =

American financial services company

True Link Financial, Inc.
- Type: Private
- Industry: Financial services
- Headquarters: San Francisco, California, U.S.
- Website: www.truelinkfinancial.com

True Link Financial, Inc., is a San Francisco, California based financial technology firm that offers investment accounts and prepaid cards customized for seniors, people with disabilities, and people recovering from addiction. Notable investors include Y Combinator, Khosla Ventures, QED Investors, Mitch Kapor, Alexis Ohanian, Eric Ries, Initialized Capital, Matt Cutts, and Centana Growth Partners.

== Services for seniors with memory loss ==
True Link offers a Visa card with special controls that prevent common types of fraud and financial abuse targeting the elderly. In addition to fraud-detection algorithms developed by the company, the card can be customized to restrict telemarketer purchases across the board, block certain charitable organizations and allow others, set limits on ATM usage and receive text messages, or selectively block only a few problematic merchants.

The company was inspired by CEO Kai Stinchcombe's experience with his grandmother Ruth, who gave tens of thousands of dollars to pushy telemarketers and charitable solicitors. According to survey research, fourteen percent of seniors are victimized by fraud every year, and an additional fifty-four percent are targeted. The company was formed in November 2012 by co-founders Kai Stinchcombe and Claire McDonnell and launched its product in August 2013. Financial institutions have expressed interest in partnering with the company to help protect their customers from fraud.

According to True Link's research, fraud targeting seniors is a $36.5 billion per year problem. True Link uses fraud detection algorithms and maintains a large database filled with scams and suspicious merchants, and members of True Link's data science team are frequently cited as experts on scams and fraud targeting the elderly.

== Services for people with disabilities or special needs ==
The company also provides services to people with disabilities, including by working with ABLE accounts, special needs trusts, pooled trusts and representative payees. Its cards are used by the ABLE programs of twelve states and are mentioned in the Social Security Administration operations manual in the context of disbursements from special needs trusts.

In its investment strategies, the company sometimes uses bond ladders which reduce interest rate risk, and a time-based investment strategy described by experts as a "strategy for a lifetime of income." The investment allocations are based on Modern portfolio theory and include company shares and bonds as well as an annuity component in some cases.

== Services for people recovering from addiction ==
The company provides its cards to people recovering from addiction to help manage cash and prevent relapse. The company's research states that 8 in ten people agree that regaining control of one's finances is among the biggest obstacles in recovering from a substance use disorder, and 77% of adults with a loved one who has a substance abuse disorder felt that their loved one having access to cash could result in relapse.

In August 2016 True Link acquired Next Step Network, LLC., a company that offers payment cards to people recovering from addiction. Around 2.5 million people receive care at an addiction treatment facility every year.
