= Ascensus =

American financial services company

Ascensus, LLC.
- Type: Private
- Industry: Financial services
- Founded: 1980; 46 years ago
- Headquarters: Dresher, Pennsylvania, United States
- Key people: Nick Good (CEO); David Musto (Executive Chairman)
- Products: Retirement plans; 529 plans; individual retirement accounts
- Number of employees: 5,500 (2023)
- Website: www.ascensus.com

Ascensus, LLC. is an American financial services company that provides financial recordkeeping, tax-advantaged savings and retirement plan services. As of 2026, Ascensus reports that it has more than 16 million account holders and more than $913 billion in assets under administration. Ascensus primarily partners with financial institutions and government agencies to provide services to their employees and clients.

== History and ownership ==
Ascensus was founded in 1980 as the Barclay Group Inc; the head office is in Dresher, Pennsylvania. In 1993 it was sold to BISYS Group, which was in 2007 purchased by Citigroup who spun off the retirement arm to J.C. Flowers & Co.

In 2015, Ascensus was offered for sale by JC Flowers. In the fourth quarter of 2015, the company was acquired by Genstar Capital and Aquiline Capital Partners. As of 2017, the company was listed as a NAFCU (National Association of Federally-Insured Credit Unions) Preferred Partner.

In 2020, Ascensus was planning for a potential 2021 IPO, but instead a majority stake was sold in 2021 by Genstar Capital, Aquiline Capital Partners, and Atlas Merchant Capital to Stone Point Capital LLC and GIC. Genstar Capital and Aquiline retained a minority stake.

In April 2022, Ascensus acquired Newport Group, a provider of nonqualified retirement plans and record-keeping services. In 2024, Ascensus announced their acquisition of Mutual of Omaha's 401(k) recordkeeping business after having provided outsourced retirement services to the firm for over two decades. That year, Ascensus also sold their employee stock ownership plan business to Principal Financial Group.

In January 2026, Ascensus announced that it had surpassed $300 billion in total 529 plan assets under administration, serving more than 8.5 million accounts. In August, the company finalized its acquisition of AmericanTCS, a provider of retirement, trust and custody, and technology automation solutions.

== Lines of business ==
=== Retirement savings ===
Ascensus provides recordkeeping and administration services for qualified and nonqualified retirement plans, including 401(k), 403(b), Multiple Employer Plans (MEPs), Pooled Employer Plans (PEPs), Simplified Employee Pension Plans (SEP), Savings Incentive Match Plans for Employees (SIMPLE) and IRA plans. Ascensus also provides 3(16) and 3(38) fiduciary services, as well ERISA support services.

Ascensus was chosen to manage Illinois’ retirement savings program, Secure Choice, in July 2017. Secure Choice was launched in phases in 2018 and 2019. The program is expected to cover 1.2 million workers.

In August 2018, it was announced that Ascensus would administer California's retirement savings program, CalSavers. In July 2019, California began offering 7 million workers the opportunity to contribute to an IRA through CalSavers.

In 2024, Ascensus acquired The Vanguard Group Individual 401(k), Multi-SEP, and SIMPLE IRA Plans. The company also acquired 401(k) Recordkeeping Business from Mutual of Omaha.

As of 2024, Ascensus administers over $1 Billion in State-facilitated retirement programs.

=== Government savings ===
Ascensus partners with government agencies to provide savings plans for education (529 plans), State-Facilitated Retirement Plans (SFRP), and those living with a disability (ABLE accounts).

In 2013, Ascensus acquired Upromise Investments, Sallie Mae's 529 college savings plan administrator. This resulted in the formation of its government savings division. The company also manages Ugift, its third-party giving program allowing family and friends to transfer money into 529 plans.

In 2015, Ascensus Government Savings was selected to manage the Rhode Island state 529 plan, CollegeBoundfund, in partnership with Invesco. In 2016, Ascensus College Savings partnered with Wealthfront, an automated investment service, to provide the state of Nevada with a 529 savings plan. This marks the first plan of this type to use an automated investment service.

Ascensus administers the ReadySave 529 app, which is used by State governments to enable families to manage their 529 education savings accounts.

=== Savings for individuals with disabilities ===
In February 2017, Illinois announced a 14-state partnership program, the National Achieving a Better Life Experience (ABLE) Alliance, the nation's largest multi-state agreement, that encourages residents to make investments to help disabled or blind citizens save for the future. Ascensus administers the program through its Government Savings division.

=== FuturePlan by Ascensus ===
Under the brandname "FuturePlan by Ascensus", Ascensus provides plan design, strategic consulting, IRS and Department of Labor (DOL) regulatory compliance services, and end-to-end plan administration for defined contribution plans. FuturePlan also offers defined benefit, cash balance, as well as prevailing wage benefits.
