= SNT =

SNT may refer to:

- Ant & Dec's Saturday Night Takeaway
- Allotment (gardening) (Russian: Садоводческие, огороднические некоммерческие товарищества, СНТ)
- Postal code for Sannat, Gozo, Malta
- Sistema Nacional de Televisión (Paraguay), television network
- Special needs trust or supplemental needs trust
