= SECURE 2.0 Act =

2022 US law related to retirement

Setting Every Community Up for Retirement Enhancement 2.0 Act of 2022
- Acronyms (colloquial): SECURE 2.0 Act
- Nicknames: SECURE 2.0 Act

Citations
- Public law: Pub. L. 117–328 (text) (PDF), Division T

Codification
- Acts affected: Internal Revenue Code of 1986; Employee Retirement Income Security Act of 1974
- Agencies affected: Internal Revenue Service; United States Department of Labor; United States Department of the Treasury

Legislative history
- Introduced in the House of Representatives; Signed into law by President Joe Biden on December 29, 2022

The SECURE 2.0 Act of 2022, was signed into law by President Joe Biden on December 29, 2022 as Division T of the Consolidated Appropriations Act, 2023. It builds on the changes made by the SECURE Act of 2019. SECURE stands for Setting Every Community Up for Retirement Enhancement.

== Legislative history ==
Richard Neal, the U.S. representative for Massachusetts's 1st congressional district and chairman of the House Ways and Means Committee, introduced the SECURE 2.0 Act as H.R.2954 on May 4, 2021. It passed the House Ways and Means Committee on May 5, 2021, and passed the full House on March 29, 2022.

On December 20, 2022, “Division T - Secure 2.0 Act of 2022” was added to H.R. 2617 (Consolidated Appropriations Act, 2023), incorporating H.R. 2954 into the omnibus bill. The omnibus bill, including Division T, passed the Senate On December 22nd, passed the House on December 23rd, and signed into law by President Joe Biden on December 29, 2022.

== Provisions ==
The SECURE 2.0 Act was drafted to assist in saving and investing for retirement. To that end, it contains a number of provisions to incentivize retirement planning, diversify the options available to savers, and increase access to tax-advantaged savings programs. Several of these provisions do not take effect until later years. Some of the provisions are:

- Expands automatic enrollment for certain retirement plans
- Creates a "saver's match", a federal tax credit which can be claimed by a taxpayer for contributing to an employer retirement plan.
- Increases age at which required minimum distributions start.
  - If a plan participant turns 73 in 2024 or later, required minimum distributions must begin at age 73.
  - If a plan participant turns 73 before 2024, required minimum distributions must begin at age 72.
- Catch-up contributions limits are now indexed to inflation.
- Allows additional catch-up contributions for participants aged 60 to 63.
- Allows employers to provide incentives, such as like payments or gift cards, to employees to join a retirement plan.
- Changes coverage requirements for part-time employees.
- Allows tax-free rollovers of 529 plans to Roth IRAs under certain circumstances.
- Creates several exemptions for early withdrawals, including:
  - Withdrawals for emergency personal expenses; (Note: For these purposes, an emergency personal expense meets an unforeseeable or immediate financial need relating to necessary personal or family emergency expenses. A limit of one such distribution per calendar year is allowed to be treated as an emergency personal expense distribution by an individual. An emergency personal expense distribution is limited to $1,000 per calendar year. Subsequent emergency personal expense distributions are limited.)
  - Withdrawals by domestic abuse victims; (Note: For these purposes, domestic abuse is defined as physical, psychological, sexual, emotional, or economic abuse. It may include efforts to control, isolate, humiliate, or intimidate the victim. It may also include efforts to undermine the victim's ability to reason independently, such as means of abuse of the victim's child or another family member living in the household. An individual is allowed to self-certify that they are a victim of domestic abuse in order to qualify for a withdrawal. A withdrawal by a domestic abuse victim is limited to the lesser of 50 percent of the account's balance or $10,000, indexed for inflation. A domestic abuse victim may opt to repay the withdrawal to the same account or a similar account over a three-year period. If they do so, income taxes on the amount of the repayment will be refunded to the individual.)
  - Withdrawals by plan participant with terminal illness; (Note: For these purposes, a terminal illness is a participant's illness or physical condition that is reasonably expected to result in death within 84 months of the medical provider's certification.)
  - Withdrawals relating to disaster; (Note: For these purposes, a qualified disaster is any disaster declared by the U.S. president as a major disaster after December 27, 2020. An individual whose principal residence is located in the qualified disaster area during the incident period and experiences an economic loss as a result of the qualified disaster may make a withdrawal related to the disaster.) and
  - Corrective distributions for excess contribution.
- Calls for establishment of a retirement plan "lost and found".
- Allows Roth contributions to SIMPLE and SEP IRAs.
- Allows participant to designate employer matching contributions as Roth contributions.
- Allows employers to make matching retirement contributions based on employee student loan payments.
