= DreamAhead College Investment Plan =

WA529 Invest is a higher education savings program administered by the State of Washington. The plan, created in 2016 by the Washington State Legislature under the name DreamAhead, and statutorily known as the Washington College Savings Plan (RCW 28B.95.032), opened for nationwide participation in 2018. It is one of two 529 programs offered by the state, the other being the Guaranteed Education Tuition Program (now known as GET Prepaid Tuition Plan), which is a prepaid program. The programs are supported by Washington Education Savings Plans (WA529), a division of Washington Student Achievement Council.

== Plan administration ==
WA529 Invest is administered by the Committee on Advanced Tuition Payment and College Savings. TIAA-CREF Tuition Financing, Inc. (TFI), is the plan's Program Manager and investment manager.

== Investment choices ==
A WA529 Invest account can be opened with any amount Once opened, contributions to a WA529 Invest account can be made by check, Automatic Investment Plan (AIP), Electronic Funds Transfer (EFT), Payroll Direct Deposit, Gift Contribution, Rollover from another 529 account, Re-contribution of a refunded distribution, or by moving assets from a child savings or education savings account.

Participants in WA529 Invest can choose between two types of investment options: a Year of Enrollment portfolio, in which the investment allocation is automatically adjusted over time based on the beneficiary's expected year of college enrollment; or a Static Portfolio, in which the account owner can choose a specific investment mix based on their risk tolerance.

== Accolades ==
In 2020, DreamAhead College Investment Plan (as it was known then) was awarded a bronze medal by Morningstar, the first time DreamAhead had achieved a Morningstar rating since its inception. In its announcement naming DreamAhead among "The Top 529 College Savings Plans of 2020", Morningstar stated, "Washington's plan has been on our radar since its launch in 2018, and a deeper dive into the construction of its three risk-based target enrollment suites gave us confidence that the plan will serve Washingtonians well."
