= 529 plan =

United States savings program for educational expenses

A 529 plan, also called a qualified tuition program, is a tax-advantaged investment vehicle in the United States designed to encourage saving for the future higher education expenses of a designated beneficiary. In 2017, K–12 public, private, and religious school tuition were included as qualified expenses for 529 plans along with post-secondary education costs after passage of the Tax Cuts and Jobs Act.

== Overview ==
529 plans are named after section 529 of the Internal Revenue Code—26 U.S.C. § 529. While most plans allow investors from out of state, there can be significant state tax advantages and other benefits, such as matching grant and scholarship opportunities, protection from creditors and exemption from state financial aid calculations for investors who invest in 529 plans in their state of residence. Contributions to 529 college savings plans are made with after-tax dollars. Once money is invested in the account, it grows tax-free, and withdrawals from the plans are not taxed when the money is used for qualified educational expenses. Only 2.5 percent of all families had 529 college savings accounts in 2013. As of August 2020, more than $360 billion was invested in 529 college savings plans.

There are two types of 529 plans: prepaid plans and savings plans.

- Prepaid plans
  - Prepaid plans allow one to purchase tuition credits at today's rates to be used in the future. Therefore, performance is based upon tuition inflation.
  - Prepaid plans may be administered by states or higher education institutions.
  - As of 2024, nine states provide a prepaid tuition plan that is accepting new applicants: Florida, Illinois, Massachusetts, Michigan, Nevada, Pennsylvania, Texas, Virginia, and Washington.
- Savings plans
  - Savings plans are different in that all growth is based upon market performance of the underlying investments, which typically consist of mutual funds and exchange-traded funds (ETF). Investors can select stocks and bonds via preset investment menus.
  - Most 529 savings plans offer a variety of age-based asset allocation options where the underlying investments become more conservative as the beneficiary gets closer to college age.
  - Savings plans may be administered by states only.
    - Although states administer savings plans, record-keeping and administrative services for many savings plans are usually delegated to a mutual fund company or other financial services company.

With the Economic Growth and Tax Relief Reconciliation Act of 2001 (EGTRRA), 529 plans gained their current prominence and tax advantages. Qualified distributions from 529 plans for qualified higher education expenses or tuition for elementary or secondary schools are exempt from federal income tax.

== History ==
529 college savings plans originated from states rather than the federal government. With tuition costs increasing year by year, the state-run prepaid tuition program of Michigan addressed the increasing anxiety on the part of many thousands of Michigan households with the Michigan Education Trust (MET) proposition. This created a fund to which the state's residents could pay a fixed amount in exchange for tuition increases. The initiative sparked interest in other states, which launched their first prepaid tuition program.

Michigan delayed its own launch so that a ruling could be requested from the Internal Revenue Service (IRS) regarding the tax aspect of the arrangement. The IRS allowed purchasers of the "prepaid tuition contract" not to be taxed on the accruing value of the contract until the year in which funds were distributed or refunded. Additionally, the trust fund established by the state of Michigan was required to receive prepayments and be subject to income tax on earnings from the invested funds.

The MET entered into prepaid tuition contracts with Michigan's residents. An estimated 55,000 individuals signed up for the program. MET paid federal income tax on its investment earnings, and in 1990 filed suit for a refund from the IRS. The case was first decided in favor of the IRS, but on appeal in 1994, the Sixth Circuit Court of Appeals reversed the district court judge's decision and found in Michigan's favor.

At one point, MET sold prepaid tuition contracts that were below market value, and the program had to be adjusted with appropriate pricing. Today it remains as one of the largest and most successful prepaid programs.

Subsequently, Congress has passed new legislation authorizing qualified state tuition programs. This is now part of the Small Business Job Protection Act of 1996. Section 529 was added to the Internal Revenue Code, conferring tax exemption to qualifying state programs and deferring tax on participants' undistributed earnings.

Section 529 advanced to the Clinton administration's agenda and became part of the Taxpayer Relief Act of 1997 (TRA). The TRA made changes such as deduction on student loans, penalty-free IRA withdrawals for higher education, and adding room and board to the list of qualifying expenses.

Another provision was added to the bill to make Section 529 distributions tax-free, not just tax-deferred, when used for college. Bill Clinton vetoed this provision.

In 2001, when George W. Bush was president, new tax bills were crafted in both the Senate and the House of Representatives containing the previously vetoed changes.

With limited Democratic support, the Economic Growth and Tax Relief Reconciliation Act of 2001 (EGTRRA) was signed into law on June 7, 2001. Beginning in 2002, however, the Act now exempts those withdrawals from income taxation provided they are used for qualified higher educational expenses.

Due to federal budget constraints, EGTRRA stated that every tax provision within the new law would expire on December 31, 2010. Congressional leaders decided to insert a provision in the Pension Protection Act of 2006 (PPA) that would make all EGTRRA charges to Section 529 permanent, including tax-free treatment for qualified distributions.

Changes to the structure and marketing of 529 plans over the years have contributed to their growth. The states partnered up with the professional investment community, which allowed them to offer 529 plans with the feel of mutual funds. Also, registered brokers and investment advisors can directly assist families in understanding 529 plans and selecting an appropriate investment.

Other changes that have resulted in a growth in adoption include: federal legislation regarding taxes, financial aid, asset protection; ongoing program improvement; lowering of expenses; generous state incentives; positive media coverage; and college savings registries that allow people to sign up for the program. Some employers offer 529 plans to their employees as a benefit, similar to retirement plans, or even with contribution matching.

In 2014, Congress passed the Achieving a Better Life Experience (ABLE) Act, laying the groundwork for ABLE accounts. ABLE, or 529A, accounts are similar to 529 plans, except for the purpose of saving for a disabled beneficiary's special needs.

In his 2015 State of the Union Address, President Obama proposed removing the tax-free status of distributions of 529 plans. He abandoned the proposal after it met with heavy opposition.

The Tax Cuts and Jobs Act of 2017 expanded 529 plans to include K–12 public, private, and religious school tuition. The original plan, called the Cruz amendment (named after Ted Cruz), called for homeschool expenses to also qualify for 529 plans, but the homeschool expenses provision was removed in the Senate reconciliation process, while the K–12 tuition provision was retained. According to the new law, 529 plans can be used to fund all K–12 school tuition costs up to $10,000 per year per child. The SECURE Act further expanded the use of 529 plans to cover student loan repayments. The Tax Cuts and Jobs Act also allowed rollovers from 529 plans to ABLE accounts, as long as the ABLE account beneficiary is the original 529 beneficiary or a qualified family member. The allowed annual rollover amount is set at the standard IRS gift tax exemption, less any other contributions made in the current tax year.

The SECURE 2.0 Act of January 2023 allows for tax and penalty-free rollovers from 529 accounts to Roth IRAs, under certain conditions. Account owners of 529 college savings accounts are permitted to rollover up to $35,000 over the course of their lifetime from any 529 account in their name to a Roth IRA for the designated beneficiary. These rollovers are also subject to Roth IRA annual contribution limits, and the 529 account must have been open for more than 15 years.

== Use for qualified education expenses ==
The funds from a 529 plan are used for qualified education expenses. These expenses are typically tuition, fees, textbooks, computers, and equipment, and are charged to the student in relation to attending an institution defined as any eligible public, non-profit, or private college or university, technical, vocational, or trade institution. Expenses for special needs services needed by a special needs beneficiary must be incurred in connection with enrollment or attendance at an eligible post-secondary school or institution as described previously. For expenses to qualify, the student must be enrolled for at least half the full-time academic workload for the course of study the student is pursuing, as determined under the standards of the school where the student is enrolled. Institutions are considered eligible if they participate in a financial aid program administered by the U.S. Department of Education. This may also include some foreign educational institutions located outside of the United States, but they must be eligible to participate in a financial aid program administered by the U.S. Department of Education as well.

Additionally, as determined by state law, eligible expenses of no more than $10,000 of tuition incurred by a designated beneficiary enrolled in elementary or secondary school may be used at any eligible public, private, or religious school that provides elementary or secondary education.

Room and board are also considered eligible expenses for both on-campus and off-campus housing. For on-campus housing, the expense allowed is the actual amount charged if the student is residing in housing owned or operated by the school. For off-campus housing, the expense is allowed up to the amount allowed for on-campus room and board, as determined by the school, that was included in the cost of attendance (for federal financial aid purposes) for a particular academic period and living arrangement of the student. 529 plan qualified expenses for off-campus housing are not limited to rent. They can include groceries and utilities. For tax purposes, receipts for all qualified expenses must be kept.

Recent changes now allow expenses for fees, books, supplies, and equipment required for the designated beneficiary's participation in an apprenticeship program registered and certified with the Secretary of Labor under section 1 of the National Apprenticeship Act to be considered eligible expenses.

Qualified education expenses formerly did not include student loans and student loan interest. However, on December 12, 2019, the SECURE Act was signed into law, which allows for 529 withdrawals for "principal or interest on any qualified education loan", under certain conditions:

- No more than $10,000 may be withdrawn for the purposes of paying a student loan
- The $10,000 limit is a maximum lifetime limit per beneficiary and sibling

A distribution from a 529 plan that is not used for the above qualified educational expenses is subject to income tax and an additional 10% early-distribution penalty on the earnings portion of the distribution. The tax penalty is waived if any of the following conditions are satisfied:

- The designated beneficiary dies, and the distribution goes to another beneficiary or to the estate of the designated beneficiary.
- The designated beneficiary becomes disabled. People providing proof of being unable to do any substantial gainful activity because of a physical or mental condition are considered disabled. A physician must determine that the individual's condition can be expected to result in death or continue indefinitely.
- The designated beneficiary receives any of the following:
  - a qualified scholarship excludable from gross income
  - veterans' educational assistance
  - employer-provided educational assistance
  - any other nontaxable payments (other than gifts, bequests, or inheritances) received for education expenses
- The distribution is rolled over into an ABLE account whose beneficiary is either the original fund beneficiary or a qualified family member.

== Advantages ==
There are many advantages to the 529 plan:

First, although contributions are not deductible from the donor's federal income tax liability, many states provide state income tax benefits for all or part of the contributions of the donor. Beyond the potential state income tax deduction possibilities, a prime benefit of the 529 plan is that the principal grows tax-deferred, and distributions for the beneficiary's college costs are exempt from tax.

Many states give the account owner a full or partial state income tax deduction or tax credit for their contributions to the state's section 529 plans. So far, a total of 35 states and the District of Columbia offer such a deduction. California, Delaware, Hawaii, Kentucky, Maine, New Jersey, and North Carolina currently have state income taxes but do not offer a state income tax deduction or tax credit for contributions to the state's 529 college savings plan. Alaska, Florida, Nevada, South Dakota, Tennessee, Texas, New Hampshire, Washington, and Wyoming do not have state income taxes. Contributions to other states' section 529 plans are generally not deductible in the account holder's home state. Only Arizona, Arkansas, Kansas, Minnesota, Missouri, Montana, and Pennsylvania provide for state tax parity, where contributions to any state plan are eligible for the state's income tax deduction.

Second, the donor maintains control of the account. With few exceptions, the named beneficiary has no rights to the funds. Most plans allow donors to reclaim the funds at any time for their own use. However, if a "non-qualified" withdrawal is made, the earnings portion will be subject to income tax and an additional 10% penalty tax.

Third, a 529 plan can provide a convenient, hands-off way to save for college. Having selected which 529 plan to use, the donor completes a simple enrollment form and makes a contribution (or signs up for automatic deposits). The ongoing investment of the account is handled by the plan, not by the donor. Plan assets are professionally managed either by the state treasurer's office or by an outside investment company hired as the program manager. The donor will not receive a Form 1099 to report taxable or nontaxable earnings until the year of the withdrawals. If an investment switch is desired, donors may change to a different option in a 529 savings program every year (program permitting) or the account may be rolled over to a different state's program, provided no such rollover for the beneficiary has occurred in the prior 12 months. 529 plans generally have very low minimum start-up and contribution requirements. The fees, compared with other investment vehicles, are low, although this depends on the state administering the plan. Finally, everyone is eligible to take advantage of a 529 plan, and the amounts that can be put in are substantial (over $300,000 per beneficiary in many state plans). Generally, there are no income limitations or age restrictions.

A final advantage of the assets in a 529 plan is that, although they can be reclaimed by the donor (subject to income tax and the 10% additional penalty on any gains), the assets are not counted as part of the donor's gross estate for estate tax purposes. Thus, 529 plans can be used as an estate planning tool to move assets outside of the estate while still retaining some measure of control if the money is needed in the future. A beneficiary must be designated, and the income tax savings are still only obtained if the money is eventually spent for education, though in some cases, estate taxes can be reduced without spending the money on education.

In addition, under the College Cost Reduction and Access Act of 2007, 529 college savings plans and prepaid tuition plans are now treated as an asset of the account owner (typically the parent), meaning they have little impact on a student's eligibility for financial aid.

Under the SECURE Act of 2019, up to $10,000 of funds from a 529 plan can be used towards student loan expenses.

=== Transferable ===
Another benefit associated with 529 Plans is the ability to transfer unused amounts to other qualified members of the beneficiary's family without incurring any tax penalty. According to the IRS website (Publication 970), this type of transfer is known as a Rollover and is explained at length in their Qualified Tuition Program (QTP) section. Any amount paid to another QTP within 60 days of distribution is considered Rolled Over and does not require reporting anywhere on Form 1040 or 1040NR.

Qualified members of the beneficiary's family include the beneficiary's:

- Spouse
- Son, daughter, stepchild, foster child, adopted child, or a descendant of any of them.
- Brother, sister, stepbrother, or stepsister.
- Father or mother or ancestor of either.
- Stepfather or stepmother.
- Son or daughter of a brother or sister.
- Brother or sister of father or mother.
- Son-in-law, daughter-in-law, father-in-law, mother-in-law, brother-in-law, or sister-in-law.
- The spouse of any individual listed above.
- First cousin.

== Disadvantages ==
While the number and types of 529 plans are growing, not all investment vehicles are available in 529 form.

Unlike almost all other types of tax-deferred plans, such as 401(k) plans, IRS rules allow only two exchanges or reallocation of assets per year in a 529 plan. This limitation also applies to ABLE accounts.

The earnings portion of money withdrawn from a 529 plan that is not spent on eligible expenses (or rolled over into an ABLE account for any eligible family member) is subject to income tax, an additional 10% federal tax penalty, and the possibility of a recapture of any state tax deductions or credits taken. For example, if $50,000 is contributed to a 529 plan, where it grows to $60,000 over time, and an unqualified withdrawal is made for the entire amount, the $10,000 gain is taxable, and a 10% penalty on the $10,000 is applicable (i.e., $1,000).

Paying qualified expenses directly from a 529 account that is owned by someone other than the student or parent may reduce a student's eligibility for need-based financial aid.

Paying college expenses directly from a 529 account may reduce eligibility for the American Opportunity Tax Credit, due to IRS coordination restrictions. To claim the full credit (in addition to meeting other criteria, such as income limits), $4,000 of college tuition and textbook expenses per year should be paid from non-529 plan funds.

The 529 plan for the state in which one is domiciled may have higher fees (expense ratios) – which are not required to be disclosed in marketing materials and can range from under 0.4% to more than 1.1% – than the plans of other states. For example, a 529 plan in which $2,000 is deposited each year for 18 years would accumulate over $4,000 in fees with a 1.1% expense ratio but only $1,400 in fees with a 0.4% expense ratio – a savings of $2,600. Generally, direct-sold 529 plans have lower fees than advisor-sold 529 plans.

== Deductibility of losses ==
In certain circumstances where a 529 account has experienced investment losses over the term of its existence, the contributor to the account may withdraw the funds and have the losses deducted from taxable income (but not counted as such for Alternative Minimum Tax purposes).

== Gift tax considerations ==
Contributions to 529 plans are considered gifts under the federal gift tax regulations and hence any contributions in excess of the annual exclusion. The annual exclusion in 2024 is $18,000 if filing single (or $90,000 over five years) or $36,000 if filing married jointly (or $180,000 over five years) count against the one-time gift/estate tax exemption. The five years is known as the five-year carry-forward option: Once the single donor puts in $90,000 or the married jointly donor puts in $180,000, they are not able to make another contribution (gift) to that individual (without using part of their lifetime gifting exclusion) for five years.

Since tuition payments to an educational institution are not subject to the annual gift limitation, parents who are trying to minimize estate taxes may be better off making their annual gifts to another vehicle, such as a Uniform Transfers to Minors Act (UTMA) account and then paying the tuition directly. However, this may significantly reduce the student's eligibility for need-based financial aid.

== See also ==
- ABLE account, codified in Section 529A of the Internal Revenue Code; similar to a 529 plan, but designed for the benefit of people with disabilities
- Coverdell Education Savings Accounts
- Guaranteed Education Tuition Program
- Michigan Education Savings Program
- List of finance topics
- List of personal finance topics
- Registered Education Savings Plan (Canada)
- Texas Tomorrow Fund
- Uniform Gifts to Minors Act
- Virginia 529 College Savings Plan
