= Deferred compensation =

Delayed wage for employees

Deferred compensation is an arrangement in which a portion of an employee's wage is paid out at a later date after which it was earned. Examples of deferred compensation include pensions, retirement plans, and employee stock options. The primary benefit of most deferred compensation is the deferral of tax to the date(s) at which the employee receives the income.

== United States ==
In the US, Internal Revenue Code section 409A regulates the treatment for federal income tax purposes of "non-qualified deferred compensation", the timing of deferral elections, and of distributions.

While technically "deferred compensation" is any arrangement where an employee receives wages after they have earned them, the more common use of the phrase refers to "non-qualified" deferred compensation and a specific part of the tax code that provides a special benefit to corporate executives and other highly compensated corporate employees.

=== Non-qualifying ===
Deferred compensation is a written agreement between an employer and an employee where the employee voluntarily agrees to have part of their compensation withheld by the company, invested on their behalf, and given to them at some pre-specified point in the future. Non-qualifying differs from qualifying in that

1. Employers may also pick and choose which employees they provide deferred compensation benefits to rather than being required to offer the same plan to all employees. This flexibility in the law allows for public entities the choice of whether to provide benefits to different employee bargaining units.
2. They offer flexibility. The employer can treat those chosen differently. The benefit promised need not follow any of the rules associated with qualified plans (e.g., the 25% or $55,000 limit on contributions to defined contribution plans). The vesting schedule can be whatever the employer would like it to be.
3. Companies may provide deferred compensation benefits to independent contractors, not just employees.
4. The employer contributions are not tax-deductible.
5. Employees must pay taxes on deferred compensation at the time such compensation is eligible to be received (not just when it is drawn out).

Deferred compensation is also sometimes referred to as deferred comp, qualified deferred compensation, DC, non-qualified deferred comp, NQDC, or golden handcuffs.

Deferred compensation is only available to employees of public entities, senior management, and other highly compensated employees of companies. Although DC is not restricted to public companies, there must be a serious risk that a key employee could leave for a competitor, and deferred comp is a "sweetener" to try to entice them to stay. If a company is closely held (i.e., owned by a family or a small group of related people), the IRS will look much more closely at the potential risk to the company. A top-producing salesman for a pharmaceutical company could easily find work at a number of good competitors. A parent who jointly owns a business with their children is highly unlikely to leave to go to a competitor. There must be a "substantial risk of forfeiture," or a strong possibility that the employee might leave, for the plan to be tax-deferred. Among other things, the IRS may want to see an independent (unrelated) Board of Directors' evaluation of the arrangement.

=== Qualifying ===
A "qualifying" deferred compensation plan is one complying with the ERISA, the Employee Retirement Income Security Act of 1974. Qualifying plans include 401(k) (for non-government organizations), 403(b) (for public education employers and 501(c)(3) non-profit organizations and ministers), and 457(b) (for state and local government organizations) ERISA, has many regulations, one of which is how much employee income can qualify. (The tax benefits in qualifying plans were intended to encourage lower-to-middle income earners to save more, high-income-earners already having high savings rates.) As of 2008, the maximum qualifying annual income was $230,000. So, for example, if a company declared a 25% profit-sharing contribution, any employee making less than $230,000 could deposit the entire amount of their profit-sharing check (up to $57,500, 25% of $230,000) in their ERISA-qualifying account. For the company CEO making $1,000,000/year, $57,500 would be less than 1/4 of his $250,000 profit-sharing cut. It is for high earners like the CEO, that companies provide "DC" (i.e. deferred compensation plans).

In an ERISA-qualified plan (like a 401(k) plan), the company's contribution to the plan is tax deductible to the plan as soon as it is made, but not taxable to the individual participants until It is withdrawn. So if a company puts $1,000,000 into a 401(k) plan for employees, it writes off $1,000,000 that year.

1. Assets in plans that fall under ERISA (for example, a 401(k) plan) must be put in a trust for the sole benefit of its employees. If a company goes bankrupt, creditors are not allowed to get assets inside the company's ERISA plan. Contrariwise, non-qualifying deferred compensation, because it does not fall under ERISA, is a general asset of the corporation. While the corporation may choose to not invade those assets as a courtesy, legally, they're allowed to and may be forced to give deferred compensation assets to creditors in the case of bankruptcy. A special kind of trust called a rabbi trust (because it was first used in the compensation plan for a rabbi) may be used. A rabbi trust puts a "fence" around the money inside the corporation and protects it from being raided for most uses other than the corporation's bankruptcy/insolvency. However, plan participants may not receive a guarantee that they'll be paid prior to creditors being paid in case of insolvency.
2. ERISA plans may not discriminate in favor of highly compensated employees on a percentage basis. If the president of the company is making $1,000,000/year and a clerk is making $30,000, and the company declares a 25% profit sharing contribution, the president of the company gets to count the first $230,000 only (2008 limit) and put $57,500 into his account and $7,500 into the clerk's account. For the president, $57,500 represents only 5.75% of total income that grows tax deferred, and if the company wants to provide an additional tax incentive, DC may be an option.
3. Federal income tax rates change on a regular basis. If an executive is assuming tax rates will be higher at the time they retire, they should calculate whether or not deferred comp is appropriate. The top federal tax rate in 1975 was 70%. In 2008, it was 35%. If an executive defers compensation at 35% and ends up paying 70%, that was a bad idea. If the reverse is true, it was brilliant. Unfortunately, only time will tell, but the decision to pay the taxes once the rates have changed is irreversible, so careful consideration must be given.

=== Agreements ===
Plans are usually put in place either at the request of executives or as an incentive by the Board of Directors. They're drafted by lawyers, recorded in the Board minutes with parameters defined. There is a doctrine called constructive receipt, which means an executive cannot have control of the investment choices or the option to receive the money whenever he wants. If he is allowed to do either of those two things or both, he often has to pay taxes on it right away. For example: if an executive says, "With my deferred comp money, buy 1,000 shares of Microsoft stock", that is usually too specific to be allowed. If he says, "Put 25% of my money in large cap stocks", that is a much broader parameter.

=== Taxation ===
In an ERISA-qualified plan (like a 401(k) plan), the company's contribution to the plan is deductible to the plan as soon as it is made, but not taxable to the participants until it is withdrawn. So if a company puts $1,000,000 into a 401(k) plan for employees, it writes off $1,000,000 that year. If the company is in the 25% bracket, the NET contribution is $750,000 (because they did not pay $250,000 in taxes - 25% of $1M). This is because the cash flow is still $1M to the Plan to be withdrawn later by the employees - then when tax returns are filed, since the taxable profit is $1M "less", there is an on paper "savings" at the 25% tax rate. In a non-qualified deferred comp plan, the company does not get to deduct the taxes in the year the contribution is made, and they deduct them the year the contribution becomes non-forfeit-able. For example, if ABC company allows SVP John Smith to defer $200,000 of his compensation in 1990, which he will have the right to withdraw for the first time in the year 2000, ABC put the money away for John in 1990, John paid taxes on it in 2000. If John keeps working there after 2000, it does not matter because he was allowed to receive it (or "constructively received") the money in 2000.

=== Other circumstances ===
Most of the provisions around deferred compare related to circumstances the employee controls (such as voluntary termination); however, deferred comp often has a clause that says in the case of the employee's death or permanent disability, the plan will immediately vest, and the employee (or estate) can get the money.

== Deferred compensation as an incentive ==
"When agents remain with an employer for a long period of time, there is no necessary reason why the employer should pay the worker his expected marginal product in all periods; instead, workers could be paid better in some periods than in others. One aspect of this that has attracted both theoretical and empirical interest has been 'deferred compensation,' where workers are overpaid when old, at the cost of being underpaid when young. From this perspective, part of the reason why older workers are better paid than younger workers is not that they are more productive, but simply that they have accumulated enough tenure to garner these contractual returns."

== See also ==
- Remuneration
- Vesting
- Restricted stock
