= Predatory marriage =

Marrying a person to access their estate after their death

Predatory marriage is the practice of marrying an elderly person exclusively for the purpose of gaining access to their estate upon their death. While the requirements for mental capacity to make a valid will are high, in most jurisdictions the requirements for entering into a valid marriage are much lower; even a person suffering dementia may enter into marriage. In many jurisdictions, a marriage arrangement will invalidate any previous will left by the person, resulting in the spouse inheriting the estate.

In the United Kingdom a campaign, Predatory Marriage UK (originally known as Justice for Joan) was started, working to change laws and procedures around marriage to reduce this practice, supported by lawyer Sarah Young of Ridley and Hall. The local MP, Fabian Hamilton MP, introduced a bill in Parliament during 2018 entitled the Marriage and Civil Partnership (Consent) Bill, to establish that marriage should no longer always revoke a previous will and have introduced other protections against predatory marriage. The bill was passed but ran out of parliamentary time, but work is continuing.

== Common scams and methods ==
There are several techniques known to have been employed in targeting vulnerable people in this way, often involving coercive and controlling behavior. One example is convincing a vulnerable person to sign over assets before or after marriage to avoid prenuptials. This can be disguised either as a way to avoid tax or in exchange for care and affection, and is often accompanied with legal documentation purporting to protect the person being scammed but such documentation often does not hold up in court, especially if provided by the scammer.

== See also ==
- Elder financial abuse
- Sham marriage
