= SEP-IRA =

Type of retirement pension account used in the United States

A Simplified Employee Pension Individual Retirement Arrangement (SEP-IRA) is a variation of the Individual Retirement Account used in the United States. SEP-IRAs are adopted by business owners to provide retirement benefits for themselves and their employees. There are no significant administration costs for a self-employed person with no employees. If the self-employed person does have employees, all employees must receive the same benefits under a SEP plan. Since SEP-IRAs are a type of IRA, funds can be invested the same way as most other IRAs.

The deadline for establishing the plan and making contributions is the filing deadline for the employer's tax return, including extensions.

The strictest conditions employers may place on employee eligibility are as follows. The employee must be included if they have:

1. attained age 21
2. worked for the employer in three of the previous five years
3. received at least $650 in compensation for tax year 2021 ($600 for 2019 and for 2020)

Employers may use less restrictive criteria.

SEP-IRA funds are taxed at ordinary income tax rates when qualified withdrawals are taken after age 59 1/2 (as for traditional IRAs). Contributions to a SEP plan are deductible, lowering a taxpayer's income tax liability in the contribution year.

== Contribution limits ==
SEP-IRA contributions are treated as part of a profit-sharing plan. For employees, the employer may contribute up to 25% of the employee's wages to the employee's SEP-IRA account. For example, if an employee earns $40,000 in wages, the employer could contribute up to $10,000 to the SEP-IRA account.

The total contribution to a SEP-IRA account should not exceed a) the lesser of 25% of income (20% for self-employed before self-employed tax deduction is included; see below)); or b) $42,000 (for 2005), $44,000 (2006), $45,000 (2007), $46,000 (2008), $49,000 (2009–2011), $50,000 (2012), $51,000 (2013), $52,000 (2014), $53,000 (2015–2016), $54,000 (2017), $55,000 (2018), $56,000 (2019), $57,000 (2020), $58,000 (2021), $61,000 (2022), $66,000 (2023), or $69,000 (2024) . For 2010 and 2011, the compensation used in the calculation was capped at $245,000 (e.g., an employer making a 10% contribution cannot contribute more than $24,500 for any employee).

=== Self-employed ===
The contribution limit for self-employed persons is more complicated; barring limits, it is 20% of net profit. The computation is in IRS Pub 560, section 5, Table and Worksheets for the Self-Employed, specifically Rate Worksheet for Self-Employed.

Two complications are:

- Federal Insurance Contributions Act tax (FICA)
- Reduced rate

==== FICA tax ====
SEP contribution limits are computed not from net profit but from net profit adjusted for the deduction for self-employment tax (2019 Form 1040 Schedule C, line 31; 2019 Form 1040, Schedule F, line 34; or 2019 Form 1065, Schedule K-1, box 14, code A). Barring limits, this is half the 15.3% FICA tax, levied on net earnings, which is 92.35% of net profit. Therefore, adjusted net profit (net profit minus deduction for self-employment tax) is 92.935225% of net profit, which is close to but slightly more than net earnings.

==== Reduced rate ====
The limit of 25% applies to wages, not (adjusted) net profit. In the above example, where an employee earns $40,000 and the employer contributes 25% of that, $10,000, the employee has received $50,000 total, of which 20% goes to the SEP-IRA.

When a business is a sole proprietorship, the employee/owner both pays themselves wages and may also make a SEP contribution, which is limited to 25% of wages, namely, profits minus SEP contribution. For a particular contribution rate CR, the reduced rate is CR/(1+CR); for a 25% contribution rate, this yields a 20% reduced rate, as in the above.

==== Overall ====
Thus, the overall contribution limit (barring limits) is 20% of 92.9% (that is, 18.6%) of net profit.

For example, if a sole proprietor has $50,000 net profit from self-employment on Schedule C, then the "1/2 of self-employment tax credit", $3,532, shown on adjustments to income at the bottom of form 1040, will be deducted from the net profit. The result is then multiplied by 20% to arrive at the maximum SEP deduction, $9,293.

== Withdrawal rules ==
SEP contributions and earnings are held in SEP-IRAs and can be withdrawn at any time, subject to the general limitations imposed on Traditional IRA. A withdrawal is taxable in the year received. If a participant makes a withdrawal before age 59½, generally a 10% additional tax applies. SEP contributions and earnings may be rolled over tax-free to other Individual retirement account and retirement plans.

SEP contributions and earnings must eventually be distributed following the IRA required IRA Required Minimum Distributions.

== See also ==
- 401(k)
- 457 plan
- Roth IRA
- SIMPLE IRA
- Solo 401(k)
- Traditional IRA
- Form 1099-R
