= Internal Revenue Code section 409A =

Section of the Internal Revenue Code

Section 409A of the United States Internal Revenue Code regulates nonqualified deferred compensation paid by a "service recipient" to a "service provider" by generally imposing a 20% excise tax when certain design or operational rules contained in the section are violated. Service recipients are generally employers, but those who hire independent contractors are also service recipients. Service providers include executives, general employees, some independent contractors and board members, as well as entities that provide services (an LLC, for example, could be a service provider).

== History ==
Section 409A was added to the Internal Revenue Code, effective January 1, 2005, under Section 885 of the American Jobs Creation Act of 2004. The effects of Section 409A are far-reaching, because of the exceptionally broad definition of "deferral of compensation." Section 409A was enacted, in part, in response to the practice of Enron executives accelerating the payments under their deferred compensation plans in order to access the money before the company went bankrupt, and also in part in response to a history of perceived tax-timing abuse due to limited enforcement of the constructive receipt tax doctrine.

== Basic summary ==
Section 409A generally provides that "non-qualified deferred compensation" must comply with various rules regarding the timing of deferrals and distributions. Under regulations issued by the IRS, Section 409A applies whenever there is a "deferral of compensation", which occurs whenever an employee has a legally binding right during a taxable year to compensation that is or may be payable in a later taxable year. There are various exceptions, excluding from the Section 409A rules compensation that would otherwise fall within this definition, including: qualified plans like the pension and 401(k) plans, and welfare benefits including vacation leave, sick leave, disability pay, or death benefit plan. Other exceptions include those for "short-term deferrals" (i.e. payments made within 2.5 months of the year in which the deferred compensation is no longer subject to a substantial risk of forfeiture), certain stock option and stock appreciation rights and certain separation pay plans.

== Qualified and non-qualified deferred compensation ==
Section 409A makes a distinction between deferred compensation plans and deferral of compensation. The term "plan" includes any agreement, method, program, or other arrangement, including an agreement, method, program, or other arrangement that applies to one person or individual.

Section 409A specifies that unless any deferred compensation falls into a specified set of "qualified deferred compensation" categories, the IRS will automatically consider it unqualified deferred compensation. The qualified deferred compensation categories are:

- Qualified employer plans (these are basically employer retirement plans)
- Certain foreign plans
- Section 457 plans
- Certain welfare benefits
- Stock options

== Timing restrictions ==
Section 409A's timing restrictions fall into three main categories:

- restrictions on the timing of distributions
- restrictions against the acceleration of benefits
- restrictions on the timing of deferral elections

Distributions under a nonqualified deferred compensation plan can only be payable upon one of six circumstances:

- the employee's separation from service
- the employee's becoming disabled
- the employee's death
- a fixed time or schedule specified under the plan
- a change in ownership or effective control of the corporation, or a change in the ownership of a substantial portion of the assets of the corporation
- the occurrence of an unforeseeable emergency

In addition, Section 409A provides that with respect to certain "key employees" of publicly traded corporations, distributions upon separation from service must be delayed by an additional six months following separation (or death, if earlier). Key employees are generally the top 50 employees with pay above $150,000.

The rules restricting the timing of elections as to the time or form of payment under a nonqualified deferred compensation plan fall into two categories:

- initial deferral elections
- subsequent deferral elections

As a general rule, initial deferral elections must be made no later than the close of the employee's taxable year immediately preceding the service year. The term "initial deferral elections" includes all decisions, whether made by the employee or employer, as to the time or form of payment under the plan. Once the initial deferral election is made, a change to the time or form of payment under the plan can only be made under the rules governing subsequent deferral elections.

== Penalties ==
Section 409A assigns compliance-failure penalties to the recipient of deferred compensation (the "service provider") and not to the company offering the compensation (the "service recipient"). The sanctions for non-compliance can be severe. The specific penalties written into law are:

- all compensation deferred for the taxable year and all preceding taxable years becomes includible in gross income for the taxable year to the extent the compensation is not subject to a "substantial risk of forfeiture" and has not previously been included in gross income
- accrued interest on the taxable amount
- an additional penalty of 20% of the deferred compensation which is required to be included in gross income

== Impact on privately-held companies ==
One area of concern in early drafts of 409A was the impact on companies with stock that is not readily tradeable on an established securities market and these companies' employees. As of 2014, approximately 8.5 million American workers held stock options. Since options often vest and become taxable more than 1 year after they are granted, it would seem that 409A would apply to this as a form of deferred compensation. However, 409A specifically does not apply to incentive stock options (ISOs) and non-qualified stock options (NSOs) granted at fair market value. However, if a company issues options to a service provider at a valuation below fair market value, section 409A will apply. The fair market value of an option on common stock is defined as the fair market value of the common stock (the underlying security) on the date of issuance. Therefore, the valuation of common stock is critical.

Anticipating this problem, those drafting the regulations created a set of valuation standards for companies. The code provided a way for companies to achieve a safe-harbor valuation. A safe-harbor valuation is one where the IRS must accept the valuation as valid unless the IRS can demonstrate that the valuation is "grossly unreasonable". The code provides three possible ways for companies to achieve a safe-harbor valuation of their common stock:

- Securing an independent appraisal
- Using a generally applicable repurchase formula
- In the case of an illiquid startup, securing a valuation by a qualified individual or individuals applied at a time that the corporation did not otherwise anticipate a change in control event or public offering of the stock

The code defines "illiquid stock of a startup corporation" as stock of a corporation that meets the following criteria:

- the corporation is less than 10 years old
- the corporation has no class of equity security that is publicly traded
- the stock granted is not subject to a put, call or similar derivative
- neither the company nor the stock recipient could reasonably anticipate that the company would be acquired within 90 days or go public within 180 days

Industry commentators pushed for specific guidelines regarding the definition of a "qualified individual" who could perform the valuation for an illiquid startup. The final regulations did not provide specific examples of the qualifications necessary to perform a 409A valuation for an illiquid startup, highlighting that the requisite experience "could be obtained in many ways". However, the final regulations clarified that:

- the standard to be applied is whether it would be reasonable to rely on the advice of the person performing the valuation in deciding whether to accept an offer to purchase or sell the stock being valued and
- having the requisite experience generally means having at least five years of relevant experience in business valuation or appraisal, financial accounting, investment banking, private equity, secured lending, or other comparable experience

Given the small budgets of illiquid startups, many industry participants (including companies and their investors) became frustrated by the need to pay for potentially costly valuations by independent valuation firms. Some valuations could initially cost $50,000, a sum that most startups could never pay. However, recent 409A valuation prices for startup companies have decreased to $1,500–5,000 range, depending on the stage of the company receiving the valuation. For pre-IPO companies and very late-stage companies the prices can be significantly higher as the need for more frequent valuations increases.

== Criticisms of IRC 409A ==
Industry commentators have had ongoing concerns with Section 409A. From its announcement and finalization, the IRS itself has recognized that many industry commentators have expressed concerns about the complexity and reasonableness of several aspects of the law. Particular criticisms have included:

- 409A adds complexity and cost to some business transactions that do not even create tax advantages
- 409A's scope is too broad and captures non-tax-motivated transactions
- Its technical complexity can be a trap to the unaware or unsophisticated
- Its complexity may also limit the ability for people to engage in legitimate deferred compensation transactions

== See also ==
- Nonqualified deferred compensation
