= Rabbi trust =

Type of trust

In the United States, a rabbi trust is a type of trust used by businesses or other entities to defer the taxability to the person or entity receiving (the payee) such payments as employee compensation or purchase payments in the acquisition of another business.

== History ==
The Internal Revenue Service issued a private ruling in 1980 regarding the legality of a trust that members of a synagogue created to compensate their rabbi. Revenue Procedure 92-64 further clarified the acceptable rules for rabbi trusts along with a model trust document and the required features to avoid constructive receipt of income to the employee.

== Applications ==
An example of a rabbi trust applying where an employee receives compensation the taxation of which is deferrable is a nonqualified deferred compensation plan.

A rabbi trust may be applicable when one business purchases another business but wants to set aside part of the purchase price and defer payment as well as taxability to the payee upon the satisfaction of conditions to which both parties agree.

=== Non-qualified deferred compensation plans ===
A non-qualified deferred compensation plan is one under which current income of an employee is deferred and therefore not taxable to the employee. An employer sets aside assets in a separate trust for the employee in the future. Ordinarily, this would cause current inclusion into gross income even though the employer has yet to reduce the money to income because of the economic benefit theory doctrine. Funds deposited in such a plan permitted by a private letter ruling would not result in income, according to Section 83(a) of the Code, if the assets of the trust were available to the employer's general creditors. This is because until the employee is vested, that employee is under a substantial risk of forfeiture and under Section 83(a) and accompanying regulations 1.83-1 and as such is not subject to current inclusion into that employee's gross income.

All non-qualified deferred-compensation plans must involve substantial risk of forfeiture or other methods of avoiding constructive receipt, such as conditioning payment upon performance of future conditions or service. The unique feature of the rabbi trust is that the money placed into the trust is protected from changes of heart of the employer. Once placed in the trust, the money cannot be revoked by decisions made by the employer. As long as the employer's financial position is sound, the money in a rabbi trust is considered to be relatively safe. However, if an employer files for bankruptcy protection, the money may be subject to the claims made by that employer's general unsecured creditors.

=== Acquisition of a business ===
When one business purchases another business, the purchasing business may want to set aside part of the purchase price and defer its payment to the payee upon the satisfaction of conditions to which both parties agree. A rabbi trust may be used in this situation to defer the taxability to the payee of the deferred payments of the purchase price.

For the rabbi trust to be successfully applied, there must be a real risk of forfeiture upon the failure by the payee to fulfill the agreed upon conditions. If the condition is impossible to fail, then constructive receipt may overcome the successful application of the rabbi trust.

== Impact ==
The rabbi trust allows the deferment of compensation whether employment income or the purchase price of a business acquisition, and the absence of this would result in the taxability to the payee of the compensation not yet received by the payee. This would serve as a disincentive for deferring such payments.

== See also ==
- 457 plan
- Internal Revenue Code section 61
- Crummey trust
