= 403(b) =

Type of retirement/pension plan in the United States

In the United States, a 403(b) plan is a U.S. tax-advantaged retirement savings plan available for public education organizations, some non-profit employers (only Internal Revenue Code 501(c)(3) organizations), cooperative hospital service organizations, and self-employed ministers. It has tax treatment similar to a 401(k) plan, especially after the Economic Growth and Tax Relief Reconciliation Act of 2001. Both plans also require that distributions start at age 73 (effective on January 1, 2023 per SECURE Act 2.0), known as Required Minimum Distributions (RMDs). Roth 403(b) accounts are exempt from RMDs beginning in 2024, also per SECURE Act 2.0. Distributions are typically taxed as ordinary income.

Employee salary deferrals into a 403(b) plan are made before income tax is paid and allowed to grow tax-deferred until the money is taxed as income when withdrawn from the plan.

403(b) plans are also referred to as a tax-sheltered annuity (TSA) although since 1974 they no longer are restricted to an annuity form and participants can also invest in mutual funds. A 403(b) account that is able to invest directly in mutual funds is referred to as a 403(b)(7) account or a tax-sheltered custodial account (TSCA).

== Regulation ==
The Employee Retirement Income Security Act (ERISA) does not require 403(b) plans to be technically "qualified" plans (i.e., plans governed by U.S. Tax Code 401(a)), but 403(b) plans have the same general appearance as qualified plans. While the option is available it is not known how prevalent or if any 403(b) plan has been started or amended to be ERISA-qualified. This is because the main advantage of ERISA plans for participants has been in the event of bankruptcy of the account holder, but this advantage ceased to exist after the October 2007 Bankruptcy Abuse Prevention and Consumer Protection Act extended bankruptcy protection to 403(b) plans. While they are different in some fundamental ways, qualified and unqualified plans appear almost the same to the participant and the options available are very similar. The only important differences for the participants are some additional ways that they can withdraw employer money, not salary-deferral money, before the typical 59½ age restriction, but only if the plan is funded with annuities and not mutual funds. The federal government wants to eliminate this difference in proposed regulations expected to be finalized in 2007.

From a plan administration standpoint, 403(b) plans do not have many of the same technical difficulties that 401(k) plans do, such as discrimination testing, especially if the plan is not an ERISA plan. If the plan is an ERISA plan (the employer makes contributions to employee accounts) there are additional restrictions and administrative issues applicable to those employer contributions, but not if a plan of a government employer which is not subject to discrimination testing.

Salary-deferral contributions are not subject to discrimination testing. 403(b) plans are instead subject to universal availability which, briefly and in general, means all employees must be permitted to make salary-deferral contributions. 403(b) plans also have simpler and less costly annual reporting requirements on Internal Revenue Service (IRS) Form 5500, including not having the independent auditor requirement applicable to qualified plans with more than 100 plan participants.

== Compliance ==
On December 9, 2008, the IRS gave 403(b) plan sponsors a one-year reprieve for adopting a written plan document. While the relief provisions from the IRS give 403(b) sponsors a full year to adopt a written plan document, the plans still must operate in compliance with 403(b) plan requirements. If a person has taken a 403(b) plan and their age is less than 59½, then they cannot initiate an early withdrawal unless they can demonstrate a triggering event such as financial hardship, disability, or separation from service. In this event, the IRS will also charge a mandatory 10% in federal taxes, and it is additionally taxed as ordinary income.

== Bankruptcy protection before 2005 ==
Before the passage of the bankruptcy reform act in 2005, a 403(b) that was not an ERISA plan was not accorded protected status as property that could be claimed as exempt by the debtor under the U.S. Bankruptcy Code. In In re Barnes, 264 B.R. 415 (Bankr. E.D. Mich. 2001) Judge Spector held that the fixed-income annuity was not such a trust and could be reached by creditors. The variable account was held to fall within 541(c)(2) and was thus protected. Under the revised bankruptcy laws, 403(b) accounts, IRAs, and other retirement accounts are, in general, protected from creditors in bankruptcy.

For this reason, having an ERISA anti-alienation clause was protective of pensions before the bankruptcy law revisions, giving those pensions the same protection as a spendthrift trust. Some critics argued that this is disparate treatment of similar pension schemes and that more consistent protection was called for. The United States Congress took this argument to heart in the 2005 bankruptcy reform.

== After-tax contributions ==
Beginning in 2006, 403(b) and 401(k) plans may also include designated Roth contributions, i.e., after-tax contributions, which will allow tax-free withdrawals if certain requirements are met. Primarily, the designated Roth contributions have to be in the plan for at least five taxable years and the account holder must be at least 59 years of age.

== Church plans ==
A church plan is a retirement plan established and maintained by a tax-exempt church, a convention of churches, or an association of churches for its employees. Church plans are not subject to the Employee Retirement Income Security Act of 1974 (ERISA) unless it voluntarily makes an irrevocable election to be subject to ERISA.

A church plan may be a defined benefit plan, a defined contribution plan, or a deferred compensation plan.

A church plan that is not subject to ERISA is not required to file an IRS Form 5500, nor is it required to distribute summary annual reports, summary plan descriptions, or summaries of material modifications to plan participants. Church plans are generally subject to state law though. A defined benefit church plan is not required to pay subject to Pension Benefit Guaranty Corporation plan termination insurance.

== See also ==
- 401(k)
- 401(a)
- 457 plan
- Form 1099-R
- Individual retirement account
- List of finance topics
- Taxation in the United States
- Thrift Savings Plan
