= Rathkeale Rovers =

Irish crime group

Rathkeale Rovers clan
- Territory: Rathkeale Ireland, United Kingdom, Australia, Netherland, United States
- Ethnicity: Irish Travellers
- Membership: 30 members and several hundred associates
- Activities: theft, fraud, drug trafficking, money laundering
- Rivals: internal conflicts between families

The Rathkeale Rovers are a group of criminals based in Ireland but operating internationally. They are all members of Ireland's Travelling Community, and use traditional Traveller work such as laying tarmac or home renovation as cover for illegal activities. Their name comes from their links with the town of Rathkeale in Ireland, which has been described as their "base".

The gang originated and operates mainly out of Ireland. The man who originated the Rathkeale Rovers was "Sammy Buckshot" (real name Simon Quilligan) who was a small antiques dealer. The Rovers were then mainly carried on by the O'Brien family. The O'Briens were the members who originally started the theft of rhino horns from museums in 2010.

The gang's crimes include fraud such as the tarmac scam, money laundering, drug smuggling, and art theft.

The European Union's law enforcement agency, Europol, set up Operation Oakleaf in 2011 at the request of the Garda Síochána (Irish police), in order to gather intelligence on the group. This led to 30 arrests in eight countries for money laundering, drug trafficking and organised robbery worldwide.

The United States Fish and Wildlife Service has also investigated the group for smuggling rhinoceros horns. Investigators worked with South African police and Europol.

In October 2013, the New South Wales Fair Trading department issued a warning that the gang was operating on the Australian eastern seaboard.

In November 2013, UK police from 26 forces and the Serious Organised Crime Agency arrested 19 people, believed to be members of the Rathkeale Rovers, as part of the Operation Elven investigation into a series of museum and auction house break-ins in 2012. Fourteen men were later convicted for their roles in the thefts. The 14 received prison sentences ranging from 15 months to six years and eight months (the maximum penalty for the charge is seven years). Four of them, all from the same family, were described by the prosecution as "generals" within the Rathkeale Rovers. The gang targeted Chinese antiquities and rhinoceros horns, intending to sell them to the Chinese black market.

On 13 April 2012, the gang broke into Cambridge University's Fitzwilliam Museum while it was closed, stealing 18 jade objects valued at between £15m and £40m, none of which have been recovered and most probably ended up in China. They targeted Durham University Oriental Museum three times, on one occasion smashing a large hole through an external wall to gain access. Attempted thefts at Norwich Castle Museum and Gorringes auction house in Lewes were thwarted by visitors. The total value of the items taken was between £18m and £57m, according to the police. After the sentencing of the 14, a police spokesman said that there were other members of the Rathkeale Rovers still at large in the UK.

In 2013, the United States arrested the Rathkeale Rovers on US soil. There were 14 arrests made according to the Fish and Wildlife Service's chief of law enforcement.
