= Tarmac scam =

Confidence trick

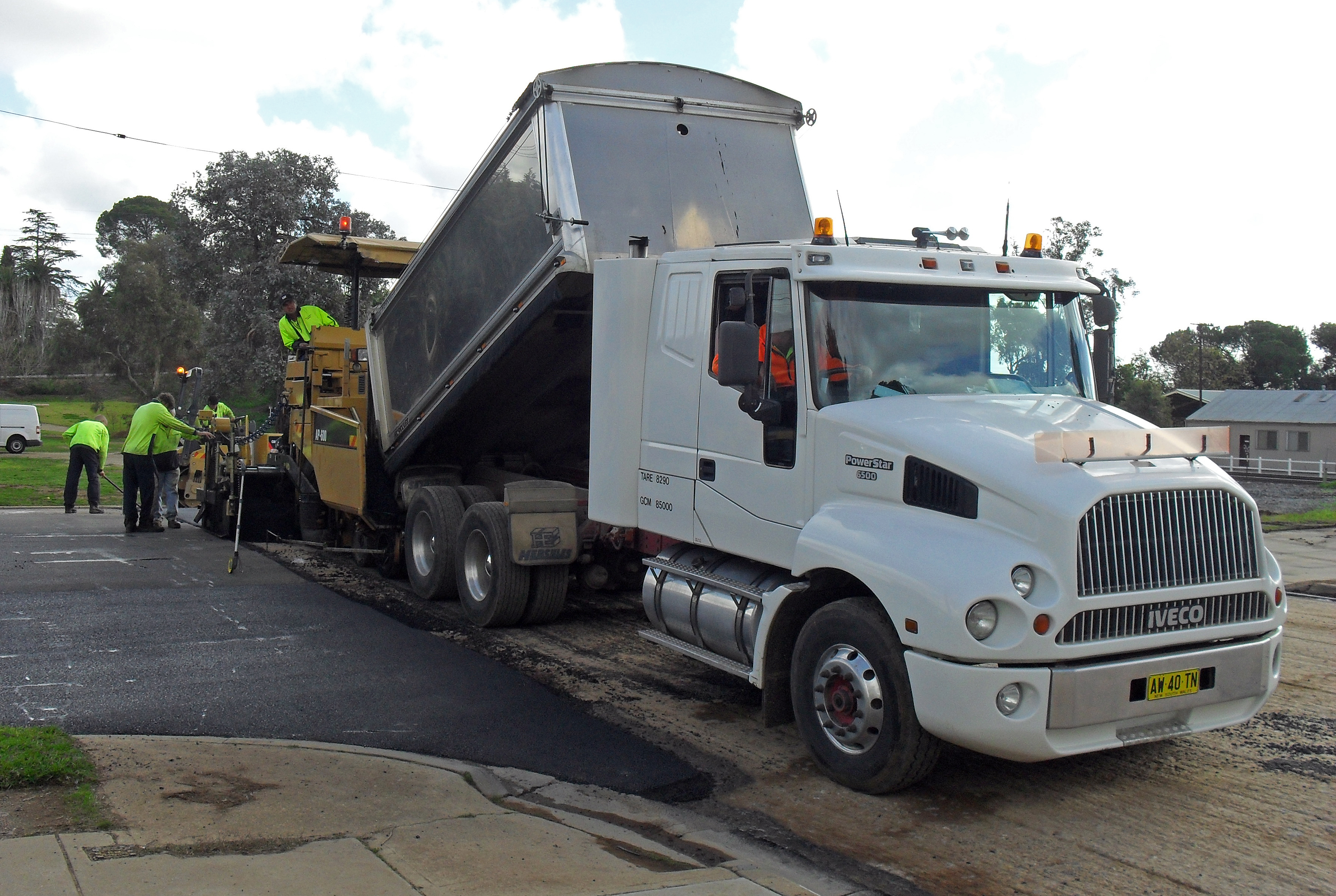
Genuine road resurfacing, Australia

The tarmac scam is a confidence trick in which criminals sell fake or shoddy tarmac (asphalt) and driveway resurfacing. It is particularly common in Europe but practiced worldwide. Other names include the paving scam, tarmacking, the asphalt scam, driveway fraud or similar variants. Non-English names include "Truffa dell'asfalto" (Italian), "Teerkolonne" (German) and "faux bitumeurs" (French).

== Method ==
A conman typically goes door-to-door, claiming to be a builder working on a contract who has some leftover tarmac, and offering to pave a driveway at a low cost.

The paving is in fact often simply gravel chippings covered with engine oil, or not the right depth and type of materials to form a lasting road surface. Milk has been used to make a fake sealant.

The conmen may target elderly, vulnerable residents, and claim to be official contractors working on roadworks to add credibility. Reported escalation has included increasing the cost, claiming that the job has required more material than expected, and making threats.

== Criminals ==
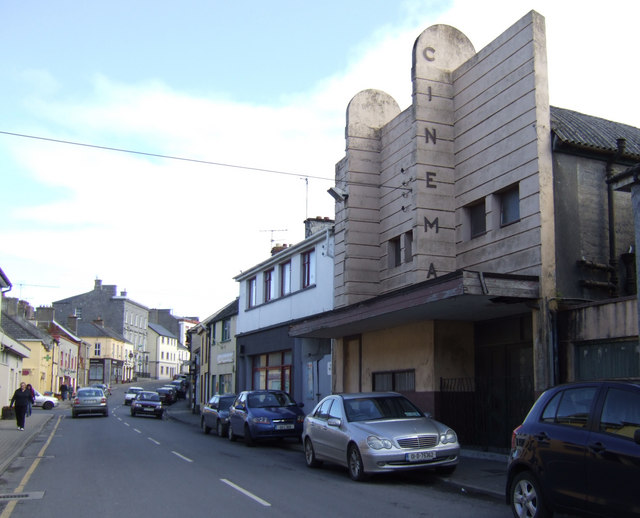
Rathkeale, County Limerick, Ireland, the base of many tarmac scam gangs

Tarmac fraud is particularly associated with the Rathkeale Rovers and other gangs from the Irish traveller community. The organiser of the scheme may lead a gang of low-paid workers, or human trafficking victims. Cases have been reported since the 1980s.

Irish crime reporter Eamon Dillon, an expert on the gangs involved, interviewed a builder who worked with a gang who said that they had custom-built lorries which could never do a proper job: "a proper tarring lorry will have sixty jets, our tar lorries have eight". In another case, the equipment was rented in Romania and then never returned. Another gang used a lorry with Highways Agency branding.

The relative mundanity of tarmacking may have made it a low priority for law enforcement. Dillon has estimated that the scheme may earn up to $140 million a year and that in 2010 there were 20 gangs active in Italy alone, earning €2 million a week.
