= Virginia 529 College Savings Plan =

Independent state agency

Virginia529 (VA 529) or Virginia529 College Savings Plan is the independent state agency responsible for Section 529 qualified tuition programs offered by the Commonwealth of Virginia. Since 2018, Morningstar has named Virginia's Invest529 plan among the top 529 college savings plans in its annual analysis. According to U.S. News & World Report, Virginia's 529 offers a "whopping" 27 funds and six multi-fund options in its static track. Further, US News reports that "Morningstar applauds the plan’s low costs, relative to other advisor-sold programs."
