= Michigan Education Savings Program =

The Michigan Education Savings Program (MESP) is a 529 savings plan that is administered by the Michigan Department of Treasury. Michigan residents who contribute to this plan can deduct up to $5,000 (up to $10,000 for joint filers) from their state income tax each year. MI State Matching Grants based on MESP contributions are not currently available. If state appropriations become available in the future, the State Matching Grant program will be reinstated.

In 2020, MESP was highly rated for its glide path and low fee in Morningstar's annual analysis of 529 college savings plans.
