= Economic Growth and Tax Relief Reconciliation Act of 2001 =

American legislation

- Long title: An act to provide for reconciliation pursuant to section 104 of the concurrent resolution on the budget for fiscal year 2002.
- Acronyms (colloquial): EGTRRA
- Enacted by: the 107th United States Congress

Citations
- Public law: Public Law 107-16

Legislative history
- Introduced in the House as H.R. 1836 by Bill Thomas (R–CA) on May 15, 2001; Committee consideration by House Committee on Ways and Means; Passed the House on May 16, 2001 (230–197); Passed the Senate on May 26, 2001 (58–33); Signed into law by President George W. Bush on June 7, 2001

Major amendments
- Tax Relief, Unemployment Insurance Reauthorization, and Job Creation Act of 2010

The Economic Growth and Tax Relief Reconciliation Act of 2001 was a major piece of tax legislation passed by the 107th United States Congress and signed by President George W. Bush. It is also known by its abbreviation EGTRRA (often pronounced "egg-tra" or "egg-terra"), and is often referred to as one of the two "Bush tax cuts".

Bush had made tax cuts the centerpiece of his campaign in the 2000 presidential election, and he introduced a major tax cut proposal shortly after taking office. Though a handful of Democrats supported the bill, most support came from congressional Republicans. The bill was passed by Congress in May 2001, and signed into law by Bush on June 7, 2001. Due to the narrow Republican majority in the United States Senate, EGTRRA was passed using the reconciliation process, which bypasses the Senate filibuster.

EGTRRA lowered federal income tax rates, reducing the top tax rate from 39.6 percent to 35 percent and reducing rates for several other tax brackets. The act also reduced capital gain taxes, raised pre-tax contribution limits for defined contribution plans and Individual Retirement Accounts, and reduced the estate tax. In 2003, Bush signed another bill, the Jobs and Growth Tax Relief Reconciliation Act of 2003, which contained further tax cuts and accelerated certain tax changes that were part of EGTRRA. Due to the rules concerning reconciliation, EGTRRA contained a sunset provision that would end the tax cuts in 2011, but most of the cuts were made permanent with the passage of the American Taxpayer Relief Act of 2012.

== Legislative history ==
Bush's promise to cut taxes was the centerpiece of his 2000 presidential campaign, and upon taking office, he made tax cuts his first major legislative priority. A budget surplus had developed during the Bill Clinton administration, and with the Federal Reserve Chairman Alan Greenspan's support, Bush argued that the best use of the surplus was to lower taxes. By the time Bush took office, reduced economic growth had led to less robust federal budgetary projections, but Bush maintained that tax cuts were necessary to boost economic growth. After Treasury Secretary Paul O'Neill expressed concerns over the tax cut's size and the possibility of future deficits, Vice President Cheney took charge of writing the bill, which the administration proposed to Congress in March 2001.

Bush initially sought a $1.6 trillion tax cut over a ten-year period, but ultimately settled for a $1.35 trillion tax cut. The administration rejected the idea of "triggers" that would phase out the tax reductions should the government again run deficits. The Economic Growth and Tax Relief Reconciliation Act won the support of congressional Republicans and a minority of congressional Democrats, passing in the House on May 16. The bill was then passed in the Senate on May 26. President Bush signed it into law in June 2001. The narrow Republican majority in the Senate necessitated the use of the reconciliation, which in turn necessitated that the tax cuts would phase out in 2011 barring further legislative action.

== Sunset provision ==
One of the most notable characteristics of the EGTRRA is that its provisions were designed to "sunset" (or revert to the provisions that were in effect before it was passed) on January 1, 2011 (that is, for tax years, plan years, and limitation years that begin after December 31, 2010). After a two-year extension by the Tax Relief, Unemployment Insurance Reauthorization, and Job Creation Act of 2010, the Bush era rates for taxpayers making less than $400,000 per year ($450,000 for married couples) were ultimately made permanent by the American Taxpayer Relief Act of 2012. The sunset provision allowed the EGTRRA to sidestep the Byrd Rule, a Senate rule that amends the Congressional Budget Act to allow Senators to block a piece of legislation if it purports a significant increase in the federal deficit beyond ten years. The sunset allowed the bill to stay within the letter of the PAYGO law while removing nearly $700 billion from amounts that would have triggered PAYGO sequestration.

== Tax rebate ==
In addition to the tax cuts implemented by the EGTRRA, it initiated a series of rebates for all taxpayers that filed a tax return for 2000. The rebate was up to a maximum of $300 for single filers with no dependents, $500 for single parents, and $600 for married couples. Anybody who paid less than their maximum rebate amount in net taxes received that amount, meaning some people who did not pay any taxes did not receive rebates. The rebates were automatic for anybody who filed their 2000 tax return on time, or filed for an extension and quickly sent a return. If an eligible person did not receive a rebate check by December 2001, then they could apply for the rebate in their 2001 tax return.

== Major tax areas affected ==
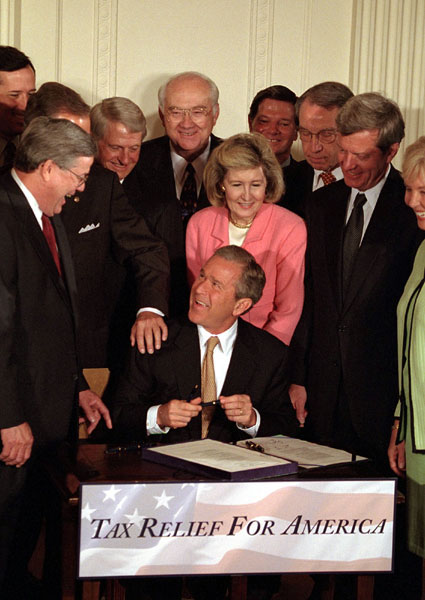
President George W. Bush signing the Economic Growth and Tax Relief Reconciliation Act of 2001 in the White House East Room on June 7, 2001

=== Income tax ===
EGTRRA generally reduced the rates of individual income taxes:

- a new 10% bracket was created for single filers with taxable income up to $6,000, joint filers up to $12,000, and heads of households up to $10,000.
- the 15% bracket's lower threshold was indexed to the new 10% bracket
- the 28% bracket would be lowered to 25% by 2006.
- the 31% bracket would be lowered to 28% by 2006
- the 36% bracket would be lowered to 33% by 2006
- the 39.6% bracket would be lowered to 35% by 2006

The EGTRRA in many cases lowered the taxes on married couples filing jointly by increasing the standard deduction for joint filers to between 164% and 200% of the deduction for single filers.

Additionally, EGTRRA increased the per-child tax credit and the amount eligible for credit spent on dependent child care, phased out limits on itemized deductions and personal exemptions for higher income taxpayers, and increased the exemption for the Alternative Minimum Tax, and created a new depreciation deduction for qualified property owners.

=== Capital gains tax ===
The capital gains tax on qualified gains of property or stock held for five years was reduced from 10% to 8% for those in the 15% income tax bracket.

=== Qualified and retirement plans ===
EGTRRA introduced sweeping changes to retirement plans, incorporating many of the so-called Portman-Cardin provisions proposed by those House members in 2000 and earlier in 2001. Overall it raised pre-tax contribution limits for defined contribution plans and Individual Retirement Accounts (IRAs), increased defined benefit compensation limits, made non-qualified retirement plans more flexible and more similar to qualified plans such as 401(k)s, and created a "catch-up" provision for older workers.

EGTRRA allows, for the first time, for participants in non-qualified 401(a) money purchase, 403(b) tax-sheltered annuity, and governmental 457(b) deferred compensation plans (but not tax-exempt 457 plans) to "roll over" their money and consolidate accounts, whether to a different non-qualified plan, to a qualified plan such as a 401(k), or to an IRA. Prior rules only allowed plan moneys to leave the plan and maintain its tax deferred status only if the money went directly to an IRA or to an IRA and back into a "like kind" defined contribution retirement account. For example, 403(b) moneys leaving the old employer could only go to the new employer's defined contribution plan if it were also a 403(b). Now the old 401(k) plan money could be transferred directly in a trustee-to-trustee "rollover" to an IRA and then from the IRA to a new employer's 403(b) or the entire transfer could be directly from the old employer's 403(b) to the new employer's 401(k). That the new Tax Act allows employers to do so does not mean that any employer is forced to accept new money from the outside.

The so-called "catch-up" provision allows employees over the age of 50 to make additional contributions to their retirement plans over and above the normal limits. For workers who are already retired, the law raises the age for minimum required distributions (MRDs), directing the Treasury to revise its life expectancy tables and simplify MRD rules.

EGTRRA created two new retirement savings vehicles. The Deemed IRA or Sidecar IRA is a Roth IRA attached as a separate account to an employer-sponsored retirement plan; while the differing tax treatment is preserved for the employee, the funds may be commingled for investment purposes. It is an improvement upon the unpopular qualified voluntary employee contribution (QVEC) provision developed in the early 1980s. The so-called Roth 401(k)/403(b) is a new tax-qualified employer-sponsored retirement plan to become effective in 2006, and would offer tax treatment in a retirement plan similar to that offered to account holders of Roth IRAs.

For plan sponsors, the law requires involuntary cash-out distributions of 401(k) accounts into a default IRA. It accelerates the mandatory vesting schedule applied to matching contributions, but increases the portion of employer contributions permitted from profit sharing. Small employers are granted tax incentives to offer retirement plans to their employees, and sole proprietors, partners and S corporation shareholders gain the right to take loans from their company pension plans.

=== Educational savings incentives ===
House Republicans pushed Congress to provide incentives for those investing in education. One bill in the house was proposed to remove the time limit on student loan interest deductions. Their push was successful and was included in the final bill.

=== Estate and gift tax rules ===
The EGTRRA made sweeping changes to the estate tax, gift tax, and generation-skipping transfer tax.

- The estate tax unified credit exclusion, which was $675,000 in 2001 but scheduled to increase by steps to $1,000,000 in 2006, was increased to $1,000,000 in 2002, $1,500,000 in 2004, $2,000,000 in 2006, and $3,500,000 in 2009, with repeal of the estate tax and generation-skipping tax scheduled for 2010.
- The maximum estate tax, gift tax, and generation-skipping tax rate, which was 55% in 2001 (with an additional 5% for estates over $10,000,000 in order to eliminate the benefit of the lower estate tax brackets) was reduced to 50% in 2002, with an additional 1% reduction each year until 2007, when the top estate tax rate became 45%. P.L. 107-16 amended Code Section 2001 to change the rate to 49% in 2003, going down by 1% each year through 2009. (Because of the increasing exclusion and decreasing top tax rate, the estate tax effectively became a tax of 45% on estates over $2,000,000 in 2007.)
- The state estate tax credit, which effectively gave the states a part of the estate tax otherwise payable to the federal government, was phased out between 2002 and 2005 and replaced by a deduction for state estate taxes in 2005.
- The gift tax was not repealed, and the unified credit exclusion has remained at $1,000,000 for gift tax purposes despite the increases in the estate tax exclusion, but the maximum gift tax rate was reduced to 35% beginning in 2010.
- Because of the repeal of the estate tax in 2010, complicated new "carry-over basis" provisions were enacted which would increase the income tax on capital gains realized by some estates and heirs. (Under pre-EGTRRA law, property that is subject to estate tax gets a new income tax basis equal to fair market value, eliminating any capital gain on lifetime appreciation.)

Because EGTRRA was subject to a "sunset" provision, the estate, gift, and generation-skipping taxes were automatically supposed to be reinstated in 2011.

== Impact ==
After the tax bill was passed, Senator Jim Jeffords left the Republican Party and began caucusing with the Democrats, giving them control of the Senate. After Republicans re-took control of the Senate during the 2002 mid-term elections, Bush proposed further tax cuts. With little support among Democrats, Congress passed the Jobs and Growth Tax Relief Reconciliation Act of 2003("JGTRRA"), which cut taxes by another $350 billion over 10 years. That law also lowered the capital gains tax and taxes on dividends. Collectively, the Bush tax cuts reduced federal individual tax rates to their lowest level since World War II, and government revenue as a share of gross domestic product declined from 20.9% in 2000 to 16.3% in 2004.

A 2012 Congressional Budget Office analysis found that the tax cut reduced federal tax receipts by $1.2 trillion over ten years.

== See also ==
- Starve the beast, a post-1970s taxation/budget policy
- Bush tax cuts
