= Elder financial abuse =

Depriving an elderly person of their financial resources

Elder financial abuse is a type of elder abuse in which misappropriation of financial resources or abusive use of financial control, in the context of a relationship where there is an expectation of trust, causes harm to an older person.

The Older Americans Act of 2006 defines elder financial abuse, or financial exploitation, as “the fraudulent or otherwise illegal, unauthorized, or improper act or process of an individual, including a caregiver or fiduciary, that uses the resources of an older individual for monetary or personal benefit, profit, or gain, or that results in depriving an older individual of rightful access to, or use of, benefits, resources, belongings, or assets.”

== Types ==
=== By family or caregivers ===
Family members and informal or paid caregivers have special access to seniors and thus are often in a position to inflict financial abuse through deception, coercion, misrepresentation, undue influence, or theft. Common abusive practices include:

- Money or property is used without the senior's permission or taken from them, for example, removal from their home and then use of the home by the abuser, or depositing income such as pension or benefit checks
- The senior's signature is forged or identity is misappropriated for financial transactions
- The senior is coerced or influenced to sign over deeds or wills, or caused to execute legal documents they do not understand
- The abuser fraudulently obtains a power of attorney or guardianship
- Money is borrowed from the senior and never repaid

Family members engaged in financial abuse of the elderly may include spouses, siblings, children, grandchildren or other relatives. They may engage in the activity because they feel justified; for instance, they are taking what they might later inherit, have a sense of "entitlement" due to a negative personal relationship with the older person, or believe it is somehow the price of a promise of lifelong care. Or they may take money or property to prevent other family members from receiving it, or out of fear that their inheritance may be lost due to the cost of treating illnesses. Sometimes, family members take money or property from their elders because of gambling or other financial problems or substance abuse.

=== Scams and fraud targeting seniors ===
Seniors are also often deliberately targeted by scams, fraud, and misleading marketing – often by otherwise legitimate businesses. This may include:

- 419 scams
- Charitable giving scams, including pressure to rewrite wills
- Fake pharmaceutical or diet/health products
- Fraudulent contracts (such as extended car or home warranties, which in reality cover nothing)
- Fraudulent investment or insurance schemes
- Identity theft
- Lottery scams
- Medical billing scams and unnecessary medical care
- Predatory or unnecessary lending (e.g. reverse mortgages)
- Tarmac scams
- Technical support scam and IRS impersonation scams, in which an elderly person may be cajoled or threatened into paying large sums of money in the form of bank transfers or gift cards
- Unauthorized charges imposed by internet service providers
- Work-at-home scheme or other ways to generate income
- Worthless "sweepstakess" that elderly persons must pay in order to collect winnings

A 1996 study by AARP found that while individuals over 50 comprised 35% of the American population, they accounted for 57% of all fraud victims (AARP, 1996). Seniors' vulnerability to this type of exploitation varies by scam type. For example, the AARP found that lottery fraud victims were more likely to be women over 70 living alone, with lower education, lower income, and less financial literacy, while victims of investment fraud were more likely to be men between the ages of 55 and 62 who were married, with higher incomes and greater financial literacy.

=== Hybrid financial exploitation ===
Hybrid Financial Exploitation (HFE) is financial exploitation that co-occurs with physical abuse and/or neglect. HFE victims are more likely to be cohabiting with an abusive individual, to have fair/poor health, to fear the abusive individual, to perceive the abusive individual as a caretaker, and to have a longer duration of abuse.

== Estimates of size and scope ==
Various attempts have been made to estimate the size and scope of the problem. The primary difficulties in estimating the size of the problem are:

- Differing descriptions of financial abuse – Victims often do not identify as having been a victim of fraud, so researchers generally offer respondents specific examples. The more specific the questions are, the more likely someone is to say they have experienced it – for example, surveys focused on identity theft, telemarketing, "gray charges," or investor fraud have found much higher rates than general surveys.
- Underreporting – Studies that rely on government databases or press reports are estimated to be off by factors ranging from five to forty, with 25 being a frequently cited number. Additionally, because of the stigma of victimhood, caregivers are more likely to report that their parents have been victimized than the parents are to self-report as victims.
- Differences in survey methodology – Some surveys ask for losses in the last year, some ask about losses in the last five years, and some ask "have you ever experienced…", and surveys have variously defined seniors as aged 45+, 50+, 60+, and 65+.

| Author | Year | Estimated impact | Notes |
|---|---|---|---|
| FBI Internet Crime Complaint Center | 2025 | 201,266 complaints from people aged 60 and over, reporting $7.748 billion in losses, with an average loss of $38,500 | Counts only complaints filed with the IC3; it is not a population survey. Giving an age is optional, and complaints with no age are left out of the age figures. Compared with 2024, complaints rose 37% and losses rose 59%. |
| Consumer Financial Protection Bureau | 2017 | 63,500 suspicious activity reports on elder financial exploitation, covering $1.7 billion in actual losses and attempted thefts | Based on reports filed by banks, money services businesses and other financial institutions with the Financial Crimes Enforcement Network. The total leaves out the largest 1% of reports by dollar amount. The bureau says the 2017 reports probably cover only a tiny fraction of actual cases. Filings quadrupled from 2013 to 2017. In a sample of reports from 2013 to 2017, the average loss per older adult was $34,200. The report cites earlier estimates of yearly losses to older adults, from studies by MetLife and True Link, ranging from $2.9 billion to $36.5 billion. It attributes the wide gap mainly to differences in definitions and methods, and notes that both studies extrapolated from samples to the whole older population of the United States. |
| True Link | 2015 | $36 billion in annual losses | The study found that 37% of seniors were affected over any given five-year period, consistent with 15% annual victimization rates found elsewhere. They do not provide a loss per incident but found that any given victim loses approximately $11,600 over five years. |
| Allianz | 2014 | 5% of seniors report having lost money to scams, with average losses of $30,000, meaning that seniors alive in 2014 have experienced $69 billion in total losses due to financial abuse. The study does not provide an annualized figure. | The study also noted that one in five adults 40‐64 reported having an older friend or family member who has been a victim, suggesting it may be underreported by a factor of two to four versus the self-report. |
| MetLife | 2011 | 1,256 incidents per year reported in the press resulting in $2.9 billion in losses. There is no explicit estimate of how much is lost to incidents not reported in the press. | Their estimate is based on an estimated 1,256 incidents of financial abuse reported in the press, out of approximately 40 million seniors. The report acknowledges that estimating based solely on press reports will yield an underestimation by a factor of 5 to 40. The study also found that about one-third of incidents were committed by family and friends, with the remainder by strangers or businesses. |
| New York State | 2011 | 5.2% of seniors experience financial abuse by family members | Only includes financial abuse by family members in the past year among adults 60+. Other studies have suggested that about a third of incidents involve a family member or friend, so this is also consistent with a 15% victimization rate. |
| Investor Protection Trust | 2010 | 20% have been affected by financial services swindles in the past | IPT defined swindles as "inappropriate investment, unreasonably high fees for financial services, or outright fraud." |
| MetLife | 2009 | 1,076 incidents per year resulting in $2.6 billion in losses | Based on only fraud reported in the press. The report acknowledges that estimating based solely on press reports will yield an underestimate by a factor of five, though other estimates suggest it may be closer to a factor of forty. |
| Federal Trade Commission | 2007 | 14% of people (all ages) experience fraud loss of $50 billion in total | The Stanford Center on Aging inflation-adjusted this to 2012 dollars. They also cited another report listing a 15% victimization rate and average losses of $216 per victim. Another study found a 14% victimization rate among seniors. |
| AARP | 2003 | 4% of adults 45+ self-reported experiencing a "major consumer swindle or fraud" in the last year | |
| Senate Committee on Aging | 2000 | Americans (all ages) lose $90 billion per year to telemarketing fraud and identity theft. | This is often combined with AARP and NASAA studies that suggest that approximately half of fraud victims are seniors to arrive at a number around $40-$50 billion. |

== Nonfinancial effects ==
Other effects include damage to credit, missing work, depression, and loss of sleep.

== See also ==
- Internet Crime Complaint Center
