= SECURE Act =

2019 United States federal legislation

Setting Every Community Up for Retirement Enhancement Act of 2019
- Long title: Making further consolidated appropriations for the fiscal year ending September 30, 2020, and for other purposes
- Acronyms (colloquial): SECURE Act
- Nicknames: SECURE Act
- Announced in: the 116th United States Congress
- Number of co-sponsors: 304

Codification
- Acts affected: Internal Revenue Code of 1986; Employee Retirement Income Security Act of 1974
- Agencies affected: Internal Revenue Service; United States Department of Labor; United States Department of the Treasury

Legislative history
- Introduced in the House of Representatives as H.R. 1994 by Richard Neal (D–MA) on March 29, 2019; Committee consideration by House Committee on Ways and Means; passed committee on April 2, 2019, as "SECURE Act", Passed the House of Representatives on May 23, 2019 (417–3); Passed the House of Representatives on December 17, 2019 (297–120) with amendment; Senate agreed to House of Representatives amendment on December 19, 2019 (71–23); Signed into law by President Donald Trump on December 20, 2019

The Setting Every Community Up for Retirement Enhancement (SECURE) Act of 2019, Pub. L. 116–94 (text) (PDF), was signed into law by President Donald Trump on December 20, 2019 as part of the Further Consolidated Appropriations Act, 2020 (2020 United States federal budget).

The SECURE Act changed the most popular retirement plans used in the United States and was the first major retirement-related legislation enacted since the 2006 Pension Protection Act. Major elements of the bill include: raising the minimum age for required minimum distributions from 70.5 years of age to 72 years of age; allowing workers to contribute to traditional IRAs after turning 70.5 years of age; allowing individuals to use 529 plan money to repay student loans; eliminating the so-called stretch IRA by requiring non-spouse beneficiaries of inherited IRAs to withdraw and pay taxes on all distributions from inherited accounts within 10 years; and making it easier for 401(k) plan administrators to offer annuities. The act was followed by the SECURE 2.0 Act.

== Legislative history ==
Richard Neal, the U.S. representative for Massachusetts's 1st congressional district and chairman of the House Ways and Means Committee, introduced the SECURE Act as H.R. 1994 on March 29, 2019. The bipartisan bill was co-introduced by Ranking Member Kevin Brady (R-TX) as well as Reps. Ron Kind (D-WI) and Mike Kelly (R-PA). It passed the House Ways and Means Committee on April 2, 2019 and passed the full House on May 23, 2019 by a vote of 417–3.

In the Senate, a companion bill called the Retirement Enhancement and Savings Act (RESA, S. 972) was introduced by Senator Chuck Grassley (R-Iowa), chairman of the Senate Finance Committee. This bill, co-sponsored by Ranking Member Ron Wyden (D-OR), failed to advance in committee.

Elements of both bills were incorporated into the fiscal year 2020 spending bill (H R. 1865). The SECURE Act, as part of the spending bill, was passed by the House on December 17, 2019 by a vote of 297–120 and by the Senate on December 19, 2019 by a vote of 71–23. It was signed into law by President Donald Trump on December 20, 2019.

== Provisions ==
The SECURE Act was drafted to assist in saving and investing for retirement. To that end, it contains a number of provisions to incentivize retirement planning, diversify the options available to savers, and increase access to tax-advantaged savings programs.

=== Defined-contribution plan changes ===
==== For employers ====
The SECURE Act incentivizes employers to create 401(k) plans and to expand access to their existing plans to more workers. One provision allows unrelated small employers to join together to establish a shared 401(k) plan known as a Multiple Employer Plan (MEP). This allows small businesses to pool resources and mitigate the administrative expenses of establishing a plan. MEPs existed prior to the SECURE Act, but under the previous law they were required to be related in some way (e.g. through geography or through membership in a common industry or trade association). The SECURE Act waived this requirement for MEPs.

The law also shields employers who join a Multiple Employer Plan from liability for potential misconduct perpetrated by other employers who are in the same plan. In addition, the federal tax credit for defraying plan startup costs is increased from $500 to up to $5,000, and provides an additional $500 tax credit for plans that automatically enroll new hires. Another provision requires employers to cover long-term, part-time workers starting in 2021. "Long-term, part-time" workers are defined as workers at least 21 years of age who have completed at least 500 hours of service each year for 3 consecutive years.

Employers who offer annuities as part of their defined-contribution retirement plans are shielded from liability under a new safe-harbor provision even if the insurance company selling the annuity commits fraud or collapses, as long as they meet specific regulatory requirements.

The law also provides a maximum tax credit of $500 per year to small employers who create a 401(k) or SIMPLE IRA plan with automatic enrollment. If a multiple employer plan is set up with automatic enrollment, each eligible employer participating in the plan may claim a separate tax credit. For this tax credit, an employer is eligible if it had no more than 100 employees who received at least $5,000 of compensation from the employer in the preceding year.

==== For employees ====
Participants in 401(k) and other defined-contribution plans (including traditional IRAs) can delay taking required minimum distributions until they reach the age of 72, an increase from the current age of 70.5. Participants are also permitted to continue contributing to traditional IRAs even after turning 70.5, which was previously prohibited. The SECURE Act also permits graduate students to treat stipends and non-tuition fellowship payments as compensation for the purposes of contributing to IRAs.

Under the SECURE Act, parents can withdraw up to $5,000 from their individual 401(k) or similar workplace retirement savings plans for each new child within one year of the birth or adoption of the child, without incurring the 10% additional penalty tax for taking an early distribution.

Employees who purchase an annuity in their 401(k) can move their annuity to another 401(k) plan at a different employer or to an IRA without paying surrender charges or other penalty fees.

=== 529 plan changes ===
The SECURE Act allows people saving money in a tax-advantaged 529 plan to use up to $10,000 to pay off student loans.

529 plans can now also be used to pay for the fees, books, supplies, and equipment for apprenticeship programs. In order to be eligible, the apprenticeship program must be registered with and certified by the U.S. Department of Labor under section 1 of the National Apprenticeship Act.

=== Tax changes ===
The SECURE Act partly revises the 2017 Tax Cuts and Jobs Act (TCJA), repealing certain "kiddie tax" provisions that increased taxes on the benefits received by family members of deceased United States military veterans and graduate students.

=== Funding ===
The SECURE Act is estimated to cost $15.7 billion. It is primarily funded through a change to "stretch" IRAs. In the past, non-spouse beneficiaries who inherit IRAs could spread disbursements from the IRA over their lifetime. Under the SECURE Act, disbursements must be collected and taxed within 10 years of the original account holder's death. This provision shortens the time period in which tax-advantaged accounts can grow and will increase the taxable income of beneficiaries during that ten-year period, generating tax revenue to fund the cost of the law.

== Analysis and reaction ==
=== Support ===
The SECURE Act received support from a variety of special interest and consumer advocacy groups, including the Society for Human Resource Management and the AARP. The CEO of AARP, Jo Ann Jenkins, praised the bill, citing provisions that she claimed would reduce poverty risk among retirees and improve the nation's financial security.

It also received support from financial advisory firms such as Northwestern Mutual and T. Rowe Price, who praised the bill for expanding options for retirement saving and for making it easier for workers to participate in employer savings plans.

Though the proposal to limit "stretch IRAs" was controversial, it has received support from some commentators who argue that it is a good source of revenue and will help reduce intergenerational inequality by ensuring that IRAs are used for their intended purpose of saving for retirement.

=== Criticism ===
Some critics have expressed concern about the provision making it easier for 401(k) plan administrators to offer annuities, describing it as a "cave-in to the insurance lobby". David Moon, a columnist with the Knoxville News Sentinel, criticized the provision because it prohibited employees from suing employers if the 401k provider went out of business or defrauded the employees, and stated that it improperly exposed the least sophisticated investors to the most expensive and complex financial products. He also criticized a requirement in the SECURE Act which required 401k plan administrators to send annual income disclosures to plan participants, showing the amount of monthly income they would receive if their plan funds were converted into an annuity, something that he characterized as an "annuity advertisement".

Advocates of the so-called stretch IRAs have also criticized the provision that required beneficiaries of inherited IRAs to draw down (and pay taxes on) those inherited IRAs within 10 years. Jon Ham, an adviser at the New England Investment and Retirement Group, argued that this provision undermines the purpose of the SECURE Act by requiring people to draw down retirement accounts over 10 years rather than over the course of their lifetime, hurting their long-term financial planning.

Ed Slott, a leading financial planner and IRA specialist, wrote that the provision would not generate as much revenue as Congress hoped. He argued that the provision would discourage Americans from performing Roth conversions, which generate revenues. He also argued that eliminating stretch IRAs would encourage people to withdraw money from IRAs and into more lucrative tax-free investment vehicles such as life insurance. Others such as Denise Appleby and Bruce Steiner contend that the SECURE Act will encourage more IRA owners to do Roth conversions now that many beneficiaries will be in higher tax brackets as a result of bunching the distributions into fewer years.

The Joint Congressional Committee on Taxation released a report suggesting that the SECURE Act's impact on retirement savings would be relatively modest. Aron Szapiro, a policy research director at Morningstar, argued that the types of tax incentives used by the SECURE Act to encourage retirement savings would not motivate major changes in savings rate. An analyst from the Brookings Institution noted as well that the provisions for multiple-employer plans, while significant, would not have a major impact on small employers.
