= Crummey trust =

Trust type in the United States

In the United States, a Crummey trust is a trust for the benefit of individuals into which gifts are made in a manner qualifying them for exclusion from the unified gift and estate tax. The trust is named for the first person to use such a structure, D. Clifford Crummey.

== Overview ==
Normally, gifts to minors are subject to parental / guardian control until the age of majority. In order to delay the transfer of control beyond the age of 18, the funds must be placed in trust. However, the annual gift exclusion from the gift tax ($19,000 per individual and $38,000 per married couple as of 2026) is available only for gifts of so-called present interests. Normally, a gift into a trust that comes under control of the beneficiary at a future date does not constitute a present interest.

A Crummey trust achieves an effect desired by some creators of such trusts by offering the recipient a window of time to take immediate control of the gift (often 30 days). The control offered applies only to the current gift - typically, an amount no greater than the annual exclusion amount - not the entire trust. If the recipient fails to exercise the right to withdraw from the trust during that window, the gift becomes part of the trust and is thereafter subject to the trust's distribution conditions. However, since the recipient had the opportunity to receive the funds outside of the trust in a given tax year, the gift is deemed to be a present interest, allowing it to be subject to the annual gift exclusion.

The expectation of future annual gifts under the same mechanism (or the expectation of the withholding of such future gifts if the recipient exerts control over the gift) may motivate the recipient to relinquish control of the funds into the trust. Some trusts may even explicitly state that exercise of the withdrawal provision will lead to "no further financial gifts [being] made" to the trust in future years.

A Crummey trust is also referred to as a Crummey provision or a Crummey power. A Crummey provision can be contained within another type of trust. Some life insurance trusts will have a Crummey provision. A Crummey provision is typically a provision within another trust and ordinarily works as follows. The grantor makes a gift to an irrevocable living trust. The trust beneficiaries are notified by the trustee that they have the power to withdraw some or all of the gift to the trust for a specified time period. The simultaneous acts of the grantor transferring property to the trust and the trust beneficiaries being permitted to withdraw the gift from the trust is deemed to be the same as giving the gift to the beneficiaries outright. The gift to the trust with the Crummey provision now qualifies for the annual gift exclusion.

The Crummey Trust is named after D. Clifford Crummey, who first came up with the concept in the 1960s. The U.S. Tax Court found this action legal in 1968, and the nickname "Crummey Power" stuck. See Crummey et al. v. Commissioner of Internal Revenue, 397 F.2d 82, (9th Cir.1968).

== See also ==
- Rabbi trust
