= Texas Tomorrow Fund =

The Texas Tomorrow Fund is a prepaid college investment program operating in Texas.

There are two plans:

- The Texas Guaranteed Tuition Plan (TGTP)
- The Texas College Savings Plan (formerly the Tomorrow's College Investment Plan).

The former, TheTexas Guaranteed Tuition Plan, is a constitutionally guaranteed plan administered by the Texas Prepaid Higher Education Tuition Board, that allows individuals to select contracts for junior colleges, public universities and private colleges and universities. The Texas Tomorrow Fund was created in 1995 to allow families to prepay for future college tuition at current prices. In 1997, Texas voters passed a constitutional amendment (Article VII, Section 19) that guaranteed the financial backing of the plan, making it one of the few prepaid tuition programs in the nation with such a strong legal guarantee. The latter, the Texas College Savings Plan, is a qualified 529 college savings and investment plan offered through the state and managed by NorthStar Financial Services Group, LLC.

The Texas College Savings Plan is not backed directly by the state; However, Texas voters approved a constitutional amendment in 1997 that guarantees the plan’s benefits with the full faith and credit of the state.

In 2003, the 78th Legislature passed House Bill (HB) 3015, amending Texas Education Code §54.0513 to allow governing boards of public universities to set different designated tuition rates, rather than being forced to charge what the State thought was appropriate. The State's guaranteed tuition plan was in jeopardy, for the State could not effectively predict how expensive tuition was going to be a decade from now and, consequently, could not accurately peg charges for applicants. New enrollment in the Texas Guaranteed Tuition Plan was then closed. The closure was directly tied to tuition deregulation in 2003, when House Bill 3015 allowed individual universities to set their own tuition rates. This change led to rapid tuition increases that far outpaced the assumptions built into the fund’s pricing model, leaving it financially unsustainable. Because the plan was constitutionally guaranteed, the state became liable for the shortfall between tuition payments and actual tuition costs.

As an example of how much non-regulated tuition has cost the Texas Tomorrow Fund, according to the Texas Higher Education Coordinating Board, the ‘total tuition’ at UT Austin in Fall of 2003 was $1,380 by Fall of 2015 it had risen to $3,391. That’s a $2,011 change with a percentage change of 146%.

== Texas Tomorrow Fund in the Texas Constitution ==
Located in Article 7, Section 19 of the Texas Constitution, the Texas Tomorrow Fund was added November 4, 1997, for the purpose of higher education in Texas.

The Section is as follows,

"(a) The Texas tomorrow fund is created as a trust fund dedicated to the prepayment of tuition and fees for higher education as provided by the general laws of this state for the prepaid higher education tuition program. The assets of the fund are held in trust for the benefit of participants and beneficiaries and may not be diverted. The state shall hold the assets of the fund for the exclusive purposes of providing benefits to participants and beneficiaries and defraying reasonable expenses of administering the program.

(b) Financing of benefits must be based on sound actuarial principles. The amount contributed by a person participating in the prepaid higher education program shall be as provided by the general laws of this state, but may not be less than the amount anticipated for tuition and required fees based on sound actuarial principles. If in any fiscal year there is not enough money in the Texas tomorrow fund to pay the tuition and required fees of an institution of higher education in which a beneficiary enrolls or the appropriate portion of the tuition and required fees of a private or independent institution of higher education in which a beneficiary enrolls as provided by a prepaid tuition contract, there is appropriated out of the first money coming into the state treasury in each fiscal year not otherwise appropriated by the constitution the amount that is sufficient to pay the applicable amount of tuition and required fees of the institution.

(c) Assets of the fund may be invested by an entity designated by general law in securities considered prudent investments. Investments shall be made in the exercise of judgment and care under the circumstances that a person of ordinary prudence, discretion, and intelligence exercises in the management of the person's affairs, not for speculation, but for the permanent disposition of funds, considering the probable income from the disposition as well as the probable safety of capital.

(d) The state comptroller of public accounts shall take the actions necessary to implement this section.

(e) To the extent this section conflicts with any other provision of this constitution, this section controls."

== Fund in debt ==
The 78th Legislature passed House Bill (HB) 3015 mentioned earlier, contributed to a rise in the costs of state tuition as tuition deregulation became effective September 1, 2003, and universities began increasing designated tuition in spring 2004. Due to this, the program stopped accepting new participants.

In an article by the Texas Tribune from January 7, 2019, it stated the Texas Tomorrow Fund has an estimated liability fund of $613 million and will be short on funds as soon as 2020. (UT Austin tuition was $7,630 per year in 2007; the state had projected $5,332.) This gap is currently paid by the University out of tuition from non-Tomorrow Fund students and, as more students enroll using the Fund, universities must raise tuition to balance out the lack of income from Tomorrow Fund students. The International Office handles Texas Tomorrow Funds/Texas Guaranteed Tuition Plan requests only for students attending study abroad programs where they are not paying UT tuition rates.

== Restarting the program ==
Most states that close their prepaid tuition plans now administer other education savings plans instead. In Texas, the TGTP was replaced by a new prepaid plan in 2008. The Texas Tuition Promise Fund was introduced in 2008 as a replacement for the Texas Tomorrow Fund. Unlike its predecessor, the Promise Fund is not backed by the full faith and credit of the state. Instead, it offers a tiered pricing system based on the type of college a student plans to attend. While this structure increases flexibility, it does not provide the same guaranteed financial coverage as the original plan.

Under this program there are three categories from which parents will be able to buy semester hours in units (a unit represents 1% of a year's tuition, based on two semesters of 15 credit-hours each), with prices based on the type of college the student plans to attend.

== What Types of Tuition Credit Units are Available, and How Do They Differ? ==
Under this program, there are three categories that provide tuition coverage on a tier-based system. From one of these three categories, parents will be able to buy semester hours in units (a unit represents 1% of a year's tuition, based on two semesters of 15 credit-hours each), with prices based on the type of college the student plans to attend:

- Type 1: The most expensive, will cover your tuition cost dollar-for-dollar at any flagship, public Texas university or college.
- Type 2: Less expensive than type 1, will cover tuition up to the weighted average cost of all Texas public universities and colleges. This means that if the school your child will be attending costs more than the state average, you will have to cover the difference (either with extra units or with money from other sources). This will ensure that the new program will not experience the shortfall issues that the previous program dealt with. If your child’s tuition is at or below the weighted-average, the entirety of the tuition will be covered using the credits.
- Type 3: The least expensive credit, works the same way as Type 2. However, it is only meant to be used for two-year Texas public universities and colleges.

If the student enrolls in a college more expensive than the weighted average for their level of plan, they will have to pay the difference (either with extra units or with money from other sources), ensuring that this program should not experience the shortfall problems of the previous program.

== Substantial program changes ==
On August 24, 2009, the Texas Prepaid Higher Education Tuition Board published a substantial change to the contract terms of the program. Previously, when contracts were canceled, participants were refunded the current value of tuition and fees at the time of cancellation. As of November 1, 2009 participants will only be refunded the amount of their contributions minus any applicable account fees.

On September 24, 2009, the Tuition Board published an amendment to the change a month earlier. The deadline for refunds was extended until November 30, 2009. Participants cancel matured contracts will receive a refund based upon their contributions plus earnings, minus applicable fees. Participants who cancel contracts that were not matured will receive the lump sum actuarial value of the contract, minus fees.

On November 6, 2009, the Tuition Board published a partial policy reversal to the previous amendment, pending an approval vote by the Board on December 23, 2009. Those who have withdrawn funds based upon the previous rule change in September may rescind their cancellation by December 31, 2009. Those who choose to opt out of the plan (and receive either actual tuition-based earnings or lump sum actuarial value) may do so through January 31, 2010.

== See also ==
- Guaranteed Education Tuition Program, a similar program in Washington state
