= Guaranteed Education Tuition Program =

The GET Prepaid Tuition Plan, is one of two 529 college savings plans administered by Washington Education Savings Plans (WA529). WA529 is part of Washington Student Achievement Council, an agency of the U.S. state of Washington for residents of the state. GET is a 529 prepaid tuition savings plan, while Washington's other plan, WA529 Invest, is a 529 college investment plan. As with any 529 plan, account owners invest in the program on behalf of a beneficiary – typically the owner's child or grandchild – in order to prepay for expenses associated with the beneficiary attending a higher education institution.

== Overview ==
The GET Plan is a prepaid 529 plan, and accounts may only be opened by, or on behalf of, residents of the state of Washington. The value of an account is dictated by the quantity of "units" purchased. Units have a purchase value and a payout value which are subject to increase yearly. The U.S. dollar payout value of one unit is always equal to one percent of the annual full-time, undergraduate, in-state tuition and state-mandated fees at the most expensive public university in the state – either the University of Washington or Washington State University. The unit purchase price and payout value are determined annually and are available on the GET Plan's Price and Payout page. This premium over current tuition provides financial stability for the program at the expense of program participant returns, since tuition is guaranteed in the future, regardless of how much it increases. Current estimates project that GET units should be held for several years to see financial gain, versus other investment options which may provide immediate return. GET is aggressively marketed as a long-term program for families with young children.

Use of the funds invested in GET are restricted to tuition and other expenses associated with higher education (known as "qualified higher education expenses," e.g., room and board, books and supplies, mandatory fees, laptops and computer software). Units purchased must be retained for a minimum of two years before they can be used. Investments are not tax-deductible; however, the increase in account value over time, as well as disbursements to pay for higher-education expenses, are both tax-free. Disbursements for purposes other than to pay for higher-education expenses are subject to income taxes and/or penalties imposed by both the program and the Internal Revenue Service; exceptions are made for certain circumstances such as the death of the beneficiary or the beneficiary receiving a scholarship, in which case income tax is still imposed but penalties are not.

Accounts may only be opened by, or on behalf of, Washington residents; however, disbursements from the program may be made to any higher education institution in the United States, as well as some foreign institutions, that participate in financial aid programs through the United States Department of Education. Accounts have the same monetary value wherever they are used. Accounts are fully transferable to other relatives of the initial beneficiary. Contributions may be made in lump sum or regular payments may be made on a custom monthly plan. The Account Owner retains full control of the account.

Investments in the program are backed by Washington State; i.e., the state assumes all investment risk and guarantees that returns on investments will keep pace with inflation and increases in college tuition over time. The program currently does not receive any appropriations from the state; however, per state law RCW 28B.95.050, the state is required to provide funding in the event that the program's available funds are insufficient to cover its payout obligations.

== Unit Pricing ==
For 2025-26, the unit price is $123.76 and payout value is $127.85. For 2022-2023, the unit price and payout value are $116.63.

== See also ==
- Texas Tomorrow Fund, a similar program in the U.S. state of Texas
