= 401(a) =

Tax-deferred retirement savings plan

In the United States, a 401(a) plan is a tax-deferred retirement savings plan defined by subsection 401(a) of the Internal Revenue Code. The 401(a) plan is established by an employer, and allows for contributions by the employer or both employer and employee. Contribution amounts, whether dollar-based or percentage-based, eligibility, and vesting schedule are all determined by the sponsoring employer.

These plans are available to some employees of the government, educational institutions, and non-profits, and their funds can be rolled over to a different qualified retirement plan, such as a 401(k) or IRA, when changing jobs. Employer contributions are mandatory, while employees are not necessarily required to contribute to the plan. Early withdrawals from the plan are permitted, but they may be subject to a penalty.

== See also ==
- 401(k)
- 403(b)
- 457(b) and 457(f) plans
- Individual retirement account
- List of finance topics
- Taxation in the United States
- Thrift Savings Plan
