= Special needs trust =

Financial trust to benefit disabled individuals

A special needs trust, also known in some jurisdictions as a supplemental needs trust, is a specialized trust that allows the disabled beneficiary to enjoy the use of property that is held in the trust for their benefit, while at the same time allowing the beneficiary to receive essential needs-based government benefits. A Special Needs Trust is a specific type of irrevocable trust that exists under Common Law. Several Common Law nations have established specific statutes relative to the creation and use of Special Needs Trusts, and where they exist a Special Needs Trust will not be valid unless it comports with the requirements listed in the statute. The applicable Federal statute in the United States is found at Title 42 United States Code Section 1396p(d)(4)(A). Several States have established their own statutes.

Generally, irrevocable trusts can be used for minors, beneficiaries with physical or mental challenges, and as a method of asset protection. In addition to the public benefits preservation reasons for such a trust, there are administrative advantages of using a trust to hold and manage property intended for the benefit of the beneficiary, especially if the beneficiary lacks the legal capacity to handle their own financial affairs. Special needs trusts may also be useful for people who are planning for possible future disability.

== Throughout the world ==
A trust for a beneficiary with disability may be set up in any of the common law countries, including the United States, and also in other countries that recognize the concept of a "trust." In such jurisdictions, there is often legislation that provides advantages to such trusts in the areas of taxation and state benefits, e.g., in Ireland and the United Kingdom. In the United States of America, such trusts provide advantages in helping beneficiaries qualify for health care coverage under state Medicaid programs, and also for monthly cash payments under the Supplemental Security Income (SSI) program operated by the Social Security Administration.

== Overview ==
Special needs trusts can provide benefits to, and protect the assets of, minors and the physically challenged or the mentally challenged. Special needs trusts are frequently used to receive an inheritance or personal injury settlement proceeds on behalf of a minor or a person with disability, or are founded from the proceeds of compensation for criminal injuries, litigation or insurance settlements.

A common feature of trusts in all common law jurisdictions is that they may be run either by family members (a private trust) or by trustees appointed by the court. Especially where a trust is to be established for a child or young person with disability, great care is generally taken in the choice of appropriate trustees to manage the trust assets and to deal with future replacement appointments. The use of a private discretionary trust can not only be more efficient in terms of taxation and access to government benefits but can also allow for more efficient investment of funds held than where funds are held by a court official (such as the Official Receiver in England and Wales). However where no appropriate trustees can be found, e.g. on the death of existing trustees, the court will intervene.

Special needs trusts are often set up under the guidance of a structured settlement planner in cooperation with a qualified legal and financial team to ensure the trust is set up correctly. Only authorized non-profit organizations are approved to manage a special needs trust program. Such pooled trusts are available throughout the United States and are often centered on certain purposes (often disabilities).
