= Nonqualified deferred compensation =

In the United States, the question whether any compensation plan is qualified or non-qualified is primarily a question of taxation under the Internal Revenue Code (IRC). Any business prefers to deduct its expenses from its income, which will reduce the income subject to taxation. Expenses which are deductible ("qualified") have satisfied tests required by the IRC. Expenses which do not satisfy those tests ("non-qualified") are not deductible; even though the business has incurred the expense, the amount of that expenditure remains as part of taxable income. In most situations, any business will attempt to satisfy the requirements so that its expenditures are deductible business expenses.

A non-qualified deferred compensation plan or agreement simply defers the payment of a portion of the employee's compensation to a future date. The amounts are held back (deferred) while the employee is working for the company, and are paid out to the employee when he or she separates from service, becomes disabled, dies, etc. As will be discussed later, one of the keys in designing a non-qualified deferred compensation plan is making sure that the employee will not be required to pay income tax on those deferred amounts until the amounts are actually paid to the employee.

== Basics ==
In describing a "non-qualified deferred compensation plan", we can consider each word.

- Non-qualified: a "non-qualified" plan does not meet all of the technical requirements imposed on "qualified plans" (like pension and profit-sharing plans) under the IRC or the Employee Retirement Income Security Act (ERISA). However, they are required to meet the requirements of IRC § 409A.
- Deferred: the employee's receipt of compensation is delayed until a future date (such as upon attaining normal retirement age).
- Compensation: the employee can defer regular salary, bonuses or any other type of compensation. Employees who are very high in the corporate hierarchy may receive additional (or supplemental) compensation provided by the employer to fund the arrangement.
- Plan: a non-qualified deferred compensation plan can be established for one individual (for example, an agreement for one employee), or can be established for a large number of individuals selected in the complete discretion of the company (for example, a "plan" for all the highly paid employees of the company). A non-qualified deferred compensation arrangement also can be established for an independent contractor, including directors.

== Types of plans ==
There are two general types of unfunded deferred compensation plans:

Elective deferral plans
Under an elective deferral plan, the employee elects to defer a portion of compensation, which he or she would otherwise receive currently. The election is contained in a written agreement that specifies the amount of salary, bonus, commissions or other deferrals and the time and manner of payment, such as retirement.
Supplemental benefit plans
Under a supplemental benefit plan, the employer makes a legally binding agreement to pay "supplemental" compensation (compensation in addition to regular salary and bonus), typically upon retirement. These plans are often called Supplemental Executive Retirement Plans (SERP). SERPs are frequently designed as defined benefit pension plans, either as a stand-alone plan or paired with a qualified pension plan.

== Flexible benefit structure ==
Deferred compensation plans offer flexibility for both the employer and the employee.

=== Deferred amounts credited to a book account ===
Unfunded deferred compensation plans offer very flexible benefit structures compared to qualified retirement plans, even after the enactment of new Internal Revenue Code IRC §409A (discussed below).

Account-based plans: Elective deferrals are credited to an account in the participant's name along with any company contributions (such as matching contributions). Earnings may be credited to the plan with interest at a set rate or flexible rate, or treated as if the deferred amounts were invested in specific investments designated by the employee.

Non-account plans (defined benefit plans): The benefit amount may also be a specified dollar amount payable annually after retirement or termination. Payments continue as specified in the plan, usually over the life of the employee or the joint lives of the employee and the employee's spouse.

=== Timing of deferral elections ===
Generally, deferral elections are required to be on file with the employer before the employee has a "legally binding right" to the compensation.

Election filed prior to the calendar year salary, commission and some bonuses are earned.

Later elections for certain types of contingent compensation ("performance-based" pay earned over 12 months or more, rights subject to forfeiture, etc.) Sign-on, retention, spot bonus, project bonus, severance at the time the compensation is awarded or negotiated.

== Unfunded plan ==
With unfunded deferred compensation plans, the employer may purchase insurance to help satisfy its obligations under the plan, but the nonqualified deferred compensation plan should not tie the amount of benefits directly to the amounts payable under the life insurance policy. Note that the employee should have only the rights of an unsecured general creditor.

== Forfeiture of benefits ==
Some common provisions relating to forfeiture of benefits in unfunded deferred compensation plans include:

- Termination of employment prior to a specified vesting date, if the plan contains vesting provisions.
- If employee terminates prior to attaining normal retirement age, death, or disability.
- If employee terminates and enters into competition with the employer.
- If employee is terminated for "cause."

Forfeiture provisions usually will be included only if the amounts deferred are supplemental benefits provided by the employer; normally the employee would not voluntarily defer current compensation if there is risk that he or she will forfeit those amounts (however, as discussed below, deferral plans for tax-exempt organizations often must include forfeiture provisions).

== Income tax consequences for employees ==
If the plan is designed properly, compensation will not be included in the employee's taxable income until paid under the terms of the plan. Four rules must be considered—the constructive receipt doctrine, the economic benefit doctrine, IRC §83, and IRC §409A.

State income taxation, as well as employment taxation (FICA and FUTA), may differ in their timing from federal income taxation.

=== Constructive receipt doctrine does not require immediate taxation ===
Although individuals (as cash-basis taxpayers) normally include amounts in taxable income only when the amount is actually received, under the "constructive receipt doctrine", the individual is taxed on the amount when it is made available to him or her so that he or she may draw upon it at any time. For example, if an individual receives a check for services performed in 2008, he or she cannot simply hold the check and then cash it in 2009 and defer the tax on the amount from 2008 to 2009. The applicable Treasury Regulations provide that an amount is not constructively received if "the taxpayer's control of its receipt is subject to substantial limitations or restrictions". Whether a taxpayer has constructively received an amount depends on the facts and circumstances of the particular case. The constructive receipt doctrine does not require immediate taxation when the nonqualified deferred compensation arrangement is properly structured.

In a nonqualified deferred compensation arrangement, the employee receives no present benefit. The employee is only an unsecured creditor.

The benefits are includible in taxable income when they are paid or made available, whichever is earlier.

=== Economic benefit doctrine does not require immediate taxation ===
Under the "economic benefit" doctrine, an employee will be taxed on certain rights if the employee enjoys the economic benefits from those rights. Under this doctrine, benefits are included in gross income when assets are unconditionally and irrevocably transferred into a fund for the employee's sole benefit and the employee has a nonforfeitable vested interest. In Minor v. United States, 772 F.2d 1472 (9th Cir. 1985), the court stated that "the economic benefit doctrine is applicable only if the employer's promise is capable of valuation", and "a current economic benefit is capable of valuation where the employer makes a contribution to an employee's deferred compensation plan which is (i) nonforfeitable, (ii) fully vested in the employee, and (iii) secured against the employer's creditors by a trust arrangement". Since the employee's rights will not be "secured against the employer's creditors", the economic benefit doctrine should not trigger immediate taxation upon the creation of the NQDC plan.

=== IRC §83 does not require immediate taxation ===
Section 83 does not require immediate taxation but includes in income the value of "property" transferred to an employee or independent contractor in exchange for services rendered, when the property becomes transferable or is no longer subject to a substantial risk of forfeiture, whichever occurs earlier. For purposes of § 83, an unfunded and unsecured promise to pay money or property in the future is not "property". Thus, as long as the employer's promise under the plan is "unfunded and unsecured", Section 83 will not apply and will not cause taxation before the benefit is paid. The benefits under a non-qualified deferred compensation plan are considered to be "unfunded" as long as the employee has no rights in any specific assets of the employer, the deferred amounts are subject to the claims of the employer's general creditors, and the employee has no power to assign his or her rights. The benefits are "unsecured" as long as the employee is considered merely a general creditor of the company.

=== New IRC §409A does not require immediate taxation ===
Plans that are documented and administered according to the requirements under IRC §409A will not cause deferrals to be immediately taxed. Although the final regulations under IRC §409A are lengthy, the basic components of an IRC §409A-compliant plan are:

- Written plan document
- Written deferral agreements that specify the amount deferred, and the time or event when payment will be made
- Timely execution and acceptance by the employer of the deferral agreement under the applicable election timing rules
- Payment in accordance with the objective terms and conditions of the plan and payment election

=== State tax laws may or may not require immediate taxation ===
State tax laws generally follow federal law as to the timing of income inclusion, but may also deviate from federal laws.

=== FICA and FUTA taxes do not require immediate taxation – but there is different timing ===
Amounts are subject to Federal Insurance Contributions Act tax (FICA) and Federal Unemployment Tax Act tax (FUTA) at the later of (i) when the services are rendered or (ii) when the compensation is no longer subject to a substantial risk of forfeiture.

Often, the employee already has income above the wage base ($127,200 in 2017) for purpose of the Old Age, Survivors, Disability Insurance (OASDI) portion of the FICA tax, and won't owe the OASDI portion of the tax. However, the deferred compensation will be still subject to the hospital insurance portion of the FICA tax (referred to as the "HI" portion, or "Medicare tax") because the hospital insurance wage base is currently unlimited. The employee portion of the Medicare tax is 1.45% of wages (and an extra 0.9% for high-earners).

== Tax consequences for employers ==
The employer cannot claim a deduction until the benefits are taxable to the employee.

== ERISA considerations ==
An unfunded plan is exempt from a majority of the provisions of ERISA as long as it constitutes a "Top Hat" plan.

=== Unfunded plans ===
A Top Hat plan is an unfunded plan maintained by the employer to provide deferred compensation to a select group of management or highly compensated employees. If coverage extends beyond this group then the plan is not a Top Hat plan.

A plan with insurance contracts in which the premiums are paid by the employer is considered unfunded.

In Miller v. Heller, 915 F.Supp. 651 (S.D.N.Y. 1996), the court held that the deferred compensation plan was unfunded although the employer would pay the benefits from amounts received under a life insurance policy subject to a split-dollar plan.

Department of Labor (DOL) Advisory Opinion 81-11A provides that a deferred compensation plan internally financed with life insurance generally will be treated as unfunded if the following criteria are satisfied:

- the insurance proceeds are payable only to the employer, which is the named beneficiary;
- the employer has all rights of ownership under the policies and the policies are subject to the claims of the employer's creditors;
- neither the plan nor any participant or beneficiary has any preferred claim against the policies or any beneficial ownership in the policies;
- no representations are made to any participant or beneficiary that the policies will be used exclusively to provide plan benefits or are security for the payment of benefits;
- plan benefits are not limited or governed in any way by the amount of insurance proceeds received by the employer; and
- employee contributions are neither required nor permitted.

=== Belka v. Rowe Furniture Corp. ===
571 F. Supp. 1249 (D. Md. 1983), found that between 1.6% and 4.6% of the employees were covered by the plan and thus were a "top hat" group. In Duggan v. Hobbs, 99 F.3d 307 (9th Cir. 1996), the court concluded that a plan which covered one of the company's twenty-three employees qualified as a "top hat" plan.

However, no regulations explain what constitutes a top hat group. Some DOL advisory opinion letters have covered this issue. Letter 85-37A found that a plan was not a top hat plan even though only 50 of the highly compensated employees out of 750 employees were covered by the plan. In ruling, the DOL found that a broad range of salaries and positions were covered by the plan and thus concluded that it was not a top hat plan.

A plan that covers too large a percentage of the employer's work force will not benefit a "select group."

Significant Development in Demery v. Extebank Deferred Compensation Plan (B), 216 F.3d 283 (2d Cir. 2000), the Second Circuit concluded that a plan could still qualify as a "top hat" plan even though (i) more than 15% of the employees were eligible to participate, and (ii) two or three of the participants were neither highly compensated nor management employees. Thus, while the old rule of thumb was 5% (based on Belka); Extebank appears to allow for up to 15% eligibility.

The Second Circuit determined that the term "primarily" applies to both benefits and participants. Small number of participants who don't meet Top Hat definition will not taint the plan.

Court considered qualitative factors in determining a Top Hat Group:

- Ability to influence plan.
- Quality of plan benefits.
- Supplement to existing plan.
- Purpose of plan.

Court considered quantitative factors:

- Calculation of Select Group Fraction – number of eligible divided by workforce. Extebank found 15.34% is ". . . near [the] upper limit."
- But see how the Second Circuit in Gallione v. Flaherty 70 F. 3d 724 (1995) increased the size of the group but reduced its percentage by utilizing a large workforce.

Another Case: Gallione v. Flaherty, 70 F.3d 724. Court refers to number of members in the union when considering plan established for union management.

There does not appear to be an adoption by the DOL of the "highly compensated employee" definition found at IRC § 414(q).

DOL Advisory Opinion 90-14A. The DOL has, however, indicated that a "top hat" group consists of those individuals who have the ability to affect or substantially influence the design and operation of the deferred compensation plan. DOL Advisory Opinion 90-14A (May 8, 1990).

No DOL Regulations. Top Hat regulations are apparently not a priority with the DOL. DOL has announced that it is discontinuing its efforts to develop regulations. The announcement does not indicate whether the regulations project has been permanently withdrawn.

=== ERISA exemptions for Top Hat plans ===
Top Hat plans are exempt from the following ERISA provisions:

- Participation – ERISA Section 201(2).
- Vesting – ERISA Section 201(2).
- Benefit Accrual – ERISA Section 201(2).
- Minimum Funding – ERISA Section 301(a) (3).
- Fiduciary Requirements and Obligations – ERISA Section 401(a) (1).

=== ERISA requirements that apply to Top Hat plans ===
Top Hat plans must comply with the following ERISA provisions:

- Reporting and disclosure. ERISA Section 101. This is satisfied by filing with DOL a statement which includes (i) the employer's name, address, employer identification number, (ii) a statement that the plan is maintained primarily for the purpose of providing deferred compensation for a select group of management or highly compensated employees, and (iii) the number of plans and the number of employees in each plan. The employer can be required to provide documents to DOL if requested.
- Claims procedure under ERISA Section 503. "In addition, although the question is far from clear, the plan may be subject to the requirement of providing a claims procedure."

=== Unfunded excess benefit plans ===
An unfunded excess benefit plan is defined as a plan solely to provide benefits for certain employees and solely to provide benefits in excess of the limits under IRC § 415.

=== Employee-created plan ===
Also note that in certain situations, employee-created plans should avoid ERISA.
