= Supplemental needs trust =

Financial trust to benefit disabled individuals

Supplemental needs trust is a US-specific term for a type of special needs trust (an internationally recognized term). Supplemental needs trusts are compliant with provisions of US state and federal law and are designed to provide benefits to, and protect the assets of, individuals with physical, psychiatric, or intellectual disabilities, and still allow such persons to be qualified for and receive governmental health care benefits, especially long-term nursing care benefits, under the Medicaid welfare program.

Supplemental Needs Trusts are often used to receive an inheritance or personal injury litigation proceeds on behalf of an individual with a disability, in order to allow the person to qualify for Medicaid benefits despite their receipt of the settlement.

== Medicaid Law ==
Medicaid is the Federal program administered by the states which provides health care for those who cannot afford it, based primarily on a standard of impoverishment. See 42 U.S.C. § 1396 et. seq. Federal law establishes certain mandatory requirements which each state must adopt in its local Medicaid program. States are also given options to elect certain other components of the Medicaid program, which they then provide to qualified individuals. Accordingly, Medicaid coverage does vary from state to state in certain aspects, but there are also mandatory Federal law provisions.

To qualify for Medicaid and its long-term medical and nursing care benefits, the applicant must be "impoverished." There is a strict limit to the countable assets which a Medicaid recipient can own. To qualify for Medicaid, an applicant must meet the asset guidelines for Supplemental Security Income (SSI). SSI allows a single applicant to own no more than $2,000 in countable assets and a married applicant to own no more than $3,000 in countable assets. Certain assets, such as the home in which one is living, are specifically exempted and are not countable.

=== Trusts as Medicaid countable assets ===
A trust is a legal arrangement in which legal title to assets is held by a trustee under certain defined restrictions written within the governing instrument (usually a will or a written trust agreement) for the benefit of another party known as the beneficiary. Trusts can be used as a vehicle to make assets available to a beneficiary but still significantly restrict them. Such Trusts are called spendthrift trusts. A beneficiary does not necessarily have to be disabled to benefit from a spendthrift trust, but most spendthrift trusts would not suffice to qualify their beneficiary for Medicaid as the assets held within them would be countable.

Federal Medicaid law imposes significant requirements on the type of spendthrift trust which can be used to preserve assets of a beneficiary and still qualify the beneficiary for governmental benefits.

Prior to the enactment of the Omnibus Budget Reconciliation Act of 1993 (OBRA-93), P.L. 103–66, it was possible to create a self-settled, discretionary trust for the benefit of the settlor and still allow the settlor to qualify for Medicaid's long-term nursing care benefits. These trusts were called "Medicaid Qualifying Trusts" (MQT) and did not require an individual to be disabled to qualify for Medicaid, merely impoverished. The settlor of an MQT impoverished themselves simply by transferring their assets to the MQT, but they still had access to the use of such funds for their unrestricted, general support. Recognizing that numerous individuals who were otherwise solvent were qualifying for governmental benefits through the use of MQTs, Congress deemed MQTs to be abusive, and disallowed their use in 1992.

=== Medicaid exemptions ===
Congress recognized that disabled persons were a special class of individuals who benefited from the use of MQTs and thus permitted the establishment of supplemental needs trusts. A supplemental needs trust will be legally valid so long as the trust in question meets several preconditions as per Title 42 United States Code Section 1396p(d)(4)(A):

- It must be a spendthrift trust.
- It must be irrevocable.
- The beneficiary has to be a person who exhibits a significant impairment in areas of daily living.
- It has to be established prior to the beneficiary's 65th birthday.
- It has to function under its own Employer Identification Number (EIN).
- Until December 2016, it could only be established by a parent, grandparent, guardian, or court.
- It must contain required "Medicaid payback language" (whether repayment is applicable or not).

These trusts were called "special needs trusts" or "supplemental needs trusts" because the restrictive language in the trust agreement allowed the trustee to pay only for the needs of the beneficiary which the government did not pay. An SNT is not, like many other trusts, designed for the "support and maintenance" of the beneficiary; nor is the beneficiary allowed a yearly distribution of trust funds via a Crummey clause.

=== Medicaid Payback provision ===
The Medicaid Estate Recovery Program (MERP) mandates that states attempt to recover certain medical assistance costs paid through the Medicaid system from the estates of certain deceased beneficiaries. This requirement directly impacts the structure of certain first-party or self-settled Special Needs Trusts (SNTs). These trusts, established with the disabled beneficiary's own assets, must include a "payback provision" in compliance with federal law (specifically 42 U.S.C. § 1396p(d)(4)(A)). This provision stipulates that, upon the death of the disabled beneficiary, any remaining assets in the trust are subject to a lien by the state Medicaid agency up to the total amount of medical assistance paid on the beneficiary's behalf. While all first-party SNTs are federally mandated to contain a payback provision, the recovery of funds by the state is not always an automatic event upon the beneficiary's death. The state will actively engage the legal process to recoup its Medicaid expenditures. This is typically accomplished by the state Medicaid agency filing a formal claim or placing a lien against the deceased beneficiary's estate during probate. This legally secures the state's interest in the remaining trust assets and ensures that, within the limits of the law, public funds expended on the beneficiary's medical assistance are appropriately recovered.

Conversely, third-party SNTs, which are funded by the assets of individuals other than the beneficiary (e.g., parents or guardians), are generally not subject to the Medicaid payback requirement and do not need to include a payback clause.

== Types of supplemental needs trusts ==
=== First-party, self-settled supplemental needs trusts ===
A disabled beneficiary's own assets can form the corpus of a supplemental needs trust. Although an individual's assets are usually considered to be countable resources for purposes of qualification for Medicaid, the supplemental needs trust statute permits an individual to fund an SNT without being penalized.

Generally, divestment of assets for purposes of Medicaid qualification will trigger a 36-to-60 month "look back" by Medicaid, in which all asset transfers of the would-be beneficiary are examined. If found to be made specifically to qualify for Medicaid the transfer will be disallowed.

The special needs trust statute, however, allows a disabled beneficiary to divest themselves of assets for purposes of Medicaid qualification, provided that the assets are placed into the supplemental needs trust. Such assets would then form a "first party self-settled special needs trust" and would not trigger the "look back" provision. First-party assets can be added to subsequently if a trustee employs a specialized affidavit.

Until enactment of the "Special Needs Trust Fairness Act" provisions of the 21st Century Cures Act in late 2016, a first party/self-settled trust had to be created by a parent, grandparent, guardian, or court. The statute did not allow the disabled individual to create his or her own trust, even if he or she was otherwise legally competent. The 21st Century Cures Act amended 42 U.S.C. §1396p(d)(4)(A), by adding "the individual" to the list of people who can establish a first party trust.

=== Third-party supplemental needs trusts ===
A third-party special needs trust (SNT) is a specialized, non-self-settled trust designed to hold assets for the benefit of a disabled beneficiary, with funds originating solely from someone other than the beneficiary, such as parents or grandparents. This distinction in funding source ensures that the assets are generally disregarded by benefit agencies, thereby preserving the beneficiary's eligibility for means-tested government benefits (like SSI and Medicaid). While the SNT may technically be created as a revocable trust, it is most often established as an irrevocable entity with spendthrift provisions to afford asset protection and to prevent the beneficiary from possessing legal control over the funds. A properly structured third-party SNT generally carries no Medicaid payback provision, and upon the beneficiary’s death, any remaining assets pass to residual beneficiaries as designated by the trust creator, a feature that distinguishes it from a first-party SNT, which is subject to Medicaid estate recovery.

The tax treatment of a third-party SNT depends on its structure. A revocable third-party SNT is treated as a grantor trust, which generally does not require an Employer Identification Number (EIN), and income generated by the trust is simply taxed directly to the grantor on their individual Form 1040. In contrast, an irrevocable third-party SNT is a separate entity required to obtain an EIN and may qualify as a Qualified Disability Trust (QDisT) for federal tax purposes. This QDisT status affords the trust special income tax treatment, including a higher personal exemption than standard complex trusts. The income generated by the QDisT is reported by the trustee on IRS Form 1041, and any distributions of income made to the beneficiary are then reported on a Schedule K-1 and taxed on the beneficiary's individual IRS Form 1040 return.

=== Qualified Income Trust / Miller Trust / Utah Gap Trust ===
A "Qualified Income Trust" (QIT) or "Miller Trust" can be used to qualify an applicant for Medicaid when that applicant has high long term medical expenses that consume their actual income, but still have countable income limits in excess of the Medicaid eligibility limit (which may vary in different states). The difference between the actual and countable income amounts is referred to as the "gap" from which this type of trust takes one of its several names.

The QIT is most often used when nursing home (SNF) or adult living facility (HRF/ALF) costs, are sought from Medicaid. The Miller trust can be named as recipient of the individual's income from a pension plan, Social Security, or other source, effectively impoverishing them for this purpose. Income that is routed into a Miller Trust each month, as received, is no longer counted for Medicaid eligibility. The trust provides a specific manner in which funds in the trust will be spent each month. A Miller Trust does not provide any assistance with the "countable resources" requirement for Medicaid, and assets (other than monthly income) are not contributed to a Miller Trust.

Upon the death of the beneficiary, the state Medicaid agency must be paid back for its medical assistance from any remaining assets in the Miller trust. This is similar to the payback provision of an SNT, and QITs are sometimes considered a form of SNT.

The Miller trust takes its name from the Colorado case of Miller v. Ibarra, 746 F. Supp. 19 (D. Colo. 1990), and is specifically sanctioned by 42 U.S.C. § 1396p(d)(4)(B). It is likewise called a "Utah Gap Trust" because the shortfall between the two amounts reminded the attorney of the space between buttes in the Utah countryside. The Miller trust is significant only in those states (about half) which impose an income cap on Medicaid long-term care eligibility.

=== Pooled Income Special Needs Trust ===
A Nonprofit Pooled Income Special Needs Trust is authorized by 42 U.S.C. § 1396p(d)(4)(C). Again, the individual must be disabled under the Social Security definition. Unlike the other exempt trusts which can be administered by a private trustee who is an individual (such as a family member), the Pooled Income Trust is run by a nonprofit association, and a separate account is maintained for each individual beneficiary. All accounts are pooled for investment and management purposes. The trust (or more accurately, an account in the pooled trust) may be created by the beneficiary or a parent, grandparent, guardian, or court. In some states, a disabled individual over age 65 is entitled to transfer assets to a pooled trust and then be immediately eligible for Medicaid. In other states, the transfer must be made before the disabled individual attains the age of 66. Upon the death of the disabled individual, the balance is either retained in the trust for the nonprofit association or paid back to the State Medicaid agency for its medical assistance.

All 50 States have at least one state-approved Pooled Special Needs Trust.

== Distributions from a special needs trust ==
There are few restrictions on the distributions a trustee may make from an SNT as long as the distribution is for "supplemental and extra care over and above what the government provides" and is not for "support and maintenance" as defined by the eligibility rules of Supplemental Security Income as food and shelter. In practice, however, an SNT can fund social engagements and activities and can pay for adaptations to a home and the upkeep of those adaptations.

== Revocation of a special needs trust ==
Although most SNTs are "irrevocable", that irrevocability only applies to the instructions written into the instrument itself; once the trust is executed the text cannot be altered. Special needs trusts can otherwise be revoked according to their own terms as written into the document (if the trust corpus is exhausted, for example). The discretionary power of revocation belongs wholly and solely to the trustee. However, revocation may interfere with the receipt of governmental benefits, or may (with first-party SNTs) trigger a Medicaid repayment, so a trustee needs to use extreme caution in making this decision.

Some SNTs, such as certain grantor SNTs, may be revocable by a third-party settlor under limited circumstances. Note, however, that revoked trusts are not completed gifts for gift and estate tax purposes, and may subject the settlor to tax implications. Also, if the SNT is revoked for reasons other than good cause, the disabled beneficiary who relies on it may have legal recourse against the settlor for loss of governmental benefits and damages.
