= 457 plan =

Type of retirement plan in the United States

The 457 plan is a type of nonqualified, tax advantaged deferred-compensation retirement plan that is available for governmental and certain nongovernmental employers in the United States. The employer provides the plan and the employee defers compensation into it on a pretax or after-tax (Roth) basis. For the most part, the plan operates similarly to a 401(k) or 403(b) plan with which most people in the US are familiar. The key difference is that unlike with a 401(k) plan, it has no 10% penalty for withdrawal before the age of 55 (59 years, 6 months for IRA accounts) (although the withdrawal is subject to ordinary income taxation). These 457 plans (both governmental and nongovernmental) can also allow independent contractors to participate in the plan, where 401(k) and 403(b) plans cannot.

== Changes with EGTRRA 2001 ==
The Economic Growth and Tax Relief Reconciliation Act of 2001 (EGTRRA) made a number of changes in how governmental 457 plans are treated, the most notable of which is that the coordination of benefits limitation was removed. This allows a person whose employer has a 401(k) or 403(b) and a 457 to defer the maximum contribution amounts to both plans instead of coordinating the total and only being able to meet a single limit amount. Thus, participants can contribute the maximum $19,500 for 2021 into their 401(k) and also the maximum $19,500 into their 457 plan. If they are at least 50 at the end of the current tax year, they can contribute the additional catch-up amount into each plan, also, meaning an additional $6,500 into the 401(k) and another $6,500 into his governmental 457 (catch-up contributions are not provided for nongovernmental 457 plans). The total would then be $52,000 deferred instead of the $26,000 [19,500 + 6,500] that would have been allowed if the coordination of benefits provision had not been repealed in regard to the governmental 457 plan. As a result, many governmental employers have now set up 457 and 401(k) plans for their employees, and nonprofit employers have set up 403(b) and 457 plans, each allowing their employees to invest in both. Some state universities and school districts have access to all three tax-deferred plans. However, the total combined annual contribution to 401(k) and 403(b) plans is subject to the $19,500 limit and $6,500 catch-up limit.

Other notable changes made in the EGTRRA legislation were increasing the maximum deferral amount from the approximately $8,500 that was previously allowed to the same maximum elective deferral amount that 401(k) plans and now 403(b) plans allow, and easing restrictions on some plan rollovers. Governmental 457 plans may be rolled into other types of retirement plans with few restrictions beyond the normal ones for any other type of employer-provided plan, which includes separation of service or disability. This includes other gastro-401(k) and 403(b) plans and also IRAs. IRAs have much greater flexibility in withdrawal and conversion privileges. In contrast, nongovernmental 457 plans can only be rolled into another nongovernmental 457 plan.

== Changes with the Small Business Jobs Act ==
The Small Business Jobs Act of 2010 enabled 457(b) plans to include Roth accounts, which were previously only available only in 401(k) and 403(b) plans. This change took effect January 1, 2011. Contributions to Roth accounts are made on an after-tax basis, but distributions of both principal and earnings are generally tax-free.

=== Catch-up provisions ===
The 457 plan allows for two types of catch-up provisions. The first is similar to other defined contribution plans and amounts to an additional $6,500 that can be contributed as noted above. This option for making catch-up contributions is only available under governmental 457 plans. The second option is much more complicated and is available under both governmental and nongovernmental plans. It can be elected by an employee who is within 3 years of normal retirement age (and perhaps eligible retirement at any age). This second catch-up option is equal to the full employee deferral limit or another $19,500 for 2021. Thus, a person over 50 within 3 years of retirement and who has both a 457 and a 401(k) could defer a total of $66,500 [19,500 + 19,500 for 457 and 19,500 + 8,000 for 401(k)] into his retirement plans by using all of his catch-up provisions. The second type of catch-up provision is limited to unused deferral limits from previous years. An employee who had deferred the maximum amount of money into the 457 plan every year he was employed previously would not be able to use this extra catch-up.

== Governmental and nongovernmental plans ==
The two primary types of plans are governmental and nongovernmental. Some governmental plans were under 457(g), but those plans may no longer be created. Most governmental and nongovernmental plans are 457(b) plans.

=== Nongovernmental plans ===
Nongovernmental 457 plans have a number of restrictions that governmental ones do not. Money deferred into nongovernmental 457 plans may not be rolled into any other type of tax-deferred retirement plan. It may be rolled only into another nongovernmental 457 plan. Also, money deferred into nongovernmental plans is not set aside in a trust for the exclusive benefit of the employee making the deferral. The Internal Revenue Code requires that money in a nongovernmental 457 plan remains the property of the employer and not taxable until time of distribution for specific situations as allowed by the original 457 plan or in cases of withdrawals for emergency cash needed situations. If funds are set aside or provided in a separate account for the employee or in the employee's name then that type of 457 plan is not a tax-deferred plan and becomes a nongovernmental 457(b) funded pretax plan.

==== 457(b) (eligible) plans ====
Employee Retirement Income Security Act (ERISA) legislation has said that nongovernmental plans must be limited to some group of more highly compensated employees. The level of compensation required is not specified by ERISA, but it must be according to some ascertainable standard that the employer sets. The same highly compensated limit ($125,000 a year for the preceding year of 2019 and $130,000 for the preceding year of 2020 or 2021) in place for 401(k) discrimination testing would likely be acceptable, as would restricting the plan to some class of employees such as directors or officers. Because of this limitation to higher-compensation employees, 457(b) plans are occasionally referred to as "top hat" plans.

==== 457(f) (ineligible) plans ====
IRS code section 457(f) allows for nongovernmental, nonprofit organizations to set up a plan that can be tax deferred and exceed the normal defined contribution employee deferral limit. Ineligible 457 plans are made available because nonprofit organizations are not allowed to have another kind of nonqualified deferred-compensation plan.

Generally, these deferred amounts would be currently taxable under section 83 of the code, unless the employee faces a "substantial risk of forfeiture", which has been clarified by the IRS to mean that in addition to the money remaining available to general creditors of the organization, it must also be subject to a vesting schedule wherein it will be forfeited if the employee does not stay with the employer for the full vesting period. When the risk of forfeiture is gone, the value of the property given to the employee ceases to be deferred from taxation and is included in current ordinary gross income.

Another plan design, the rabbi trust, gives the employee deferred money in a trust and is funded, but must be available to creditors. This is to make the employer junior to general creditors, so that the employee can avoid current inclusion into income.

These general deferral of current income conditions of section 83 (as explained in revenue ruling 60-31) would give the 457(f) plan the deferral of tax desired.

In 2004, Congress passed a tax act that added Section 409A to the tax code and applies to deferred nonqualified compensation, which also covers some 457(f) plans. This was in response to the executive bonus plans given to key employees at Enron, which allowed them early access to their deferred compensation if financial conditions of the employer deteriorated (i.e., if Enron got into trouble).

== See also ==
Form 1099-R
